= List of library associations =

Library associations connect libraries, library workers, and information professionals at the local, national, and international level. Library associations often provide resources to their individual and institutional members that enable cooperation, exchange of information, education, research, and development.

== International ==
- Arab Federation for Libraries and Information (AFLI)
- Asociación de Estados Iberoamericanos para el Desarrollo de las Bibliotecas Nacionales de Iberoamérica
- International Francophone Association of Librarians and Documentalists
- Association of Independent Information Professionals
- China–CEEC Libraries Union (Chinese: 中国—中东欧国家图书馆联盟)
- Commonwealth Library Assocation (COMLA)
- Conference of Directors of National Libraries (CDNL)
- International Council on Archives
- International Federation of Library Associations and Institutions (IFLA)
- Polar Libraries Colloquy
- Seminar on the Acquisition of Latin American Library Materials (SALALM)
- Special Libraries Association (SLA)

=== Academic ===
- International Association of School Librarianship
- International Association of University Libraries

=== Political and social ===
- Information for Social Change
- Librarians for Fairness
- Progressive Librarians Guild

=== Religious ===
- Association of Christian Librarians
- Association of Jewish Libraries

=== Topic ===
- International Association of Agricultural Information Specialists (IAALD)
- International Association of Aquatic and Marine Science Libraries and Information Centers (IAMSLIC)
- International Association of Law Libraries
- International Association of Music Libraries
- International Association of Music Libraries, Archives and Documentation Centres
- Masonic Library and Museum Association

== Africa ==
=== Regional ===
- African Library and Information Associations and Institutions (AfLIA)
- Association of Parliamentary Libraries in Eastern and Southern Africa (APLESA)
- Association for Health Information and Libraries in Africa
- Eastern and Southern Africa Regional Branch of the International Council on Archives (ESARBICA)
- Standing Conference of Eastern, Central and Southern African Library and Information Associations (SCECSAL)
- West Africa Library Association (WALA)

=== Botswana ===
- Botswana Library Association (BLA)

=== Cameroon ===
- Cameroon Association of Librarians, Archivists, Documentation Professionals, Museographers (ABADCAM)
- Consortium of Cameroon University and Research Libraries (COCUREL)

=== Egypt ===
- Egyptian Library Association (ELA), est.1944

=== Eritrea ===
- Library and Information Association of Eritrea (LIAE)

=== Eswatini ===
- Eswatini Library and Information Association (ESWALA), formerly the Swaziland Library Association.

=== Ethiopia ===
- School for Information Studies in Africa (SISA), Ethiopia

=== The Gambia ===
- Gambia Library and Information Services Association

=== Ghana ===
- Ghana Library Association

=== Guinea ===
- Guinean Association for Sustainable Development Awake

=== Kenya ===
- Kenya Library Association

=== Lesotho ===
- Lesotho Library Association

=== Libya ===
- Libyan Association for Libraries Information and Archives

=== Malawi ===
- Malawi Library Association (MALA)

=== Mauritius ===
- Mauritius Council of Registered Librarians (MCRL)

=== Namibia ===
- Namibian Information Workers Association

=== Nigeria ===
- Nigerian Library Association (NLA)

=== Senegal ===
- Senegalese Association of Librarians, Archivist, and Documentation Professionals (ASBAD), Association Sénégalaise des Bibliothécaires, Archivistes et Documentalistes

=== Somalia ===
- Somali Library Association (SLA)

=== South Africa ===
- Association for Health Information and Libraries in Africa (AHILA)
- Development of Information Science in South Africa (DISSANET)
- Library and Information Association of South Africa (LIASA)
- Library and Information Studies Student Association a(LISSA)
- Organization of South African Law Libraries (OSALL)
- South African Health Librarians Forum (SAHLF)

=== Tanzania ===
- East African Community
- Tanzania Library and Information Association (TLA)

=== Tunisia ===
- Tunisian Library Association/Association Tunisienne des Bibliothécaires, Archivistes et Documentalistes (ATBAD)

=== Uganda ===
- Community Library Association of Uganda (COLAU)
- Uganda Library and Information Association (ULIA)

=== Zambia ===
- Library and Information Association of Zambia (LIAZ) (formerly Zambia Library Association (ZLA))

=== Zimbabwe ===
- Zimbabwe Library Association (ZimLA)

== East Asia, Southeast Asia, and South Asia ==
=== Regional ===
- Anatolian University Libraries Consortium (ANKOS), Turkey
- Association of Librarians in Public Sector (ALPS), Inc.
- Central Government Library Association
- Chhattisgarh Information and Library Association (CGILA)
- Chhattisgarh Library Association
- Congress of Southeast Asian Librarians (CONSAL)
- Middle East Librarians Association
- Regional Federation of South Asian Library Associations

=== Bangladesh ===
- Bangladesh Association of Librarians, Information Scientists and Documentation Professionals
- Library Association of Bangladesh

=== Cambodia ===
- Cambodian Librarians and Documentation Professionals Association

=== China ===
- China Society for Library Science, est. 1979 (Chinese: 中国图书馆学会)
- Chinese Library Association, est. 1925 (Chinese: 中华图书馆协会)
- Library Association of the Republic of China, Taiwan
- Macau Library and Information Management Association

=== Hong Kong ===
- Hong Kong Library Association

=== India ===
- Academic Library Association (ALA), India
- Andhra Pradesh Library Association
- Indian Academic Library Association
- Indian Association of Special Libraries and Information Centres (IASLIC)
- Indian Library Association (ILA)
- Kerala Library Association
- Kerala Library Professionals Organization
- Medical Library Association of India

=== Indonesia ===
- Indonesian Librarian Association - Ikatan Pustakawan Indonesia (IPI)

=== Japan ===
- Japan Art Documentation Society (JADS)
- Japan Association of Private University Libraries
- Japan Library Association
- Japan Medical Library Association
- Japan School Library Association
- Japan Special Libraries Association
- Junior College Library Association (Japan)

=== Malaysia ===
- Librarians Association of Malaysia (Malay: Persatuan Pustakawan Malaysia)

=== Maldives ===
- Maldives Library Association

=== Mongolia ===
- Mongolian Library Association (MLA)

=== Nepal ===
- Nepal Library Association (NLA)

=== North Korea ===
- Library Association of the Democratic People's Republic of Korea (North Korea)

=== Pakistan ===
- National Library Association (Pakistan)
- Pakistan Librarians Welfare Organization
- Pakistan Library Association
- Pakistan Library Automation Group (PakLAG)
- Pakistan Library Club
- University of Peshawar Library & Information Science Alumni Association - Pakistan

=== Philippines ===
- Association of Special Libraries of the Philippines
- Medical and Health Librarians Association of the Philippines
- Philippine Association of Academic and Research Librarians
- Philippine Association of School Librarians, Inc.
- Philippine Group of Law Librarians, Inc.
- Philippine Librarians Association, Inc.

=== Singapore ===
- Library Association of Singapore

=== South Korea ===
- Korean Association of School Libraries
- Korean Library Association
- Korean Medical Library Association
- Korean Public Library Association
- Korea University & College Library Association

=== Sri Lanka ===
- Sri Lanka Library Association

=== Taiwan ===
- Library Association of the Republic of China (Taiwan)
- Taiwan Medical Library Association

=== Thailand ===
- Thai Library Association, est.1954

=== Vietnam ===
- North Central Vietnam Library Association (Vietnamese: Liên hiệp Thư viện Bắc miền Trung)
- Southern University Library Association (Vietnamese: Liên Chi hội Thư viện Đại học phía Nam)
- Vietnam Library Association (VLA) (Vietnamese: Hội Thư viện Việt Nam)

=== Unsorted ===
- Librarians Association of Metro Pampanga (LAMP)
- Macau Library and Information Management Association
- Network of Academic Law Libraries, Inc. (NALL)
- Telangana Library Student Association (TLIBSA)
- Turkish Librarians Association - Turkey
- University and Research Librarians Association - Turkey

== Caribbean and Latin America ==
=== Regional ===
- Asociación de Estados Iberoamericanos para el Desarrollo de las Bibliotecas Nacionales de Iberoamérica (ABINIA)
- The Association of Caribbean University, Research and Institutional Libraries (ACURIL)
- Caribbean Association of Law Libraries (CARALL)
- Federación Española de Sociedades de Archivística, Biblioteconomía, Documentación y Museística (FESABID)

=== Antigua and Barbuda ===
- Barbuda Library Association
- Library Association of Antigua and Barbuda

=== Argentina ===
- Argentinian Library Association
- Argentinian Society for Information (SAI)
- Association of Graduate Librarians of the Argentine Republic (ABGRA)
- Librarian Association of Córdoba

=== Bahamas ===
- Bahamas Library Service Association (BLSA)

=== Barbados ===
- Library Association of Barbados

=== Belize ===
- Belize National Library Service and Information System

=== Bermuda ===
- Library Association of Bermuda (LAB)

=== Bolivia ===
- Association of Information Science Professionals of Bolivia, est.1995 (Spanish: Colegio de Profesionales en Ciencias de la Información de Bolivia) (CPCIB)

=== Brazil ===
- Brazilian Federation of Associations of Librarians, Information Scientists and Institutions (FEBAB)

=== Chile ===
- College of Librarians of Chile, Colegio de Bibliotecarios de Chile
- La Dirección de Bibliotecas, Archivos y Museos (DIBAM)

=== Colombia ===
- Colombian Library Association (ASCOLBI)
- Fundación Universitaria Compensar
- Fundación Universitaria del Área Andina

=== Costa Rica ===
- Colegio de Profesionales en Bibliotecología de Costa Rica (COPROBI)

=== Cuba ===
- Cuban Association of Librarians (ASCUBI)

=== Dominica ===
- Dominica Library & Information Society

=== El Salvador ===
- Asociación de Bibliotecarios de El Salvador (ABES)
- Librarian Association of El Salvador

=== Guatemala ===
- Asociación Bibliotecológica de Guatemala
- Comité de Cooperación entre Bibliotecas Universitarias de Guatemala
- FILGUA in Guatemala

=== Haiti ===
- Fondation Connaissance et Liberté (FOKAL)

=== Honduras ===
- Honduran Association of Librarians and Documentalists

=== Jamaica ===
- Association of Librarians in the Jamaica Library Service (ALJAS)
- Commonwealth Library Association (COMLA)
- Library and Information Association of Jamaica (LIAJA)

=== Panama ===
- Asociacíon Panameña de Bibliotecarios

=== Paraguay ===
- Asociación Paraguaya de Gestores de la Información (APGI)

=== St. Lucia ===
- National Association of Librarians and Information Professionals (NALIP) Saint Lucia

=== Trinidad and Tobago ===
- Library Association of Trinidad and Tobago (LATT)

=== Uruguay ===
- Asociación de Bibliotecólogos del Uruguay / Uruguayan Library Association (ABU)

=== Unsorted ===
- Asociación de Bibliotecarios Escolares de Puerto Rico
- Asociación Mexicana de Bibliotecarios (AMBAC)
- Brazilian Federation of Associations of Librarians, Information Scientists and Institutions (FEBAB)
- Cayman Islands Information Professionals (CIIP)
- Colegio Nacional de Bibliotecarios, A.C. (México)
- Sociedad de Bibliotecarios de Puerto Rico (SBPR)

== Central Asia ==
=== Regional ===
- ASEEES (Association for Slavic, East European, and Eurasian Studies)
- European Association for Health Information and Libraries (EAHIL)
- European Association of Aquatic Sciences Libraries and Information Centres (Euraslic)
- European Association of Libraries and Information Services on Addictions (Elisad), formerly the European Association of Libraries and Information Services on Alcohol and other Drugs
- European Association of Sinological Librarians (EASL)
- European Bureau of Library, Information and Documentation Associations (EBLIDA)
- Library Association of Eurasia

=== Kazakhstan ===
- Association of University Libraries of the Republic of Kazakhstan
- East Kazakhstan Librarians' Association
- Kazakhstan Library Association, est.2017
- Library Association of the Republic of Kazakhstan (BARK), est.1997

=== Kyrgyz Republic ===
- Kyrgyzstan Library Information Consortium (KLIC)

=== Tajikistan ===
- Library Society of Tajikistan

=== Uzbekistan ===
- Uzbekistan Library Association

== Europe ==
=== Regional ===
- ARLIS Norden
- Association of European Research Libraries (LIBER)
- Conference of European National Librarians (CENL)
- Consortium of European Research Libraries (CERL)
- European Theological Libraries (BETH)

=== Armenia ===
- Armenian Library Association
- Digital Library Association of Armenia
- International Association of Armenian Librarians and Archivists

=== Austria ===
- Austrian Association of Librarians
- Austrian Library Association

=== Belarus ===
- Belarusian Library Association

=== Belgium ===
- Belgian Association for Documentation
- Brussels Libraries
- Flemish Association for Libraries, Archives, and Documentation

=== Bosnia and Herzegovina ===
- Asocijacija informacijiskih stručnjaka-bibliotekara,arhivista i muzeologa (Association of information professionals - librarians, archivists and museologists), est.2006
- Library Association of the Republic of Srpska, est.1997
- Society of Librarians of the Federation of Bosnia and Herzegovina

=== Bulgaria ===
- Bulgarian Library Association

=== Croatia ===
- Croatian Association of Theological and Church Libraries
- Croatian Library Association

=== Czechia ===
- Association of Libraries of Czech Universities
- Association of Library and Information Professionals of the Czech Republic
- The Czech Republic Libraries Association (SDRUK ČR)

=== Denmark ===
- Danish Library Association
- Danish Union of Librarians
- German Library Center and Central Library Aabenraa
- Municipal Association for Educational Learning Centres
- Next Library

=== Estonia ===
- Estonian Librarians Association

=== Finland ===
- Bibliothecarii Medicinae Fenniae, Association of Medical Librarians
- Finland's Swedish Library Association
- Finnish Library Association
- Finnish Scientific Library Association
- Finnish Music Library Association
- Finnish Research Library Association
- Finnish Theological Library Association
- Finnish University Libraries’ Network (FUN)
- Society of Swedish Literature in Finland

=== France ===
- Association des directeurs de bibliothèques municipales et intercommunales des grandes villes de France (ADBGV), Association of directors of municipal and inter-municipal libraries of major cities in France, est.2002
- Association des directeurs et personnels de direction des bibliothèques universitaires et de la documentation (ADBU), French national association of directors and senior staff in university and research libraries, est.1974
- Association of French Librarians (Association des Bibliothécaires de France, ABF), est.1906
- Association of information and documentation professionals (ADBS), formerly the Association of specialized librarians and librarians
- Union Nationale Culture et Bibliothèque pour Tous (UNCBPT), est.1971

=== Georgia ===
- Georgian Association of Information Specialists, est.1997
- Georgian Library Association, est.2000

=== Germany ===
- Association of Archives and Libraries in the Protestant Church (AABevK)
- Association of German Librarians
- Bavarian Library Network (BVB)
- Library & Information Germany (BID)

=== Greece ===
- Association of Greek Librarians & Information Scientists

=== Hungary ===
- Hungarian Medical Libraries Association (MOKSZ)
- Association of Hungarian Librarians
- Union of Ecclesiastical Libraries

=== Iceland ===
- Icelandic Library and Information Science Association

=== Ireland ===
- Association of British Theological and Philosophical Libraries
- Library Association of Ireland

=== Italy ===
- Italian Library Association
- South Tyrol Library Association

=== Kosovo ===
- Association of Electronic Libraries in Kosova (AELK)
- Association of Librarians of Kosovo

=== Latvia ===
- Latvian Librarians Association

=== Lithuania ===
- Lithuanian Librarian's Association

=== Luxembourg ===
- Association of Luxembourg Librarians, Archivists and Documentalists
- Luxembourgish Public Library Association

=== Malta ===
- Malta Library and Information Association (MaLIA)
- Malta School Library Association (MSLA)

=== Moldova ===
- Association of Librarians from the Republic of Moldova, Asociaţia Bibliotecarilor din Republica Moldova

=== Netherlands ===
- Association for Theological Librarianship
- Dutch Association of University Libraries, the Royal Library and the Library of the Royal Dutch Academy of Science
- Dutch National Association of Public Libraries
- European Association for Health Information and Libraries
- European Bureau of Library, Information and Documentation Associations
- International Federation of Library Associations and Institutions
- Netherlands Public Library Association
- Royal Dutch Association of Information Professionals

=== North Macedonia ===
- INNOVA Lib
- Library Association of Macedonia

=== Norway ===
- Forum for Theological and Religious Sciences Libraries
- Norwegian Association of Special Libraries
- Norwegian Librarian Association

=== Poland ===
- Polish Librarians Association (Polish: Stowarzyszenie Bibliotekarzy Polskich)
- Polish Association of Libraries

=== Portugal ===
- Associação Portuguesa de Documentação e Informação de Saúde (APDIS; Portuguese Association for Health Documentation and Information)
- Portuguese Association of Librarians, Archivists and Documentation Professionals

=== Romania ===
- Romanian Library Association
- National Association of Public Librarians and Libraries in Romania

=== Russia ===
- Russian Library Association
- Library Assembly of Eurasia
- National Library Association "Libraries of the Future" (NALF)
- Association of School Librarians of the Russian World

=== Serbia ===
- Association of School Librarians of Serbia, est.2006
- Association of University Libraries in Serbia, est.1992
- Serbian Library Association, est.1947

=== Slovakia ===
- Slovak Librarians and Libraries Association (SSKK), est.1990
- Slovak Library Association (SAK)

=== Slovenia ===
- Association of Public Libraries
- Slovenian Library Association, est.1983

=== Spain ===
- Association of Librarians of the Church in Spain
- Spanish Society for Scientific Documentation and Information (SEDIC)
- Education and Libraries Association
- Galician Library Association (ABG)
- Spanish Federation of Societies of Archivist, Librarians, Documentalist and Museology (FESABID)
- Professional Association of Information Specialists (APEI)
- Asociación de Estados Iberoamericanos para el Desarrollo de las Bibliotecas Nacionales de Iberoamérica

==== Andalusia ====
- Association of Andalusian Librarians

==== Calonia ====
- Societat Catalana de Documentació i Informació (SOCADI)
- Col·legi Oficial de Bibliotecaris-Documentalistes de Catalunya (COBDC)

==== Valencia ====
- Association of Valencian Librarians (ABV)
- Colegio Oficial de Bibliotecarios y Documentalistas de la Comunidad Valenciana COBDCV)

==== Navarre ====
- Navarrese Association of Librarians (ASNABI)

=== Sweden ===
- Network for Theological Libraries in Sweden
- Swedish Library Association

=== Switzerland ===
- Bibliosuisse, est.2019
- Swiss Association Library & Information Management (SLI)

=== Turkey ===
- Turkish University and Research Librarians' Association (UNAK)
- Turkish Librarians' Association (TKDt)
- Anatolian University Library Consortium Association (ANKOS)

=== Ukraine ===
- Ukrainian Library Association (Ukrainian: Українська бібліотечна асоціація)

=== United Kingdom (UK) ===
- ASLIB (UK); formerly 'Association of Special Libraries and Information Bureaux (ASLIB)'
- Association of British Theological and Philosophical Libraries (ABTAPL), est.1956
- British and Irish Association of Law Librarians
- Cathedral Archives, Libraries & Collections Association (CALCA)
- Chartered Institute of Library and Information Professionals (CILIP), formerly the Library Association and the Institute of Information Scientists (UK)
  - CILIP Cymru Wales
- Independent Libraries Association, est.1989
- M25 Consortium of Academic Libraries
- Private Libraries Association (UK)
- Research Libraries UK
- School Library Association (UK)
- Society of College, National and University Libraries (SCONUL)

== Southwest and West Asia ==
=== Regional ===
- Middle East Librarians Association (MELA)
- IFLA Middle East and North Africa (MENA) Regional Division
- Arabian Gulf Chapter of the Special Libraries Association (SLA/GC)

=== Afghanistan ===
- Anjuman Ketab Khana-e-Afghanistan (Afghanistan Library Association)

=== Armenia ===
- Armenian Library Association (ALA), formerly known as Armenian Library Union
- International Association of Armenian Librarians and Archivists (IAALA)

=== Bahrain ===
- Bahrain Library and Information Association

=== Cyprus ===
- Cyprus Association of Librarians - Information Scientists (CALIS)

=== Iraq ===
- Iraqi Library Association
- Iraqi Association for Information, Libraries, and Documentation Specialists

=== Iran ===
- Iranian Library and Information Science Association
  - East Azerbaijan branch, est.2013
  - Mazandaran Branch, est.2007
- Iranian Medical Library Association
- The union of Iranian library and information science student associations (ADKA)

=== Israel ===
- Association of Israeli Librarians (ASI)
- Israeli Librarians and Information Professionals Association (ASMI)
- Association of Libraries, Archives and Data Processors in Israel
- Israeli Center for Libraries
- Israeli Librarians and Information Professionals Association, 2009-2021 (Hebrew: ארגון הספרנים והמידענים בישראל (ע"ר))
- Israeli Society of Libraries and Information Centers (SEMEL-ASMI), est.1966

=== Kuwait ===
- Library and Information Association of Kuwait

=== Lebanon ===
- Lebanese Library Association (LLA)

=== Oman ===
- Omani Library Association (OLA)
- Omani Association for Libraries and Information
- (LMA) The Library Monitor Association (Student-run Association)

=== Palestine ===
- Librarians and Archivists with Palestine

=== Qatar ===
- Library and Information Association in Qatar (LIA-Q)

=== Saudi Arabia ===
- Libraries Commission

=== Syria ===
- Libraries and Documents Association of Syria
- Syrian Library Association

=== Turkey ===
- Turkish Librarian's Association (TKD), Türk Kütüphaneciler Derneği
- Anatolian University Library Consortium Association (ANKOS)
- University and Research Librarians' Association (UNAK)

=== United Arab Emirates ===
- Emirates Library and Information Association (Arabic: جمعية الإمارات للمكتبات و المعلومات), est.2017

=== Yemen ===
- Yemeni Association for Disseminating Culture & Knowledge

== North America ==
=== Regional ===
- Academic Library Advancement and Development Network (ALADN)
- Art Libraries Society of North America
- Asociación Latinoamericana de Archivos (ALA)

=== Canada ===
- L'association des bibliothécaires du Québec/Quebec Library Association
- Atlantic Provinces Library Association (APLA
- British Columbia Library Association (BCLA)
- Canadian Association for Information Science (CAIS-ACSI)
- Canadian Association for School Libraries
- Canadian Association of Law Libraries / Association Canadienne des Bibliothèques de Droit (CALL / ACBD)
- The Canadian Association of Professional Academic Librarians / L’Association Canadienne des Bibliothécaires en Enseignement Supérieur (CAPAL / ACBAP)
- Canadian Association of Research Libraries / Association des Bibliothèques de Recherche du Canada (CARL / ABRC)
- Canadian Association of Special Libraries and Information Services
- Canadian Federation of Library Associations/Fédération canadienne des associations de bibliothèques (CFLA-FCAB)
- Canadian Health Libraries Association / Association des bibliothèques de la santé du Canada (CHLA / ABSC)
- Corporation des bibliothécaires professionnels du Québec (CBPQ)
- Library Association of Alberta (LAA)
- Newfoundland and Labrador Library Association (NLLA)
- Nova Scotia Library Association (NSLA)
- The Canadian Association of Music Libraries, Archives and Documentation Centres (CAML)
- Council of Atlantic University Libraries (CAUL)
- Council of Prairie and Pacific University Libraries (COPPUL)
- National Indigenous Knowledge & Language Alliance / Alliance nationale des connaissances et des langues autochtones (NIKLA)
- Northwest Territories Library Association (NWTLA)
- Nunavut Library Association (NLA)
- Yukon Library Association (YLA)

=== Mexico ===
- Asociación Mexicana de Bibliotecarios, A.C. (AMBAC)
- National College of Librarians (CNB), Colegio Nacional de Bibliotecarios
- Association of Librarians of Baja California
- Mexican Association of Private Archives and Libraries, A.C. (AMABPAC), Asociación Mexicana de Archivos y Bibliotecas Privados, A.C.

=== United States ===
Most United States state library associations publish a journal.

- American Library Association (ALA)
- American Association of Law Libraries (AALL)
- American Association of School Librarians (AASL)
- American Indian Library Association (AILA)
- American Theological Library Association (ATLA)
- Art Libraries Society of North America (ARLIS/NA)
- Asian/Pacific American Librarians Association
- Association des bibliothèques publiques du Québec (ABPQ)
- Association pour la promotion des services documentaires scolaires (APSDS)
- Association of Architecture School Librarians
- Association of Caribbean University, Research and Institutional Libraries
- Association of Christian Librarians (ACL)
- Association of College and Research Libraries (ACRL)
- Association of Library Professionals (ALP)
- Association of Research Libraries (ARL)
- Association of Southeastern Research Libraries (ASERL)
- Atlantic Provinces Library Association (APLA)
- Border Regional Library Association (BRLA)
- Boston Library Consortium (BLC)
- Cache Valley Library Association (CVLA)
- Catholic Library Association
- Chinese American Librarians Association
- Center for the Future of Libraries
- Church and Synagogue Library Association
- Evangelical Church Library Association
- Fédération des milieux documentaires (FMD)
- Florida Association for Media in Education
- Foothills Library Association
- Greater Edmonton Library Association
- Library Association of Alberta (LAA)
- Library Information Technology Association (LITA)
- Lubbock Area Library Association
- Major Orchestra Librarians' Association
- Manitoba Library Association (MLA)
- Medical Library Association
- Metropolitan New York Library Council (METRO)
- Mohave Library Alliance
- Mountain Plains Library Association
- Music Library Association
- New England Library Association
- North American Serials Interest Group (NASIG)
- Northwest Territories Library Association (NWTLA)
- Nova Scotia Library Association (NSLA)
- Nunavut Library Association
- Ontario Library Association (OLA)
- Pacific Northwest Library Association
- Patent and Trademark Resource Center Association (PTRCA)
- Polish American Librarians Association (PALA)
- Public Library Association
- Saskatchewan Library Association (SLA)
- Southeastern Library Association
- Southwestern Library Association
- Substance Abuse Librarians & Information Specialists (SALIS)
- Theatre Library Association
- United States Agricultural Information Network
- Urban Libraries Council
- USA Toy Library Association
- Western Association of Map Libraries
- Yukon Library Association

== Oceania ==
=== Regional ===
- Australian and New Zealand Theological Library Association (ANZTLA)
- Association of Parliamentary Librarians of Asia and the Pacific (APLAP)
- Pacific Islands Association of Libraries, Archives, and Museums (PIALA)
- Conference of Directors of National Libraries in Asia and Oceania (CDNLAO)
- IFLA Regional Standing Committee of Asia and Oceania (RSCAO)
- Pacific Regional Branch of the International Council on Archives (PARBICA)
- Council of Australasian University Librarians

=== Australia ===
- Australian Law Librarians' Association
- Australian Library and Information Association (ALIA)
- Australian School Library Association (ASLA)
- Western Australian School Library Association
- Australian School Library Association (NSW)
- School Library Association of South Australia (SLASA)
- School Library Association of Victoria
- Council of Australian University Librarians
- Public Libraries Australia
- Public Libraries NSW - Country (formerly Country Public Libraries Association NSW)
- Metropolitan Public Libraries Association (NSW)

=== Fiji ===
- Fiji Library Association (FLA)

=== Hawai'i ===
- Hawaii Library Association (HLA)

=== Marshall Islands ===
- Marshall Islands Library Association (MILA)

=== Micronesia ===
- Guam Library Association (GLA)
- Chuuk Association of Libraries (CAL)
- Kosrae Library Association (KLA)
- Libraries, Archives, and Museums of Pohnpei (LAMP)
- Yap State Libraries Association (YSLA)

=== New Zealand ===
- Council of New Zealand University Librarians (CONZUL)
- Library and Information Association of New Zealand Aotearoa, operating as LIANZA
- School Library Association of New Zealand Aotearoa (SLANZA)
- Te Rōpū Whakahau
- New Zealand Law Librarians Association
- Public Libraries New Zealand

=== Palau ===
- Palau Association of Libraries (PAL)

=== Samoa ===
- Library Association of Samoa

=== Tonga ===
- Tonga Library Association (ACT)

=== Vanuatu ===
- Vanuatu Library Association (VLA)

== See also ==
- History of public library advocacy
- Public library advocacy
- List of national and state libraries
- List of library consortia
- Lists of libraries by country
