= European Bureau of Library, Information and Documentation Associations =

European association of library associations

The European Bureau of Library, Information and Documentation Associations (EBLIDA) is an independent association of European library, information, and documentation associations and institutions. Created in 1992, EBLIDA was born out of a perceived long-standing need for European libraries to cooperate on common issues they faced, particularly those brought by a lack of integration of libraries into European policies and strategies. EBLIDA focuses primarily on European library legislation, the impact of the library on society, and Sustainable Development Goals (SDGs) in Europe. It is composed of a Council of members, an Executive Committee, a Secretariat, and optional bodies such as Standing Committees and Expert Groups. It is also represented by an elected President and appointed Director. As of March 2023, EBLIDA has 122 members from all European Union countries, representing approximately 70,000 individual libraries and 100 million library users across Europe.

== History ==
=== Foundation ===
EBLIDA was created in 1992 due to a perceived lack of consideration for libraries in European cultural initiatives. However, the need for a European association of libraries was first expressed during the International Federation of Library Associations and Institutions (IFLA) conference in Brighton, UK, in 1987. Three years later, in 1990, a meeting was organised in London by the Library Association (LA) (which later became the Chartered Institute of Library and Information Professionals (CILIP)), resulting in the creation of a working group tasked to prepare the creation of a new European organisation of library, information and documentation associations. One year later, in May 1991, the working group was able to reach an agreement on the mandate and basic structure of the new organisation. The new organisation was to be tasked with representing and defending the interests of libraries in the projects of the European Commission – particularly in regard to legislation –, fostering cooperation among members, and communication with the Commission and other political institutions. The constituent assembly of EBLIDA was held by its founding associations in The Hague, the Netherlands, on 12 June 1992.

=== 1992-2000 ===
EBLIDA was initially founded to address the issues of copyright, lending, and access to information. The association reached its first milestone in this regard shortly after its birth, with the Council Directive 92/100/EEC of 19 November 1992 on rental right and lending right and on certain rights related to copyright in the field of intellectual property.

By 1996, EBLIDA was working with the World Intellectual Property Organization (WIPO) on the improvement of treaties on copyright in the digital era. In 2000, the EBLIDA group of experts on copyright, together with the Council of Europe (COE), edited the Guidelines on Library Legislation and Policy in Europe – which was described in 2016 as “the best European paper on this topic in recent times.”

By the mid-1990s, the association had also taken on a communication role by promoting European programmes among its members and ensuring information reached them via a quarterly magazine and a discussion list.

As an association of libraries, EBLIDA is also an advocate for freedom of expression and information. This was made particularly clear when it publicly supported French libraries which faced censorship by the Front National in 1995-1996.

Additionally, the 1990s are considered the “Golden Age of European Programmes,” and libraries were not excluded: the schemes “Libraries” and “Telematics for Libraries” marked a period of cooperation and development of library services in Europe, and EBLIDA took part via successful project proposals funded by the schemes – for instance, the European Copyright User Platform (ECUP). “Telematics for Libraries” came to an end in 1998, a symptom of the end of library-focused funding programmes: since then, library projects have ceased to be the sole and direct receivers of European grants. Now, library projects are spread over various EU programmes.

With the golden age of European Programmes over and the rising challenges brought by technological advances looming closer, the new millennium represents a turning point for EBLIDA: it had to focus further on accessibility of information, and in particular, in the digital world.

=== 2001-2018 ===
By the turn of the millennium, EBLIDA’s concerns with the accessibility of information in a digital world are evident. The year 2001 marks another milestone, as, after years of lobbying, EBLIDA had a positive impact on the INFOSOC Directive (2001/29/EC) of 22nd of May 2001 on the Harmonisation of Certain Aspects of Copyright and Related Rights in the Information Society.

Similarly, although European funding no longer targeted libraries directly, EBLIDA was still an active participant in broader European projects targeting good practice in the digital world. For instance, from 2001 to 2003 EBLIDA was a member of PULMAN (Public Libraries Mobilising Advanced Networks), which aimed to stimulate the sharing of policies and good practices of cultural organisations, including libraries, in the digital era. Later, in 2014, the association was a partner in the establishment of ELINET (European Literacy Policy Network), a network which aimed to improve literacy policies – including digital literacy – in Europe, from 2014 to 2016. EBLIDA’s efforts on this matter were further strengthened in 2008, when it partnered with Ligue des Bibliothèques Européennes de Recherche (LIBER) to create a Joint Expert Group on Digitisation and Online Access.

During this period, the association also took a significant step in its work toward equality as an active participant in the conference which led to the Marrakesh Treaty, adopted in 2013, which focuses on providing access to published works for the visually impaired. Additionally, EBLIDA invested further in its work on communication and transmitting information, evident in initiatives such as the Right to e-Read Day, which took place in 2014, or Library Advocacy 4 EU! in 2015.

=== 2019-Present ===
2019 sees a change of direction in EBLIDA’s work. Despite remaining true to its role as an advocate for libraries, its action lines have adapted to the new realities: EBLIDA has shifted from looking at copyright from a legal perspective to an economic one and has broadened its action to invest further in the United Nations Agenda 2030 for Sustainable Development, e-lending, democracy, and equity. There has also been an increasing investment in the development of and cooperation on projects submitted to the European Union for funding. One successful example is the Resourcing Libraries in the European Union (RL:EU) project, which is ongoing under the coordination of Public Libraries 2030 (PL2030) and in partnership with PiNA.

EBLIDA’s investment in the implementation of the Sustainable Development Goals in libraries has resulted in the creation of three reports on SDGs and libraries, two tools – the SDG-KIC (Knowledge and Information Centre) and the EBLIDA Matrix, with a new tool, E-PANEMA, expected to be their successor – and training resources, such as the Guide for Library Applicants: European Structural and Investment Funds (ESIF) 2021-2027. Similarly, an example of EBLIDA’s work on e-lending is the Handbook on comparative e-lending policies in Europe which analyses the realities of e-lending in Europe in depth, questioning current stereotypes and myths on the matter.

Regarding library legislation and information law, EBLIDA has reached a milestone with the approval by the Committee of Ministers of the Council of Europe of the Recommendation CM/REC(2023)3 of the Committee of Ministers to Member States on Library Legislation and Policy in Europe, in April 2023. The Recommendation represents an update on and improvement of the Council of Europe/EBLIDA Guidelines on Library Legislation and Policy in Europe, which were approved in 2000: it takes into account the cultural, social, and technological developments that have shaped libraries in the twenty years since. The Recommendation includes new sections such as democratic participation, the 2030 Agenda on sustainable development, and digital transformation and artificial intelligence.

== Structure ==
EBLIDA consists of the Council, Executive Committee, Secretariat, and other optional bodies such as Standing Committees, Expert Groups, and other ad hoc Committees.

EBLIDA’s highest body is the Council, which consists of representatives of the full and associate members. The Council decides the organisation's policies and overall structure and is responsible for the election of the Executive Committee and President. The Executive Committee is EBLIDA’s second highest body and consists of a minimum of 4 and maximum of 10 elected full members, plus the President. It represents EBLIDA and exercises management and administrative rights.

The Secretariat carries out the decisions of the Council and the Executive Committee and handles the day-to-day activities. The head of the Secretariat and executive officer of EBLIDA is the Director, who is appointed by the Executive Committee.

== Publications ==
EBLIDA is the author of a series of publications on the topics of e-lending, library legislation and policy, and libraries and Sustainable Development Goals. These provide in-depth analyses of the topics and recommendations for the future for European libraries and include the Handbook on comparative e-lending policies in Europe (April 2023), the Second European Report on Sustainable Development Goals and Libraries: 2023 Update (March 2023), and A Guide for Library Applicants: European Structural and Investment Funds (ESIF) 2021-2027 (2021), among others.

EBLIDA also provides access to a series of position papers and statements on the issues that have affected libraries in Europe since the organisation's birth.

== See also ==
- List of library associations
