= Japan Medical Library Association =

Japanese library association

Coordinates: 35.6961784°N 139.7585694°E

The Japan Medical Library Association (JMLA) (Nihon Igaku Toshokan Kyōkai (日本医学図書館協会)) is a professional organization for medical libraries in Japan. The primary goal of the association is to provide training for medical librarians and to facilitate interlibrary loans.

== History ==
The JMLA was formed in 1927 by librarians from the Niigata University, Okayama University, Chiba University, Kanazawa University, and Nagasaki University as the Medical School Library Association. The organization's name changed to the current one in 1954. Eventually every major medical school and several dental and research institutions joined the association.

One of the JMLA's first goals was to have a system for interlibrary loans. The association published its first union catalog of medical journals in 1931. In the 1940s they received training and professional support from medical libraries in the United States. The JMLA has also offered continuing education courses since 1956.

However, Estelle Brodman conducted a study of Japanese medical school libraries in 1962 and found that departmental library collections were larger than the school's collections, and that librarians were not allowed to select books. Other librarians pointed out that medical school faculty did not trust librarians to select books for their libraries because they were not sufficiently trained as librarians, and called for the development of more college-level library schools. Medical libraries grew and improved throughout the 1960s and 1970s.

The JMLA established a "Health sciences information professional" certification in 2004.

== Structure and activities ==
The JMLA has 8 divisions based on geographical regions in Japan. They also have 12 committees that cover topics like publications, awards, and continuing education.

=== Publications ===
Subsequent publications of the Union Catalog of Medical Periodicals, which was established in 1931, were split into two volumes: one for domestic periodicals and another for foreign ones. Publication stopped in 2008. The JMLA publishes other books and periodicals, including its official journal, the Igaku Toshokan (医学図書館). The Igaku Toshokan began publication in 1954.

== See also ==
- Japan Library Association
- List of library associations
