= AMBAC =

AMBAC may refer to:

- Ambac Financial Group, a bankrupt American financial services company
- American Bosch Arma Corporation, an American branch of the Bosch Gmbh
- Asociación Mexicana de Bibliotecarios
