= GLA =

GLA or Gla may refer to:

== Entertainment ==
- GLA (album), by Scottish alternative rock band Twin Atlantic
- Great Lakes Avengers, a fictional comic hero group

== Organisations ==
- Gangmasters Licensing Authority, a British regulatory body
- General lighthouse authority, provides navigational aids in Britain and Ireland
- Georgia Library Association, United States
- Ghana Library Association
- GlassBridge Enterprises, where GLA was its former NYSE ticker symbol
- God Light Association, a Japanese new religion founded by Shinji Takahashi
- Great Lakes Airlines, an American airline
- Greater London Authority
- Guam Library Association

== Science and technology ==
- Alpha-galactosidase, a glycoside hydrolase enzyme
- GLA (gene), an encoding of the enzyme alpha-galactosidase A
- Gla domain, a protein domain
- Gamma-Linolenic acid, a fatty acid
- Linde–Buzo–Gray algorithm (also called Generalized Lloyd Algorithm), a vector quantization algorithm

== Other uses ==
- Gla, a Mycenaean fortification in Greece
- GLA (LGBT), meaning gay and lesbian alliance
- Gross leasable area, a measure of the total floorspace available to rent in commercial real estate
- GLA University, in Mathura Uttar Pradesh, India
- Glamorgan, historic county in Wales, Chapman code
- Glasgow Airport, IATA call-sign
- Global Leadership Adventures, an international high school study abroad program
- Mercedes-Benz GLA-Class, a car
- Scottish Gaelic, ISO 639-2 & ISO 639-3 language codes
