= List of addiction and substance abuse organizations =

Addiction services assist people affected by addiction.

== Canada ==
=== Addiction Services ===
Addiction Services, a division of the Nova Scotia Department of Health Promotion and Protection, aims to assist all individuals in achieving a safe and healthy lifestyle. Addiction Services offices are located across the province of Nova Scotia and offer help to those struggling with alcohol, drug, and gambling addictions. Addiction Services is operated by the District Health Authority of its corresponding community, and links to each of the individual offices are provided by means of an interactive map.

Documents and posters developed to raise awareness of the issues of alcoholism are also freely available on the website. News and Views: Responding to Addiction Issues is an e-newsletter provided by Addiction Services that highlights the accomplishments of substance use prevention, intervention, and treatment across the province and is freely available online.

=== Alcohol Policy Network ===
The Alcohol Policy Network's (APN) mission is to facilitate the discussion and development of policies that prevent problems associated with alcohol use and enhance the health, safety, and well-being of individuals and communities across the province of Ontario. The APN's online services are devoted exclusively to Canadian alcohol policy issues and are designed to encourage discussion, inform people about the various aspects of alcohol policy, and also profile the prevention efforts and successes of groups across the province of Ontario by means of various forums, such as the Alcohol: No Ordinary Commodity Forums.

The site also links to media initiatives such as keepcontrol.ca and provides a comprehensive listing of information for specific audiences, such as the homeless, aboriginal, youth, and senior populations, which is available both online and in downloadable format. The range of information available includes statistics, research, and policy papers and reports; links to journals, databases, and bibliographies; and other websites and web-based print resources, among others.

=== Canadian Addiction Rehab ===
An exclusive treatment center for addictions, drugs, and mental health.

=== Canada Drug and Alcohol Rehab Programs ===
This site provides a free online directory of alcohol and drug rehab programs and other addiction-related services, such as sexual addiction, problem with gambling, and eating disorder treatment, across the country to encourage those who are struggling with an addiction to seek out the assistance they need. Listings are provided by medical, outpatient, and residential programs and support groups, as well as by individual provinces. The site also provides a comprehensive listing of terms and definitions for each category listing.

=== Canadian Centre on Substance Use and Addiction ===
The mandate of the Canadian Centre on Substance Use and Addiction (CCSA) is to provide national leadership and evidence-informed analysis to secure the efforts required to reduce alcohol and other drug-related harms. CCSA provides access to a range of information relating to substance use and addiction, with a clear emphasis on prevention, and provides full access to their publications through the "Topics and Publications" sections of the website, including CCSA reports, statistics and fact sheets, newsletters and serials. Available in both French and English.

=== Centre for Addiction and Mental Health ===
The Centre for Addiction and Mental Health (CAMH) is Canada's largest addictions teaching hospital and a world-leading research center. CAMH is fully affiliated with the University of Toronto, in the province of Ontario, Canada, and is a Pan American Health Organization and World Health Organization Collaborating Centre. CAMH is strongly committed to assisting those suffering from addiction or mental illness with diverse rehabilitation services tailored to suit the needs of those individuals who are at risk or are at different stages of their addiction or illness.

The CAMH site also provides access to their publications, which includes free access to the CAMH Annual Reports and Strategic Planning Documents, and the Breakthrough newsletters for clients, patients, and their families. Additional CAMH publications may be ordered through the website. Available in both French and English.

=== Deal.org ===
The Deal.org program is affiliated with the Royal Canadian Mounted Police (RCMP) and prides itself as being an information and prevention tool specifically for Canadian youth to encourage healthy decision-making and to get involved in their communities. The site, while not substance use specific, does provide Canadian youths with the information they need about making informed decisions about drug and alcohol use. The site also provides access to their digital library, Knowzone, and an online magazine, Webzine, both of which contain content and resources developed by youths for youths. Available in French and English.

=== Health Canada ===
A comprehensive Drug Prevention guide is provided in the Healthy Living tab of the official Health Canada website. Health Canada actively recognizes that substance use is directly associated with the public safety of all Canadians. Resources include information about the Canadian Alcohol and Drug Use Monitoring Survey, and links to current and historical government publications, such as Straight Facts About Drugs and Drug Abuse, a good listing of drug and alcohol prevention publications, as well as other specialized resources and publications for target groups such as at-risk women and aboriginal peoples.

=== JACS ===
The Jewish Addiction Community Service (JACS) is a nonprofit agency located in Toronto with the aim of helping members of the Jewish community overcome addiction and co-dependency. JACS Toronto, working in concert with addiction treatment centres and mental health facilities across Canada and internationally, provides educational resources for addiction and recovery in the Greater Toronto Area.

=== Kids Help Phone ===
Kids Help Phone is Canada's only 24-hour, toll-free, anonymous telephone counseling and referral service and internet service specifically designated for children and youths. The service, although not specifically marketed for substance use, is an essential tool for Canadian children and youth at risk. The site provides an enormous variety of information about youth topics such as health, bullying, cyberbullying, violence and abuse, and a link library to other helpful resources, especially for youths. Available in French and English.

=== National Anti-Drug Strategy ===
The National Anti-Drug Strategy, in cooperation with the Government of Canada, provides three action plans aimed at the prevention of illegal drug use, treating those struggling with addictions, and combating the production and distribution of the illegal drug trade to ensure safe and healthy Canadian communities. Resources include a comprehensive listing of terms and definitions, resources for parents and youths with a significant emphasis on prevention, as well as a governmental listing of drug and alcohol addiction services, news links, and additional links to The Drug Situation Report (RCMP, 2007), and the 2007 World Drug Report (United Nations Office on Drugs and Crime).

=== Ontario Problem Gambling Research Center ===
The OPGRC aims to develop Ontario based research through the setting of research priorities and the funding of research projects. Yearly priorities are set by the Board of Directors after a review and analysis of research trends, needs, gaps and any other factors considered relevant. To assist in the process, the Centre requests the input of those involved in problem gambling research such as treatment providers, government, gaming providers and other stakeholders. Once completed, the Centre incorporates the priorities into the two scheduled solicitations for the fiscal year.

=== Pot and Driving Campaign ===
The goal of the Pot and Driving Campaign, in cooperation with the Canadian Public Health Association (CPHA), is to increase awareness among young Canadians of the risks of cannabis-impaired driving. Canadian youth have one of the highest rates of cannabis use in the world and many young Canadians who use pot see it as a benign, mainstream drug with no significant negative consequences. Resources, specifically targeted to prevention, are available from the website include a discussion guide for adults, a discussion handout for youths, frequently asked questions and a downloadable promotional poster. Available in French, English and Inuktitut.

=== Problem Gambling Services ===
Problem Gambling Services, a division of the Nova Scotia Department of Health Promotion and Protection, aims to assist individuals struggling with a gambling problem and also provide resources to those who are assisting others with a gambling problem. The website is divided into three sections: for people who want to make changes in their gambling, for friends and family members, and for professionals who may have regular contact with a problem gambler, such as healthcare professionals, clergy, and financial advisors. Resources include comprehensive definitions and free-to-order self-help materials provided by Addiction Services in Nova Scotia, as well as access to numerous research reports.

=== Drugs & Organized Crime Awareness Service ===
The Drugs and Organized Crime Awareness Service (DOCAS) is coordinated by the Royal Canadian Mounted Police (RCMP) and works in partnership with all levels of Canadian government and other non-governmental agencies to promote safe and healthy lifestyles in communities across Canada. In addition to its partnerships, DOCAS also provides services such as deal.org and access to other resources such as a drug identification chart and information about drug awareness, the Drugs: Know Your Facts, Cut Your Risks booklet, the Kids and Drugs: A Parent’s Guide to Prevention downloadable and printable booklet, and links to related sites such as the National Anti-Drug Strategy.

== United States ==
=== Alcoholics Anonymous ===
Alcoholics Anonymous (A.A.) is one of the world's most recognizable support groups for individuals suffering from alcohol addiction, where the only requirement for membership is to stop drinking in order to achieve sobriety. Notable publications available from the website include the This is A.A. pamphlet, which denotes what A.A. is and is not, the AA Big Book, available in English, French and Spanish. The website also includes links to further information for professionals, and how to locate local A.A. meetings.

=== Cenikor Foundation ===
The Cenikor Foundation is a private, not-for-profit behavioral health organization based in Houston, Texas. It offers long-term residential, short-term residential, detoxification and outpatient behavioral health services for adults and adolescents. Cenikor provides evidence-based therapeutic community addiction treatment through long-term residential programs in Baton Rouge, Louisiana, Deer Park, Texas, and Fort Worth, Texas, and detox/short-term residential treatment in Waco, Texas. Cenikor offers outpatient treatment services in Baton Rouge, Louisiana, Temple, Texas, Killeen, Texas, and Waco, Texas. Cenikor also has an adolescent residential facility in Houston, Texas, called Odyssey House Texas.

=== Greenway Recovery Center ===
The Greenway Recovery Center is a private behavioral health organization based in Lantana, Florida. It offers partial hospitalization, intensive outpatient and outpatient services for adults. Greenway utilizes a variety of treatment modalities such as cognitive behavioral therapy, Rational Emotive Behavior Therapy, Eye Movement Desensitization and Reprocessing among other effective methods. Greenway is known for their vow to help any addict find placement into a treatment center regardless of their financial status.

=== Hope Haven ===
Hope Haven is a private 501(c)(3) non-profit agency in Madison, Wisconsin. Hope Haven is managed and governed by Catholic Charities of Madison, WI and offers a wide range of support for adults who need both residential and out-patient services. Hope Haven has been providing evidence-based, affordable, effective alcohol and drug treatment services since 1973. Hope Haven serves and employ persons regardless of sexual orientation, religious, ethnic, racial or social background.

North Bay Lodge is Hope Haven's residential treatment facility, providing a minimum of 12 hours of therapy every week. From anger management and peer support, to session to aid those with a mental illness dual-diagnosis. Chris Farley House is Hope Haven's transitional housing facility, helping clients to ease into independent, sober living. To do that, they offer many of the same programs as North Bay Lodge, along with other programs to help residents find a job, stable housing, and help keep clients from relapsing after leaving the program.

Out-patient services include:

- Day Report and Treatment (DART), which helps people with substance use disorders by providing comprehensive alcohol and drug, mental health, and case management services. DART is a bail monitoring program and collaborates with the Mental Health Center of Dane County and Dane County Human Services.
- Pathfinder, for people in Dane County with recurring substance use issues and a history of going in and out of jail. Pathfinder a “wrap around” approach of comprehensive, long-term treatment to confront substance use, criminal behavior, and other barriers to change, with the goal of lifelong change.
- Marquette Chemical Dependency Service (MCDS), a private, state-certified program providing alcohol and substance use treatment and prevention services to the residents of Marquette County through a contract with the Marquette County Human Services Board.

=== Mothers Against Drunk Driving ===
The mission of Mothers Against Drunk Driving (MADD) is to stop drunk driving, to support the victims of drunk drivers, and to prevent underage drinking. Publications include links to the MADDVOCATE magazine, and numerous brochures on grief, injury, and legal advice.

=== National Institute on Drug Abuse ===
The National Institute on Drug Abuse (NIDA) is a national research leader and information provider on substance use and addiction in the United States. Notable resources available from the website include a comprehensive listing of substance use and related topics, and publications such as the NIDA Publication Series, including the NIDA Research Reports.

=== SMART Recovery ===
SMART Recovery is a 501(c)(3) non-profit organization, established in 1994, that provides free mutual-support meetings in the United States and in many other countries around the world. Its main publication, the SMART Recovery Handbook is available in English, Spanish, German, Portuguese, Farsi, Mandarin, and Danish. Their website includes how to locate local SMART Recovery meetings.

=== NY Problem Gambling - Free Resources For Gambling Addiction ===
New York Problem Gambling (NYCPG) is a non profit independent organization that strives to increase public awareness about problem gambling and related addictions. They work to educate people of all ages about the dangers that gambling addiction can pose and they try to help individuals get the help they need to overcome their addictions. Recently NYCPG created a new resource site that offers free eBooks as well as a toll free help line so people that are battling the disease can get help right away. This site is called Know the Odds. In addition they also created a resource for younger generations to learn about the dangers of gambling addiction before they get caught in the same trap that millions of adults have. In order to educate kids they created Don't Bet Yet so it could appeal to the youth that they want to educate.

=== RehabForTeens.co Teen Addiction Help ===
Free online resource with information on teen addiction and a SAMHSA search tool for finding treatment. This resource was established in 2014 and contains adolescent addiction stats and complete contact information for 3,000 licensed facilities.

=== TeenRehab.org - Free information about teen substance use ===
A free online resource for families and victims about teen substance use. They also have a 24/7 hotline that connects to an addiction specialist who can answer all questions and provide guidance on finding a teen rehab center.

=== American Drug Rehabs - Resource for Local Drug Rehabs ===
Online resource for anyone dealing with substance use issues. Specialists are available throughout the day to help people find a local addiction treatment program.

=== Drug Addiction Now - Drug and Alcohol Addiction News Resource ===
Resource which keeps users up to date on current and actively-discussed substance use, drug addiction and recovery related news.

=== FindRecovery ===
Online Resource for victims of substance use and their loved ones. Provides a directory of AA Meetings, NA Meetings, Al-Anon Meetings, MAT (Medication Assisted Treatment) doctors, and substance use disorder treatment facilities across the United States, as well as informative articles on additional addiction topics.

=== Find Addiction Rehabs ===
Find Addiction Rehabs focuses on helping individuals locate a treatment program that meets their addiction and mental health needs. They work with programs all over the country that offer a wide scope of treatment modalities. Find Addiction Rehabs provides individuals with the knowledge needed to make an educated decision on where to seek treatment.

=== Safe Landing Recovery ===
Rehab programs of Safe Landing Recovery take a comprehensive approach to teen addiction treatment and mental health, addressing the underlying causes of teen drug abuse and helping troubled teens realize their full potential.

== International ==
=== United Nations Office on Drugs and Crime ===
As a global leader in the fight against the international illegal drug trade, the United Nations Office on Drugs and Crime (UNODC) assists its Member States in their efforts to bring international illegal drug trade, crime, and terrorism. Although this website is not directly substance use specific, it does provide numerous resources that demonstrate the efforts and hard work of the United Nations and its Member State, and that they are making a difference in combating the international illegal drug trade, which is essential for ensuring safe and healthy persons and communities around the world. Important publications to note include the UNODC Annual Report, available for complete download in English, and the World Drug Report, also available for complete download in English from the website.

=== World Health Organization ===
The World Health Organization (WHO) is the directing and coordinating authority for health within the United Nations and offers a comprehensive listing under the Programs and projects tab on Management of Substance Abuse. This includes terminology and classification such as the WHO Lexicon of alcohol and drug terms, facts and figures, publications by topic such as prevention and treatment, and publications by source, such as articles or relevant resources from other WHO departments. The WHO website also provides links to other relevant sites, such as the Canadian Centre on Substance Abuse (CCSA) and the Centre for Addiction and Mental Health (CAMH).

== Intergovernmental ==
=== The Colombo Plan Drug Advisory Programme ===
The Colombo Plan is an intergovernmental organisation based in Colombo, Sri Lanka. The Drug Advisory Programme is a programme under the Colombo Plan.

== Europe ==
=== European Association of Libraries and Information Services on Addictions (ELISAD) ===
The European Association of Libraries and Information Services on Addictions, (ELISAD) is a European association of individuals and organizations with special interests in the exchange of information regarding alcohol, tobacco, drug and other addictions, whose sole purpose is to provide those working in addictions information with a network for exchanging knowledge, ideas and sharing experiences.

== See also ==
- Detoxification
- Problem gambling
- Intervention (counseling)
- Narcotic
- Opioid
- Drug rehabilitation
- Sexual addiction
- Substance use disorder or Addiction
- Support group
- Twelve-step program
