= Next Library =

Library science conference in Denmark

Next Library is an organisation that hosts a series of biennial Danish conferences for librarians and library professionals. International editions of the conference series began in 2014 and are referred to as "satellites."

== Background ==
The conference series was started by Aarhus Public Libraries in 2009, with conferences being held at Dokk1 in Aarhus. In 2014, a Next Library satellite conference took place at Chicago Public Library, that Rahm Emanuel attended. In September 2018, Next Library took place at the Amerika-Gedenkbibliothek in Berlin.

It describes itself as "an international gathering of forward-thinking library professionals, innovators and decision-makers who are pushing boundaries and making changes that support learning in the 21st century", and claims that more than 1400 librarians from 96 countries are in its network, with 350 librarians attending the 2015 and 2017 events in Aarhus.

Satellite conference host countries include the USA, South Korea, Germany, and others.

== Editions ==
Main editions
Date	Location	Themes	Ref.
2009	Aarhus		
2011	Aarhus		
2013	Aarhus		
2015	Aarhus		
2017	Aarhus	Literacy; The Learning Library; Emerging Trends; Community Engagement and Democracy; Strategic Partnerships; Design Thinking; Play	
2019	Aarhus	Libraries in Times of Social Crisis; Civic Media and Data Democracy; Temporary Spaces; Game Changing Tech & Emerging Trends	
2021	Virtual	Next Library Online Festival	
2023	Aarhus		
2025	Aarhus	The Sustainable Development Goals, Democracy, and Play	

Satellite and extra editions
Date	Location	Themes	Notes	Ref.
2008	Helsinki	Next Library Camp		
2010	Reykjavik	NORDIC CAMP 1		
2011	Stockholm	NORDIC CAMP 2		
2012	Oslo	NORDIC CAMP 3		
2014	Chicago, USA			
2018	Berlin			
2026	Myeong-Dong, Seoul	Reimagine the Library; Inclusive Libraries: Beyond Open Doors; Content, Experience, Exploration; Why Place Still Matters: Libraries as Places	First Next Library conference hosted in Asia	

== Advocacy and awards ==
- International Systematic - Joy of Reading Award winners
  - 2017: FunDza Literacy Trust
  - 2019: Za'atari Camp Libraries
- 2023: Celebrated the winners of the EIFL Public Library Innovation Award
  - Biblioteca de la Creatividad in Colombia;
  - Eastlands Library in Kenya,
  - Naujoji Vilnia Library in Lithuania,
  - Public Library ‘Radislav Nikčević’ in Serbia
- 2025: first Changemaker Award
  - Take Away Library Packs – Athens Comics Library, Greece
  - Craft, Play, Share - Centro Culturale Multiplo di Cavriago, Italy

== Notable attendees ==
- Glòria Pérez-Salmerón
- Daliana Suryawinata
- Menno Schilthuizen
- Yoeri Albrecht
- Christopher Breedlove, with Burners Without Borders
- Dr. Louise Bernard, Director of the Museum of the Obama Presidential Center
- Herman Wasserman
- Nina Simon
- Sandi Hilal
- R. David Lankes
- Princess Laurentien of the Netherlands
- Deborah Jacobs, Director of the Global Libraries program with the Gates Foundation
- Rahm Emanuel
- John G. Palfrey, Jr.
- Tina Sciabica, CEO of READ Global
- Gerfried Stocker
- Pat Losinski, former CEO of Columbus Metropolitan Library
- Helene Blowers, founder of 23 Things
- Gene Tan, Chief Innovation Officer at Singapore's Library Board
- Eppo van Nispen tot Sevenaer
- June Garcia, winner of the 2019 ALA Medal of Excellence

== See also ==
- Education for librarianship
- List of library associations
- List of libraries in Denmark
