= European Association of Libraries and Information Services on Addictions =

Library organization

The European Association of Libraries and Information Services on Addictions (ELISAD) – previously called, until end of 2011, European Association of Libraries and Information Services on Alcohol and other Drugs – was a European non-governmental and non-profit making social network of libraries, documentation centres and information services situated in Europe and specialised in alcohol, drugs, tobacco and all other behavioural addictions.

== Aims and tasks ==
ELISAD’s key purpose was to provide those working in the field of drug, alcohol, tobacco and other addictions information with a network for exchanging knowledge, ideas and sharing experiences.

ELISAD's tasks were:

- To stimulate and enhance European cooperation between libraries, information services, documentation centres and individuals working in the field of addictions.
- To stimulate the use and the development of information management technologies.
- To promote the role of libraries and documentation centres as important means for communicating research findings to different audiences.
- To enable professionals, practitioners, social workers and others working in the field of both licit and illicit drugs to gather information easily.

ELISAD organises an annual conference each year on topics relevant to information, research and documentation and addictions. It provides a mailing list for members to exchange information about new books, meetings and other resources.

== History ==
Following meetings in 1988 Lyon, France and 1989 Stockholm, Sweden of European librarians, documentalists and information professionals working in drugs, alcohol, and tobacco, it was recognised that there was a need to set up an association to enable the exchange of experiences, skills and knowledge. Annual meetings were felt to be a way of meeting this need, with the formal establishment of Elisad in 1990. Jasper Woodcock, Head of the Institute for the Study of Drug Dependence, UK – that became DrugScope in 2000 – was elected as Elisad’s first President.

Many existing library associations were models and encouraged the Elisad foundation:

- SALIS (Substance Abuse Librarians and Information Specialists), Elisad’s sister organisation in North America
- EAHIL (European Association for Health Information and Libraries)
- IFLA (International Federation of Library Associations and Institutions)
- ALA (American Library Association)
- ASIST (American Society for Information Science and Technology)

Over the years the annual conferences have covered many subjects.

In 1999, at the annual ELISAD meeting at the European Monitoring Centre for Drugs and Drug Addiction (EMCDDA) in Lisbon, presentations focused on the growth of information about addictions on the World Wide Web and raised concerns about the quality and accuracy of such resources. Presenters also found that their searches were producing thousands of results because addictions encompasses various research disciplines, including health, social sciences, medicine, law, politics, psychology, neurosciences, toxicology, and so on…

In 2000, at the annual meeting held in Prague, Czech Republic, ELISAD members issued their Ethical Charta to stress the fundamental importance of ethics in the field of drug information.

In 2002, at the annual meeting held in Bremen, Germany, given the national and international emphasis on provision and need for high quality and accurate information on drugs and other addictions, ELISAD members issued the Bremen Declaration. This declaration supported the need for high quality information whilst drawing attention to the deterioration of financial support for specialist addiction libraries across Europe. A response from ELISAD on this was to consider how they could contribute to the need for high quality resources and this resulted in funding from the European Commission to develop an internet portal on addiction resources from 32 countries in Europe.

Between 2003 and 2005 members of ELISAD developed the internet portal on addictions. This online European Gateway on Alcohol, Drugs and Addictions, provided descriptions of and links to evaluated European websites and other Internet resources on the use and misuse of drugs covering 32 countries.

From 2005 to 2007, a second development phase of the European Gateway was completed, again funded by the European Commission. The Gateway was updated and provides descriptions and links to more than 1100 evaluated websites on addictions, and is searchable in 17 languages. Visitors to the site can search for information on education and prevention, treatment, policy and research, find resources in their own countries or abroad and identify other European organisations of interest. The central challenge for this project was the language barrier within the different EU countries and considerable work was done on standardising the terminology among European countries and on the taxonomy used within this gateway.

More recent annual conferences have focused on how to address the problems many libraries and information services encounter due to the expansion of drug information on the Internet and the impact of finances being reduced. Their themes are :

- Addictions information in the Google era: dealing with challenges, Brussels, 2007
- Addictions information: Designing the future, Turin, 2008
- Addictions in society: what information services contribute, Budapest, 2009
- European ATOD libraries in challenging economic times, Utrecht, 2010
- Monitoring information on addictions - Sources and tools, Paris, 2011

In 2014 Elisad ceased existence and has joined with Substance Abuse Librarians and Information Specialists, an international association for those working in libraries and documentation centres on addictions and substance use disorders.
