= Association of UK Media Librarians =

The Association of UK Media Librarians (AUKML) was formed in 1986 to create a network of information professionals in the print and broadcasting industries as up until this point there had been no organised body to represent them. With the growth in online information and the perceived threat to jobs, informal links had begun to be made between individual librarians. However it was a networking lunch hosted by David Nicholas, Senior lecturer at the then Polytechnic of North London, that proved to be the catalyst in bringing most of the London-based librarians together in the summer of 1986. Nicholas had been in contact with a range of people working in the media as part of a British Library-funded study into online information. The lunch provided the impetus for the new group with Sarah Adair, librarian at London Weekend Television (LWT), assuming a leading role. The inaugural meeting took place on 12 November 1986.

At the same time, the National Association of Newspaper Librarians (NANL) had been formed independently to represent the views of regional librarians. Led by Peter Chapman, Chief librarian at The Northern Echo, the group soon had a membership of at least 30 that was meeting regularly. With similar aims the two groups formally merged on 7 March 1988. The AUKML name was retained and Deadline became the newsletter for the new group.

The number of media libraries and media librarians began to decline in the early 21st century and the Association ceased to exist in 2010

== See also ==
- List of libraries in the United Kingdom
