= Library Association of Bangladesh =

Research institute in Bangladesh

- বাংলাদেশ গ্রন্থাগার সমিতি
- Abbreviation: LAB
- Formation: July 28, 1956; 70 years ago
- Type: Nonprofit
- Legal status: Charity
- Purpose: National Organization for Library & Librarians
- Headquarters: 99/2, Shyamoli Housing (2nd Project), Adabor, Mohammadpur
- Location: Dhaka, Bangladesh
- Official language: Bengali
- President: Mr. M. S. Khan
- Secretary: Mr. Rakib Hossain
- Website: www.lab.org.bd

The Library Association of Bangladesh is a Bangladeshi national organization for libraries and librarian.

== History ==
The Library Association of Bangladesh traces its origins to the Pakistan Granthagar Samiti (Pakistan Library Association) which was formed in July 1956. The first convenor of the association was the professor of geography at Dhaka University, Dr Nafis Ahmed. On 30 June 1957, the constitution of the Pakistan Library Association was adapted. The first general meeting of the association was held at the United States Information Agency auditorium in Dhaka. The association created a certificate course for library sciences, the first in East Pakistan. The second to offer post-graduate degrees was the University of Dhaka.

The Library Association of Pakistan was renamed to Library Association of Bangladesh in 1971 after the Independence of Bangladesh. In 1976, it became member of the International Federation of Library Association and Commonwealth Library Association. In 1989 it started publishing a journal called Upatta.
