= Association of Architecture Librarians & Archivists =

Professional association

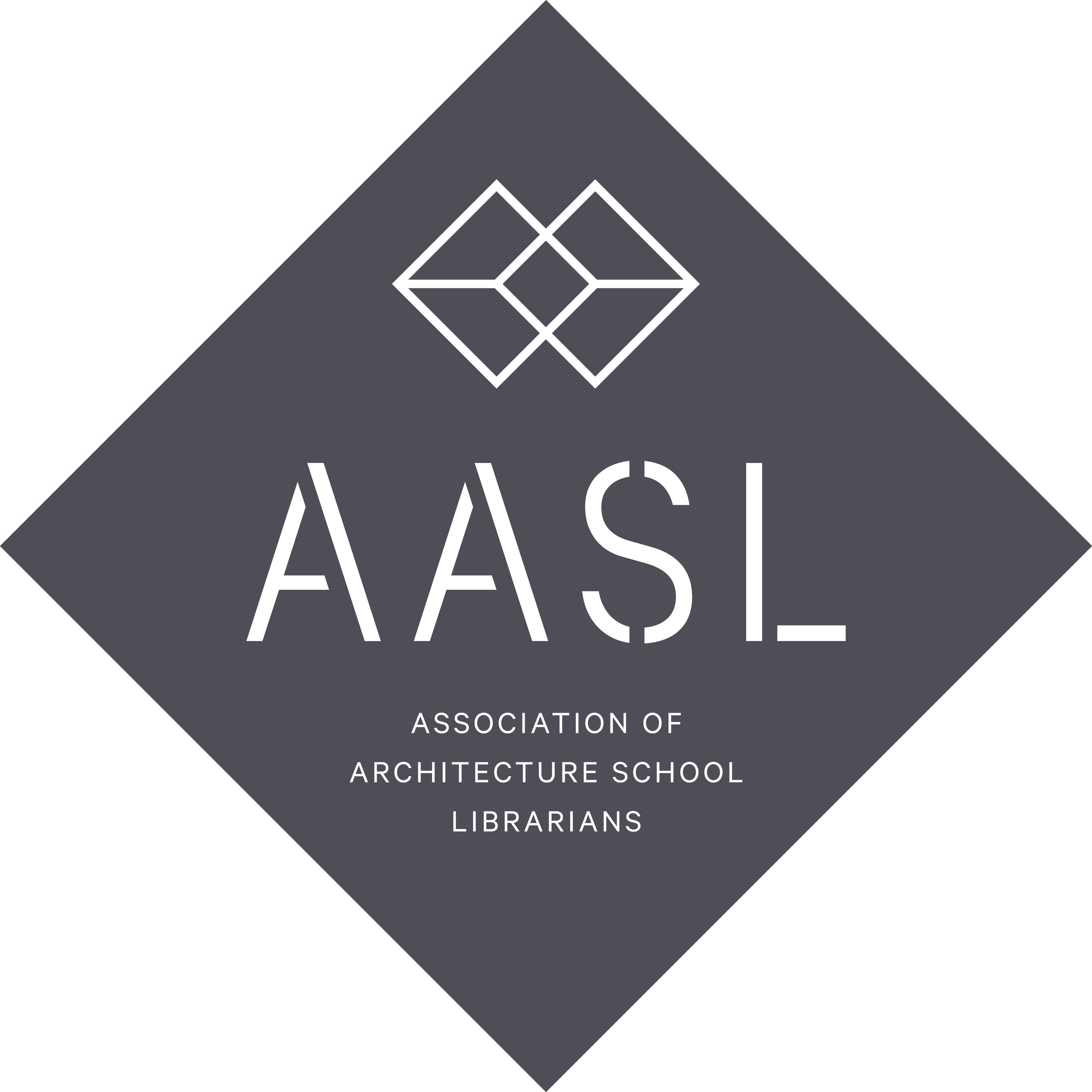
AASL logo

The Association of Architecture Librarians & Archivists (AALA) was founded in 1979. Its membership is open to any person or institution interested in the advancement of academic architectural librarianship and architecture education. Previously known as the Association of Architecture School Librarians, its name was changed in 2025.

== Mission ==
AALA was established to advance academic architectural librarianship, to develop and enhance the role of architecture school librarians in the advancement of architectural education, and to promote a spirit of cooperation among members of the profession.

== History ==
AALA was established in January 1979 at the annual meeting of the Association of Collegiate Schools of Architecture.

== Organizational structure ==
The officers of AALA consist of a president, vice-president/president-elect, secretary, treasurer, webmaster, column editors, and the immediate past president. Past officers are listed on the association's website.

== Annual conferences ==
AALA meets annually with the Association of Collegiate Schools of Architecture. Topics of conference sessions include collection development, user education, image retrieval, internet resources, special collections, electronic databases, the library's role in architecture school accreditation, and the acquisition of local architectural information.

The association introduced an open-access Conference Content Portal in 2016 that provides access to content produced for and/or sponsored by the AALA annual conference.

- 2019 - 41st annual, Pittsburgh, Pennsylvania
- 2018 - 40th annual, Denver, Colorado
- 2017 - 39th annual, Detroit, Michigan
- 2016 - 38th annual, Seattle, Washington
- 2015 - 37th annual, Toronto, Ontario
- 2014 - 36th annual, Miami, Florida
- 2013 - 35th annual, San Francisco, California
- 2012 - 34th annual, Boston, Massachusetts
- 2011 - 33rd annual, Montreal, Quebec
- 2010 - 32nd annual, New Orleans, Louisiana
- 2009 - 31st annual, Portland, Oregon
- 2008 - 30th annual, Houston, Texas
- 2007 - 29th annual, Philadelphia, Pennsylvania
- 2006 - 28th annual, Salt Lake City, Utah
- 2005 - 27th annual, Chicago, Illinois
- 2004 - 26th annual, Miami, Florida
- 2003 - 25th annual, Louisville, Kentucky
- 2002 - 24th annual, New Orleans, Louisiana
- 2001 - 23rd annual, Baltimore, Maryland
- 2000 - 22nd annual, Los Angeles, California
- 1999 - 21st annual,. Minneapolis, Minnesota
- 1998 - 20th annual, Cleveland, Ohio
- 1997 - 19th annual, Dallas, Texas
- 1996 - 18th annual, Boston, Massachusetts
- 1995 - 17th annual, Seattle, Washington
- 1994 - 16th annual, Montreal, Quebec
- 1993 - 15th annual, Charleston, South Carolina
- 1992 - 14th annual, Disney World, Florida
- 1991 - 13th annual, Washington, District of Columbia
- 1990 - 12th annual, San Francisco, California
- 1989 - 11th annual, Chicago, Illinois
- 1988 - 10th annual, Quebec City, Quebec
- 1987 - 9th annual, Los Angeles, California
- 1986 - 8th annual, Miami, Florida
- 1985 - 7th annual, Vancouver, British Columbia
- 1984 - 6th annual, Charleston, South Carolina
- 1983 - 5th annual, Santa Fe, New Mexico
- 1982 - 4th annual, Quebec City, Quebec
- 1981 - 3rd annual, Asilomar, California
- 1980 - 2nd annual, San Antonio, Texas
- 1979 - 1st annual, Savannah, Georgia

== Awards and honors ==
AASL offers two travel awards to its annual conference and two service awards.

The travel awards are the Francis Chen Travel Award and the Student Travel Award, both established in 2007.

The service awards are the Distinguished Service Award (established in 2012) and the Professional Service Award (established in 2015).

Past recipients are listed on the association's website.

== Affiliated organizations ==
- ARCHLIB
- Art Libraries Society of North America
- Association of Collegiate Schools of Architecture
- Society of Architectural Historians
- Visual Resources Association

== See also ==
- List of library associations
