= United States Agricultural Information Network =

US government network

The United States Agricultural Information Network (USAIN) provides a forum for issues in agricultural information, guides U.S. national information policy for agriculture, and advises the National Agricultural Library.

== History ==
The original network was based on a recommendation from the 1982 Interagency Panel of the National Agricultural Library (NAL). It was officially launched in 1988. It consisted of a network of public and private agricultural libraries and information centers coordinated by the NAL. Originally, the Executive Council was composed of representatives from land grant and other institutions, and the director of NAL, in an ex-officio capacity. By 1995, the Executive Committee moved from an organization-based network to an individual-based organization, transferring the responsibility for the operations to individuals. At the 1995 USAIN Conference held in Lexington, Kentucky, a slate of grassroots-working agricultural information professionals emerged as the new Executive Council.

== Activities ==
=== Conferences ===
USAIN holds biennial conferences on current themes in agricultural information. This includes collection management and preservation, data management and scholarly communication, curriculum and instruction, outreach and marketing, and national information policy.

- 1990 – University of Illinois at Urbana-Champaign; Inaugural meeting
- 1991 – University of Minnesota, Minneapolis, Minnesota; Electronic Information in the Agricultural Sciences
- 1993 – Auburn University, Auburn Alabama; Rural Information at the Crossroads: Issues and Opportunities
- 1995 – University of Kentucky, Lexington, Kentucky; Cultivating New Ground in Electronic Information: Use of the Information Highway to Support Agriculture.
- 1997 – University of Arizona, Tucson, Arizona, joint conference with the International Association of Agricultural Information Specialists (IAALD); The Information Frontier: Linking People and Resources in a Changing World
- 1999 – Kansas State University, Manhattan, Kansas, From Production to Consumption: Agricultural Information for All
- 2001 – North Carolina State University, Raleigh, North Carolina; Extending Our Reach: Redefining and Promoting Agricultural Information Through Partnerships
- 2003 – University of Illinois at Urbana-Champaign, Champaign, Illinois; Agricultural Information for the New Millennium: New Crops, Biotechnology, and Saving the Past
- 2005 – University of Kentucky, Lexington, Kentucky, joint conference with the International Association of Agricultural Information Specialists (IAALD) World Congress; The Globalization of Information: Agriculture at the Crossroads
- 2006 – Cornell University, Ithaca, New York; Delivering Information for the New Sciences
- 2008 – Ohio State University, Wooster, Ohio; Tradition in Transition: Information Fueling the Future of Agbiosciences
- 2010 – Purdue University, West Lafayette, Indiana; Agriculture Without Borders: Creating Knowledge and Partnerships Across Disciplines and Across the World
- 2012 – University of Minnesota, Minneapolis, Minnesota; Soil, Water, Food and Energy: Agriculture in an Era of Global Climate Change
- 2014 – University of Vermont, Burlington, Vermont; Sustainable Agriculture: Stewardship of our Information Ecosystem
- 2016 – University of Florida, Gainesville, Florida; Interdisciplinary Agriculture: Meeting Tomorrow's Global Challenges
- 2018 – Washington State University, Pullman, Washington; Consuming Information: Agriculture at the Crossroads of Sustainability
- 2020 – Texas Tech University, Lubbock, Texas; Smart Agriculture in the Era of Climate Change (Virtual due to COVID-19)
- 2022 – University of Arkansas, Fayetteville, AR; Supporting Agriculture: Food, Fiber, and Family (Virtual due to COVID-19).
- 2024 – Michigan State University, East Lansing, Michigan; Growing Together, Branching Out. Also joint conference held with Council on Botanical and Horticultural Libraries (CBHL)
- 2026 – Virginia Tech, Blacksburg, VA; Extending Our Reach 2.0: Honoring our past, celebrating the present, & planning the future.

=== National Preservation Program ===
USAIN's preservation plan for agricultural literature, one of the first discipline-based plans, obtained several rounds of funding from the National Endowment for the Humanities and resulted in 29 state projects,

USAIN recently partnered with Agriculture Network Information Center (AgNIC) and the Center for Research Libraries on Project Ceres, which awards funding for “small projects that preserve print materials essential to the study of the history and economics of agriculture and make those materials accessible through digitization.”

== Presidents ==
- 1988: Nancy Eaton, 1st President, Iowa State University
- 1989–90: John Beecher, North Dakota State University
- 1990–92: Julia Peterson, Cargill
- 1992–93: Richard Rohrer, University of Minnesota
- 1993–94: Martha Alexander, University of Missouri
- 1994–95: Cynthia Via
- 1995–98: Antoinette Powell, University of Kentucky
- 1998–99: Rita Fisher, Washington State University
- 1999–00: Barbara Hutchinson, University of Arizona
- 2000–01: Diana Farmer, Kansas State University
- 2001–02: Amy Paster, Pennsylvania State University
- 2002–03: Dana W. R. Boden, University of Nebraska–Lincoln
- 2003–04: Jodee Kawasaki, Montana State University
- 2004–05: Pat Wilson, University of Kentucky
- 2005–06: Lutishoor Salisbury, University of Arkansas
- 2006–07: Heather K. Moberly, Oklahoma State University
- 2007–08: Norma Kobzina, University of California, Berkeley
- 2008–09: Kathleen (Katie) Newman, University of Illinois at Urbana–Champaign
- 2009–10: Sheila Merrigan, University of Arizona
- 2010–11: Allison Level, Colorado State University
- 2011–12: Mary Ochs, Cornell University
- 2012–13: Eileen Herring, University of Hawaii at Manoa
- 2013–14: Connie Britton, Ohio State University
- 2014–15: Valrie I. Minson, University of Florida
- 2015–16: Philip Herold, University of Minnesota
- 2016–17: Sarah C. Williams, University of Illinois at Urbana–Champaign
- 2017–18: Leslie Delserone, University of Nebraska–Lincoln
- 2018–19: Kristen Mastel, University of Minnesota
- 2019–20: Claudine Jenda, Auburn University
- 2020–21: Jessica Page, Ohio State University
- 2021–22: Megan Kocher, University of Minnesota
- 2022–23: Suzanne Stapleton, University of Florida
- 2023–24: Kiri DeBose, Virginia Tech
- 2024–25: Melody Royster, University of Florida
- 2025–26: Randa Lopez Morgan, Louisiana State University
- 2026–27: Livia Olsen, Kansas State University
