= Asociación de Estados Iberoamericanos para el Desarrollo de las Bibliotecas Nacionales de Iberoamérica =

Library-related professional association

Asociación de Estados Iberoamericanos para el Desarrollo de las Bibliotecas Nacionales de Iberoamérica (ABINIA; transl. Association of Ibero-American States for the Development of the National Libraries of Ibero-America) is an association of Ibero-American national libraries. It began in Mexico on 14 December 1989 as the Asociación de Bibliotecas Nacionales de Iberoamérica (Association of Ibero-American National Libraries). In 1999 the group adopted its current name. As of 2019 it operates from headquarters in Caracas, Venezuela. Official languages of the group are Spanish and Portuguese.

== Members ==
Members of ABINIA
Country	Name	Year established
Argentina	Biblioteca Nacional de Argentina	1810
Bolivia	Biblioteca Nacional de Bolivia	1825
Brazil	Biblioteca Nacional do Brasil	1810
Chile	Biblioteca Nacional de Chile	1818
Colombia	Biblioteca Nacional de Colombia	1777
Costa Rica	Biblioteca Nacional Miguel Obregón Lizano de Costa Rica	1888
Cuba	Biblioteca Nacional José Martí de Cuba	1901
Dominican Republic	Biblioteca Nacional de República Dominicana	1971
Ecuador	Biblioteca Nacional del Ecuador Eugenio Espejo	1792
El Salvador	Biblioteca Nacional de El Salvador	1870
Guatemala	Biblioteca Nacional de Guatemala	1879
Honduras	Biblioteca Nacional de Honduras	1880
Mexico	Biblioteca Nacional de México	1833
Nicaragua	Biblioteca Nacional Rubén Darío de Nicaragua	1880
Panama	Biblioteca Nacional Ernesto J. Castillero R. de Panamá	1942
Paraguay	Biblioteca Nacional de Paraguay	1887
Peru	Biblioteca Nacional del Perú	1821
Portugal	Biblioteca Nacional de Portugal	1796
Puerto Rico	Biblioteca Nacional de Puerto Rico	1967
Spain	Biblioteca Nacional de España	1711
Uruguay	Biblioteca Nacional de Uruguay	1815
Venezuela	Biblioteca Nacional de Venezuela	1833

== See also ==
- List of library associations
- Library and information science
