= Association of Librarians of the Church in Spain =

Professional association for librarians

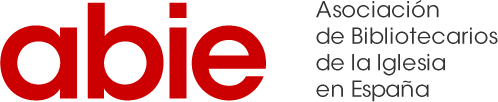
- Abbreviation: ABIE
- Founded: 1993
- Type: librarians professional association
- Headquarters: Añastro, 1. E-28033 (Madrid, Spain)
- Region served: Spain
- Members: 60
- President: Francisco José Cortés Martínez, librarian at Loyola University Andalusia
- Website: Abie.es

The Association of Church Librarians in Spain (Asociación de Bibliotecarios de la Iglesia en España - ABIE, in its official name in Spanish language) is a Spanish public association of a non-profit nature, founded in 1993 by the Episcopal Conference of Spain, for the defense, conservation, and diffusion of the bibliographic heritage of the Church in Spain. It is one of the 20 associations and professional associations members of the Spanish Federation of Archival, Library, Documentation, and Museum Societies (Federación Española de Sociedades de Archivística, Biblioteconomía, Documentación y Museística - FESABID, in Spanish language). The Association is also a member of BETH - European Libraries of Theology (Bibliothèques Européennes de Théologie in French language). ABIE currently has about 60 members.

According to Chapter II, Article 6.1 of its Charters of Association, the Association is made up of all those persons who prove that they have a stable position of librarian or library assistant in any of more of 300 ecclesiastical libraries or documentation centers in Spain (capitular, diocesan, parish, episcopal, etc.).

Its main activities are the realization of thematic training courses for its members, and hosting the annual Technical Conference, since 2007, which has been held mainly in Madrid, although in recent years they have also taken place in different regions of Spain. From 2007 to 2017, the conference was held in Madrid, mainly at the San Damaso Ecclesiastical University (between 2013 and 2017). In 2018, the decentralization of the conference began, and between 2018 and 2020 they have been held in Córdoba, Oviedo, and Salamanca, respectively. These conferences have become the main and most important meeting and meeting point for all the professionals and technicians who manage these libraries, for the exchange of opinions and experiences and for updating knowledge. The Conference is organized jointly with the Episcopal Commission for the Cultural Heritage of the Episcopal Conference of Spain.

In 2010, together with the Ignacio Larramendi Foundation, it convened a "Good Library Practices Award", which was won by the Library of the Colegio de San Gabriel in Madrid.
