= Brazilian Federation of Associations of Librarians, Information Scientists and Institutions =

Library organization in São Paulo, Brazil

- Federação Brasileira de Associações de Bibliotecários, Cientistas da Informação e Instituições
- Abbreviation: FEBAB
- Formation: July 26, 1959; 67 years ago
- Type: Non-profit organization
- Purpose: "To defend and encourage the development of the profession."
- Headquarters: São Paulo, Brazil
- Region served: Brazil
- President: Jorge Moisés Kroll do Prado
- Staff: 1
- Volunteers: 10
- Website: www.febab.org.br

The Brazilian Federation of Associations of Librarians, Information Scientists and Institutions (Portuguese: Federação Brasileira de Associações de Bibliotecários, Cientistas da Informação e Instituições, but simply known by its acronym FEBAB) is a non-profit organization in Brazil. Its mission is to "defend and encourage the development of the profession." FEBAB is the oldest library association in the country, founded in 1959; it is also the largest. Its headquarters is in São Paulo. The organization is a federation of 16 library associations, some active and some inactive, one for each state of Brazil. Each state library association has its own organization and governing body, but generally meet in conjunction with other FEBAB meetings. FEBAB members participate in international activities as part of the International Federation of Library Associations and Institutions (IFLA).

== History ==
FEBAB emerged from a proposal by Laura Russo (1915–2001) and Rodolfo Rocha Júnior during the 2nd Congress of Libraries and Documentation (CBBD) in Salvador, Bahia in 1959. The organization as incorporated on July 26, 1959, with the main objective of defending and encouraging the development of librarianship as a profession. Laura Russo served as the first president of the organization, serving from 1961 to 1975.

Russo, along with Maria Alice Toledo Leite and Maria Helena Brandão procured a headquarters for the organization in São Paulo in 1969. The librarian Neusa Dias de Macedo noted in 1989 that the first thirty years of the organization was marked by "financial and administrative infrastructure difficulties".

The Brazilian Federal Council of Librarianship (Portuguese: Conselho Federal de Biblioteconomia, CFB) was created in 1965. In contrast to FEBAB, which is responsible for training and promoting librarianship as a profession, the CFB acts as a representative body for librarians in the Brazilian state and federal government.

== Governing structure ==
FEBAB consists of a general assembly, a board of directors, an executive board, a fiscal council, associated commissions, and working groups. Members of the executive board serve for three terms, and include a president, vice-president, directors of administration, communication and publications, events, political and professional training. It additionally includes the regional directors from the sixteens states of Brazil and a member of the fiscal council.

=== Commissions and Working Groups ===
FEBAB has 11 commissions and working groups, each with their own area of responsibility and governance. They roughly correspond to the commissions and working groups of other national library associations, and include the:

- Brazilian Commission of University Libraries (Portuguese: Comissão Brasileira de Bibliotecas Universitárias)
- Brazilian Commission of School Libraries (Portuguese: Comissão Brasileira de Bibliotecas Escolares)
- Brazilian Commission of Prison Libraries (Portuguese: Comissão Brasileira de Bibliotecas Prisionais)
- Brazilian Commission on Copyright and Open Access (Portuguese: Comissão Brasileira de Direitos Autorais e Acesso Aberto)
- Working Group on Public Libraries (Portuguese: Grupo de Trabalho em Bibliotecas Públicas)
- Working Group on Library Accessibility (Portuguese: Grupo de Trabalho em Acessibilidade em Bibliotecas)
- Working Group on Cataloging (Portuguese: Grupo de Trabalho em Catalogação)
- Working Group on Diversity and Gender (Portuguese: Grupo de Trabalho Bibliotecas pela Diversidade e Enfoque de Gênero)
- Working Group on Parliamentary Libraries (Portuguese: Grupo de Trabalho de Bibliotecas Parlamentares)
- Working Group on Ethnic-Racial Relations and Decolonization (Portuguese: Grupo de Trabalho Relações Étnico-Raciais e Decolonidades)
- Working Group on Library Services for Vulnerable People (Portuguese: Grupo de Trabalho Serviços de Bibliotecas para Pessoas Vulneráveis)

== Events ==
FEBAB holds annual or biannual conferences, which include the Brazilian Congress on Library and Documentation (CBBD); the International Congress on Archives, Libraries, Documentation Centers and Museums; SENABRAILLE, the National Seminar on Braille Libraries; and the National Seminar of University Libraries.

== Publications ==
The primary publication of FEBAB is an academic journal, the Revista Brasileira de Biblioteconomia e Documentação (English: Brazilian Journal of Librarianship and Documentation). It dates to 1973 and replaced an newsletter, Boletim Informativo, published since 1960. The organization also hosts numerous publications, notably of translations of international library standards and other documents issued by the International Federation of Library Associations.

== See also ==
- List of libraries in Brazil
- International Federation of Library Associations (IFLA)
- List of library associations
