= Belgian Association for Documentation =

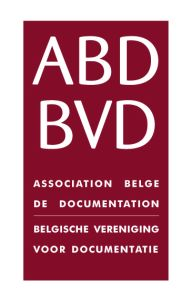
- Abbreviation: ABD-BVD
- Formation: 1947
- Type: Professional body
- Headquarters: Royal Library of Belgium
- Location: Brussels
- President: Guy Delsaut
- Secretary-General: Michèle Orban
- Affiliations: EBLIDA
- Website: https://www.abd-bvd.be

The Belgian Association for Documentation (abbreviated ABD-BVD.) is a professional body for librarians, information specialists and knowledge managers in Belgium.

Created in 1947, the ABD-BVD's aims and activities converge to help those professionals in this permanent step towards the reinforcement of both their competence and the quality of their work.

It focuses its activities on:

- promoting information science related professions
- new techniques and methods in information management
- creating competence networks and allowing experience exchange
- training its members
- defending its members' interests at a European level

The Belgian Association for Documentation organizes an annual conference, the so-called "Inforum", to present important and actual topics in the field of information and documentation. Since 1947, it also publishes the quarterly review Cahiers de la Documentation/Bladen voor Documentatie, with articles in French, Dutch and English. The association includes today more than 500 professionals from the private and public sectors
