= New England Library Association =

American professional association

- Nickname: NELA
- Formation: June 1, 1938; 88 years ago
- Founded at: Manchester, Vermont
- Parent organization: American Library Association

The New England Library Association (NELA) is a professional organization for New England's librarians and library workers. It was founded in Manchester Vermont in June 1938 at the first Regional Conference of New England State Library Associations. Each of the six New England states sends delegates to the annual NELA conferences. The organization's stated purpose upon its founding was "the exchange of ideas and the welfare of libraries through addresses, discussions and similar measures." In 1963, it was formerly incorporated and chartered in Massachusetts. Its current objectives as of January 2020 are "to initiate, plan and support regional activities; to encourage the exchange of ideas; and to cooperate with regional and national agencies having related interests."

== State library associations within New England ==
- Connecticut Library Association
- Maine Library Association
- Massachusetts Library Association
- New Hampshire Library Association
- Rhode Island Library Association
- Vermont Library Association

== See also ==
- List of libraries in the United States
