= Libraries Commission (Saudi Arabia) =

Saudi library development body

- هيئة المكتبات
- Type: Governmental organization
- Purpose: Development of libraries and fostering reading
- Headquarters: Riyadh, Saudi Arabia
- Region served: Saudi Arabia
- Website: https://libraries.moc.gov.sa

The Libraries Commission (Arabic: هيئة المكتبات) is a Saudi governmental organization established in February 2020. It is headquartered in Riyadh, the capital of Saudi Arabia. The Libraries Commission aims to develop libraries in Saudi Arabia and foster an environment that encourages reading.

== Initiatives ==
=== Public Libraries Development ===
On June 18, 2020, the Libraries Commission announced an initiative to transform public libraries into cultural platforms that foster knowledge, engagement, and interaction among individuals from various societal segments. The initiative, managed by the Libraries Commission, aims to establish 153 public libraries across Saudi regions in two phases:13 libraries to be completed by 2022, with the remainder finalized by 2030.

=== Library Sector Development Initiative ===
On May 27, 2021, the Commission launched its strategy to develop the library sector in Saudi Arabia, guided by a new vision aimed at elevating and transforming libraries from mere information repositories into comprehensive cultural platforms. These platforms host engaging activities and events for community members while continuing to promote reading habits, enrich knowledge, and enhance information awareness.

The strategy encompassed multiple initiatives serving the library sector, partners, and the broader community, reflecting the pivotal role libraries play in achieving the objectives of the Ministry of Culture, aligned with Saudi Vision 2030. Libraries are envisioned as collaborative, developmental cultural platforms within an engaging environment, focused on fostering skills, ensuring lifelong learning, promoting business development, innovation, and invention, enhancing workforce capabilities, and facilitating international knowledge exchange and cooperation.

=== Audio content of books ===
Launched the "Masmou" (English: audible) project during the Riyadh International Book Fair 2022. The project focuses on audio book content, offering an interactive experience for visitors through cabins that allow listening and browsing. On May 24, 2023, the Authority announced the launch of the second phase of the "Masmou" audio library cabins project in public gathering places. This phase began in Al-Ahsa, followed by the cities of Dammam, Khobar, Riyadh, and Jeddah, as part of an initiative to provide library services in community hubs.

=== Digital Books Platform ===
On June 20, 2023, the Libraries Commission announced the launch of the "Digital Books Platform," which enables users to access a large collection of audiobooks, e-books, and other digital content through a single electronic platform. The platform also allows users to borrow books for free.

=== Mini library ===
In July 2023, the Commission launched the "Manawel" (English: handing over) initiative, aimed at promoting reading, culture, and knowledge among various segments of society. The initiative features a self-service device that functions as a mini-library, enabling the automated borrowing and return of books.

=== Poetry ===
In August 2023, the Libraries Commission launched the "With Poetry, I Color My Life" initiative in Taif Governorate, which includes four tracks:

1. Poetry Wall
2. Educational Workshops
3. Composition and Group Singing Theater
4. Poetry Readings

=== Manuscripts ===
In July 2021, the Commission launched the "Manuscript Accessibility" service on its official website. The service is designed to facilitate user access to manuscripts, saving time and effort by providing comprehensive details about each manuscript. Available information includes a digital image of the manuscript, its title, description, subject, the full name of the author, the author's date of death, the manuscript's opening and closing sections, the name of the copyist, the script type, the number and dimensions of its pages, the language of the copy, the location where it is preserved, its preservation number, and general notes regarding the manuscript.
