= Nepal Library Association =

Library Association in Nepal

NLA
- Nepal Library Association
- नेपाल पुस्तकालय संघ
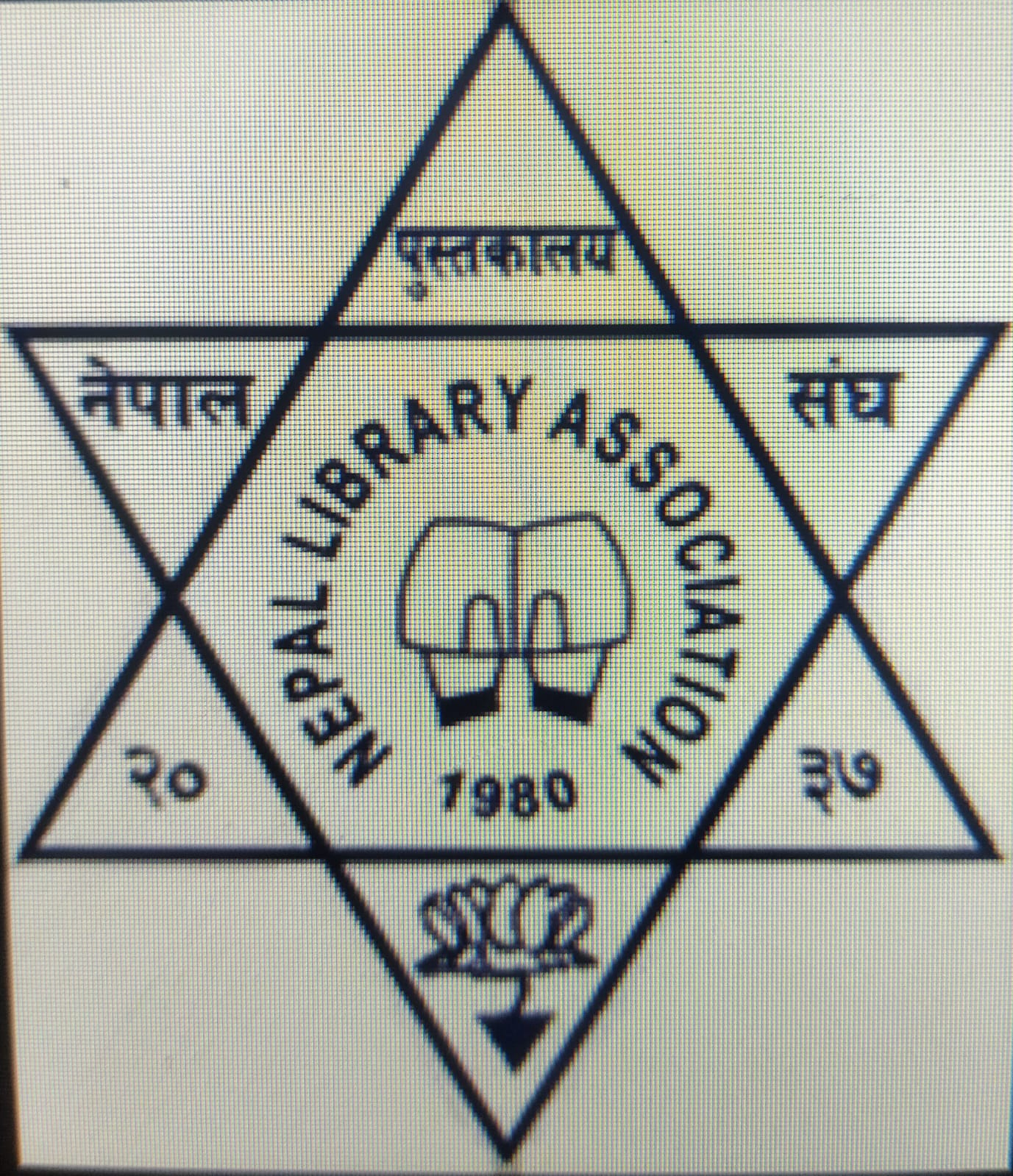
- Formation: 25 September 1980
- Founder: Murari Binod Pokharel
- Headquarters: Kathmandu, Bagmati, Nepal
- Services: Improving library and information services (LIS) and promoting library professionalism in Nepal
- Members: 1500
- President: Subedi, Pushparaj
- Affiliations: International Federation of Library Associations and Institutions (IFLA)
- Staff: 13
- Website: https://nla.org.np

The Nepal Library Association (NLA) is a professional organization established to support the development of libraries and library professionals in Nepal. It was first established in 1954 and operated for seven years. It was re-established on Asoj 9, 2037 (September 25, 1980).

As of 2008, it was under the leadership of Bhola Kumar Shrestha.

== Publications ==
- Access: An International Journal of Nepal Library Association
- Intellect Horizon: An Annual Magazine

== See also ==
- List of libraries in Nepal
