= READ Global =

US-based nonprofit organization

Coordinates: 37°48′1.69″N 122°27′9.94″W

- Established: 1991; 35 years ago
- Headquarters: Torney Ave. at Lincoln Blvd. San Francisco, California
- Region: Rural South Asia
- Website: www.readglobal.org
- Remarks: READ commits local businesses to support the centers.

READ (Rural Education and Development) Global is a non-profit organization operating in rural South Asia and headquartered in San Francisco, California. Founded on the belief that improved access to educational resources creates lasting social change in developing communities, READ partners with rural villages to build Community Library and Resource Centers (READ Centers). READ Centers offer a variety of programs – from literacy and women's empowerment to information communications technology (ICT) and livelihood skills training. READ currently works with communities in rural Bhutan, India and Nepal. As of August 2013 there were over 69 READ Centers in India, Bhutan, and Nepal, and over two million individuals had access to these centers.

== History ==
Antonia "Toni" Neubauer founded READ in 1991 as the non-profit arm of her adventure travel company, Myths & Mountains, after being inspired by the simple wish of her Nepalese trekking companion: to have a library in his village. READ began partnering with rural communities in Nepal to build Community Library and Resource Centers, and then paired each center with a for-profit enterprise to sustain the center in the long run.

In 2006, READ Nepal won the Bill & Melinda Gates Foundation Access to Learning Award for its innovative approach to building and sustaining community libraries. READ Global was launched in 2007 with the goal of expanding the model to new countries, and after being awarded a replication grant from the Gates Foundation in 2008, READ began operations in India and Bhutan.

As of August 2013, READ Global had established 67 READ Centers and 98 for profit enterprises, which they state have a reach of 1.95 million villagers in 171 different villages in Bhutan, India, and Nepal.

== Approach ==
The READ model brings together education, enterprise and community development by building READ Centers that offer educational resources and a space for programming.

=== READ Centers ===
Each center has a variety of sections:

- Library with 3,000-5,000 language-appropriate books, and a selection of current newspapers and magazines
- Computer center with Internet capabilities (where available)
- Early Childhood Development section that includes age-appropriate learning toys and materials
- Women’s Empowerment Center that offers women and girls a safe space to access literature and educational materials relevant to their needs
- Communications Center with telephone, fax and copying services
- AV room including DVD, CD, projector, television, video and slide projection resources
- Training and Meeting Hall where staff and local partner organizations can conduct programs related to community development.

=== Sustaining enterprises ===
Once a READ Center has been built, READ works with the community to seed a for-profit enterprise to generate income to sustain the center over the long run. Sustaining enterprises range from simple storefront rentals to sewing and apparel centers, ambulance services, and community radio stations.

=== Programs ===
READ Centers offer a variety of programming led by READ staff and local partner organizations:

- Educational programming: literacy, basic computer skills trainings, programs to promote a culture of reading for children, etc.
- Women's Empowerment programming: trainings on health, women's legal rights, vocational skills and confidence-building, etc.
- Economic empowerment programming: savings & credit cooperatives, women’s cooperatives, livelihood skills trainings (beekeeping, agriculture, mushroom farming, etc.)
- Information and Communications Technology (ICT) programming: basic computer and Internet classes, trainings on the use of mobile and radio for development.

== Awards and recognition ==
- Lipman Family Prize Award, University of Pennsylvania and the Wharton School of Business = $100K : 2013
- Bill & Melinda Gates Foundation grantee= $4.7M : 2011
- Clinton Global Initiative, honored for Women’s Empowerment Initiative Commitment: 2011
- Bill & Melinda Gates Foundation Access to Learning Award: 2006
