= Information professional =

Someone who handles information

The term information professional or information specialist refers to professionals responsible for the collection, documentation, organization, storage, preservation, retrieval, and dissemination of printed and digital information. The service delivered to the client is known as an information service.

The term "information professional" is a versatile one, used to describe similar and sometimes overlapping professions, such as librarians, archivists, information managers, information systems specialists, information scientists, records managers, and information consultants. However, terminology differs among sources and organisations. Information professionals are employed in a variety of private, public, and academic institutions, as well as independently.

== Skills ==
Since the term information professional is broad, the skills required for this profession are also varied. A Gartner report in 2011 pointed out that "Professional roles focused on information management will be different to that of established IT roles. An 'information professional' will not be one type of role or skill set, but will in fact have a number of specializations". Thus, an information professional can possess a variety of different skills, depending on the sector in which the person is employed.

Some essential cross-sector skills are:

- IT skills, such as word-processing and spreadsheets, digitisation skills, and conducting Internet searches, together with skills loan systems, databases, content management systems, and specially designed programmes and packages.
- Customer service. An information professional should have the ability to address the information needs of customers.
- Language proficiency. This is essential in order to manage the information at hand and deal with customer needs.
- Soft skills. These include skills such as negotiating, conflict resolution, and time management.
- Management training. An information professional should be familiar with notions such as strategic planning and project management.

Moreover, an information professional should be skilled in planning and using relevant systems, in capturing and securing information, and in accessing it to deliver service whenever the information is required.

== Associations ==
Most countries have a professional association who oversee the professional and academic standards of librarians and other information professionals. There are also international associations related to LIS (library and information science), the most prominent of which is the International Federation of Library Associations and Institutions (IFLA). In many countries, LIS courses are accredited by the relevant professional association, as the American Library Association (ALA) in the USA, the Chartered Institute of Library and Information Professionals (CILIP) in the UK, and the Australian Library and Information Association (ALIA) in Australia.

== Qualifications ==
Educational institutions around the world offer academic degrees, or degrees on related subjects such as Archival Studies, Information Systems, Information Management, and Records Management. Some of the institutions offering information science education refer to themselves as an iSchool, such as the CiSAP (Consortium of iSchools Asia Pacific, founded 2006) in Asia and the iSchool Caucus in the USA. There are also online e-learning resources, some of which offer certification for information professionals.

=== Africa ===
Information development in Africa started later than in other continents, mainly due to a lack of internet access, expertise and resources to manage digital infrastructure, and "opportunities for capacity development and knowledge-sharing".

Nowadays, academic degrees in information studies are available at many universities of African countries, such as the University of Pretoria (South Africa), University of Nairobi (Kenya), Makerere University (Uganda), University of Botswana (Botswana), and University of Nigeria (Nigeria).

=== Asia ===
LIS-related studies are available in more than 30 Asian countries. Some examples listed by iSchools Inc. are the University of Hong Kong, University of Tsukuba, Japan, Yonsei University, South Korea, National Taiwan University and Wuhan University, China. Centre of Library and Information Management Science (CLIMS) at Tata Institute of Social Science in Mumbai, India. In Southeast Asia, the Congress of Southeast Asian Librarians (CONSAL) connects librarians and libraries in more than 10 countries with resources, networking opportunities, and support for growing library systems.

=== Australasia ===
The Australian Library and Information Association (ALIA) as of 2021 lists six schools offering undergraduate and postgraduate accredited university courses for "Librarian and Information Specialists" on their website.

In New Zealand, the Open Polytechnic of New Zealand and the Victoria University of Wellington offer undergraduate and postgraduate degree courses for information professionals.

=== Europe ===
The majority of European countries have universities, colleges, or schools which offer bachelor's degrees in LIS studies. Over 40 universities offer master's degrees in LIS-related fields, and many institutions, such as the Swedish School of Library and Information Science at the University of Borås (Sweden), the University of Barcelona (Spain), Loughborough University (UK), and Aberystwyth University (Wales, UK) also offer PhD degrees.

=== North America ===
Information studies and degrees are available at numerous academic institutions throughout the U.S. and Canada. U.S. professional associations, together with their European counterparts, have undertaken many educational initiatives and pioneered many advances in the field of Information studies, such as increased interdisciplinarity and more effective delivery of distance learning. The Association for Intelligent Information Management, based in Silver Spring, Maryland, offers a qualification called Certified Information Professional (CIP), earned upon passing an examination, with certification remaining valid for three years.

=== South America ===
There are many schools and colleges in Latin America, which offer courses in Library Science, Archival Studies, and Information Studies, however these subjects are taught completely separately.

== See also ==
- Archival science
- Association of UK Media Librarians
- Education for librarianship
- Information retrieval
- Information school
- Information scientist
- International Society for Knowledge Organization (ISKO)
- Library and information science
- List of library associations
- UKSG
