= International Association of Agricultural Information Specialists =

International professional association

The International Association of Agricultural Information Specialists is the international professional association of people and institutions who are professionally involved in creating, capturing, accessing, or disseminating information and knowledge concerning agriculture and rural development. See list of similar professional associations.

IAALD acts as a community of practice, linking and connecting information professionals worldwide. It convenes conferences and meetings, publishes a peer-reviewed journal, sponsors professional training and education, facilities e-discussions, and publishes a web site, blog, etc. It works through a network of country and regional chapters; cooperating with independent 'sister' regional and specialist associations.

IAALD collaborates with organizations like the Consultative Group on International Agricultural Research (CGIAR), the Technical Centre for Agricultural and Rural Cooperation ACP-EU (CTA), the Food and Agriculture Organization of the United Nations (FAO), the United States National Agricultural Library (NAL) and other leading agricultural research and knowledge institutes.

Over the years IAALD has held twelve world congresses and thirty-three regional conferences on six of the seven continents.

IAALD publications include A Primer for Agricultural Libraries (2 editions), Current Agricultural Serials, World Directory of Agricultural Libraries and Documentation Centres, Agricultural Resource Centers: A World Directory (3 editions), as well as newsletters and training aids.

IAALD was established in 1955 as the International Association of Agricultural Librarians and Documentalists - hence the acronym.

== Sources ==
Ballantyne, P.G. 2006. "Focus on - The International Association of Agricultural Information Specialists." Information Development 22(1): 22-23.

Greider, A.P. 2006. "The International Association of Agricultural Information Specialists (IAALD)." Focus 37(2): 54-56

http://www.iaald.org

IAALD journal articles listed on Google Scholar
