= Japan Library Association =

Japanese professional organization

- 日本図書館協会
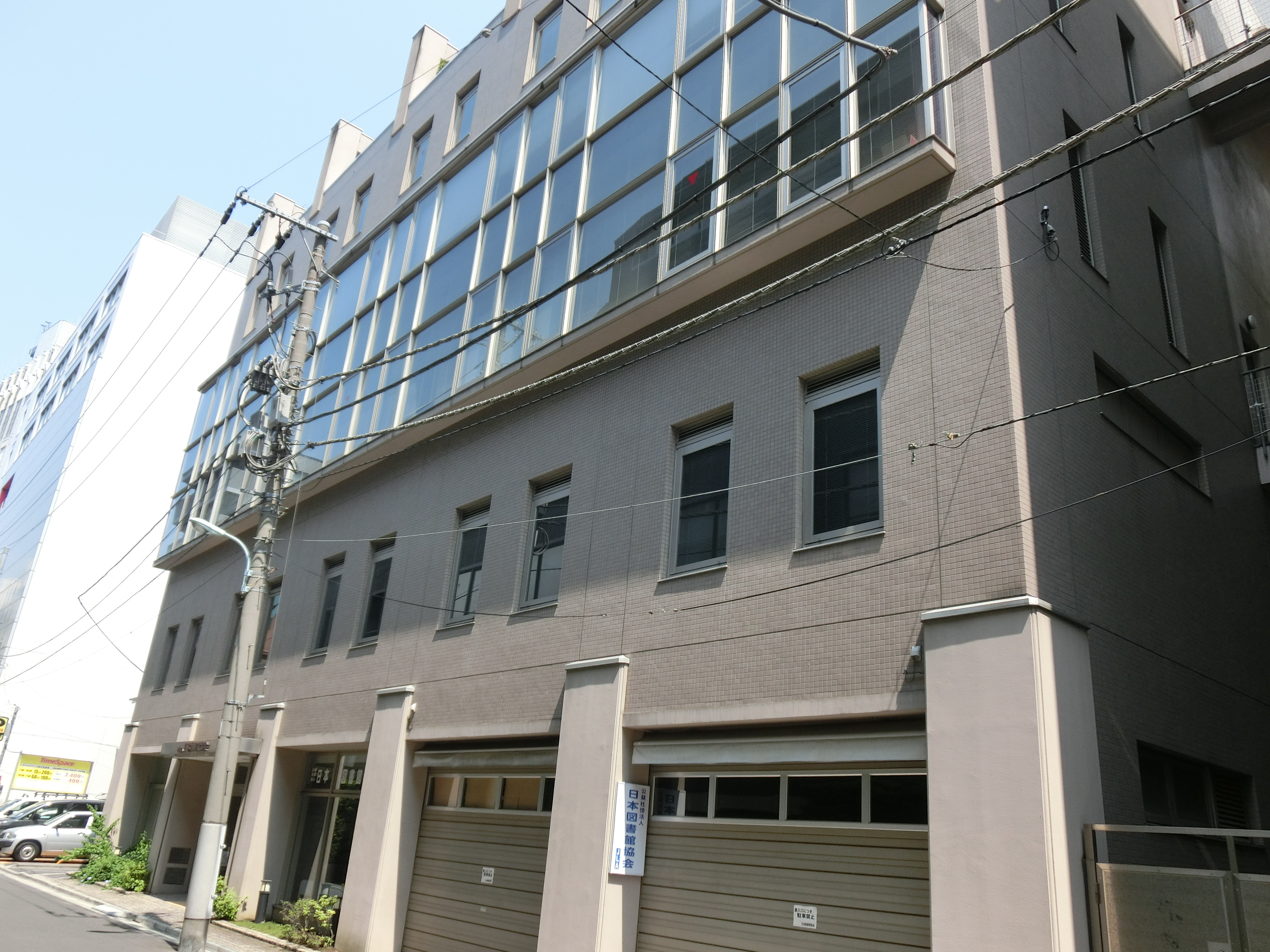
- Formation: 1892
- Coordinates: 35.676761°N 139.782042°E

The Japan Library Association (JLA) (Nihon Toshokan Kyōkai (日本図書館協会)) is a professional organization for librarians in Japan. Its mission is to promote libraries and librarian education throughout Japan. It is also a member of the International Federation of Library Associations.

== History ==
The JLA was established in 1892 as the Nihon Bunko Kyōkai (lit. Japan Book Organization). They changed their name to the Nihon Toshokan Kyōkai in 1907. The organization was founded by Tanaka Inagi, after the American Library Association and the Library Association were founded in 1876 and 1877, respectively. The first annual All-Japan Library Conference was held in 1906, and the JLA began publishing the Toshokan Zasshi a year later in 1907. It became a member of the International Federation of Library Associations in 1929. The JLA became an Incorporated Association in 1930, and began making close ties with the Ministry of Education.

When Japan was under allied occupation after World War II, a law was passed to make Japanese libraries operate similarly to American ones by making them free to use and funded by taxpayers. The JLA also created and implemented the Nippon Decimal Classification system, the Nippon Cataloging Rules, and the Basic Subject Headings. They also adopted a statement on intellectual freedom in 1954.

== Structure ==
The JLA has six divisions that serve different types of libraries, including school, public, special and academic libraries. There is also a division for library education. The JLA also has 29 committees covering topics like intellectual freedom, services to the disabled, and copyright.

Members elect councilors, who make up the decision-making body of the organization. The Board of Councilors elects the Board of Directors, who manage the organization. The chairman of the Board of Directors is the official spokesperson for the JLA.

== Activities ==
=== Conferences ===
The All-Japan Library Association conference is held annually in October. It is held in a different city every year. Many symposiums and lectures are also held throughout the year.

=== Awards ===
The JLA has given out the Library Architecture Award annually since 1985.

== See also ==
- List of library associations
- National Diet Library
