= Public Libraries of New Zealand =

Public library association in New Zealand

Public Libraries of New Zealand represents the Association of Public Library Managers Inc. (APLM), which was set up in 2007 to represent the interests of New Zealand’s public libraries.

The purpose of APLM is to advocate for the information and library needs of the New Zealand public. This involves raising the profile of public libraries and public librarians, promoting and demonstrating the value of public libraries and building strong relationships with those who fund, use and work in public libraries.

APLM's membership is made up of Public Library Managers. This membership is divided into six regions, each of which has an elected representative. APLM is administered by an executive director and governed by an executive committee comprising: Chair, Chair-Elect, Treasurer and the six Regional Reps.
