= Pakistan Library Automation Group =

Pakistani not-for-profit organisation

- Abbreviation: PakLAG
- Formation: 2000
- Purpose: Library automation in Pakistan
- Location: Lahore, Pakistan
- Region served: Pakistan
- President: Khalid Mahmood (Professor)
- Secretary General: Muhammad Ajmal Khan
- Website: http://paklag.org/

Pakistan Library Automation Group (PakLAG) is a not-for-profit trust based in Lahore. It came into existence in year 2000, when some young professionals from the field of Library and Information Science in Pakistan wanted to institutionalise their volunteer work. Lahore based activity soon spread all over the country and volunteers from other provinces and cities joined the efforts to promote the use of ICTs in libraries. PakLAG has its chapters in all four provinces and federal capital. There is no membership fee and no official sponsorship. The idea was to achieve the objectives by promoting the self-reliance and economical solutions.

== Activities ==
Library Information Management System (LIMS): Free software for library housekeeping routines. Used in more than 100 libraries.

Multilingual Web OPAC: First multilingual web OPAC solution is distributed free of cost.

LOC Gateway and Zebra Server: PakLAG promotes the use of Library of Congress Gateway for Web OPACs in Pakistani libraries. Zebra Server (free software under GPL) is used for this purpose. PakLAG provides free help and training to librarians.

Listserv for LIS professionals: First mailing list for librarians in Pakistan. Current members: 4000

Online Directory of LIS Professionals: Contact information of Pakistani librarians.

Training of ICTs and Indexing & Retrieval Tools: Conducted eight workshops for librarians. Introduced many new ICT products for libraries.

PakLAG Koha: PakLAG has localized this open source library software. Local languages are incorporated. Some new features have also been added.

Searchable Database of Journals in National Digital Library: Available at PakLAG website. Journal title, subject, database and publisher searching can be done.

Publication Program: A PhD dissertation has been published. Some software user manuals have also been electronically published on CD-ROM.

Virtual Library: National and international links include web OPACs of libraries, online bookstores, online newspapers, online databases and journals, online directories and other reference sources, LIS resources, and computer science resources.

Free Consultancy in Library Automation: Helps in selection and purchase of hardware and software and advice on retrospective conversion. More than 200 libraries have enjoyed the benefits of this service.

Survey of ICT Training Needs: Conducted a survey of Pakistani librarians to design future training program.
