= Association of Christian Librarians =

Membership association of professional Christian librarians

- Abbreviation: ACL
- Formation: 1957
- Purpose: "The mission of the Association of Christian Librarians is to strengthen libraries through professional development of evangelical librarians, scholarship, and spiritual encouragement for service in higher education."
- Headquarters: Cedarville, Ohio
- Members: 650+ (2024)
- President: Jeremy Labosier (2023-2026)
- Executive Director: Janelle Mazelin
- Website: http://www.acl.org

The Association of Christian Librarians (ACL) is a non-profit, professional organization of librarians whose members are evangelical Christians. The stated mission of the organization is to “strengthen libraries through professional development of evangelical librarians, scholarship, and spiritual encouragement for service in higher education.” ACL holds a national conference each year hosted by one of its member institutions. ACL also publishes The Christian Librarian and the Christian Periodical Index, an index of articles and reviews written from an evangelical point of view labeled as "the leading guide to periodical literature from the evangelical perspective" by the Encyclopedia of Library and Information Sciences.

== History ==
The organization began in 1957 as the Christian Librarians' Fellowship, with seventeen initial members, and has grown slowly over the course of its history. In 1993 it had roughly 300 members, and as of 2024 ACL's membership had grown to over 650 members from 432 unique institutions with 23 countries represented.

== Membership ==
Membership requires profession of the Christian faith as outlined by the association's statement of faith. Associate memberships are available for non-librarians who both agree with the ACL's statement of faith and are interested in libraries or librarianship.

The ACL provides over $20,000 annually in grants to members and their institutions for conference travel and improvement projects.
