= M25 Consortium of Academic Libraries =

British charitable organization

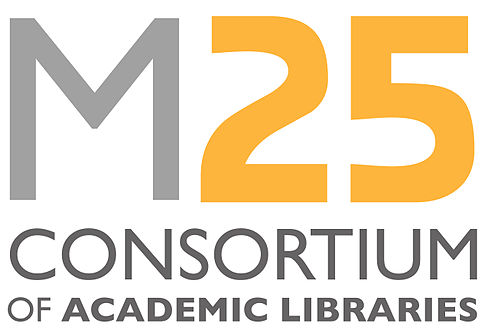
- Type: Library and Information sector
- Established: 1993
- Location: London
- Website: http://www.m25lib.org.uk/

The M25 Consortium of Academic Libraries is a collaborative organisation that works to improve library and information services within the M25 region, and more widely across the East and Southeast of England.

The Consortium has registered charity status, awarded by the Charity Commission of England and Wales in January 2009.

== Structure ==
Since its formation in 1993, with 29 members, the Consortium has continued to expand both its activities and its member base. In 2002, membership was opened up to non-higher education organisations; M25 now currently represents 55 institutions as of 2016.

The Consortium provides a forum for sharing expertise and good practice; it is committed to collaboration as a way of building relationships around libraries, users and collections to bring added value to services. Whilst its direct customers are member libraries, indirect customers include students, academics, and researchers of member institutions (and beyond).

Acting as a single voice for its diverse membership, the Consortium has aimed to represent the interests of academic and research libraries at both regional and national level. It has built working relationships with several information service organisations, including:

- Research Libraries UK
- Jisc
- SCONUL

The Consortium's support team is home based.

== Projects and services ==
The Consortium's work has facilitated a range of services and resources for the benefit of learners and researchers.

- The M25 Web Guide to M25 libraries was launched in 1996, winning a UCISA award in 1997. M25 LINK, launched in 1998, aimed to provide single search access to the OPACs of a subset of six members of the M25 Consortium of Higher Education Libraries.
- M25 Web Guide and M25 Link were replaced in 2001 by the Inform25 suite of services, still in operation: Find a Library enables users to find information about member libraries; the Search Catalogue service allows users to simultaneously search across forty catalogues, with online help and a clear user interface; the Union List of Serials holds data on periodicals in the libraries of the University of London and University of Westminster.
- M25 Access Scheme. Launched in its original form in 1997, this project was influential in the creation of Sconul's 'Research Extra' scheme – a co-operative venture enabling researchers from participating institutions to visit any other participating library and register as an external borrower; Research Extra (and UK Libraries Plus) were then superseded by 'Sconul Access' in 2006. Today the M25 Access Scheme enables library users from those libraries that are not eligible to participate in Sconul Access (i.e. non-HE) to use the services of HE libraries within the Consortium.
- In 2003 cpd25 was launched. Five cpd25 Task Groups, each focusing on different areas of library and information service provision – from legal compliance to building management – devise a yearly programme of Continuing Professional Development events. Training is tailored for library staff, at all stages in their careers, and is open to staff in both member institutions and external libraries. In 2007, cpd25 was awarded CILIP's training and development Seal of Recognition.
- The Consortium has undertaken valuable work in the area of Disaster Planning, the most widely known product of which being the freely available Disaster Control Plan Template, first created in 1997. In addition, since 1999, all Consortium members are signatories to a reciprocal Mutual Support Agreement, under which members will, in the event of a disaster at another institution, endeavour to provide physical access, study spaces, and services to the affected library's users.
- The Consortium has produced a Service Level Definition Template which can be used either as an internal document for library use only or as an external document to express service levels to stakeholders.

== Current and future ==
M25 continues to grow and forge additional partnerships with library sector organisations. On an ongoing basis the Consortium reviews and looks to improve services offered to users; currently it is looking into ways to encourage member libraries to allow walk-in visitor access to electronic resources.

== Member institutions ==
- Aga Khan Library
- Anglia Ruskin University
- University of the Arts London
- The British Library
- The British Museum
- British Medical Association
- British Psychotherapy Foundation
- Buckinghamshire New University
- Canterbury Christ Church University
- Royal Central School of Speech and Drama
- City St George's, University of London
- University of East London
- German Historical Institute London
- Goldsmiths, University of London
- University of Greenwich
- Horniman Museum
- House of Commons Library
- Imperial War Museum
- King's College London
- Kingston University
- Lambeth Palace Library
- London Metropolitan University
- Senate House and SAS Libraries
- London School of Hygiene and Tropical Medicine
- London South Bank University
- Middlesex University
- Northeastern University – London
- The National Gallery
- The National Archives
- Oxford Brookes University
- Queen Mary, University of London
- Ravensbourne University London
- University of Reading
- Regent's University London
- Royal Botanic Gardens, Kew
- Royal College of Art
- Royal College of Nursing
- Royal College of Surgeons of England
- Royal Holloway, University of London
- Royal Horticultural Society
- Royal Society of Chemistry
- Royal United Services Institute
- Royal Veterinary College
- School of Oriental and African Studies, University of London
- Science Museum, London
- St Mary's University College, Twickenham
- University of Buckingham
- University College London
- University for the Creative Arts
- University of Surrey
- University of Sussex
- University of West London
- University of Westminster
- Wiener Holocaust Library
