= Telematics for Libraries Program =

A program of the European Commission, the Telematics for Libraries Program has the ambitious aim of unifying access to information throughout the nations of Europe. This program was launched in 1990 and has since established numerous projects to facilitate in this goal. At the time of its enactment, the Telematics for Libraries Program sought to establish four complementary objectives:

- Computerised bibliographies
- Library networking and interconnection of systems
- Innovative library services
- Technology-based library products and services

These objectives seek to remedy the problems associated with information overload, and establish a unified and simplified way of finding and using information scattered throughout the world.

== Projects ==
Examples are numerous of projects initiated through the Telematics for Libraries Program.

CANDLE(Controlled Access to Network Digital Libraries in Europe) is a project dedicated to digital collections, and facilitates access to these collections through low-cost library management software. This is a collaborative approach between libraries and publishers that encourages publishers to provide digital content while addressing licensing and access control issues. This project has members in several European countries(Greece, Spain, United Kingdom, etc.) In France, Gallica is a relatively new server that will provide users remote access to digital documents contained at the Bibliothèque nationale de France in a variety of formats. The primary aim of this project is for evaluation purposes; to present a multitude of documents and examine their usability through a system of networks. One final example of a program through the Telematics for Libraries Program is the Cultivate UK Web portal. This is a sort of national website, which allows a single point of access for information on European cultural heritage. This portal will allow for the seamless sharing of information through libraries, archives and museums alike. Like the programs mentioned above, the end user is the primary beneficiary of this simplified method of distributing information.

Throughout the 1990s, 820 proposals were submitted under the Telematics for Libraries Program throughout Europe, and 82 projects were launched involving over 400 individual organizations. The program continues to promote programs whose goal is to create a more user-friendly and integrated environment for information seekers throughout Europe.
