= Academic Library Advancement and Development Network =

Canadian and US library networking organization

The Academic Library Advancement and Development Network (ALADN) is a community of practice supporting professionals involved in library development and advancement in the United States and Canada. The group "is designed to offer networking and mutual problem-solving for professionals involved in advancement and development for academic and research libraries through annual conference, electronic listserv participation (LIBDEV sponsored by ALADN), and personal contacts". Three standing committees and a rotating conference planning group compose ALADN's structure.

ALADN's beginning was rooted in a conference hosted by the University of New Mexico Libraries held March 15-17, 1995, titled "More than Books: Building a Network of Academic and Research Library Development Officers".

ALADN's LIBDEV listserv and its archives are hosted by the University of Florida.

== Conferences ==
Year	Dates	Location	Host	Website
2020	April 19-21	San José, CA	San José State University Santa Clara University	
2019	May 19-21	Louisville, KY	SAALCK (State Assisted Academic Library Council of Kentucky)	Website
2018	May 19-22	Fort Worth, TX	University of North Texas; Texas Christian University; Texas Woman's University; University of Texas at Arlington; Baylor University; University of Texas at Austin	Website
2017	May 20-23	Cleveland, OH	Case Western Reserve University	
2016	June 1-4	Boston, MA	University of Massachusetts Amherst	Website
2015	April 18-21	San Diego, CA	San Diego State University; University of California, San Diego; University of San Diego	Website
2014	May 18-21	Kansas City, MO	University of Kansas; Kansas State University; University of Missouri-Kansas City; University of Nebraska–Lincoln	
2013	May 19-22	Pittsburgh, PA	University of Pittsburgh; Gale Cengage Learning	Website
2012	May 20-23	Vancouver, BC, Canada		
2011	May 16-19	Flagstaff, AZ		
2010	March 20-24	Santa Monica, CA		
2009	April 26-29	Williamsburg, VA		
2008	June 1 - 4	Austin, TX		
2007	May 18-21	Banff, Alberta, Canada		
2006	March 27-30	Las Vegas, NV		
2005	March 6-9	New Orleans, LA		
2004	March 27-29	Miami, FL		
2003	March 23-26	Tucson, AZ		
2002	March 17-20	San Antonio, TX		
2001	April 1-4	Washington, DC		
2000	April 2-5	Pacific Grove, CA		
1999	March 7-10	Kansas City, MO		
1998	March 8-11	Athens, GA		
1997	March 4-7	Island of Kaua'i, HI		
1996	March 6-8	Irvine, CA		

== See also ==
- List of libraries in the United States
- List of libraries
