= Congress of Southeast Asian Librarians =

Southeast Asian regional library organisation (est. 1970)

- Abbreviation: CONSAL
- Formation: 1970
- Founded at: Singapore
- Purpose: Connect and grow librarians and libraries in Southeast Asia
- Region served: Southeast Asia
- Awards: Outstanding Librarian Award; Young Librarian Award
- Website: https://www.consal.org/

The Congress of Southeast Asian Librarians (CONSAL) is an international library organization that connects libraries throughout the Southeastern Asia region. It was founded in 1970 in Singapore with the goal of supporting and growing information and library science throughout the region.

== History ==
The formation of CONSAL was inspired by the creation of the ASEAN organizations in 1970. It has long connections to the national libraries of all its member countries, including the National Library of Malaysia, National Library in Singapore, National Library of the Philippines, National Library of Vietnam, National Library of Thailand, National Library of Myanmar, National Library of Cambodia, National Library of Laos, National Library of Indonesia, and many other public and private library institutions.

== Members and affiliates ==
CONSAL includes libraries, schools, associations, and organizations across Brunei, Cambodia, Indonesia, Laos, Malaysia, Myanmar, Philippines, Singapore, Thailand, and Vietnam. Timor-Leste began joining CONSAL meetings as an observer and participant, but not an official member, in 2011 at the CONSAL XV.

=== Leadership ===
==== Main Committee Chair ====
Ghazali Mohamed Fadzil (2025)

==== Secretary General ====
Chin Loy Jyoon (2022-2025)

Dr. Nor Edzan Che Nasir (2022-2025)

Ramachandran Rasu Naidu (2000-2003)

== Conferences, awards, and programs ==
CONSAL typically holds a General Conference & Meeting for its members every three years, with each member country alternating the role as host. The 20th CONSAL Meeting will be held in Singapore in 2028.

CONSA L General Conferences & Meetings
Conference	Year	Location	Theme(s)	Events	Ref.
CONSAL XIX	2025	World Trade Center Kuala Lumpur, Malaysia	Inclusive Knowledge: Bridging Divides, Empowering All: Leveraging Inclusivity, Empowering Humanity		
CONSAL XVIII	2022	Virtual, Cambodia			
CONSAL XVII	2018	Naypyidaw, Myanmar	Next Generation Libraries: Collaborate and Connect		
CONSAL XVI	2015	Bangkok, Thailand	ASEAN Aspirations: Libraries for Sustainable Advancement		
CONSAL XV	2012	Bali, Indonesia	National Heritage: Preservation and Dissemination		
CONSAL XIV	2009	Melia Hotel, Hanoi, Vietnam	Towards Dynamic Libraries and Information Services in Southeast Asian Countries		
CONSAL XIII	2006	De La Salle University, Manila, Philippines	CONSAL at the Crossroads: Challenges for Greater Regional Cooperation		
CONSAL XII	2003	Bandar Seri Begawan, Brunei Darussalam	Information Empowerment: Enhancing Knowledge Heritage	Myanmar joined.	
CONSAL XI	2001	Suntec City, Singapore	Stepping into the New Millennium: Challenges for Library and Information Professionals	Cambodia, Laos, and Vietnam joined the organization. Held at the same time as the Asian International Book Fair and the International Library Expo. The CONSAL Outstanding Librarian Award was first announced.	
CONSAL X	1996	Kuala Lumpur, Malaysia	Libraries in National Development		
CONSAL IX	1993	Bangkok, Thailand	Future Dimensions and Library Development		
CONSAL VIII	1990	Jakarta, Indonesia	New Challenges in Library Services in the Developing World		
CONSAL VII	1987	Manila, Philippines	Libraries for Countryside Development in Southeast Asia		
CONSAL VI	1983	Singapore	The Library in the Information Revolution	This coincided with the National Library of Singapore's 25th anniversary.	
CONSAL V	1981	Kuala Lumpur, Malaysia	Access to Information		
CONSAL IV	1978	Bangkok, Thailand	Regional Cooperation for the Development of National Information Services	The organization was renamed the Congress of Southeast Asian Librarians.	
CONSAL III	1975	Jakarta, Indonesia	Integrated Library and Documentation Services Within the Framework of NATIS		
CONSAL II	1973	Manila, Philippines	Education and Training for Librarianship in Southeast Asia		
CONSAL I	1970	Singapore	New Prospects for Southeast Asian Cooperation		

Since 2002, CONSAL has hosted the annual CONSAL Outstanding Librarian Award and the CONSAL Young Librarian Award.

CONSAL Outstanding Librarian Award Recipients
Conference	Award	Receipient	Country of origin	Ref.
CONSAL XIX 2025	Gold	Chin Loy Jyoon	Malaysia	
CONSAL XIX 2025	Silver	Woro Titi Haryanti	Indonesia	
CONSAL XIX 2025	Bronze	Elvira Lapuz	Philippines	
CONSAL XIX 2025	Bronze	Dr. Tassana Hanpol	Thailand	
CONSAL XVIII 2022	Gold	Dr. Nor Edzan Che Nasir	Malaysia	
CONSAL XVIII 2022	Silver	Myat Sann Nyein	Myanmar	
CONSAL XVIII 2022	Silver	Suchit Suvaphab	Thailand	
CONSAL XVII 2018	Gold	Mila Medina Ramos	Philippines	
CONSAL XVII 2018	Silver	Pham The Khang	Vietnam	
CONSAL XVII 2018	Silver	Dr. Chutima Sacchanand	Thailand	
CONSAL XVII 2018	Silver	Dr. Hlaing Glaing Gyi	Myanmar	
CONSAL XVII 2018	Silver	Ahmad Syawqi	Indonesia	
CONSAL XVI 2015	Gold	Dr. Chutima Sacchanand	Thailand	
CONSAL XVI 2015	Silver	Rashidah Begum Fazal Mohamed	Malaysia	
CONSAL XVI 2015	Silver	Nyuyen Huy Chuong	Vietnam	
CONSAL XVI 2015	Silver	Tulus Juni	Indonesia	
CONSAL XVI 2015	Silver	Dr. Marilou Palicte Tadlip	Philippines	
CONSAL XVI 2015	Silver	Dr. Mohd Sharif Saad	Malaysia - posthumous	
CONSAL XV 2012	Gold	Suherman Mli	Indonesia	
CONSAL XV 2012	Silver	Aaron Tay Chee Hsien	Singapore	
CONSAL XV 2012	Silver	Bui Xuan Duc	Vietnam	
CONSAL XIV 2009	Gold	Zawiyah Baba	Malaysia	
CONSAL XIV 2009	Silver	Salmudi	Indonesia	
CONSAL XIV 2009	Silver	Salvacion M. Arlante	Philippines	
CONSAL XIV 2009	Silver	Kiang-Koh Lai Lin	Singapore	
CONSAL XIV 2009	Silver	Nguyen Minh Hiep	Vietnam	
CONSAL XIII 2006		R. Ramachandran	Singapore	
CONSAL XII 2003		Dr. Zaiton Osman	Malaysia	
First Award 2002		Antonio M. Santos	Philippines	

CONSAL Young Librarian Award Recipients
Conference	Recipient	Country of origin	Ref.
CONSAL XIX 2025	Dr. Mayasari Abdul Majid	Malaysia	

== See also ==
- Library and information science
- List of library associations
