= Asociación Mexicana de Bibliotecarios =

Professional librarian association in Mexico

Mexican Library Association
- Motto: Leadership in Action
- Founder: Juan Bautista Iguíniz
- Established: Founded:1924 Recognized: 1956
- President: Brenda Cabral Vargas
- Staff: Board of Directors: María Guadalupe Vega Díaz - Vice President Alejandro Machorro Nieves María Dolores Barrios López Francisco Esquivel de Reyo Vianney García López
- Location: Mexico
- Website: https://ambac.org.mx/

The Asociación Mexicana de Bibliotecarios A. C. (AMBAC) is a professional association of librarians in Mexico. It operates from headquarters in Colonia del Valle in the Benito Juarez borough of Mexico City. The organization began in 1924 as the Asociación de Bibliotecarios Mexicanos, reformed in 1954. Two years later AMBAC became legally recognized. (Note: Other professional librarians' groups in Mexico have included the Asociación de Bibliotecarios de Instituciones de Educación Superior (ABIESI), Asociación de Bibliotecarios de Instituciones Gubernamentales de México (ABIGMAC), Asociación Nacional de Bibliotecarios Agropecuarios (ANBAGRO), Bibliotecarios en Biomedicina (BIBAC), and the Colegio Nacional de Bibliotecarios (CNB).) Presidents of the organization have included Tobías Chávez Lavista, Ario Garza Mercado, Adolfo Rodríguez Gallardo, and Saúl Armendáriz Sánchez. The group runs an annual conference, the Jornadas Mexicanas de Biblioteconomía (est. 1956).

== Mission and vision ==
AMBAC's Mission:

"La AMBAC es la asociación civil vinculada a la gestión bibliotecaria en todos sus aspectos como el fomento y desarrollo de las bibliotecas, sus servicios de información y su participación con el desarrollo comunitarios a través de sus actividades de extensión."

"The AMBAC is the civil association linked to library management in all its aspects such as the promotion and development of libraries, their information services and their participation in community development through their outreach activities"

AMBAC'S Vision:

"Queremos seguir siendo la organización líder de bibliotecarios que impulse el desarrollo laboral y profesional de sus asociados donde las acciones que realicen desde sus centros de trabajo repercutan directamente en el desarrollo sostenible de nuestro país de manera incluyente."

"We want to continue to be the leading organization for librarians that promotes the labor and professional development of its associates, where the actions they carry out from their work has a direct impact on the sustainable development of our country in an inclusive manner."

== See also ==
- List of libraries in Mexico
