= Association of European Research Libraries =

Professional association of research libraries in Europe

LIBER (Ligue des Bibliothèques Européennes de Recherche – Association of European Research Libraries)
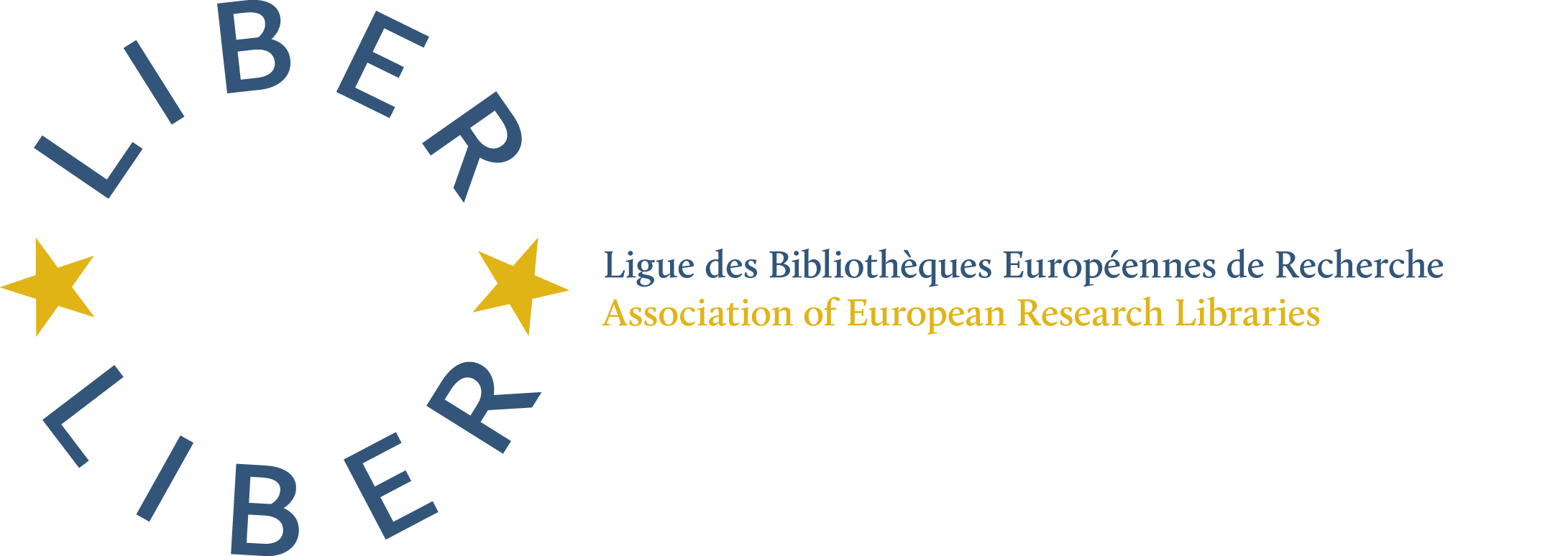
- Formation: 1971; 55 years ago
- Location: The Hague, Netherlands
- President: Kristiina Hormia-Poutanen
- Website: libereurope.eu

The Association of European Research Libraries (Ligue des Bibliothèques Européennes de Recherche or LIBER) is a professional association of national and university research libraries in Europe. As of 2018 its membership includes some 400 organizations. It operates as a Dutch foundation, with headquarters in the Koninklijke Bibliotheek in The Hague.

== Overview ==
The origin of LIBER sprang from a 1968 meeting of the International Federation of Library Associations. Among its founders was Swiss librarian Jean-Pierre Clavel.

LIBER held its first conference in Strasbourg in 1971, and continues meeting annually. Its 2026 conference will take place in Trondheim. The group also publishes an open access journal about librarianship, LIBER Quarterly.

== Presidents ==
- Elmar Mittler, circa 1999–2002
- Erland Kolding Nielsen, circa 2005
