= Guam Library Association =

Professional association for librarians in Guam

- Nickname: GLA
- Formation: 1965, 1989
- Parent organization: American Library Association
- Website: guamlibraryassociation.org

The Guam Library Association (GLA) is a professional organization for Guam's librarians and library workers based in Hagatna. It was founded in 1965 and became an affiliate of the American Library Association in 1967, an affiliation which it lost in 1975 and regained sometime in the late 1980s. GLA is also a member of the Pacific Islands Association of Libraries, Archives, and Museums. Membership in the association is open to librarians and library workers, but also to the general public who are interested in improving the civilian and military libraries of Guam.

There was an earlier group in Guam also called the Guam Library Association, but it was created in 1947 in order to support the formation of public libraries on Guam. GLA was dormant for a period of time in the 1970s and 1980s and officially "re-launched" in 1989.

== See also ==
- List of libraries in the United States
