= European Theological Libraries =

Theological library association

Bibliothèques Européennes de Théologie (BETH)
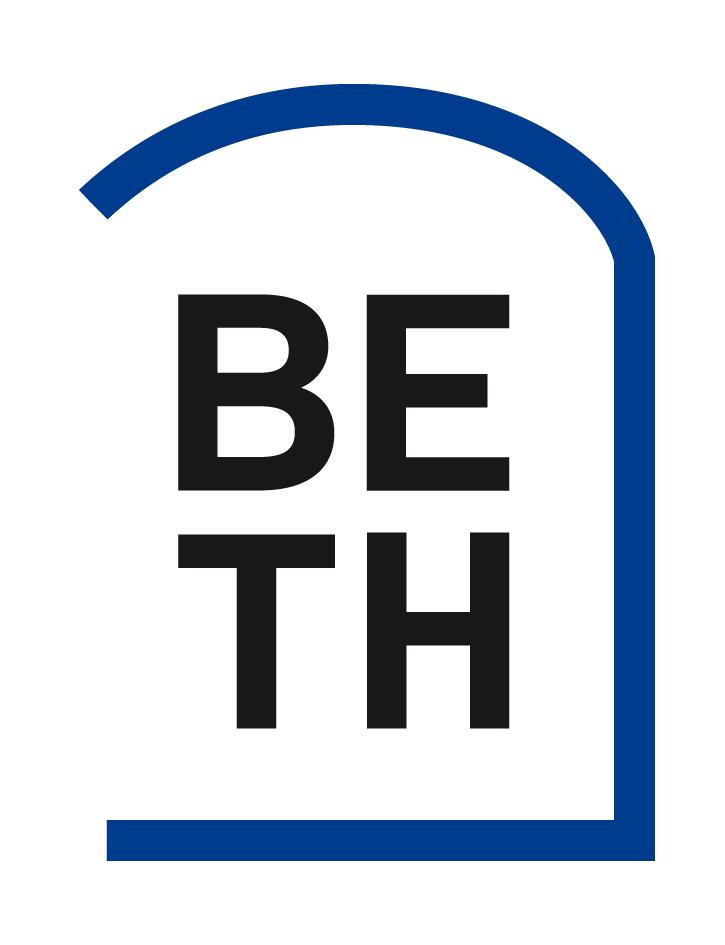
- Formation: 26 September 1973
- Type: International nongovernmental organization
- Location: Kampen, Netherlands
- President: Stefano Malaspina
- Website: https://beth.eu/

European Theological Libraries (French: Bibliothèques européennes de théologie, BETH) is an ecumenical federation of European national theological library associations as well as single libraries. The association was founded in 1961 and has a legal registration in Kampen, Netherlands. BETH aims to contribute to the development of theological libraries in Europe by building networks, establishing contacts, supporting and promoting cooperation between European theological libraries, and working for the preservation of the rich cultural patrimony founded in them. BETH has member associations and libraries in 15 European countries. Each year BETH organizes an annual meeting in different European cities. The topics of the annual meetings reflect the challenges of modern theological librarianship like the future of the theological libraries, digitization, open access, information literacy, etc.

== History ==
In 1957, at the occasion of the tenth anniversary of the Arbeitsgemeinschaft Katholisch-Theologischer Bibliotheken, three theological librarians and Catholic priests from France, Netherlands, and the UK gathered in Frankfurt and created the outline for an association that prefigured what was to become BETH. These librarians were: Father Luchesius Smits (VKSB, Vereniging voor Seminarie- en Kloosterbibliothecarissen, The Netherlands), Father Francis Courtney (ABTAPL, United Kingdom), and Father Paul Mech (Association des bibliothèques de sciences religieuses, France).

In the spirit of reconstruction and reconciliation that was characteristic for the period after World War II, they wanted to contribute to the growth of the Christian faith by developing exchange between libraries specialized in religious studies. They considered it necessary to improve the professional level of these libraries, to work on international bibliographies, and to work together for their common objectives. "They considered it as an apostolic mission not just to take responsibility of the conservation of the valuable collections of the books of the seminaries and monasteries, but also to make them available to a wider audience."

It was in Frankfurt, however, four years later, on 18 October 1961 at a meeting of German theological libraries that the International Committee for the Coordination of Catholic Theological Library Associations (le Comité international de coordination des associations de bibliothèques de théologie catholique) was established. This committee brought together librarians from Germany, France and the Netherlands and had a rather informal structure. After some ten years, the members decided to create a formal association. In 1970, the ‘Committee’ became the International Council of Theological Library Associations (le Conseil international des associations de bibliothèques de théologie) and included several national associations. The statutes of the new association were adopted in a meeting held on 26 September 1973, and the association received royal approval in the Netherlands. The secretarial office of the association was in Nijmegen.

During the following years, several national associations joined the Council, which, in turn, joined IFLA (1971-1986).

From 1961 to 1999 several joint publications speak for the common efforts of the council: Scripta recenter edita, which is current bibliography of philosophical and theological works, was published from 1950 to 1973, and Bibliographia ad usum seminariorum, a selection of the necessary tools for theological studies (liturgical, missiological, ecumenical) from 1959 to 1965.

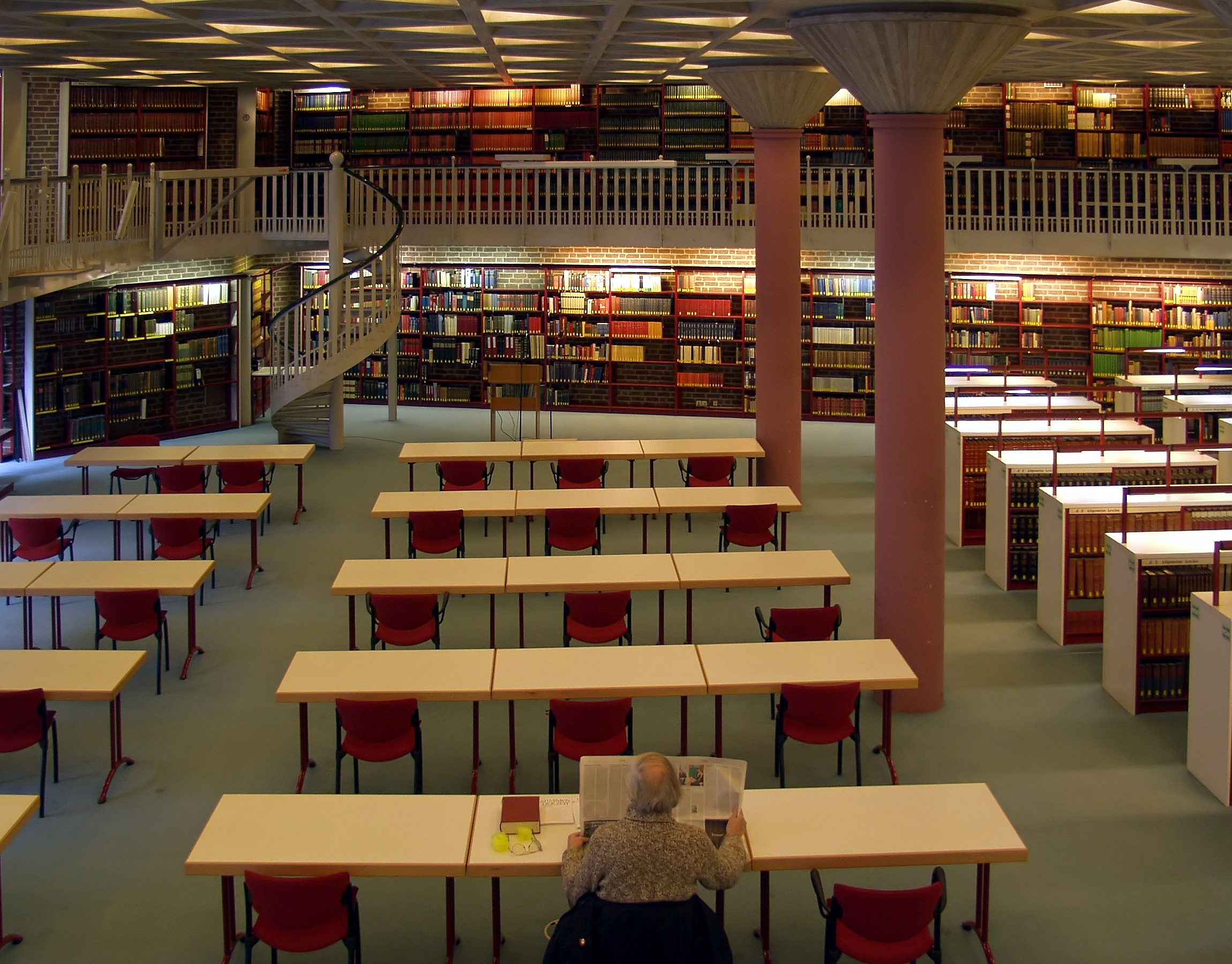
Archbishop's Diocesan and Cathedral Library in Cologne, Germany

Very soon after its creation, the International Council of Theological Library Associations began to publish a listing of science of religion periodicals, both active and terminated ones, that were in collections of its member libraries. The members of the national associations made a thorough survey of libraries in their countries to clarify the history of each title, and then these files were circulated among the other members who could supplement, correct and localize the data. This effort that was started back in the 1960s was laborious and took a long time. Out of this work emerged only one single publication, Clavis foliorum periodicorum, which covered the periodicals in Belgium, the Netherlands, and Luxemburg and was published in 1994 by Peeters.

Carried on more or less effective in the different member countries, this project was finished at the beginning of the 2000s at the same time when the old catalogues were digitized and new digital catalogues were created. Although the project was halted in its initial stage, it provided the national associations with a tool that could be used by their member libraries.

In 1999, the council, to emphasize the specifically European character of its activities, changed the name of the association into BETH: Bibliothèques Européennes de Théologie / European Theological Libraries / Europäische Bibliotheken für Theologie, equipped with a website that is until today administrated by the Leuven Catholic University (KULeuven).
