= Pakistan Library Association =

Pakistani apex body of libraries

- انجمن کتابخانه های پاکستان
- Abbreviation: PLA
- Formation: 1957
- Type: Registered body under societies Act XXI of 1960 of Pakistan
- Location: Pakistan
- Region served: Pakistan
- President: Dr. Saeed Ullah Jan (Professor)
- Secretary General: Muhammad Khan Marwat
- Assistant Secretary General: Zeeshan Ullah

The Pakistan Library Association (PLA) is a representative national body of librarians in Pakistan. It was formed in Karachi in March 1957. It is responsible for looking after the interests of the professional librarians who work for the development and improvement of libraries both in formal and informal sectors of education and research. It also acts as a liaison between Pakistani organizations with similar aims and objectives as international library organizations and promotes the image of librarians in society.

Prior to the formation of PLA there was the Pakistan Bibliographical Working Group (PBWG) which promoted library activities. According to Dr. Anis Khurshid, an ad hoc committee meeting of the PBWG on 6 July 1954 chaired by H. A. Qazi formed a National Association for Librarians. The committee members included Syed Vilayat Hussain, Khawaja Noor Elahi, Fazal-e-Elahi and Akhtar H. Siddiqui.

The PLA is a registered body under the Societies Act XXI of 1960. Its membership is open to all library professionals of the country. The association has organized 18 conferences so far. In addition to regular meetings, the PLA arranges library seminars, workshops, discussions, book exhibitions, etc. It also has published a newsletter and a quarterly journal entitled PLA Journal. The association has a headquarters and five branches in four provincial capitals and the Federal Capital, Islamabad. The headquarters of the PLA rotates between Karachi, Lahore, Islamabad, Peshawar and Quetta every two years. Its present council is in Quetta, Baluchistan with Prof. Abdul Baqi Baloch as its president.
