= Librarian =

Profession

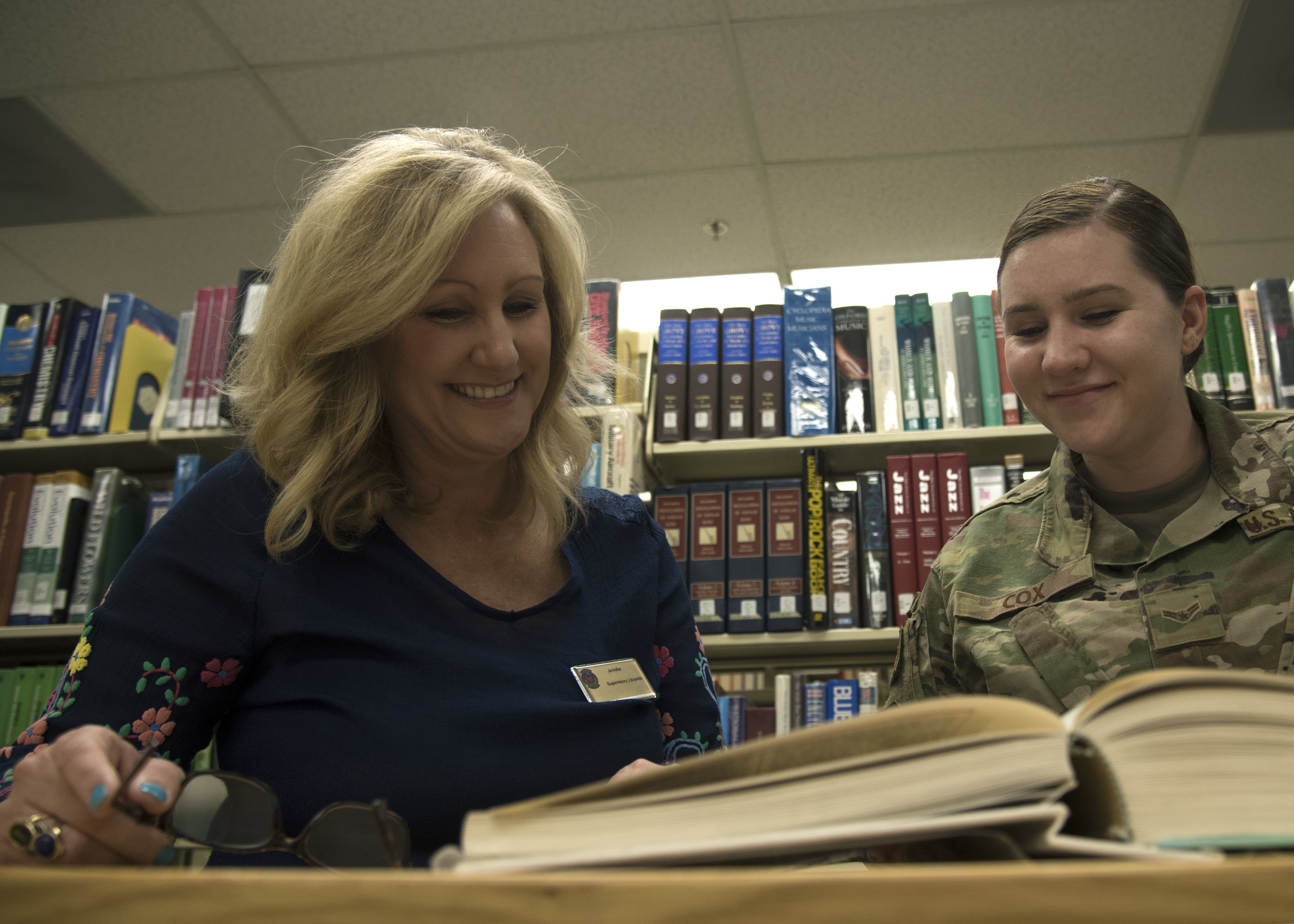
- A librarian in a military base library helps an airman find an entry in a book.

Occupation
- Synonyms: Information professional, information specialist
- Occupation type: Profession

Description
- Education required: Three or four-year bachelor's degree plus a number of years of experience as a Library technician under the supervision of a librarian; in some countries a post-graduate master's degree, in particular the Master of Library and Information Science (MLIS), is required; while specialist librarians in addition may need a relevant subject degree (e.g. JD, MBA, MPA, MPP, MPH, MSW, MA, MS, M.Ed., PhD, MD, Ed.D) or occupational licensing (e.g. Library Media Specialist Certification, Certified Teacher Credential).
- Fields of employment: Public library, academic library, special library, research library, research institute, think tank, consulting firm, law firm, legislature, court, school, college/university
- Related jobs: Archivist, curator, library technician, knowledge manager, research assistant, academic staff (professor, teacher)

A librarian is a person who professionally works with information management. The professional duties of librarians encompass a wide range of activities, including the provision of access to information, the conduct of research, the creation and management of information systems, the creation, leadership, and evaluation of educational programs, and the provision of instruction on information literacy to users.

The role of the librarian has evolved significantly over time, particularly in the past century, which has witnessed the emergence of numerous media and technologies. From the earliest libraries in the ancient world to the modern information hub, there have been individuals responsible for the maintenance and dissemination of information stored in data repositories. The roles and responsibilities of librarians vary considerably based on factors such as the nature of the library, the librarian's area of expertise, and the functions essential for the maintenance of collections and their accessibility to users.

Education for librarianship has undergone a transformation over time, adapting to the evolution of its roles and responsibilities.

== History ==
=== The ancient world ===
The Sumerians were the first to train clerks to keep records of accounts. "Masters of the books" or "keepers of the tablets" were scribes or priests who were trained to handle the vast amount and complexity of these records. The extent of their specific duties is unknown.

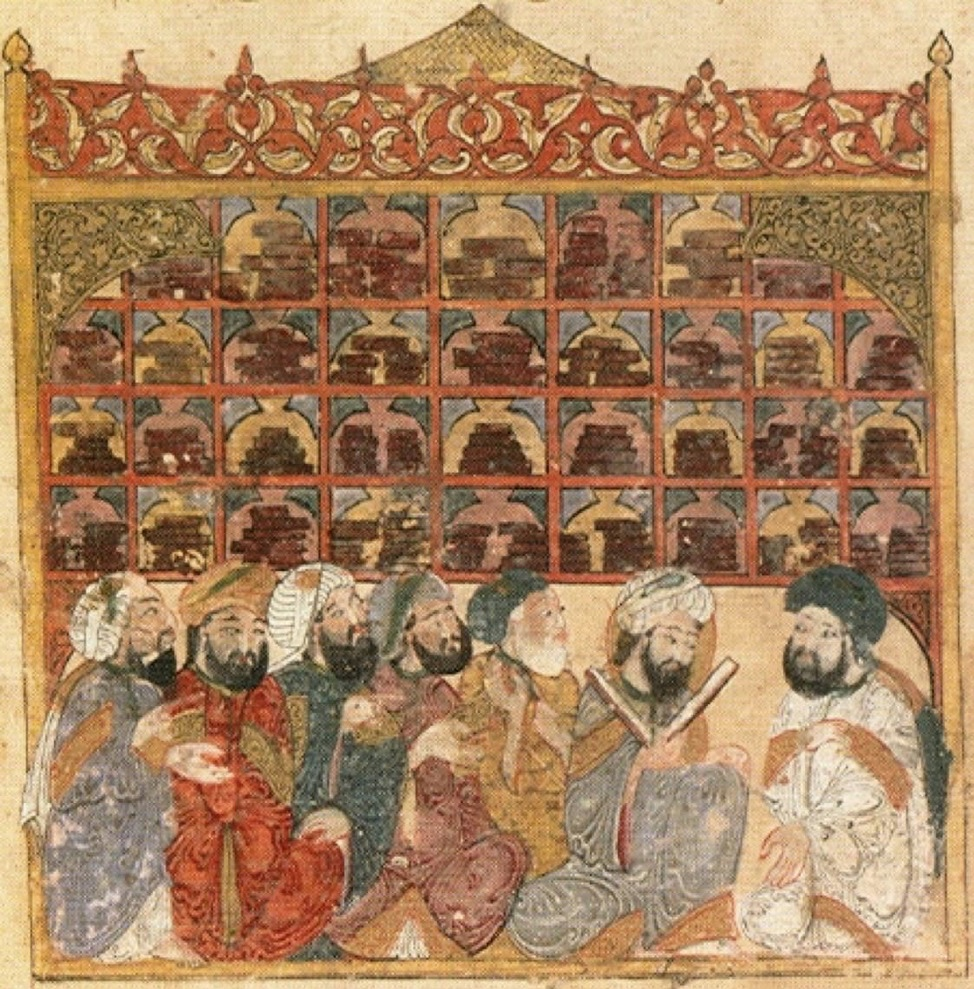
Scholars at an Abbasid library in Baghdad (13th century)

Sometime in the 8th century BC, Ashurbanipal, King of Assyria, created a library at his palace in Nineveh in Mesopotamia. Ashurbanipal was the first individual in history to introduce librarianship as a profession. We know of at least one "keeper of the books" who was employed to oversee the thousands of tablets on Sumerian and Babylonian materials, including literary texts; history; omens; astronomical calculations; mathematical tables; grammatical and linguistic tables; dictionaries; and commercial records and laws. All of these tablets were cataloged and arranged in logical order by subject or type, each having an identification tag.

The Great Library of Alexandria, created by Ptolemy I after the death of Alexander the Great in 323 BC, was created to house the entirety of Greek literature. It was notable for its famous librarians: Demetrius, Zenodotus, Eratosthenes, Apollonius, Aristophanes, Aristarchus, and Callimachus. These scholars contributed significantly to the collection and cataloging of the wide variety of scrolls in the library's collection. Most notably, Callimachus created what is considered to be the first subject catalog of the library holdings, called the pinakes. The pinakes contained 120 scrolls arranged into ten subject classes; each class was then subdivided, listing authors alphabetically by titles. The librarians at Alexandria were considered the "custodians of learning".

Near the end of the Roman Republic and the beginning of the Roman Empire, it was common for Roman aristocrats to hold private libraries in their home. Many of these aristocrats, such as Cicero, kept the contents of their private libraries to themselves, only boasting of the enormity of his collection. Others, such as Lucullus, took on the role of lending librarian by sharing scrolls in their collection. Many Roman emperors included public libraries into their political propaganda to win favor from citizens. While scholars were employed in librarian roles in the various emperors' libraries, there was no specific office or role that qualified an individual to be a librarian. For example, Pompeius Macer, the first librarian of Augustus' library, was a praetor, an office that combined both military and judicial duties. A later librarian of the same library was Gaius Julius Hyginus, a grammarian.

=== Middle Ages and Renaissance ===
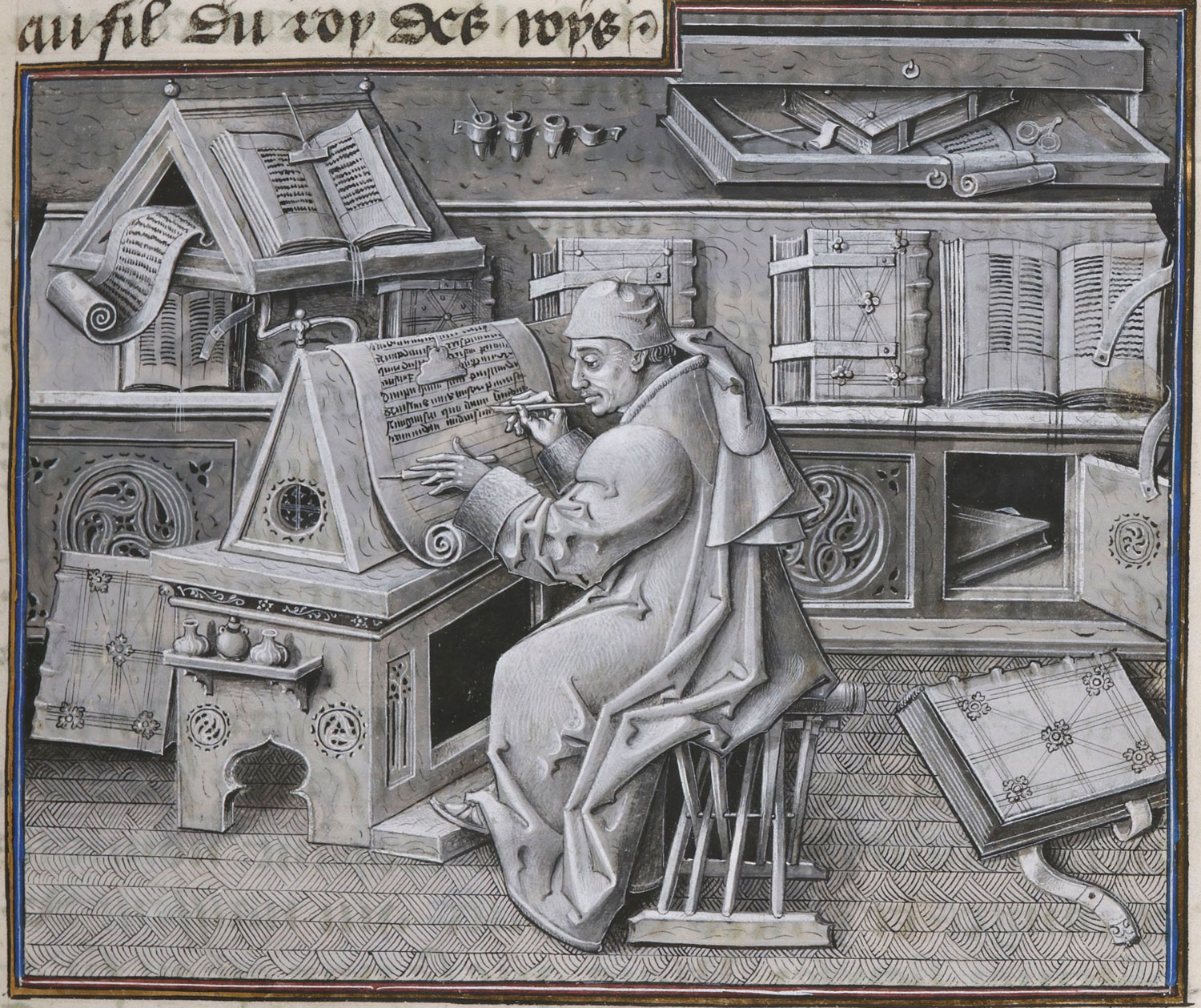
Burgundian scribe Jean Miélot in his scriptorium (15th century)

Christian monasteries in Europe are credited with keeping the institution of libraries alive after the fall of the Roman Empire. It is during this time that the first codex (book as opposed to scroll) enters popularity: the parchment codex. Within the monasteries, the role of librarian was often filled by an overseer of the scriptorium where monks would copy out books cover to cover. A monk named Anastasias who took on the title of Bibliothecarius (literally "librarian") following his successful translations of the Greek classicists. During this period, the lectern system, in which books were chained to desks for security, was also introduced. Classification and organization of books during this period was generally done by subject and alphabetically, with materials inventoried using basic check lists. Later in the period, individuals known as librarii (singular librarius) began more formal cataloguing, inventory, and classification.

In the 14th century, universities began to reemerge which had libraries and employed librarians. At the same time royalty, nobles and jurists began to establish libraries of their own as status symbols. King Charles V of France began his own library, and he kept his collection as a bibliophile, an attribute that is closely connected to librarians of this time.

The Renaissance is considered to be a time of aristocratic enthusiasm for libraries. During this period, great private libraries were developed in Europe by figures such as Petrarch and Boccaccio. These libraries were sponsored by popes, royals, and nobility who sent agents throughout Western Europe to locate manuscripts in deteriorating monastic libraries. As a result, Renaissance libraries were filled with a wealth of texts. While materials in these libraries were mostly restricted, the libraries were open to the public. Librarians were needed to plan and organize libraries to meet public needs. A tool to achieve these organizational goals, the first library catalog, appeared in 1595.

=== Enlightenment era ===
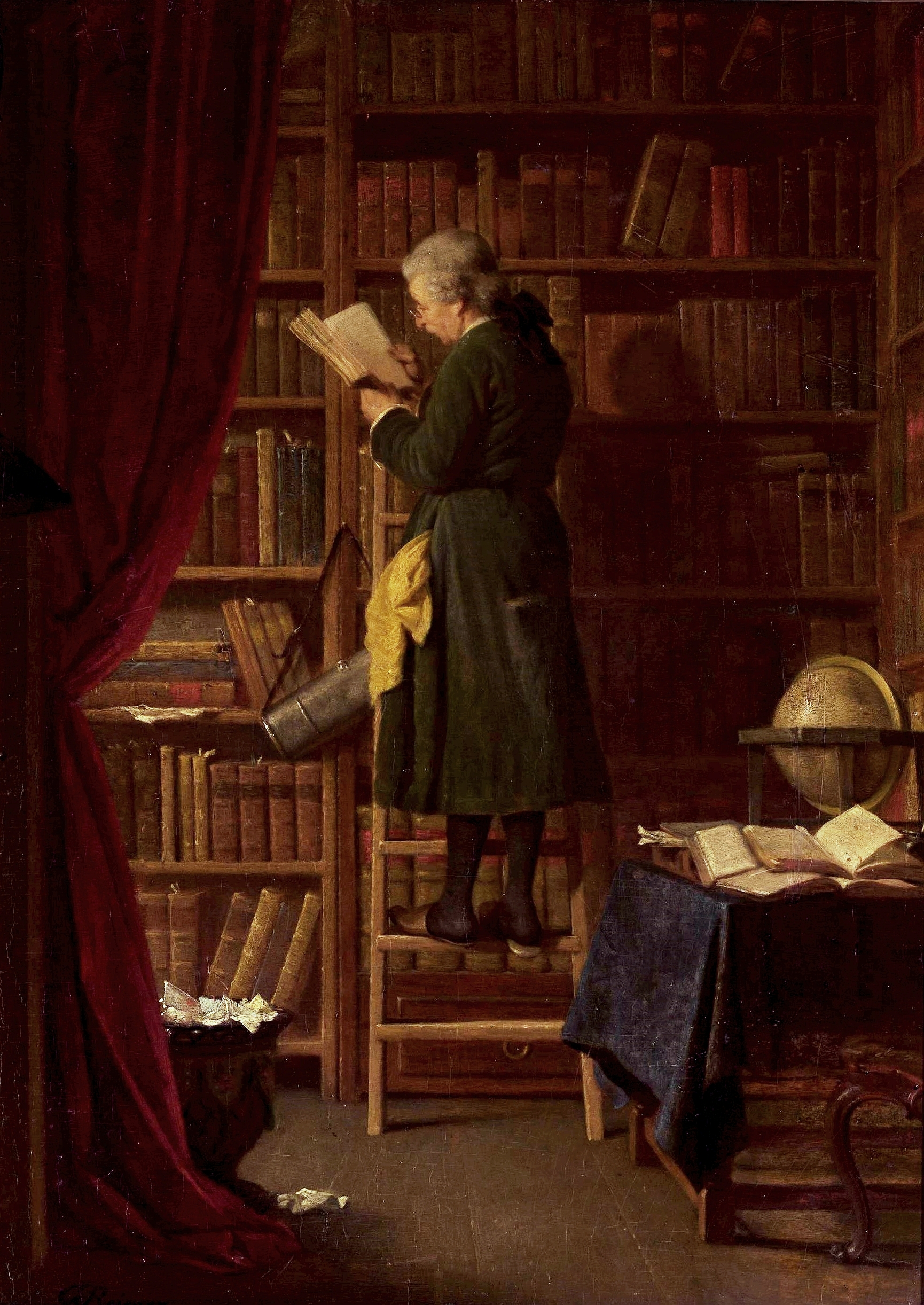
Enlightenment era librarian in a library, 19th-century painting by Georg Reimer, National Museum in Warsaw

During the 16th century, the idea of creating a Bibliotheca Universalis, a universal listing of all printed books, emerged from well-established academics and librarians: Conrad Gessner, Gabriel Naudé, John Dury, and Gottfried Leibniz. The four librarians responsible for establishing the Bibliotheca Universalis are important figures in librarianship. Gabriel Naudé published Avis pour dresser une bibliothèque, the first printed monograph on librarianship. In this monograph, Naudé advocated collecting all kinds of books, old and new, of famous, more obscure, and heretical authors. He also contributed to the idea of organization and administration of libraries which led to the development of library collections. It was also in part thanks to Naudé that some libraries began to lend books outside of the precincts of the library.

John Dury is considered to be the first English library theorist. He wrote two letters to Samuel Hartlib concerning the duties of a professional librarian, which were published in 1650 as "The Reformed Librarie-Keeper". He held that librarians should not only care for the books, but should also be well educated and accomplished to raise the standards of librarianship. Furthermore, he advocated that librarians deserve a living wage in order to use their energy to perform their duties to the fullest extent. Gottfried Leibniz upheld that the librarian was the most important factor in the aid of learning. He is credited as including science texts in addition to conventional literature within library collections.

Another key figure of this time, Sir Thomas Bodley, gave up his career as a diplomat and established Oxford's Bodleian library. He is credited as creating the first functional library of modern times. Subsequent librarians following Bodley were called Protobibliothecarius Bodleianus, Bodley's Librarian. They would earn £40 a year. The ideas formed with these librarians continued to develop into the 17th century. With the approach of Bibliotheca Universalis, libraries changed; the content of libraries became less selective, to include literature of entertainment as well as academic value. At this time, libraries also became fully open to the public, with access no longer restricted to a small circle of readers.

In 18th-century France, two librarians, Hubert-Pascal Ameilhon and Joseph Van Praet, selected and identified over 300,000 books and manuscripts that became the property of the people in the Bibliothèque Nationale. During the French Revolution, librarians assumed sole responsibility for selecting books for use by all citizens of the nation. Out of this action came the implementation of the concept of modern library service: the democratic extension of library services to the general public, regardless of wealth or education.

=== Modern era ===
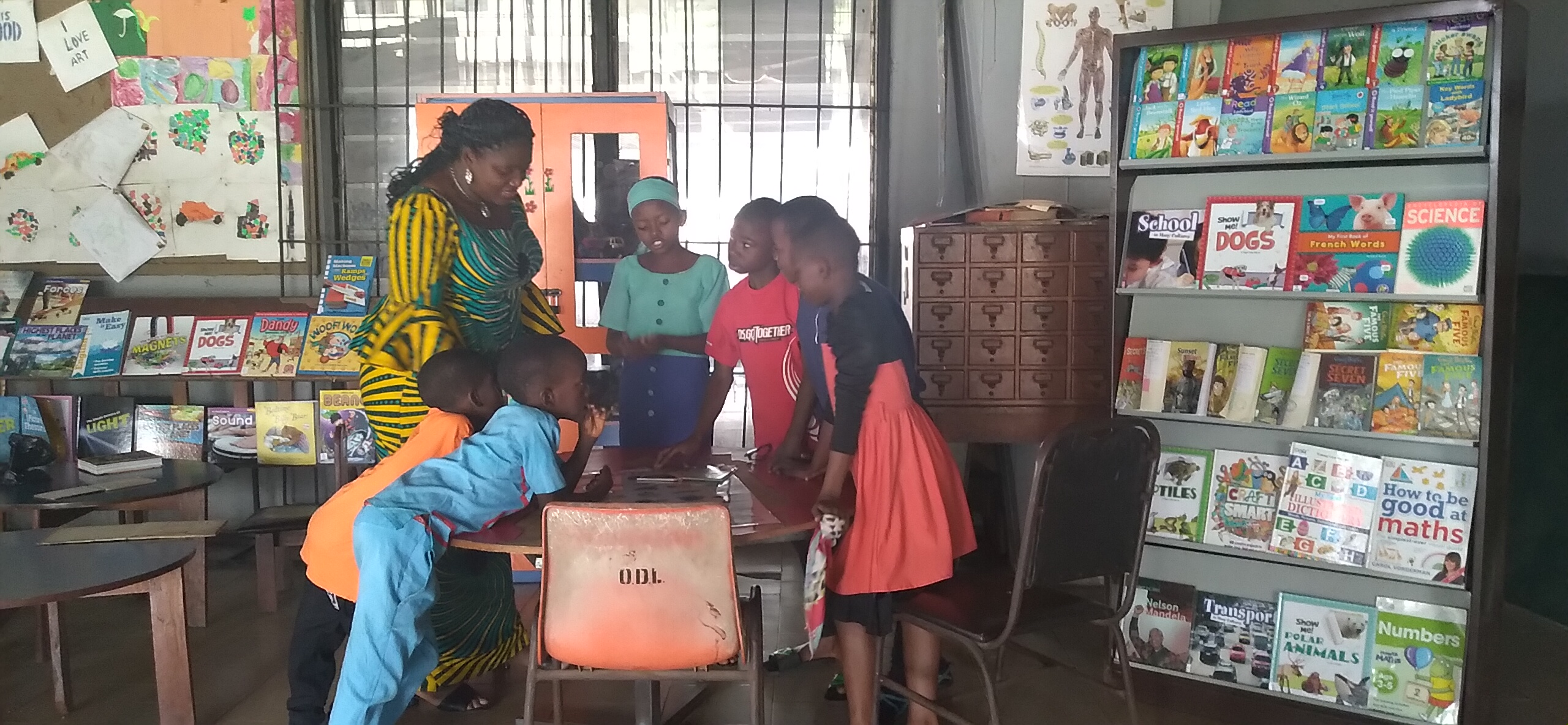
Children's reading in public library in Anambra State Nigeria

While there were full-time librarians in the 18th century, the professionalization of the library role was a 19th-century development, as shown by its first training school, its first university school, and its first professional associations and licensing procedures.

In England in the 1870s, a new employment role opened for women in libraries; it was said that the tasks were "Eminently Suited to Girls and Women." By 1920, women and men were equally numerous in the library profession, but women pulled ahead by 1930 and comprised 80% by 1960. The factors accounting for the transition included the demographic losses of the First World War, the provisions of the Public Libraries Act 1919, the library-building activity of the Carnegie United Kingdom Trust, and the library employment advocacy of the Central Bureau for the Employment of Women. In the United Kingdom, evidence suggests that the Conservative government began replacing professional librarians with unpaid volunteers in 2015–2016.

=== COVID-19 pandemic in the US ===
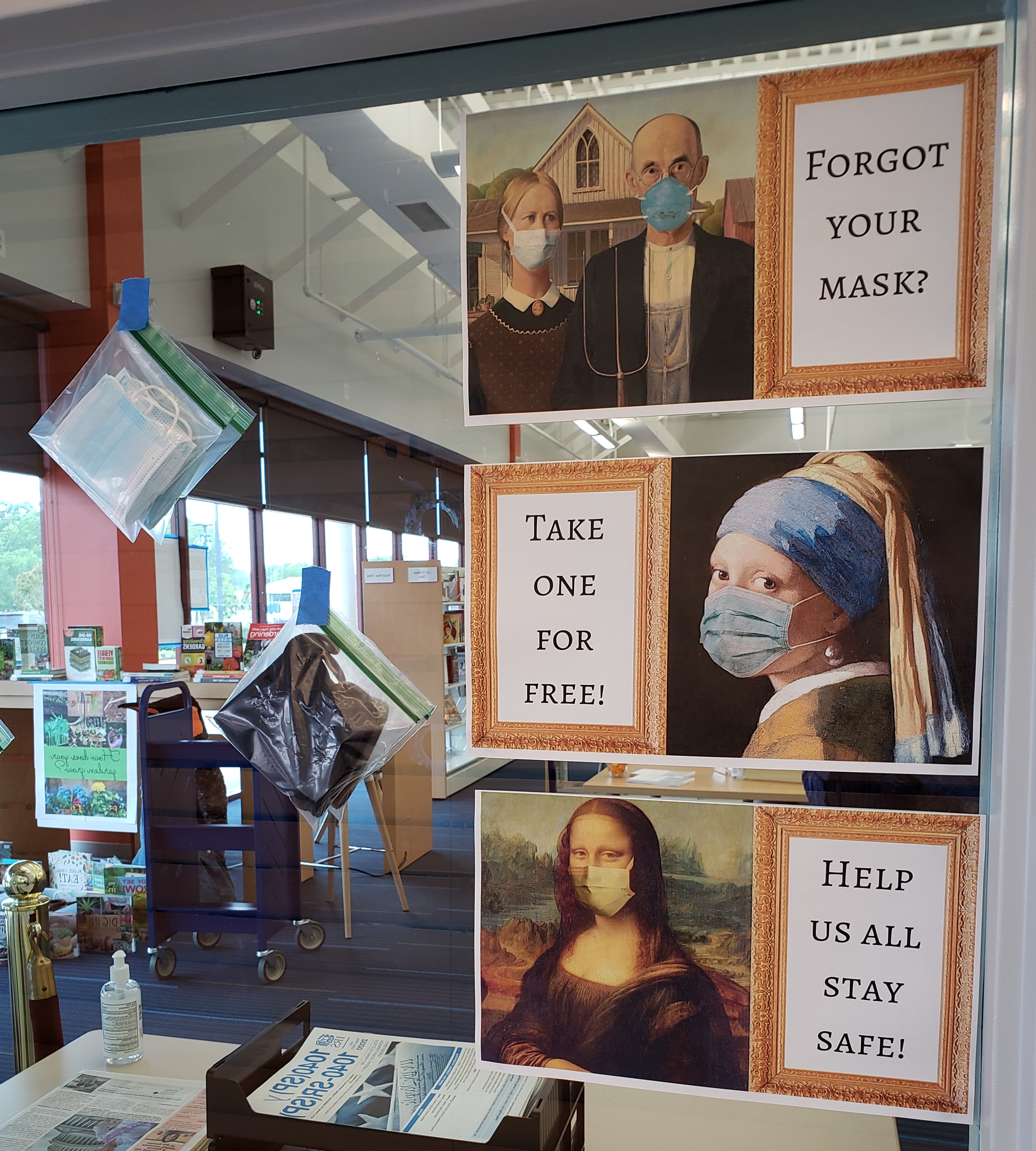
Mask display at the Manassas City Library during the COVID-19 pandemic

During the COVID-19 pandemic in the United States in 2020, many librarians were temporarily displaced as libraries across the country were affected by a nationwide shutdown in efforts to control the spread of SARS-CoV-2 disease. During this time, library services were in high demand as patrons were stuck inside during quarantine, but with limited building access, most public library patrons switched to digital content, online learning, and virtual programs.

As the crisis escalated, there was a high demand for contact tracers, and the CDC had earlier named librarians as key public health staff to support COVID-19 case investigation and contact tracing, so many librarians and library staff volunteered to help with contact tracing. Librarians also supported their community in other ways, such as staffing non-emergency hotlines and manning shelters for the homeless, for which they were able to retain their income, while others were furloughed for a time.

The Librarian Reserve Corps was formed during the COVID-19 pandemic. It was a global network of volunteer librarians, specializing in academic libraries and medical libraries, serving as "information first responders" in the fight against the Infodemic as a direct result of COVID-19 pandemic. The Librarian Reserve Corps Literature Enhancement and Metadata Enrichment (LIME) volunteers, led by Jessica Callaway, vetted, indexed, and helped disseminate resources about COVID-19 to various organizations, including the Global Outbreak Alert and Response Network (GOARN) and the World Health Organization. As of November 2021, the Librarian Reserve Corps has vetted over 60,000 publications relating to COVID-19. The Librarian Reserve Corps founder, Elaine Hicks, and co-leadership Stacy Brody and Sara Loree, were awarded the 2021 Librarian of the Year title from Library Journal.

== Roles and responsibilities ==
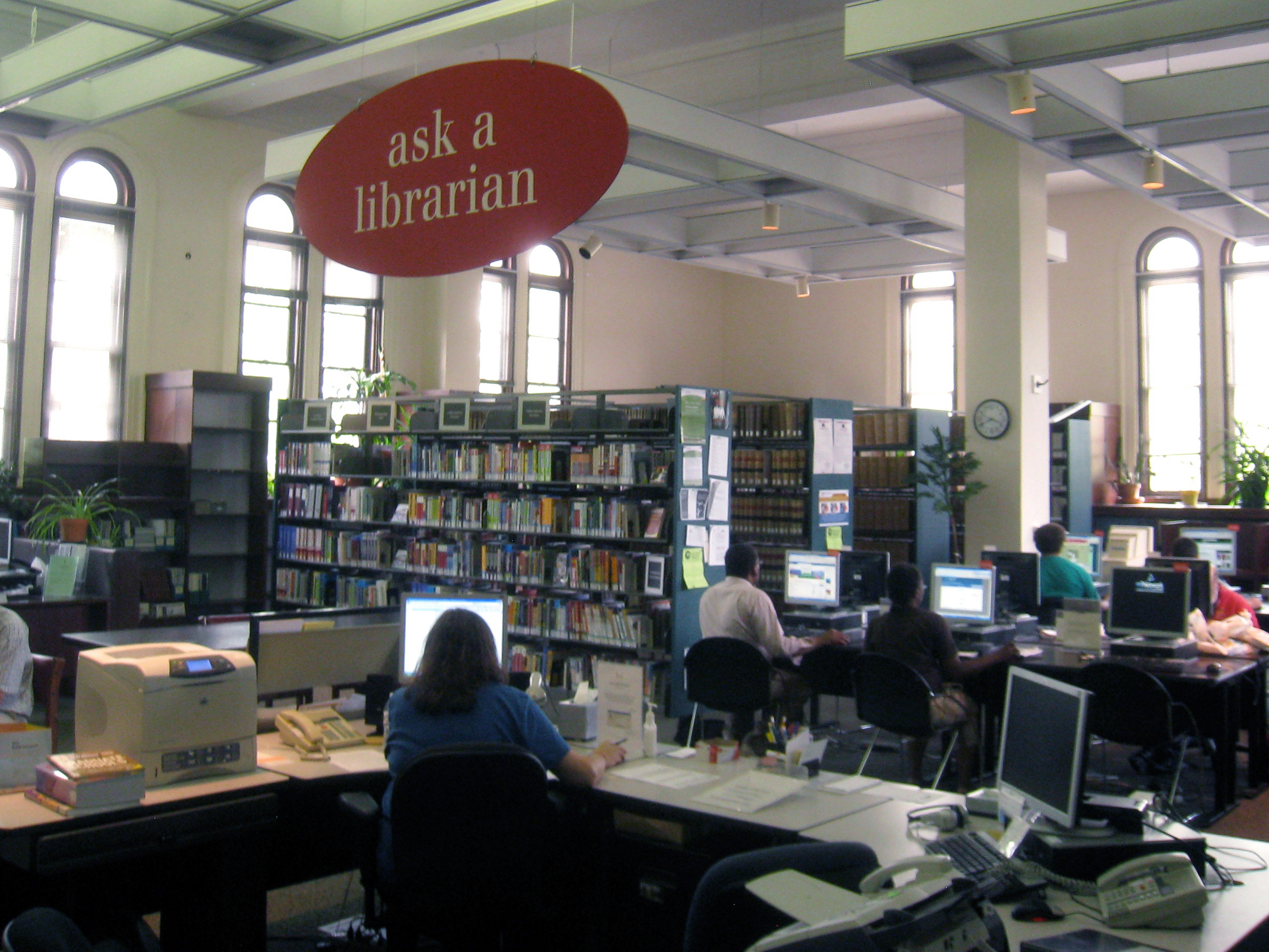
Librarian at work

Traditionally, a librarian is associated with collections of books, as demonstrated by the etymology of the word "librarian" (from the Latin liber, "book"). A 1713 definition of the word was "custodian of a library", while in the 17th century, the role was referred to as a "library-keeper", and a librarian was a "scribe, one who copies books".

The role of a librarian is continually evolving to meet social and technological needs. A modern librarian may deal with provision and maintenance of information in many formats, including books; electronic resources; magazines; newspapers; audio and video recordings; maps; manuscripts; photographs and other graphic material; bibliographic databases; and Internet-based and digital resources. A librarian may also provide other information services, such as information literacy instruction; computer provision and training; coordination with community groups to host public programs; assistive technology for people with disabilities; and assistance locating community resources.

The Internet has had a profound impact on the resources and services that librarians of all kinds provide to their patrons. Electronic information has transformed the roles and responsibilities of librarians, even to the point of revolutionizing library education and service expectations.

=== Positions and duties ===
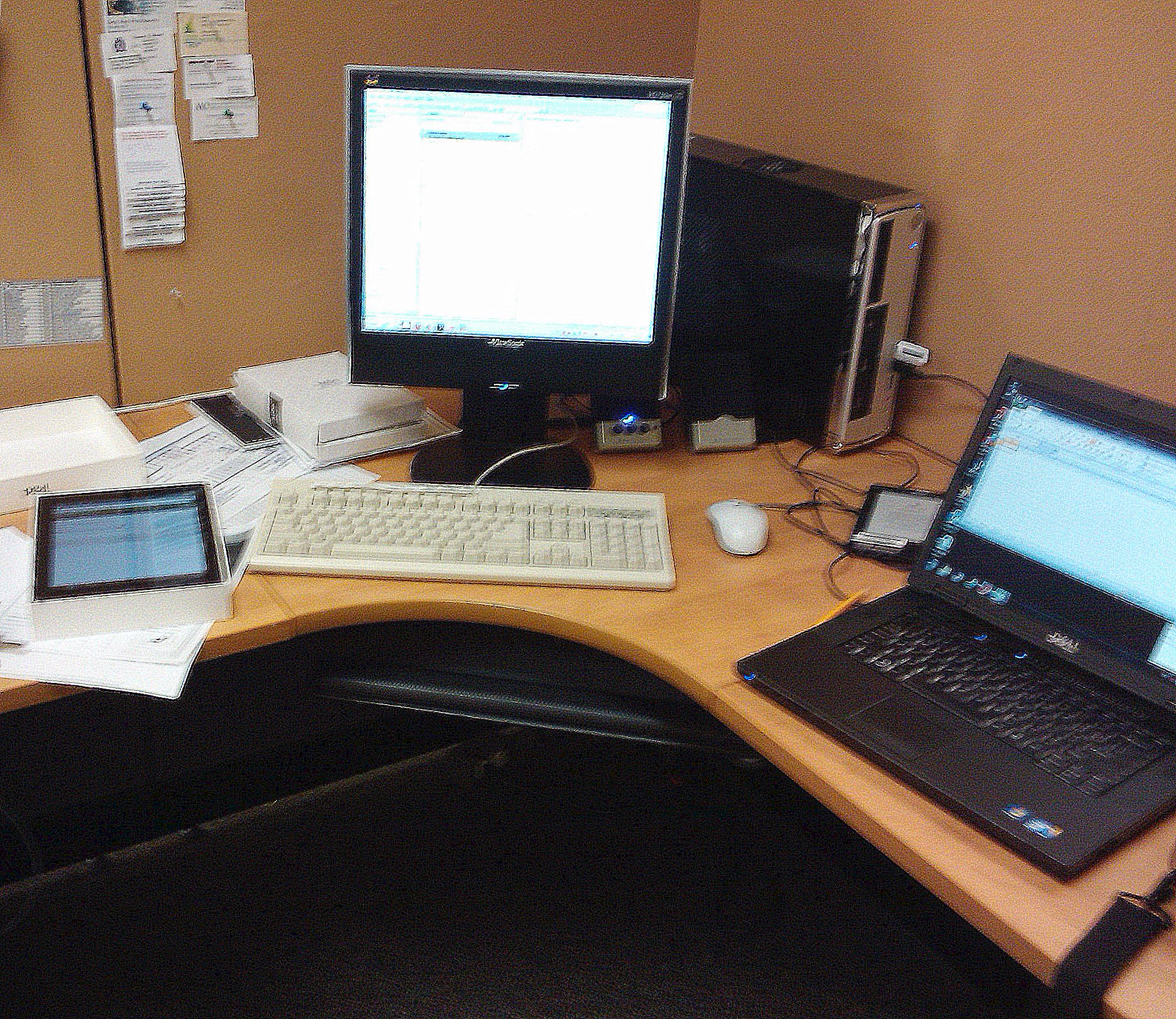
A librarian's workspace at Newmarket Public Library in 2013. iPad, PC, eReader and laptop computer are required tools

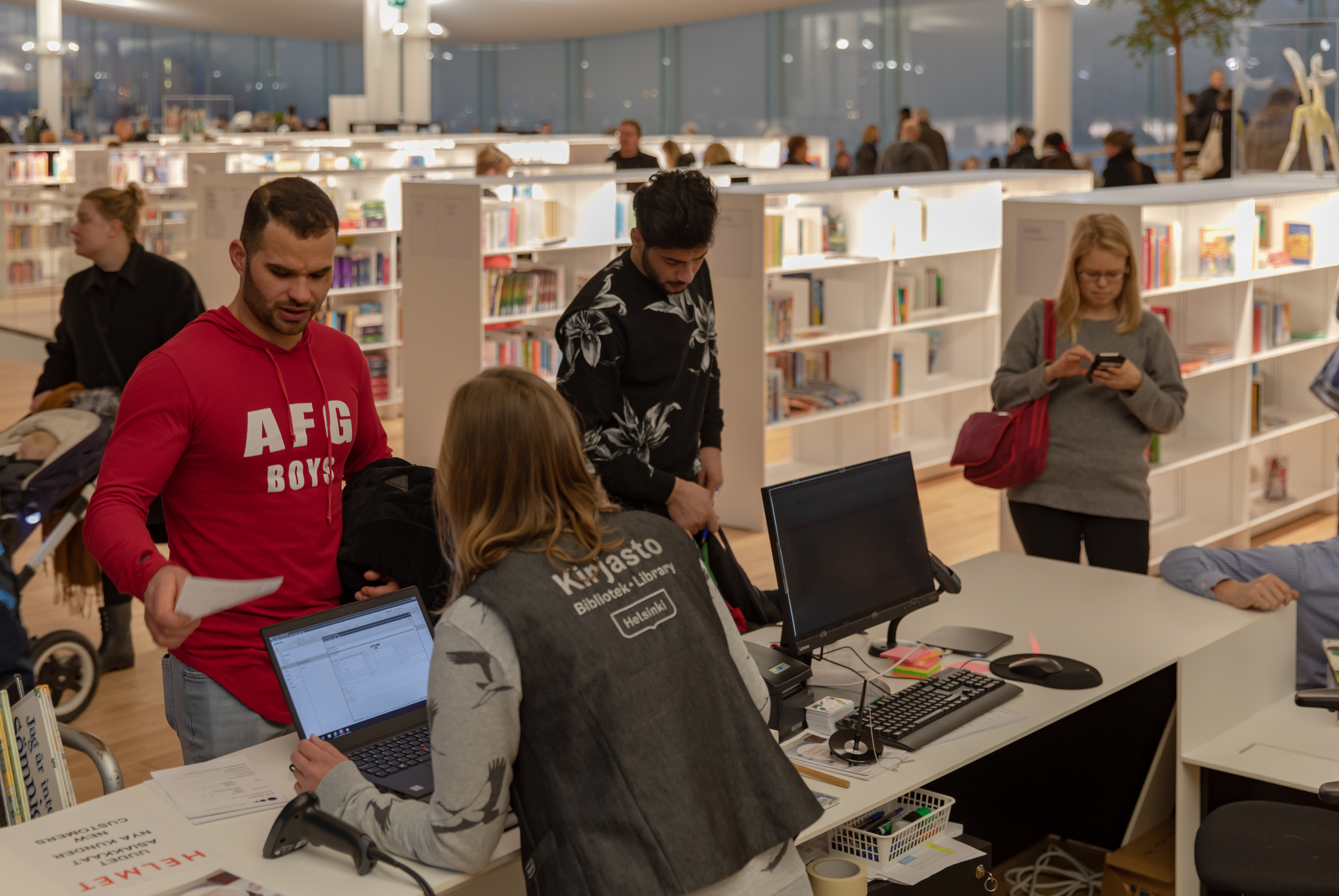
Patrons at Helsinki Central Library

Specific duties vary depending on the size and type of library. Olivia Crosby described librarians as "Information experts in the information age." Most librarians spend their time working in one of the following areas of a library: Archivists can be specialized librarians who deal with archival materials, such as manuscripts, documents and records, though this varies from country to country, and there are other routes to the archival profession.

Collection development or acquisitions librarians monitor the selection of books and electronic resources. Large libraries often use approval plans, which involve the librarian for a specific subject creating a profile that allows publishers to send relevant books to the library without any additional vetting. Librarians can then see those books when they arrive and decide if they will become part of the collection or not. All collections librarians also have a certain amount of funding to allow them to purchase books and materials that don't arrive via approval.

Electronic resources librarians manage the databases that libraries license from third-party vendors. School librarians work in school libraries and perform duties as teachers, information technology specialists, and advocates for literacy. Instruction librarians teach information literacy skills in face-to-face classes or through the creation of online learning objects. They instruct library users on how to find, evaluate, and use information effectively. They are most common in academic libraries.

Media specialists teach students to find and analyze information, purchase books and other resources for the school library, supervise library assistants, and are responsible for all aspects of running the library/media center. Both library media teachers (LMTs) and young adult public librarians order books and other materials that will interest their young adult patrons. They also must help YAs find relevant and authoritative Internet resources. Helping this age group to become lifelong learners and readers is a main objective of professionals in this library specialty.

Outreach librarians are charged with providing library and information services for underrepresented groups, such as people with disabilities, low-income neighborhoods, home bound adults and seniors, incarcerated and ex-offenders, and homeless and rural communities. In academic libraries, outreach librarians might focus on high school students, transfer students, first-generation college students, and minorities.

Public service librarians work with the public, frequently at the reference desk of lending libraries. Some specialize in serving adults or children. Children's librarians provide appropriate material for children at all age levels, include pre-readers, conduct specialized programs and work with the children (and often their parents) to help foster interest and competence in the young reader. (In larger libraries, some specialize in teen services, periodicals, or other special collections.)

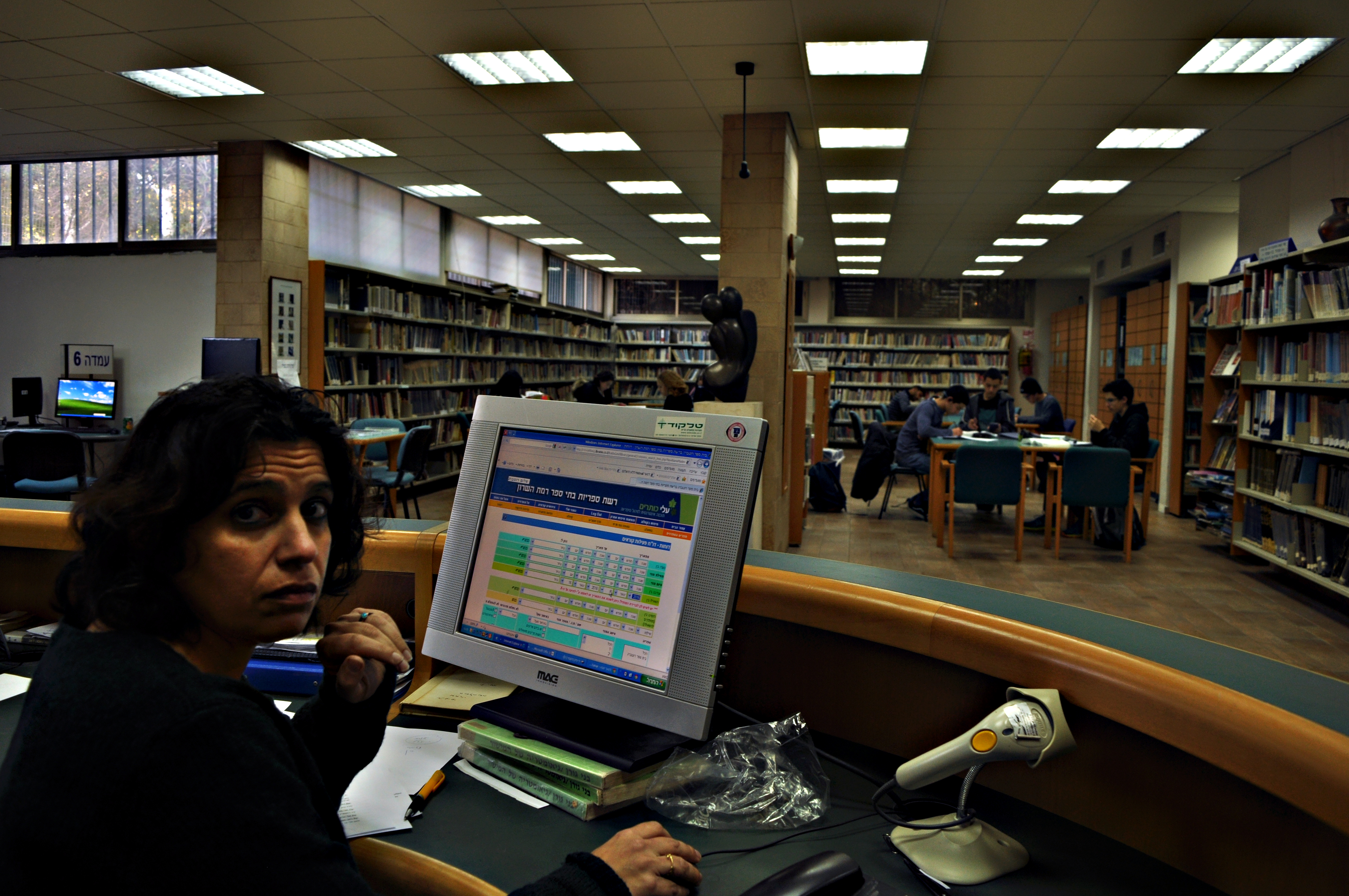
Librarian at desk in a high school library

Reference or research librarians help people doing research to find the information they need, through a structured conversation called a reference interview. The help may take the form of research on a specific question, providing direction on the use of databases and other electronic information resources; obtaining specialized materials from other sources; or providing access to and care of delicate or expensive materials. These services are sometimes provided by other library staff that have been given a certain amount of special training; some have criticized this trend.

Systems librarians develop, troubleshoot and maintain library systems, including the library catalog and related systems. Technical service librarians work "behind the scenes" ordering library materials and database subscriptions, computers and other equipment, and supervise the cataloging and physical processing of new materials. A Youth Services librarian, or children's librarian, is in charge of serving young patrons from infancy all the way to young adulthood. Their duties vary, from planning summer reading programs to weekly story hour programs. They are multitaskers, as the children's section of a library may act as its own separate library within the same building. Children's librarians must be knowledgeable of popular books for school-aged children and other library items, such as e-books and audiobooks. They are charged with the task of creating a safe and fun learning environment outside of school and the home.

A young adult or YA librarian specifically serves patrons who are between 12 and 18 years old. Young adults are those patrons that look to library services to give them direction and guidance toward recreation, education, and emancipation. A young adult librarian could work in several different institutions; one might be a school library/media teacher, a member of a public library team, or a librarian in a penal institution. Licensing for library/media teacher includes a Bachelor or Master of Arts in Teaching and additional higher-level course work in library science. YA librarians who work in public libraries are expected to have a master's degree in Library and Information Science (MLIS), relevant work experience, or a related credential.

=== Additional responsibilities ===
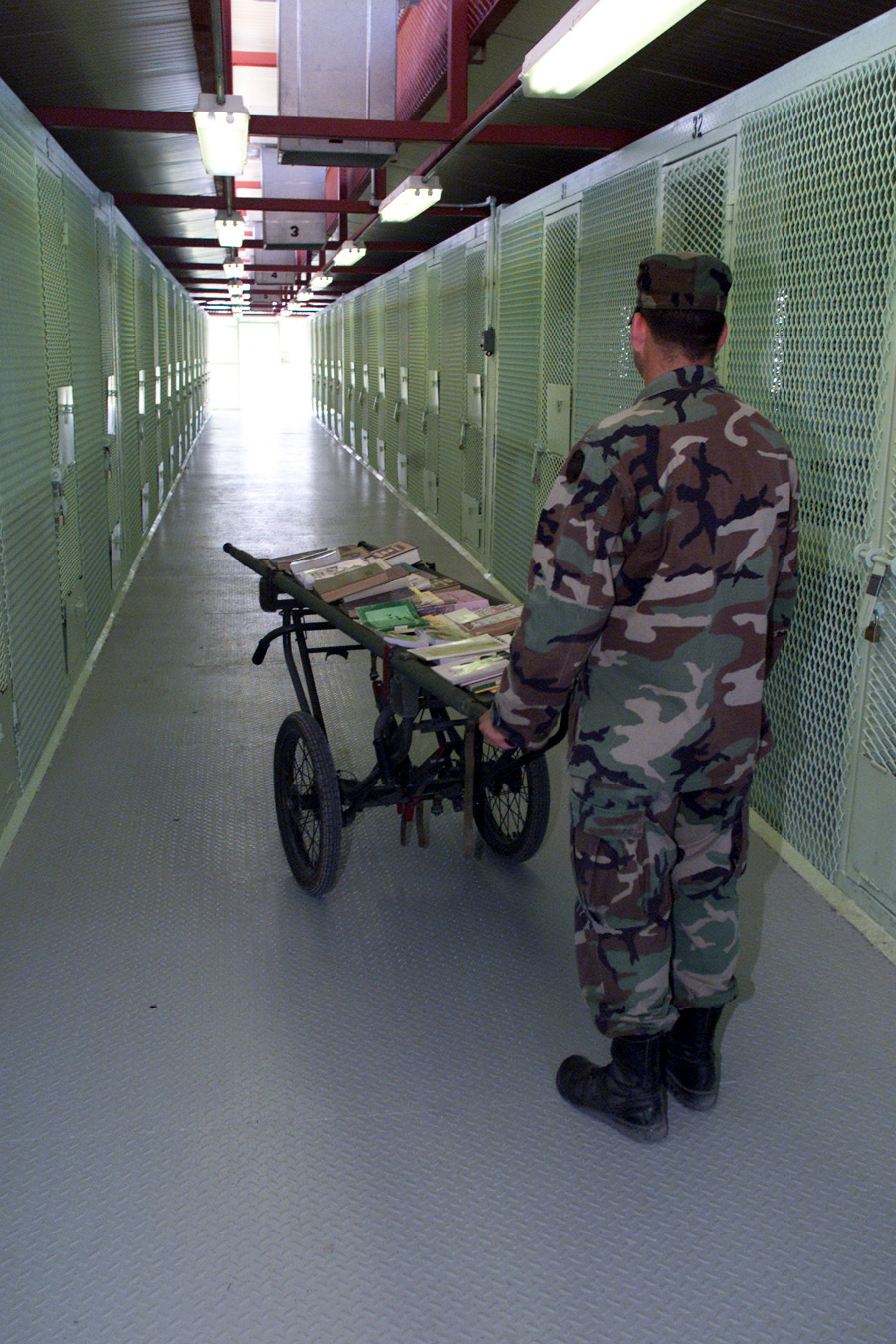
A librarian pushes a book cart at Camp Delta, Guantanamo Bay, Cuba on December 3, 2002

Experienced librarians may take administrative positions such as library or information center director or learning resource officer. Similar to the management of any other organization, they are concerned with the long-term planning of the library, and its relationship with its parent organization (the city or county for a public library, the college/university for an academic library, or the organization served by a special library). In smaller or specialized libraries, librarians typically perform a wide range of the different duties.

Representative examples of librarian responsibilities:

- Researching topics of interest for their constituencies.
- Referring patrons to other community organizations and government offices.
- Suggesting appropriate books ("readers' advisory") for children of different reading levels and recommending novels for recreational reading.
- Reviewing books and journal databases
- Working with other education organisations to establish continual, lifelong learning and further education initiatives
- Facilitating and promoting reading clubs.
- Developing programs for library users of all ages and backgrounds.
- Managing access to electronic information resources.
- Assessing library services and collections in order to best meet library users' needs.
- Building and maintaining collections to respond to changing community needs or demands
- Creating pathfinders
- Writing grants to gain funding for expanded program or collections
- Digitizing collections for online access
- Publishing articles in library science journals
- Answering incoming reference questions via telephone, postal mail, email, fax, and chat
- Delivering arts and cultural activities to local communities
- Initiating and establishing creative digital activities to introduce children to coding, engineering and website building
- Marking promotion and advocacy of library services
- Assisting job seekers and local businesses
- Making and enforcing computer appointments on the public access Internet computers.

=== Librarians and work-related stress ===
As user and community needs change over time, the role of the librarian continues to reflect these changes. Librarians assist and interact with vulnerable or at-risk populations regularly. It is proposed that librarians experience a moderate degree of work-related stress, and is reported that many experience harassment or emotionally challenging situations in their daily work. The public library in particular can often be described as having an emotionally charged atmosphere. There is evidence to suggest that specialized librarians might experience similar conditions. For example, health science librarians report experiencing a mild to moderate amount of secondary traumatic stress that develops from working closely with patients who are experiencing trauma.

== Changing roles of librarians ==
The role of the profession librarian is constantly evolving due to a number of internal and external influences. These factors include:

- Development in information technology, such as the emergence of generative artificial intelligence (e.g., ChatGPT).
- Changing economic and political conditions, such as cutting of essential services and financial support.
- Changing educational and learning environment, such as the expansion of E-learning.
- Changing health and community situations, such as the 2020 COVID-19 pandemic.
- Changing scholarly communication patterns, such as the expansion of open access publishing.

== Workplaces ==
Basic categories of workplace settings for librarians are routinely classified around the world as: public, academic, school, and special. Some librarians will start and operate their own business. They often call themselves information brokers, research specialists, knowledge management, competitive intelligence, or independent information professionals. Below are the basic differences between the types of libraries.

=== Public library ===
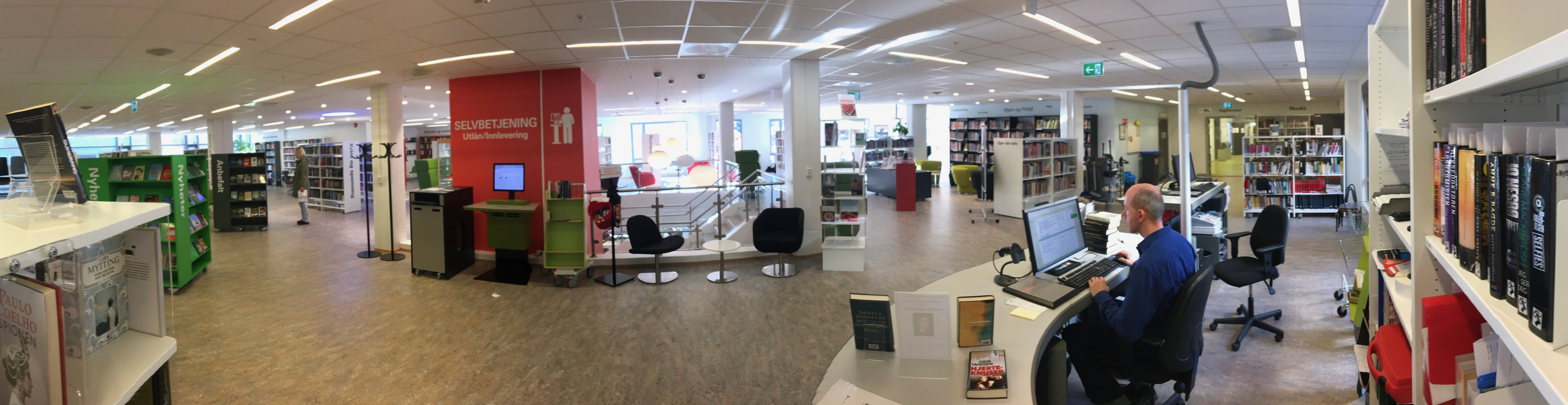
Librarian behind the help desk at the Rana Public Library, Rana, Norway

Public libraries are created through legislation within the jurisdiction they serve. Accordingly, they are given certain benefits, such as taxpayer funding, but must adhere to service standards and meet a wide group of client needs. They are usually overseen by a board of directors or library commission from the community. Mission statements, service and collection policies are the fundamental administrative features of public libraries. Occasionally, private lending libraries serve the public in the manner of public libraries. In the United States, public librarians and public libraries are represented by the Public Library Association. Public library staffing is structured in response to community needs. Libraries bridge traditional divisions between technical and public services positions by adopting new technologies such as mobile library services and reconfigure organizations depending on the local situation.

=== Academic library ===
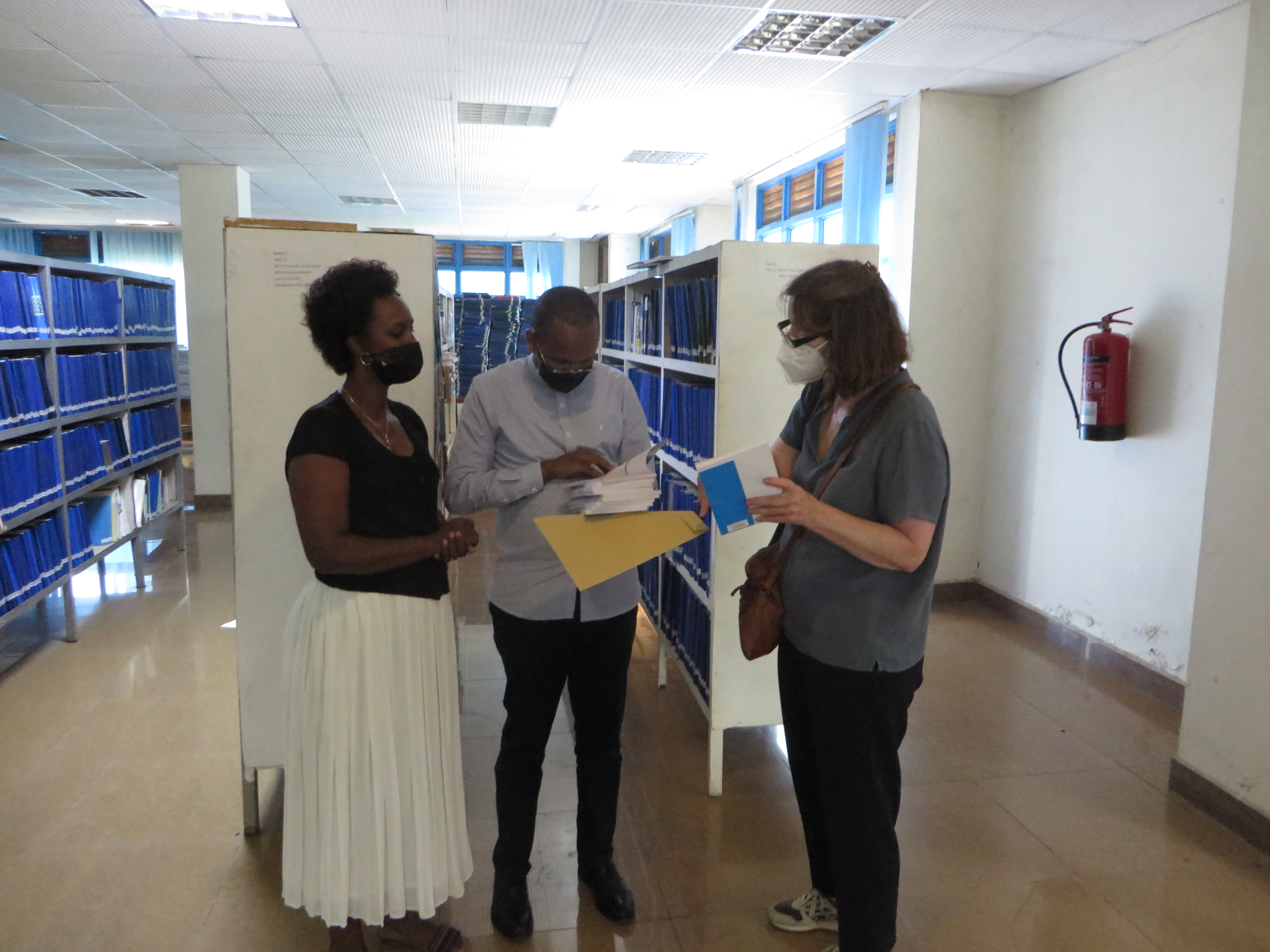
A Dutch librarian with a librarian and researcher at Kigali Independent University, Kigali, Rwanda

An academic library is a library that is an integral part of a college, university, or other institution of postsecondary education, administered to meet the information and research needs of its students, faculty, and staff. In the United States, the professional association for academic libraries and librarians is the Association of College and Research Libraries. Depending upon the institution, the library may serve a particular faculty or the entire institution. Many different types, sizes, and collections are found in academic libraries and some academic librarians are specialists in these collections and archives. A university librarian, or chief librarian, is responsible for the library within the college structure, and may also be called the Dean of Libraries or Director of Libraries. Some post-secondary institutions treat librarians as faculty, and they may be called professor or other academic ranks, which may or may not increase their salary and benefits. Some universities make similar demands of academic librarians for research and professional service as are required of faculty. Academic librarians administer various levels of service and privilege to faculty, students, alumni, and the public.

=== School library ===
A school library exclusively serves the needs of a public or private school. The primary purpose is to support the students, teachers, and curriculum of the school or school district. In addition to library administration, certificated teacher-librarians instruct individual students, groups and classes, and faculty in effective research methods, often referred to as information literacy skills. Audio-visual equipment service and/or textbook circulation may also be included in a school librarian's responsibilities. Often, teacher-librarians are qualified teachers who take academic courses for school library certification or earn a master's degree in Library Science.

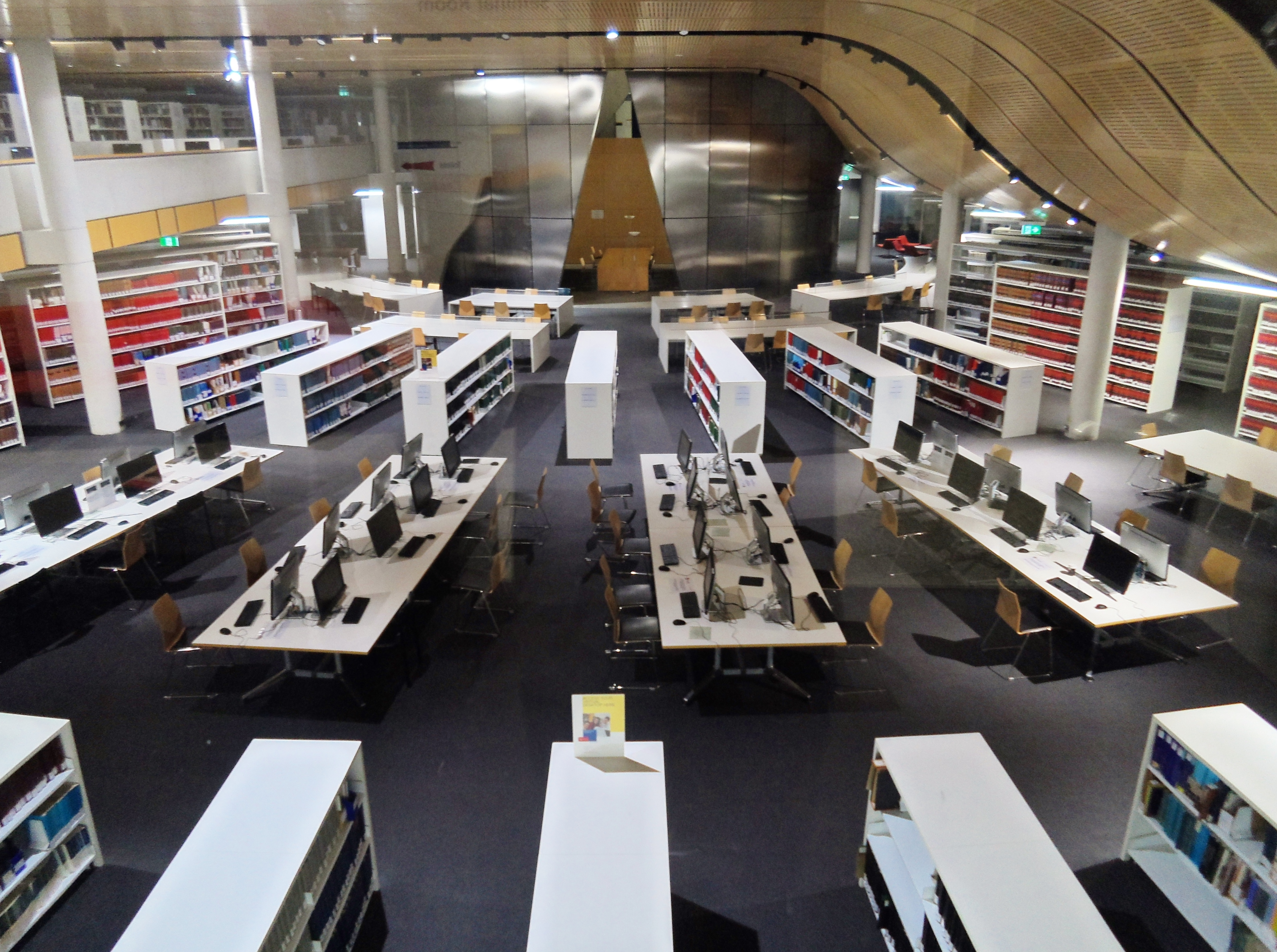
Law library at the University of Sydney

=== Special library ===
Special libraries are libraries designed to perform some specific function for a particular set of people or an organization, i.e. news, law, medical, theological, prison, corporate, or museum. They can be highly specialized, serving a discrete user group with a restricted collection area. In an increasingly global and virtual workplace, many special librarians may not even work in a library at all but instead manage and facilitate the use of electronic collections. Funding for special libraries varies widely. Librarians in some types of special libraries may be required to have additional training, such as a law degree for a librarian in an academic law library or appropriate subject degrees for subject specialties such as chemistry, engineering, etc. Many belong to the Special Libraries Association. There are also more specific associations such as the American Association of Law Libraries, Art Libraries Society of North America, the Association for Information Science and Technology, the American Theological Library Association, the Medical Library Association, or the Visual Resources Association.

== Education ==
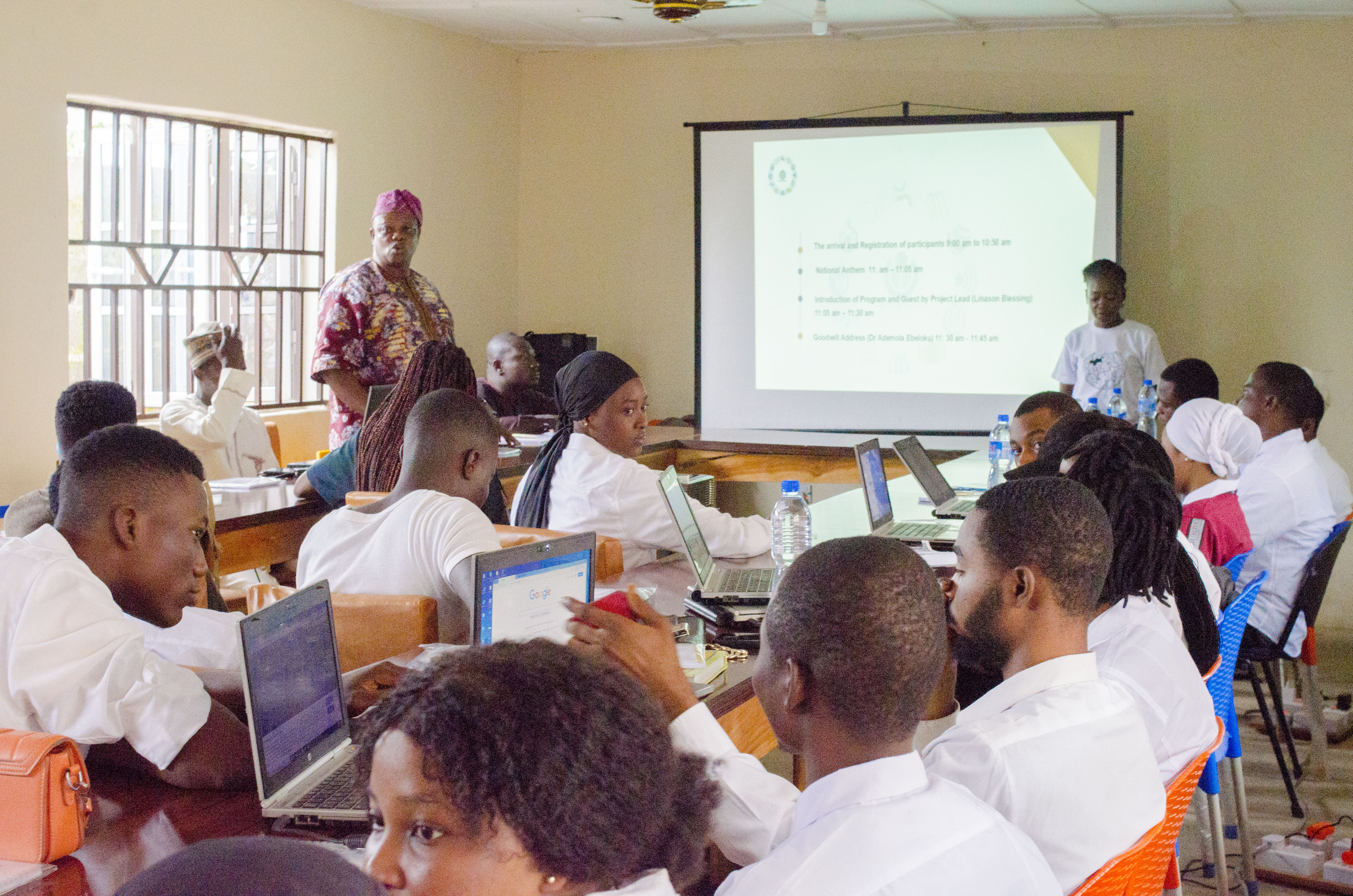
Library and information science students in Nigeria

Librarians generally hold a university degree in library science. It is also possible to earn a doctorate in library science. The first doctoral degree in library science was offered by the Graduate Library School, University of Chicago, 1928-1989. Graduates with PhDs usually become teaching faculty in schools of library and information science, or sometimes occupy the directorship or deanship of university libraries. Those undertaking research at the doctoral level can pursue a very wide range of interests including information technology, government information policy, social research into information use among particular segments of society, information in organizations and corporate settings, and the history of books and printing.

It is common in academic and other research libraries to require the librarians to obtain master's degrees in some academic subject, sometimes but not necessarily related to their professional responsibilities; in major research libraries, some of the librarians will hold PhD degrees in subject fields. Other advanced degrees often taken in conjunction with a degree in librarianship are law, management, health administration, or public administration. Despite the existence of doctoral programs existing to supplement a master's degree, the American Library Association considers a master's degree from an ALA accredited or approved program to be the terminal degree in the field.

Library technicians, library assistants, and library associates (not to be confused with academic rank of assistant librarian or associate librarian) may have diplomas but usually do not hold library-related degrees. Occasionally they also hold undergraduate or graduate degrees in other disciplines. These workers, sometimes referred to as para-professionals, perform duties such as database management, library cataloging, ready reference, and serials and monograph processing.

=== Europe ===
In the United Kingdom, a librarian can have a three- or four-year bachelor's degree in library science; separate master's degrees in librarianship, archive management, and records management are also available. These degrees are accredited by the Chartered Institute of Library and Information Professionals and the Society of Archivists.

In Germany, the first step for an academic librarian is a PhD in a subject field, followed by additional training in librarianship.

=== North America ===
Logo of the American Library Association, which covers librarians in the United States, and Canada

In the United States and Canada, a librarian generally has a one or two-year (more common) master's degree in library science from an accredited university. This master's degree is obtained following graduation from a bachelor's degree program in any discipline. The Master of Library and Information Science (MLIS) degree is accredited by the American Library Association and can have specializations within fields such as archival studies, records management, information architecture, public librarianship, medical librarianship, law librarianship, special librarianship, academic librarianship, or school (K-12) librarianship. School librarians often are required to have a teaching credential; however, an additional library science degree is not generally required. Many, if not most, academic librarians also have a second, subject-based master's degree. This is especially true of librarians working at four-year colleges. Beta Phi Mu, the international honor society for library & information science and information technology, honors faculty for distinguished service to education for librarianship with the annual Beta Phi Mu Award.

=== Oceania ===
Logo of the Australian Library and Information Association

In Australia, a professional librarian must meet the requirements set out by the Australian Library and Information Association (ALIA).

There are three ways in which these requirements can be met: the individual must obtain an ALIA-recognized bachelor's degree in library and information studies, complete a first degree in any discipline followed by an ALIA-recognized postgraduate diploma or masters course, or gain an ALIA-recognized library technician qualifications (undertaken at a Technical and Further Education (TAFE) college/institute followed by an ALIA-recognized bachelor's degree in library and information studies.

ALIA is responsible for accreditation of library specific qualifications for both librarians and library technicians. Professional Australian teacher-librarians require slightly different qualifications. In addition to having a degree that meets ALIA's accreditation process, teacher librarians must also hold recognized teaching qualifications.

== Technology ==
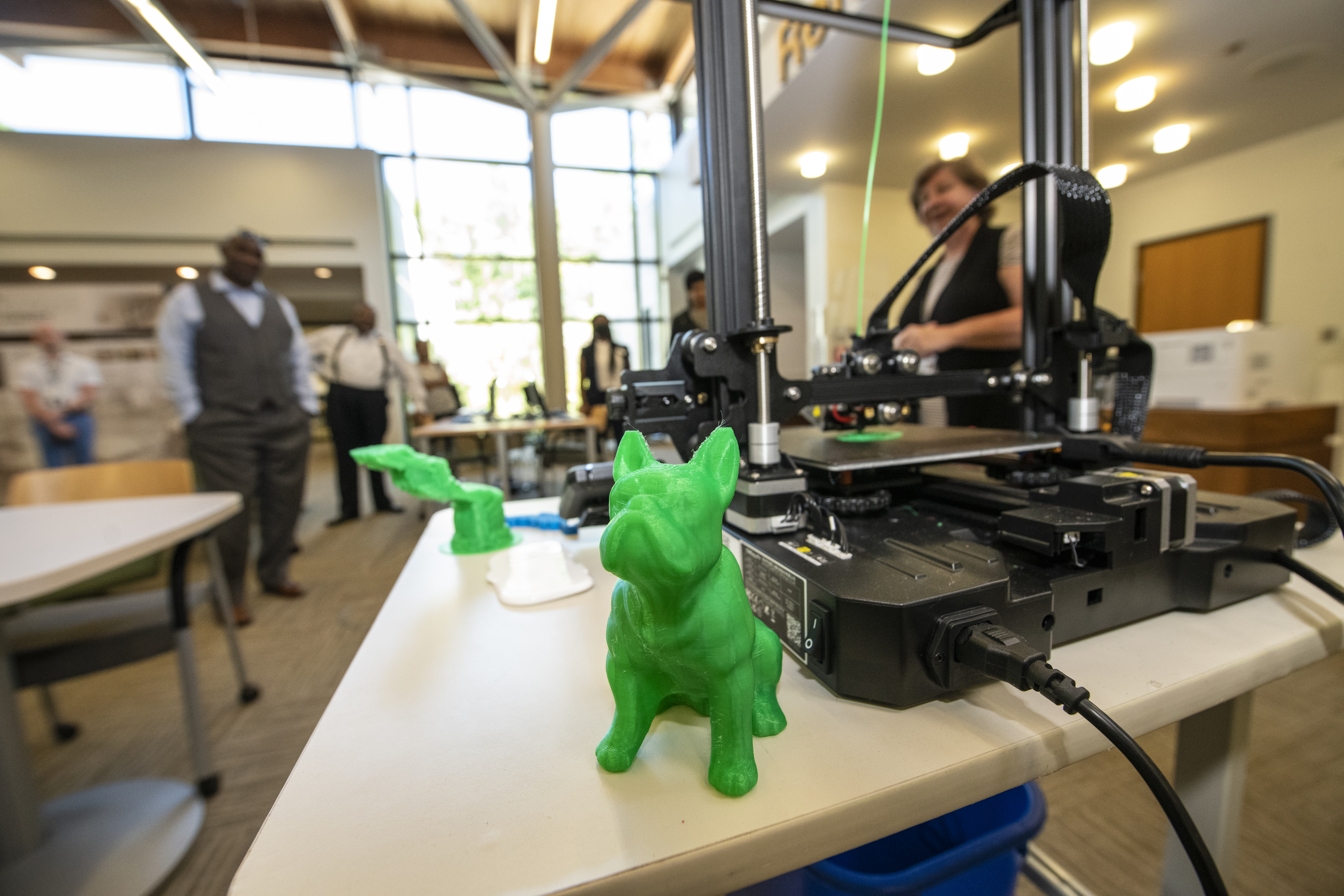
3D printer at a public library in South Carolina

The increasing role of technology in libraries has a significant impact on the changing roles of librarians. New technologies are dramatically increasing the accessibility of information, and librarians are adapting to the evolving needs of users that emerge from the adoption of these new technologies. Digital librarians have become ubiquitous in the Information Age, so much so that a new word has been coined for such digital curators: "cybrarian", which is a blend of the prefix "cyber-" (used to denote digital technology) and "librarian". The term "cybrarian" can be applied to someone who concerns themselves primarily with the role that technology plays in a traditional library setting. The term is also sometimes used for freelance information consultants.

One of the most significant examples of how technology has changed the role of librarians in the last 50 years has been the move from traditional card catalogs to online public access catalogs (OPACs). Librarians had to develop software and the MARC standards for cataloguing records electronically. They had to purchase and run the computers necessary to use the software. They had to teach the public how to use the new technologies and move to more virtual working environments.

The same could be said of other technology developments, from electronic databases (including the Internet), to logistical functions such as bar codes (or in the near future RFID). Many librarians provide virtual reference services (via web-based chat, instant messaging, text messaging, and e-mail), work in digitizing initiatives for works in the public domain, teach information literacy and technology classes to their users, and work on the development of information architectures for improving access and search functionality. These examples illustrate some of the ways in which librarians are using technology to fulfill and expand upon their historical roles.

Librarians must continually adapt to new formats for information, such as electronic journals and e-books, which present both challenges and opportunities in providing access and promoting them to library patrons.

Increasing technological advance has presented the possibility of automating some aspects of traditional libraries. In 2004 a group of researchers in Spain developed the UJI Online Robot. This robot is able to navigate the library, look for the specified book, and upon its discovery, carefully take it from the shelf and deliver it to the user. Because of the robot's extremely limited function, its introduction into libraries poses little risk of the employment of librarians, whose duties are not defined by menial tasks such as the retrieval of books. Recently over 100 libraries in the United States have begun adding 3D printers to their collections in an effort to expose the public to cutting-edge technology.

== Professional organizations ==
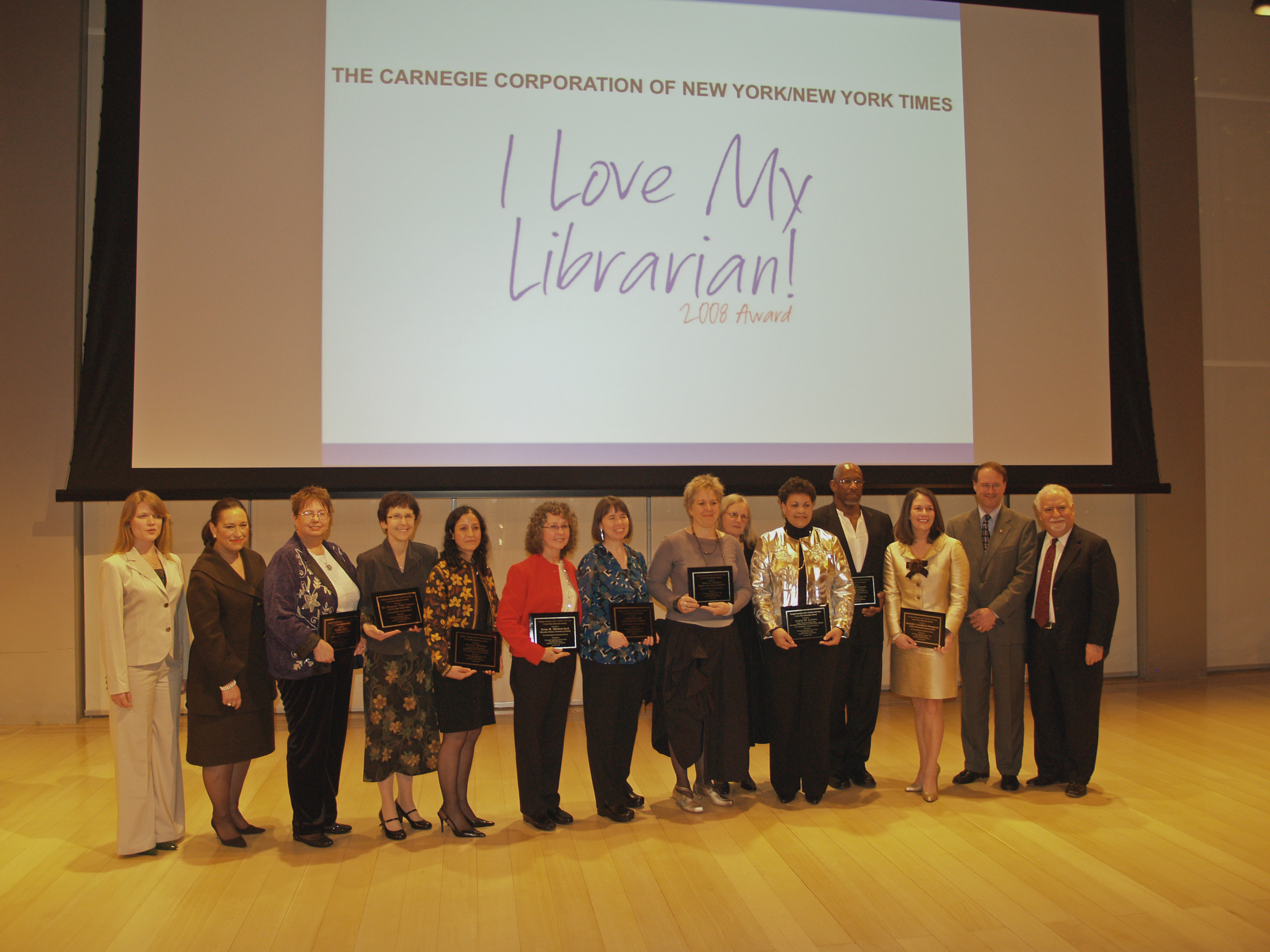
Presenters and recipients of the New York Times-Carnegie Corporation of New York I Love My Librarian awards, presented in association with the American Library Association

=== United States ===
The two largest library associations in the United States are the American Library Association (ALA) and the Special Libraries Association. YALSA, The Young Adult Library Services Association, serves Young Adult librarians, and is part of the American Library Association. Many U.S. states have their own library association as well. Librarians may also join such organizations as the Association of College and Research Libraries and the Public Library Association and the Art Libraries Society of North America. The Canadian Library Association serves Canada and there are provincial associations as well, such as the Ontario Library Association. In the United Kingdom, the professional body for Librarians is the Chartered Institute of Library and Information Professionals (formerly known as the Library Association). The International Federation of Library Associations and Institutions (IFLA) represents the interests of libraries and librarians internationally. (See also the List of Library Associations.) IFLA hosts the annual IFLA World Library and Information Congress.

Recent issues of concern for U.S. libraries include implementation of the Patriot Act and the Children's Internet Protection Act. Many librarians around the world share American librarians' concern over ethical issues surrounding censorship and privacy.

Some librarians join activist organizations like the UK-based Information for Social Change and the North American-based Progressive Librarians Guild. The Progressive Librarians Guild covers the actions of union library workers in its journal and blog, Union Library Workers.

Within the American Library Association (ALA), some also join the Social Responsibilities Round Table (SRRT). SRRT came into being amid the social ferment of the 1960s and is often critical of the American Library Association for not living up to its professed ideals. Another important activist organization is the Social Responsibilities Special Interest Section of the American Association of Law Libraries (AALL). These activist organizations are viewed as controversial by some librarians, while others view them as a natural extension and outgrowth of their own deeply held library ethics. Librarians in the United States who as political actors in our times provide examples of a commitment to equality, the right to know or social justice include Peter Chase, George Christian, Janet Nocek, and Barbara Bailey. In the Doe v. Gonzales case, these librarians challenged the constitutionality of the nondisclosure provisions of the National Security Letters issued by the government under the USA Patriot Act in terrorist or other investigations. The four received the Roger Baldwin Medal of Liberty from the American Civil Liberties Union in June 2007.

== Gender and librarianship ==
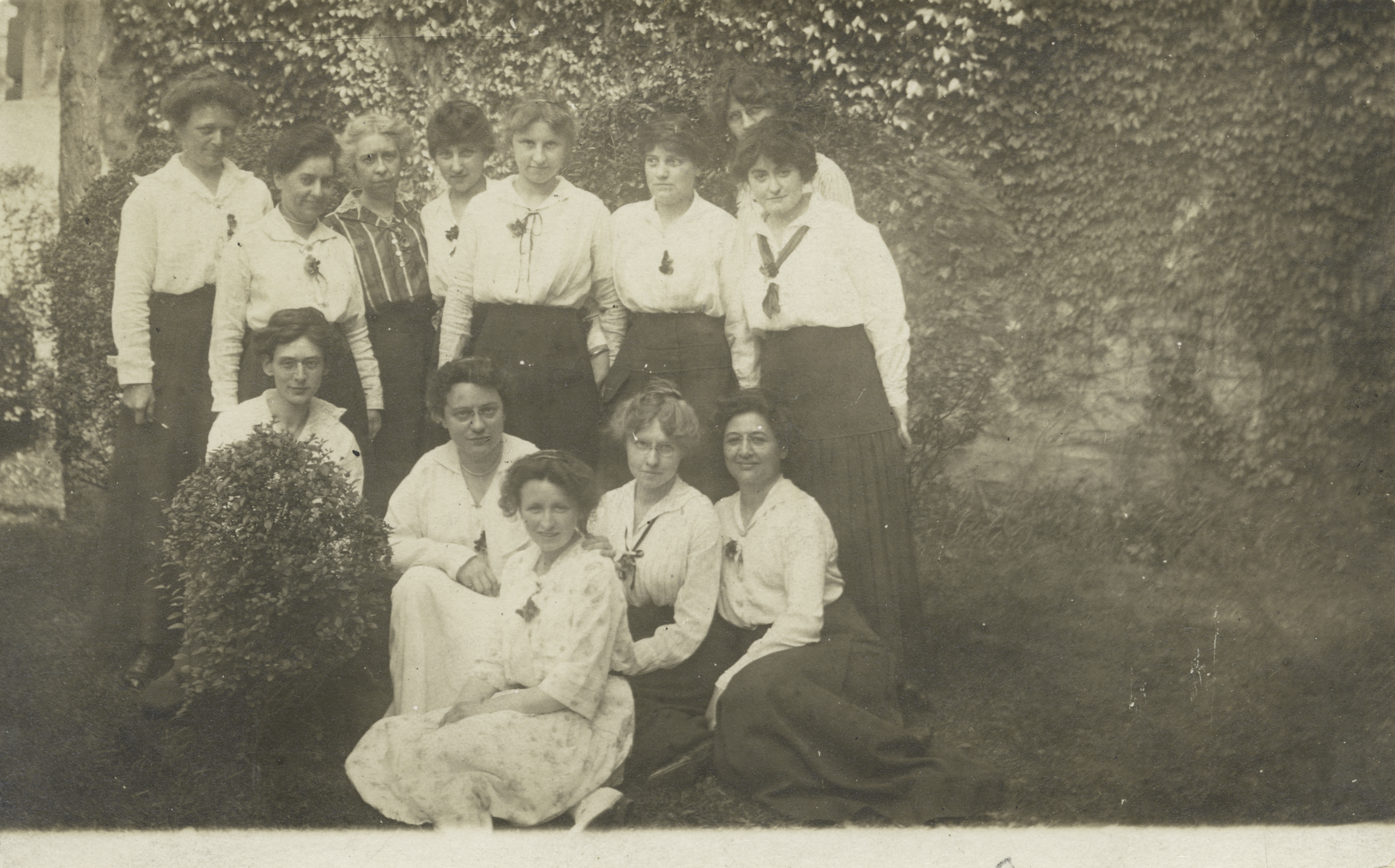
Librarians in Bronx, New York

=== United States ===
Historically, librarianship has offered differing career opportunities for men and women in the United States, where 83 percent of all librarians were women in 2015. That number had fallen to 79 percent in 2018, before going back up to 81 percent in 2019.

Despite women making up most of the workforce, in 2014, women working as full-time librarians reported a median annual salary of $48,589, compared to $52,528 for men. In 2019 the wage gap was still 92 percent of the median annual earnings reported by men. African American women earned just 69.9 cents and Hispanic and Latina women earned 63.8 cents on every dollar earned by a man of any race. Asian women were the only female racial group to earn more than men of all races, but they still only earned 76.7 cents to the dollar reported by Asian men.

Librarianship grew into a female-dominated sphere in the late 19th century due to the lower value of women's wages in comparison to men's. Since women had greater difficulty finding work than men, they were more likely to work for lower wages, thus making them more appealing to employers. Women, however, have made continuous progress toward equality, a reform called for following advancements of the American Library Association to amplify female representation in the library field, as well as reflected by the rise of second-wave feminism.

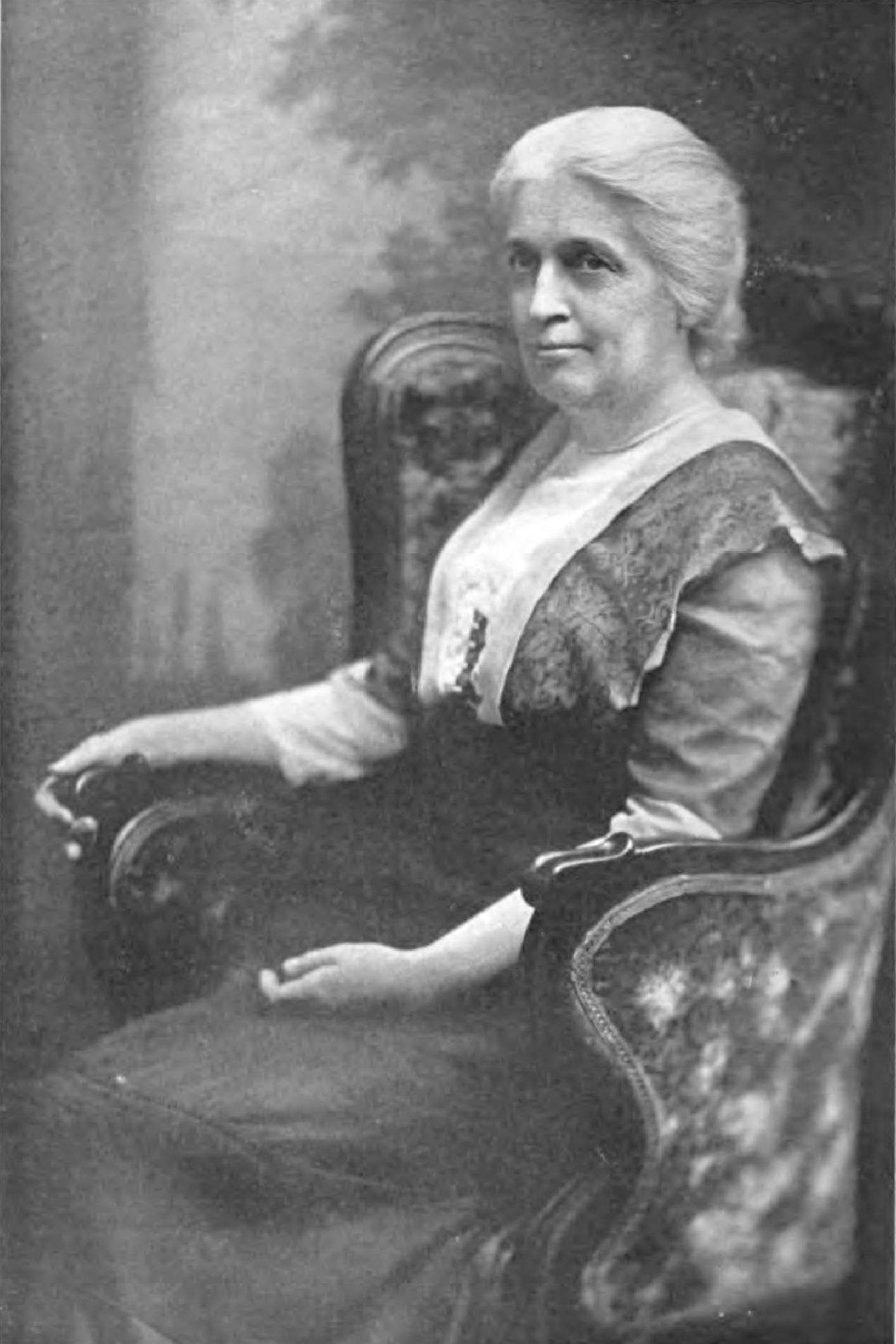
Theresa Elmendorf

Historically, top positions in the library field have largely been held by men. In 1911, Theresa Elmendorf became the first woman elected president of the American Library Association (which had been founded in 1876), serving in that office for just over a year. The highly esteemed position of Librarian of Congress was held entirely by men from its creation in 1802 (two years after the establishment of the Library of Congress) until 2016, when Dr. Carla Hayden was nominated for the position by President Barack Obama. She was confirmed by Congress in July, and assumed office as the 14th Librarian of Congress in September 2016.

Owing to the large number of men in greater positions of power within the library field, women have also been largely left out of standard histories of U.S. librarianship, but Suzanne Hildenbrand's scholarly assessment of the work done by women has expanded the historical record. Writers, academics, and journal publications have aimed to develop the scholarship around women in librarianship by shedding light on important female librarians of history, acknowledging and analyzing the viewpoints of specific groups of female and minority librarians, and bringing the pay gaps of the library profession into discussion.

==== American Library Association ====
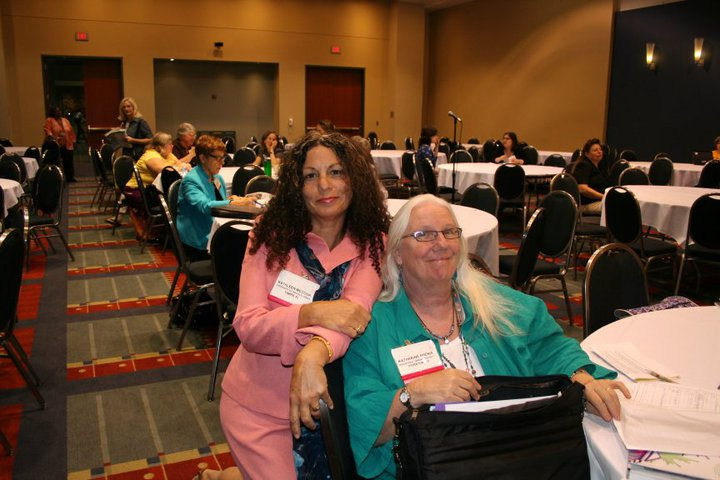
Katharine J. Phenix & Kathleen de la Peña McCook, former chairs of COSWL

The American Library Association's Social Responsibilities Round Table Feminist Task Force (FTF) was founded in 1970 by women who wished to address sexism in libraries and librarianship. FTF was the first ALA group to focus on women's issues.

The Committee on the Status of Women in Librarianship (COSWL) of the American Library Association, founded in 1976, represents the diversity of women's interest within ALA and ensures that the Association considers the rights of the majority (women) in the library field, and promotes and initiates the collection, analysis, dissemination, and coordination of information on the status of women in librarianship. The bibliographic history of women in U.S. librarianship and women librarians developing services for women has been well-documented in the series of publications initially issued by the Social Responsibilities Round Table Task Force on Women and later continued by COSWL.

The Reference and Adult Services Division of the ALA has a discussion group titled "Women's Materials and Women Library Users," formed in the mid-1980s.

The Library Leadership and Management Association Division of the ALA has a discussion group titled "LLAMA Women Administrators Discussion Group," which exists to provide a forum for discussion of problems of particular concern to women in administrative positions.

The ALA also has the Women & Gender Studies Section (WGSS) of its Division "Association of College & Research Libraries"; this section was formed to discuss, promote, and support women's studies collections and services in academic and research libraries.

The ALA Policy Manual states under B.2.1.15 Access to Library Resources and Services Regardless of Sex, Gender Identity, Gender Expression, or Sexual Orientation (Old Number 53.1.15): "The American Library Association stringently and unequivocally maintains that libraries and librarians have an obligation to resist efforts that systematically exclude materials dealing with any subject matter, including sex, gender identity or expression, or sexual orientation. The Association also encourages librarians to proactively support the First Amendment rights of all library users, regardless of sex, sexual orientation, or gender identity or expression. Adopted 1993, amended 2000, 2004, 2008, 2010."

It also states, under B.2.12 Threats to Library Materials Related to Sex, Gender Identity, or Sexual Orientation(Old Number 53.12), "The American Library Association supports the inclusion in library collections of materials that reflect the diversity of our society, including those related to sex, sexual orientation, and gender identity or expression. ALA encourages all American Library Association chapters to take active stands against all legislative or other government attempts to proscribe materials related to sex, sexual orientation, and gender identity or expression; and encourages all libraries to acquire and make available materials representative of all the people in our society. Adopted 2005, Amended 2009, 2010."

== Popular culture ==
Stereotypes of librarians in popular culture are frequently negative: librarians are portrayed as puritanical, punitive, unattractive, and timid if female, or timid, unattractive, and effeminate if male. These stereotypes have harmed librarians in the public eye.

== Librarianship for Deaf communities ==
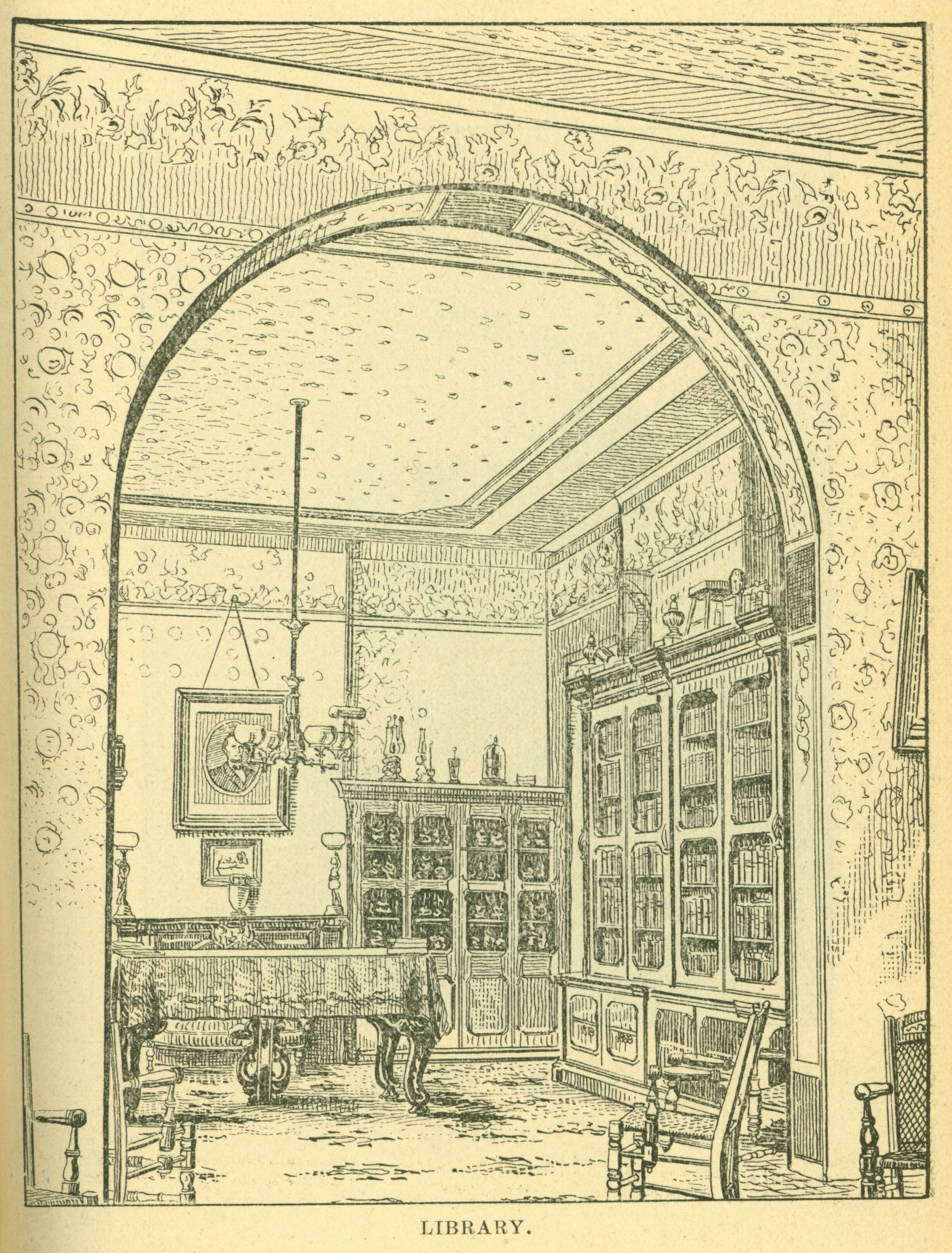
Early library for the deaf in Columbus, Ohio

Deaf people at the library have the same needs as every other person visiting the library and often have more difficulty accessing materials and services. Australian librarian Karen McQuigg states that "even ten years ago, when I was involved in a project looking at what public libraries could offer the deaf, it seemed as if the gap between the requirements of this group and what public libraries could offer was too great for public libraries to be able to serve them effectively."

=== United States ===
The ALA has admitted that disabled people belong to a minority that is often overlooked and under-represented by people in the library, and the Deaf community belongs in this minority group. However, in the last few decades, libraries across the United States have made great strides in the mission of making libraries more accessible to disabilities in general and to the Deaf community specifically.

One of the first activists in the library community working toward accessibility for the Deaf was Alice Hagemeyer. When disabled communities began demanding equality in the 1970s, Hagemeyer decided to go back to school for her master's degree in library science. While she was studying there, she realized that there was not very much information about the Deaf community at her library or at the libraries of any of her classmates. She soon became an activist for Deaf awareness at her library, and she became the first "Librarian for the Deaf Community" from any public library in the nation. Hagemeyer also constructed a manual of resources for Deaf people and those associated with them called The Red Notebook, which is now online at the website of the Friends of Libraries for Deaf Action. Hagemeyer was one of the first library activists to make strides for the Deaf community.

New guidelines from library organizations such as International Federation of Library Associations and Institutions (IFLA) and the ALA were written in order to help libraries make their information more accessible to people with disabilities, and in some cases, specifically the Deaf community. IFLA's Guidelines for Library Services to Deaf People is one such set of guidelines, and it was published to inform libraries of the services that should be provided for Deaf patrons. Most of the guidelines pertain to ensuring that Deaf patrons have equal access to all available library services. Other guidelines include training library staff to provide services for the Deaf community, availability of text telephones or TTYs not only to assist patrons with reference questions but also for making outside calls, using the most recent technology in order to communicate more effectively with Deaf patrons, including closed captioning services for any television services, and developing a collection that would interest the members of the Deaf community.

Over the years, library services have begun to evolve in order to accommodate the needs and desires of local Deaf communities. At the Queen Borough Public Library (QBPL) in New York, the staff implemented new and innovative ideas in order to involve the community and library staff with the Deaf people in their community. The QBPL hired a deaf librarian, Lori Stambler-Dunsmore, to train the library staff about Deaf culture, to teach sign language classes for family members and people who are involved with deaf people, and to teach literacy classes for Deaf patrons. In working with the library, Stambler-Dunsmore was able to help the community reach out to its deaf neighbors, and helped other deaf people become more active in their outside community.

=== Deaf libraries ===
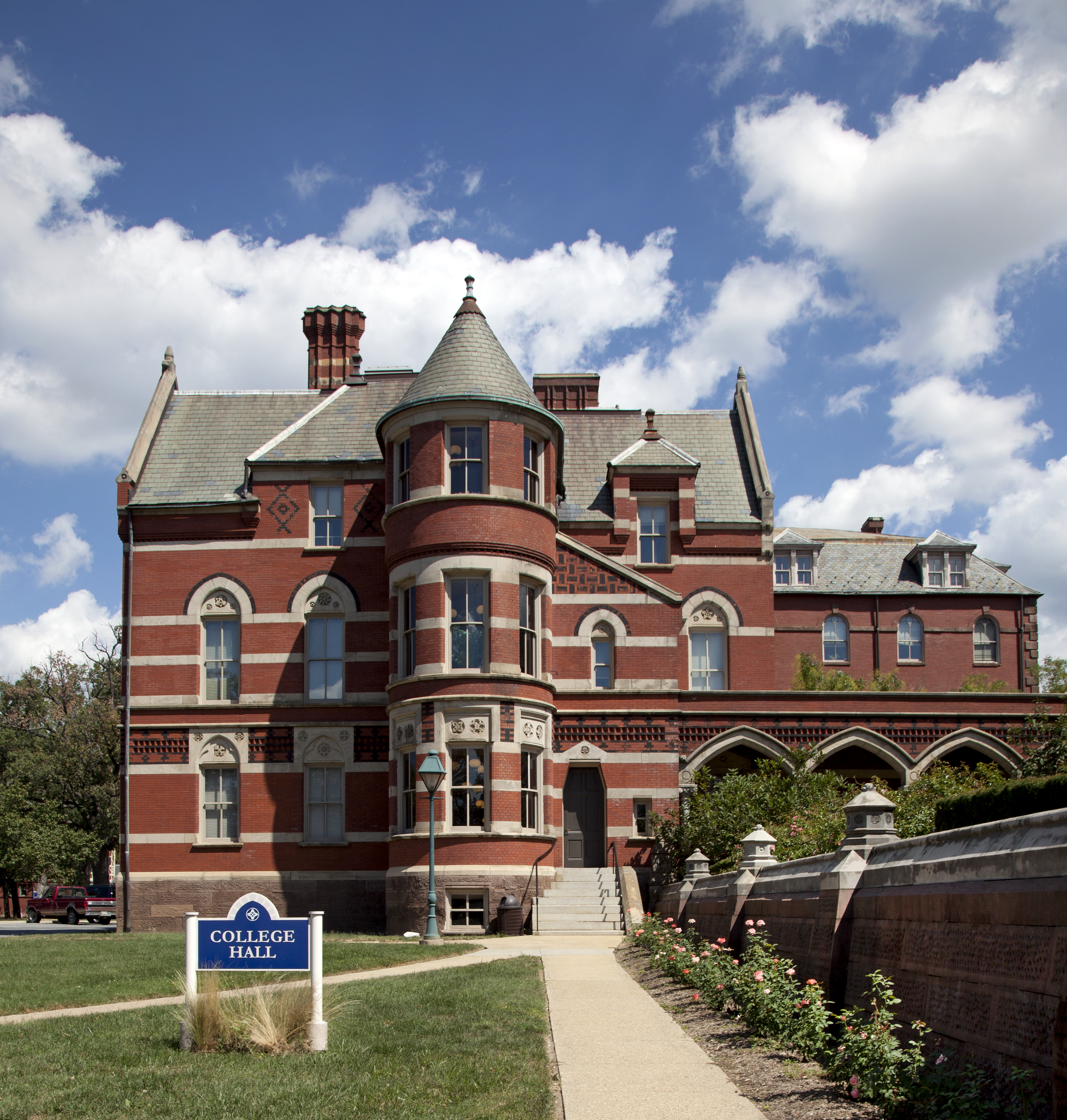
College Hall, Gallaudet University

The library at Gallaudet University, the only Deaf liberal arts university in the United States, was founded in 1876. The library's collection has grown from a small number of reference books to the world's largest collection of deaf-related materials with over 234,000 books and thousands of other materials in different formats. The collection is so large that the library had to create a hybrid classification system based on the Dewey Decimal Classification System in order to make cataloging and location within the library much easier for both library staff and users. The library also houses the university's archives, which holds some of the oldest deaf-related books and documents in the world.

In Nashville, Tennessee, Sandy Cohen manages the Library Services for the Deaf and Hard of Hearing (LSDHH). The program was created in 1979 in response to information accessibility issues for the Deaf in the Nashville area. Originally, the only service provided was the news via a teletypewriter or TTY, but today, the program has expanded to serving the entire state of Tennessee by providing all different types of information and material on deafness, Deaf culture, and information for family members of Deaf people, as well as a historical and reference collection.

== See also ==
- List of librarians
- List of female librarians
- Archivist
- Bookselling
- Curator
- History of public library advocacy
- Information professional
- Library Bill of Rights
- Librarians in North America
- American librarianship and human rights
- Libraries and the LGBTQ community
- Library school
- Library technician
- Periodicals librarian
- Public library advocacy
