= Carl Young =

Carl Young may refer to:

- Karl Gustav Jung (1795–1864), Swiss-German medical doctor and political activist
- Carl Jung (1875–1961), Swiss psychiatrist and psychologist, founder of analytical psychology
- Carl Young (storm chaser) (1968–2013), American meteorologist and storm chaser
