= Library technician =

A library technician or library assistant (or at higher levels, a library associate or library manager) is a library and information professional in charge of the day-to-day functions of a library, working alongside or under the supervision of librarians, and assisting libraries in the acquisition, preparation, and organization of information. They also assist patrons in finding information. The widespread use of computerized information storage and retrieval systems has resulted in library technicians assisting in the handling of technical services (such as cataloguing). Especially in small libraries, a library technician may be the only person (or one of a few) staffing the library. In larger libraries, they may help run certain departments and supervise library clerks, aides, and volunteers. Because libraries are increasingly using new technologies (such as automated databases, CD-ROM, the Internet, and virtual libraries), the role of the library technician is expanding and evolving accordingly.

== Qualifications ==
Library technicians differ from librarians in terms of education and main duties. In the United States, library technicians typically require a diploma, or, ideally, an associate degree in library technology from a community college or other similar institution, whereas librarians require a master's degree in library science from an accredited university-based graduate school of library and information science. Typically, a librarian will have had an undergraduate baccalaureate degree in either library science or a field in which they wish to specialize, like history, prior to graduate study. However, for varying reasons, not all librarians are trained yet at the graduate level and sometimes technicians or other individuals with enough training must fill the role.

== Tasks ==
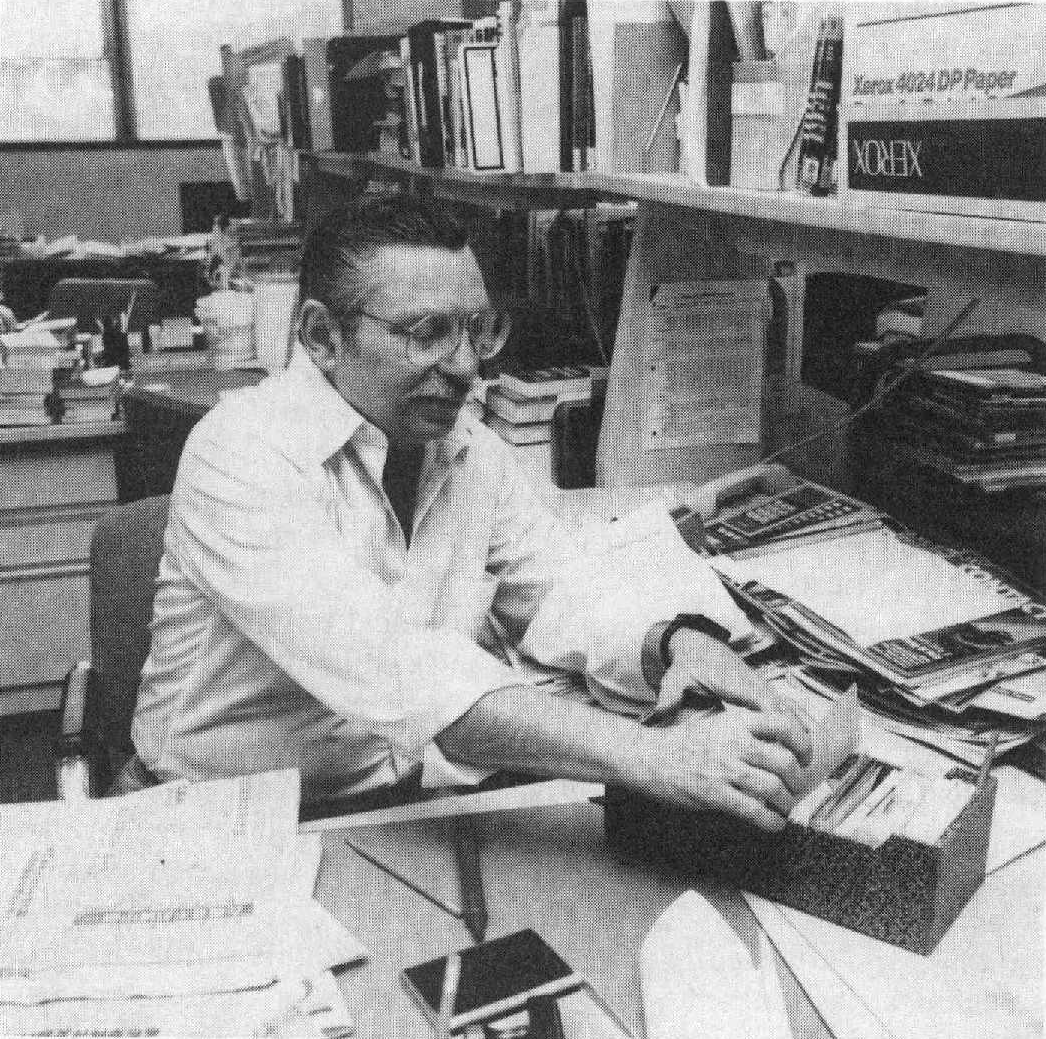
A library technician at work. (1992)

Library technicians will often carry out the practical tasks involved in daily library operation, whereas librarians generally perform the managerial, supervisory and administrative functions. For example, a librarian may be responsible for creating a library's collection development policies, which would include selection criteria for purchasing of items. A library technician would then purchase items based on these criteria. Library technicians may also be graduates of a four-year college, or institute. They can also be holders of a certificate, associate degree, or bachelor's degree. Because the education of the library technician is practical, broad, and skills-based, they are job-ready upon graduation; the only training they require is specific to their particular place of employment. Duties can vary with the type and size of the library but can include: cataloguing and classification of materials, data input to assist in acquiring print and nonprint materials, assisting in the provision of reference services, and circulation procedures. In a larger library in government or academia, senior library technicians with specialized and more extensive training (at the baccalaureate degree level) are often responsible for other technicians, clerical staff, student workers, and volunteers in a certain section or department. In smaller libraries, where the foundations of organization and operation are already established, such paraprofessionals sometimes serve as the manager or even the sole staff member.

=== Other duties of library technicians ===
- Shelve material returned.
- Shelf read to make sure items are in the correct area.
- Sort items and arrange for later use.
- Pull materials from stacks.
- Register new patrons and update patron information.
- Renew patron loans.
- Inspect equipment and materials for damage upon return.
- Route interlibrary loan materials as needed.
- Make sure item requests are properly entered into the circulation system.
- Keep availability of reserve items.
- Prepare overdue notice reports for administration.
- Deliver incoming mail.
- Answer and route incoming phone calls.
- Maintain photocopy and computer equipment.
- Perform physical maintenance of premises.

== Library associate or library manager ==
A senior library technician who regularly supervises junior library assistants or other staff, or serves as library manager, while working alongside or under the supervision of librarian, and has advanced training, is known as a library associate or library manager. In the United States, the average salary for an experienced library technician (with an associate degree or bachelor's degree and three to five years of experience) was around $41,000 per year in 2017 in a well-paying district; experienced technicians who serve as supervisors or library associates/managers and/or have a baccalaureate degree can earn slightly more.

Using the latest information technologies, the goal of library technicians is to bring together people, information, and materials and meet the challenges of a changing information environment. Library technicians work in corporations, firms, financial institutions, cultural institutions, public libraries, and schools.

== See also ==
- Archivist
- Curator
