= Karl Gustav Jung =

German-Swiss medical doctor (1795–1864)

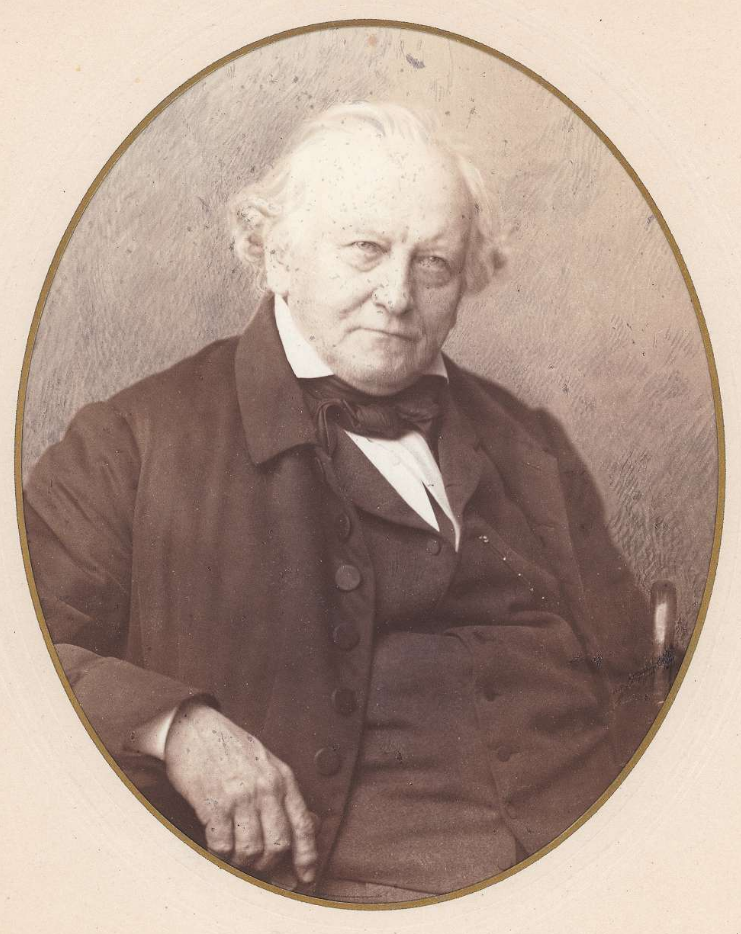
- Professor Karl Gustav Jung
- Born: 7 September 1795; Mannheim, Electoral Palatinate, Holy Roman Empire
- Died: 12 June 1864 (aged 68); Basel, Switzerland
- Resting place: Wolfgottesacker Cemetery, Basel
- Known for: Radical reform of the university medical curriculum
- Spouse(s): Virginie de Lassaulx, Elisabeth Reyenthaler, Sophie Frey
- Children: At least 13
- Relatives: Carl Jung (grandson)
- Awards: Freedom of the city of Basel
- Scientific career
- Fields: Anatomy, Medicine, Surgery, Midwifery, Ophthalmology
- Workplaces: Ruprecht-Karls-Universitaet Heidelberg, Charité, University of Basel

Karl Gustav Jung (7 September 1795 – 12 June 1864) was a German-Swiss medical doctor, political activist, professor of Medicine at the University of Basel, administrator and freemason.

== Life ==
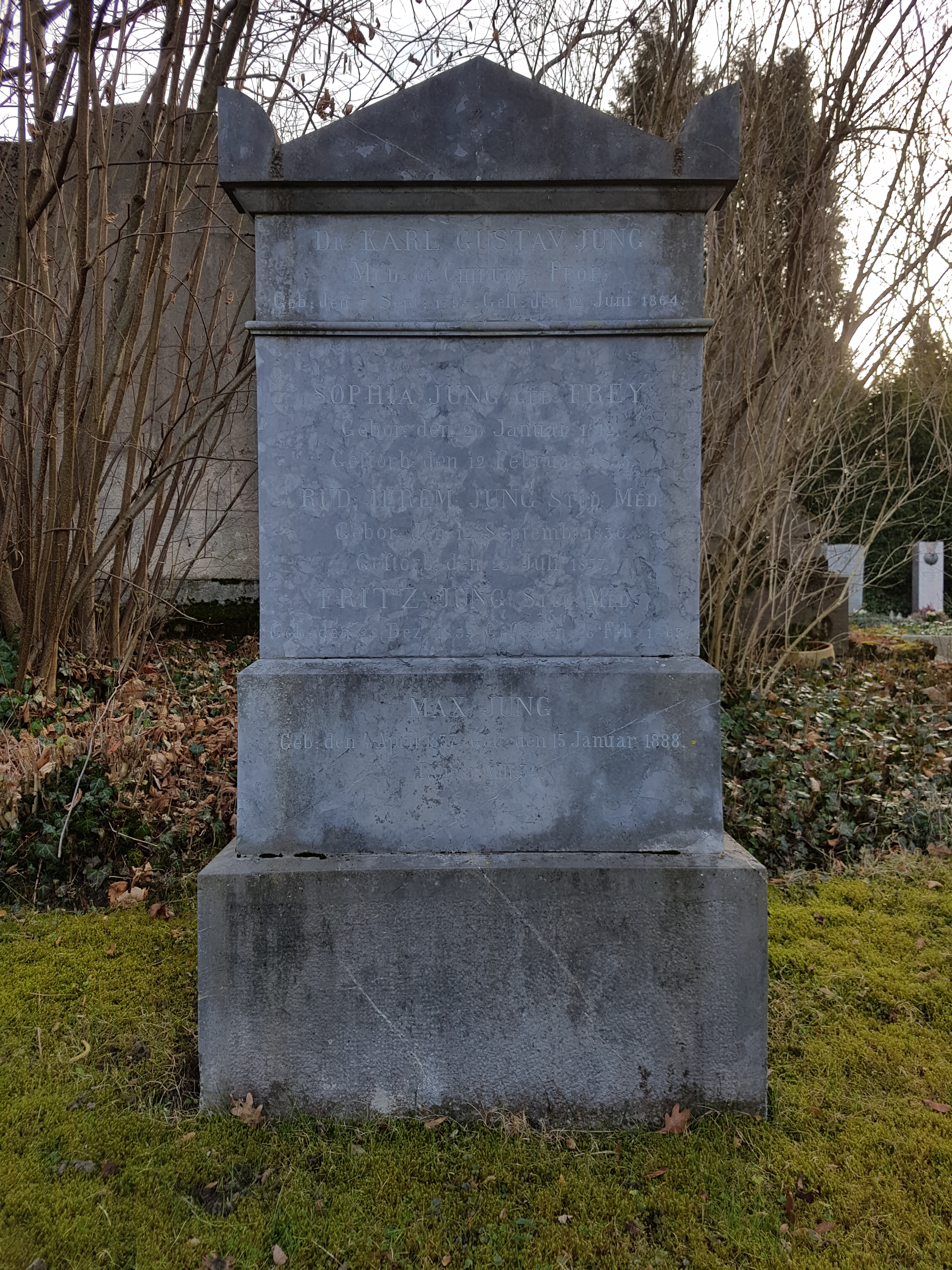
The grave of Karl Gustav Jung in Basel

Karl Gustav Jung was the son of a prosperous medical practitioner from Mainz, involved in the campaign against Napoleon, Franz Ignaz and his wife Sophie Maria Josepha née Ziegler. By the time Jung was born, his family had moved to Mannheim where his father managed a field hospital. Following medical studies, he gained his Science and Medical doctorate summa cum laude at Ruprecht-Karls-Universitaet Heidelberg in 1816, with a dissertation, entitled, De evolutione corporis humani. In 1815, inspired by liberal and nationalistic ideas, he had converted from his family's Catholicism to Protestantism and had joined the ancient Heidelberg Burschenschaft student fraternity, Teutonia. In 1817, he participated in the great student gathering at Jena and then travelled to the original Wartburgfest of 1817 to mark the tercentenary of the Reformation. At this time he began writing, publishing his work mostly anonymously.

As a brilliant young practitioner, he subsequently specialized further in surgery and in ophthalmology as an assistant under Johann Nepomuk Rust at the Charité in Berlin, where he was helped by the publisher, Georg Reimer and befriended by Alexander von Humboldt who later wrote letters recommending him for a professorship in Basel. In 1819 after Karl Ludwig Sand, a friend of Jung's, killed the poet August Kotzebue, all student fraternities were banned and teaching staff with liberal sympathies, arrested. Jung was found to be in possession of an "offensive weapon", a geological hammer, given to him by Sand. He was convicted to thirteen months of detention in the Hansvogtai prison. Upon his release he became unemployable anywhere in the German Confederation due to his perceived political views. He resolved to look for research openings in Paris in 1821 and in 1822 he settled in Basel. He was promoted there to assistant professorships in surgery, anatomy and midwifery. In 1824 he founded the Anatomy Museum in Basel to house the University's collection. In the same year he was granted Swiss citizenship and awarded the Freedom of the City. In 1828 Jung was installed as Rector of the University and set about making sweeping reforms and creating charitable foundations. From 1855 to 1864 he was the first full professor of Internal medicine at the University of Basel.

Between 1850 and 1856 he was Master of the Grand Lodge Alpina.

In 1876 the Swiss sculptor Ferdinand Schlöth made a bust of Karl Gustav Jung for the assembly hall of the Museum an der Augustinergasse. In 2008 the bust was re-installed, along with those of other professors, in the Basel Sculpture Hall.

Karl Gustav Jung married three times and was the father of noted architect, Ernst Georg Jung, and the grandfather of Carl Gustav Jung, psychiatrist and author.

== Goethe myth ==
Jung's grandson, Carl, entertained a fantasy that he might be descended from the German romantic writer, through his great grandmother, Sophie Ziegler, Karl Jung's mother. This would have needed Karl Jung to have been fathered by Goethe and not Franz Ignaz Jung. Although there were arguably affinities between the younger Jung and Goethe, there is no evidence for Karl's illegitimate paternity at all.

== Works ==
- Können in Basel die nöthigsten Hülfsanstalten zur Förderung medizinischer Studien gegründet werden? 1823
- Über das Verhältniss der Anatomie zu der medicinischen Wissenschaft und über die Leistungen der Anatomen an der Baseler Hochschule: Rectoratsrede gehalten den 26. September, 1828
- Die Revolution: Originaldrama in drei Akten von Demius, 1831
- Über die seitliche Erhabenheit in dem Lateral-Ventrikel des menschlichen Gehirnes, 1843
- Über das Gewölbe in dem menschlichen Gehirne, 1845

== Bibliography ==
- Dvorak, Helge. Biographisches Lexikon der Deutschen Burschenschaft. Volume I: Politiker. Volume 3: I–L. Winter, Heidelberg 1999. ISBN 3-8253-0865-0, pp. 36–37. (in German)
