= Librarians in North America =

A librarian is a person who works professionally in a library, and may hold a degree in librarianship (known either as library science or library and information science).

== Duties and functions ==
Traditionally, a librarian is associated with collections of books, as demonstrated by the etymology of the word "librarian" (from the Latin liber, "book"). The role of a librarian is continually evolving to meet social and technological needs. A modern librarian may deal provision and maintenance of information in many formats, including: physical books; electronic resources; magazines; newspapers; audio and video recordings; maps; manuscripts; photographs and other graphic material; bibliographic databases; and web-based and digital resources. A librarian may also provide other information services, including: computer provision and training; coordination with community groups to host public programs; basic literacy education; assistive technology for people with disabilities; and assistance locating community resources. Appreciation for librarians is often included by authors and scholars in the Acknowledgment sections of books.

== History in the United States ==
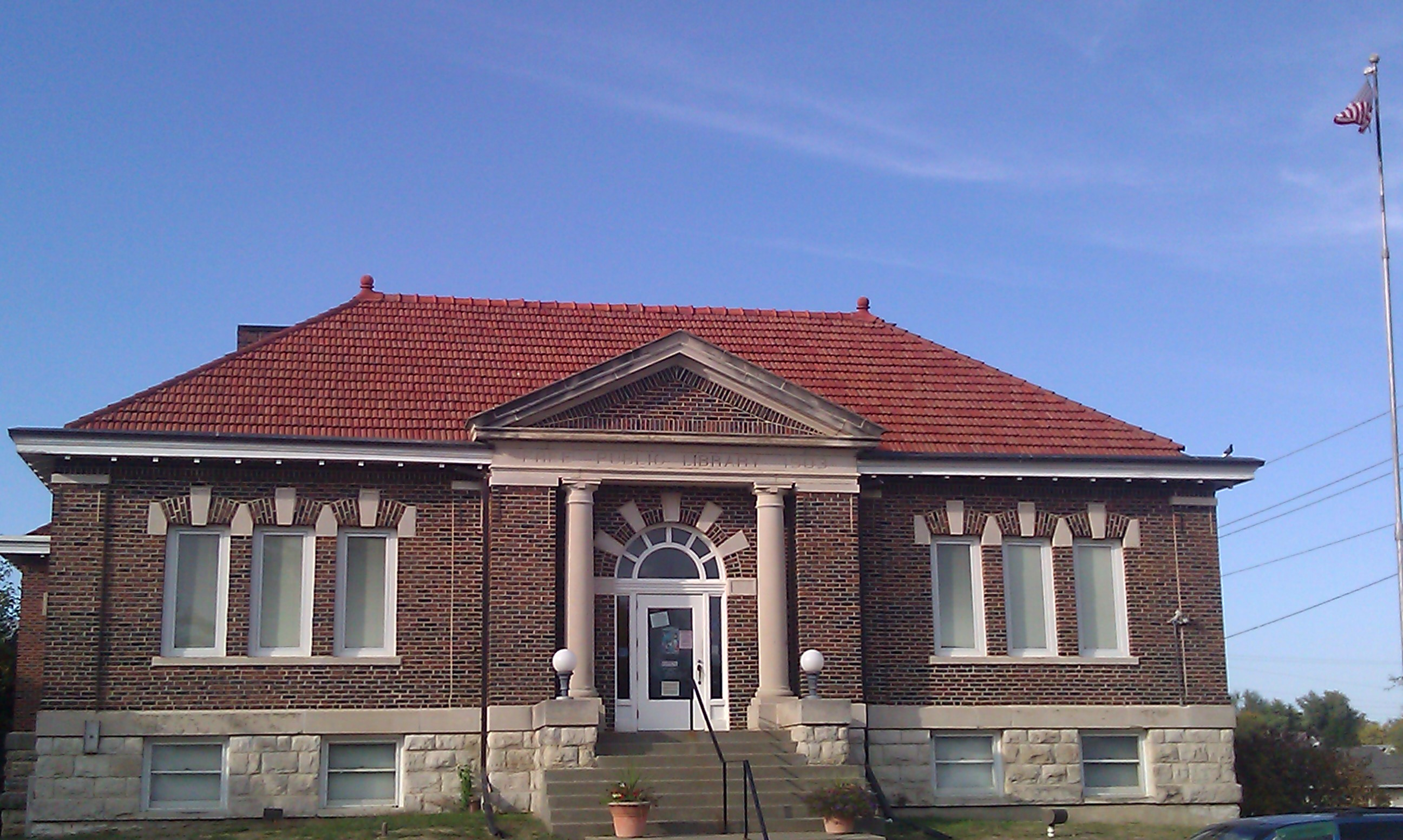
Chariton Free Public Library, a Carnegie Library

In the 19th century, librarianship began to emerge as a true profession. Male librarians (called "bookmen") were found in sophisticated academic institutions around the middle of the 19th century. Like the librarians of Alexandria, these librarians were primarily scholars, not custodians of the library in which they worked. At that time there was no formal training for librarians. Education in the field was gained by experience, either self-taught or under tutelage of other librarians. Experienced librarians quite often recruited trainees. In 1872, Publishers Weekly, an instructional publication focusing on the publishing industry, began to regularly devote small sections to librarians. In 1876, The U.S. Department of the Interior, Bureau of Education published Public Libraries in the United States of America: Their History, Condition, and Management. Aimed at practicing librarians, the study included a manual written by notable authorities on librarianship with articles on management, administration, history, cataloging, popular reading, and library buildings.

Carnegie libraries created an increased need for larger numbers of librarians to manage them, thus career library workers became an established permanent workforce.

During this period, Melvil Dewey became a primary force in the professionalization of librarians and library education in the United States. Dewey believed that librarians are meant to provide patrons with "better" books to improve people and their way of life. In 1876, Dewey, Justin Winsor, Charles Ammi Cutter and other prominent librarians of the day, founded the American Library Association (ALA). The formation of this professional organization provided national visibility and recognition to the field of librarianship, while substantially strengthening the professional identity among the library practitioners. Around this time, Dewey founded the first major professional publication for librarians, Library Journal. Dewey founded the first library school, The School of Library Economy, which opened at Columbia College in 1887. The coursework programs offered by the library school took three months to complete, following which students had to take an internship of up to 2 years to gain exposure to and familiarity with professional tasks.

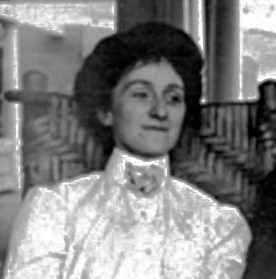
Sarah Byrd Askew (1877–1942) pioneered the establishment of county libraries in the USA.

After Dewey's library school, four more library schools were opened by 1900: Albany, Pratt Institute, Drexel University, and the Armour Institute. By 1919, there were 15 more programs in the United States. These programs varied by length of program, type of degree or certificate awarded, and requirements for admission. On completion of most programs, students became Bachelors of Library Science. At the time, the degree of Master of Library Science was not awarded anywhere but Albany.

In recognition of the rise of Library education programs, ALA created the ALA Committee on Library Training in which members would review the various educational programs. This led to ALA’s "Standards for Library Education", which established separate standards for the different types of training programs. The neutral approach that ALA took to the Library Schools, however, influenced the schools to band together and create their own organization: the Association of American Library Schools. The Williamson Report, created for the Carnegie Corporation, however, was the most important review of library education programs. In the Williamson report, C.C. Williamson criticises the quality of many established programs, and designates a university graduate degree, not a college bachelor's degree, as the appropriate education for professional librarians. The Graduate Library School, University of Chicago, 1928-1989. was founded to respond to this need. It was thanks to the Williamson report that librarians were required to receive one year of postgraduate education in librarianship. By the 1950s most library schools in the US awarded a master's degree.

It was at this point in history that the notion of library science was established as the study for future librarians. In addition to professional librarians, faculty in Library Science programs included other academics such as sociologists and historians. Because the faculty consisted mostly of scholars, they contributed a considerable amount of research which formed the foundation of the field of library science.

Another notable progression that arose after the “Williamson Report” was the establishment of The Hampton Institute Library School, the first library school to train African-American librarians in the US. After the establishment of the Hampton Institute Library School, more African-Americans were accepted to library schools, including Edward Christopher Williams, a graduate of the New York State Library School, who went on to become the director of the library at Howard University in 1916.

With the expanding economy, the baby boom, and the important federal legislation supporting the development of education institutions and their libraries, library schools reached their heyday in the 1950s to 1960s. These factors lead to an increased need for librarians. By the 1970s, there were more than 70 accredited library schools with master’s programs in US and Canada. By 1999, however, there were only 56 ALA-accredited library school programs in the US and Canada. As library schools were never high-profile departments, these closures were a result of universities' efforts to reduce costs during the recessions of the 1980s.

== History in Canada ==
In the earlier half of the 19th century, Canada had no formal training or library schools to educate potential librarians. The Toronto Public Library held competitive examinations for librarian hopefuls. The first exam was held December 15, 1887 and tested candidates on writing, arithmetic, reading, and English Literature. In 1890, an additional qualification for exam graduation was added: candidates were required to be at least 5'3" (160 cm) tall. Successful candidates were referred to American library schools for training, or given the option of serving as apprentices to complete on-the-job training.

The starting push to establish library schools in Canada came from George Locke, chief librarian of the Toronto Public Library from 1908–1937. When Locke started his reign as chief librarian at TPL, training for librarians was still limited to on the job training. He believed, however, that librarians should be formally trained in educational programs like those of the US. He favoured librarians that had a formal educational background in librarianship. In 1909, Locke recruited Winnifred Barnstead, a Canadian graduate of a two-year training course for librarians at Princeton University, to head the cataloguing department. Locke also hired Lillian H. Smith, a Canadian graduate from the training school at the Carnegie Library of Pittsburgh, to head the Children's department. With the help of Barnstead and Smith, Locke began his own training program through the Toronto Public Library.

A contemporary of Locke was Edwin A. Hardy, secretary of the Ontario Library Association from its inception in 1901 to 1925, then as president from 1925–1926. Hardy was vocal in his opinion of formal educational training for librarians, and desperately desired a library school in Canada for fear of losing Canadian librarians trained in the US to the US. He was active in establishing library institutes, one-day regional workshops, through Ontario departments of Education, the first of which was held in Brantford, Ontario in 1907.

These institutes, however, proved insufficient, and there was a formal request for Departments of Education to begin a summer library school. The first of these summer schools ran in 1911; it was a hybrid program modelled after American schools and normal schools which educated teachers in Ontario. This program ran for four weeks in the summer when libraries were able to spare staff for training and eligible candidates were only those already employed in libraries. In 1919, it was extended to be a 3-month program and became the Ontario Library School.

The first formal library education program in Canada was established at McGill University in 1904. The McGill Summer Library School was formally founded under the jurisdiction of the University Library Committee, offering education in library administration. It was one of the first university programs in librarianship anywhere in the world outside the United States. Instrumental in the founding of the School and the establishment of its curriculum, Melvyl Dewey, a good friend and colleague of Charles Gould, University Librarian and a founder of the School, taught at the school during its first year.

Library schools in Canada at this time, however, were unique to those in the US because many were under complete control of the Department of Education. While the Department of Education always provided funding for the library school, librarians were not able to push their own ideas or agenda. A course was established in the Ontario College of Education, located on the University of Toronto campus, to provide an academic and professional complement to the already established technical training of librarians. Barnstead became the first director, but all financial, hiring, and curriculum matters were made by the Dean of the College of Education and the Minister of Education. Graduates of the program did not receive a degree; they received a librarian's certificate from the Minister of Education and a diploma from the University of Toronto.

It was not until the 1930s that the library school became a separate entity from the Department and Ministry of Education. In 1937, the library school at the University of Toronto received ALA accreditation and Canadian students began to receive a professional degree – the Bachelor of Library Science.

== See also ==
- Librarian
