= Information for Social Change =

Librarians' professional association (1980s-)

Information for Social Change (ISC) is an international, volunteer-based association, whose primary mission is to debate and comment on issues of social justice, censorship, freedom and ethics in the library and information field. Information for Social Change can be described as an activist organization of library and information professionals. An important aspect of the mission is for members to debate and challenge dominant paradigms or perspectives in the library and information sector. The scope of Information for Social Change is not, however, limited to the traditional library sector, but encompasses a broad spectrum of issues impacting access to information, information literacy and the wider role of information users in society. Information for Social Change supports conferences and collaborates with a range of literacy activists groups. ISC self-publishes their scholarly journal, ISC journal which is published online. Their webpage is (https://informationforsocialchange.wordpress.com and the international standard serial number for the ISC journal is: 1364-694X (print) | 1756-901X (online). Information for Social Change is part of the Directory of Open Access Journals (DOAJ).

== Notes ==
1364-694X (print) | 1756-901X (online)

This page cited from ISC Web site and ISC Policies.
