= Georg Reimer =

German painter

Georg Friedrich Reimer (17 May 1828 – 17 September 1866) was a German genre painter from the Düsseldorf School.

== Life ==
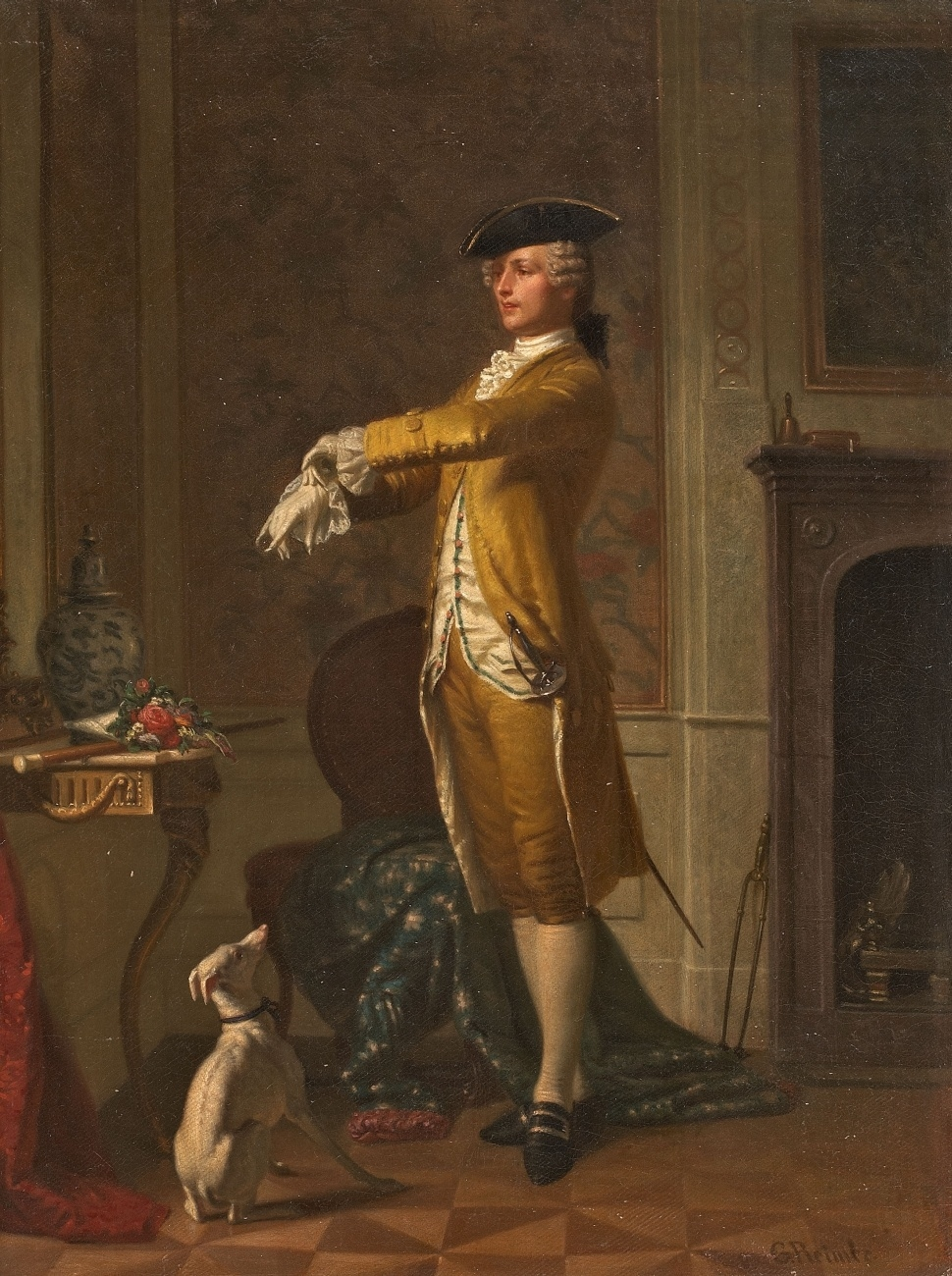
Junger Edelmann mit Hund

Reimer was born on 17 May 1828 in Leipzig. He was the only son of the bookseller Karl August Reimer (1801–1858) from his first marriage to Auguste, née Hörner (1805–1834). His grandfather and namesake was the art-loving Leipzig publisher Georg Andreas Reimer. His sister Maria Auguste (1832–1907) married the historian Theodor Mommsen in 1854.

Reimer grew up in Leipzig. He received artistic training as a painter as a private student of Rudolf Jordan in Düsseldorf, where he lived for a while as a genre painter and draftsman. He then worked in Weimar and Wiesbaden, finally settling in Berlin. His specialty was Kabinettstücke cabinets with galant style scenes from the Rococo period (Neo-Rococo), which were considered witty by contemporary critics.

Reimer died on 17 September 1866 in Berlin. After his death, Reimers stepmother Johanna, née Winter (1817–1902), bequeathed the painting Komplimente to the Alten Nationalgalerie, presumably at the Berlin Academy Vorzimmerszene exhibition in 1860, which inspired Daniel Chodowieckis's etching Der Complimentir-Narr in 1783. Paul Klee also took up the motif in his 1903 etching Zwei Männer, einander in höherer Stellung vermutend, begegnen sich.
