= South African Librarian's Day =

Annual observance in South Africa

South African Librarians' Day
- Official name: South African Librarians' Day
- Also called: SALD
- Type: Observance
- Significance: Celebrates the contributions of librarians and information professionals to literacy, education and equitable access to information
- Date: 10 July
- Frequency: Annual
- Related to: Library and Information Association of South Africa, South African Library Week

South African Librarians' Day is an annual observance held on 10 July to mark the founding of the Library and Information Association of South Africa (LIASA) and to celebrate the vital role that librarians and information professionals play in nation building, literacy and equitable access to information in South Africa.

== History ==
LIASA was formally launched on 10 July 1997 as the professional body uniting all sectors of the library and information services (LIS) profession in South Africa. In 2014, on its 17th anniversary, LIASA declared 10 July as South African Librarians' Day (SALD), setting aside that date each year to honour the profession and its contributions.

Following LIASA's accreditation by the South African Qualifications Authority (SAQA) in February 2015, the inaugural government‑endorsed South African Librarians' Day was marked on 10 July 2015. It emphasised librarians' commitment to the fundamental right of access to information enshrined in the Constitution.

== Purpose and objectives ==
South African Librarians' Day seeks to:

- Raise public awareness of librarianship as a dynamic profession essential to developing an informed nation through equitable access to information.
- Celebrate the value added by librarians as information specialists, knowledge managers, research facilitators and community educators.
- Promote libraries as inclusive community spaces that advance literacy, learning and social cohesion.

== Observance and themes ==
Each year, LIASA selects a theme that reflects current priorities in the sector. Notable recent themes and commemorations include:

- 2022 (25th anniversary): Held on 11 July (10 July fell on a Sunday), the virtual event featured over 220 attendees and presentations on the future of librarianship, including a keynote by Dr Peter Lor outlining LIASA's milestones.
- 2023: Institutional celebrations across university libraries emphasised staff recognition, with the University of Pretoria serving cupcakes to all library staff and partners to acknowledge their service.
- 2024 (30 years of democracy in LIS): The National Library of South Africa (NLSA) and LIASA co‑hosted a panel discussion at the NLSA's Pretoria Campus, featuring reflections by Ellen Tise (LIASA's first president) on sector achievements since 1994.
- 2025: Under the theme "Twelve Languages, One Nation, One Wikipedia", librarian's day was celebrated at the University of South African (UNISA) Main Campus Library. It was meant to celebrate the creation of a community of practice for librarians who edit Wikipedia.
- 2026: Focuses on Artificial Intelligence (AI) and how it affects libraries and how librarians perform their duties.

== Institutional and provincial celebrations ==
Across South Africa, different institutions celebrate librarians yearly through different initiatives that recognise them for their efforts in ensuring literacy, education and their impact on the society. For example, NLSA annually invites stakeholders to attend recognition events, while academic institutions like the University of Pretoria give appreciation gifts to its staff members through annual treats and social media profiles that tell how they were inspired to join the library profession. The LIS of North-West University together with LIASA North-West Branch conducts hybrid workshops, artificial intelligence workshops and "Sip and Paint" workshops. At the regional level, the Northern Cape branch celebrated the achievements in its history and reflections in career by conducting the event at the Africana Research Library in Kimberley, while the City of Cape Town Libraries celebrated the profession through their 268 librarians accounting for 3743 years of collective service. Since 2015, the South African government has recognised SALD as a commemorative event.

SALD not only honours individual and institutional achievements but also highlights ongoing challenges in the LIS sector, such as funding constraints, fragmented governance and legislative reform. It calls on all librarians to reflect on their societal impact and advocate for cohesive, well‑resourced library services.

== See also ==
- Library and Information Association of South Africa
- South African Library Week
- Access to Information Act (South Africa)
