= Sharon Memis =

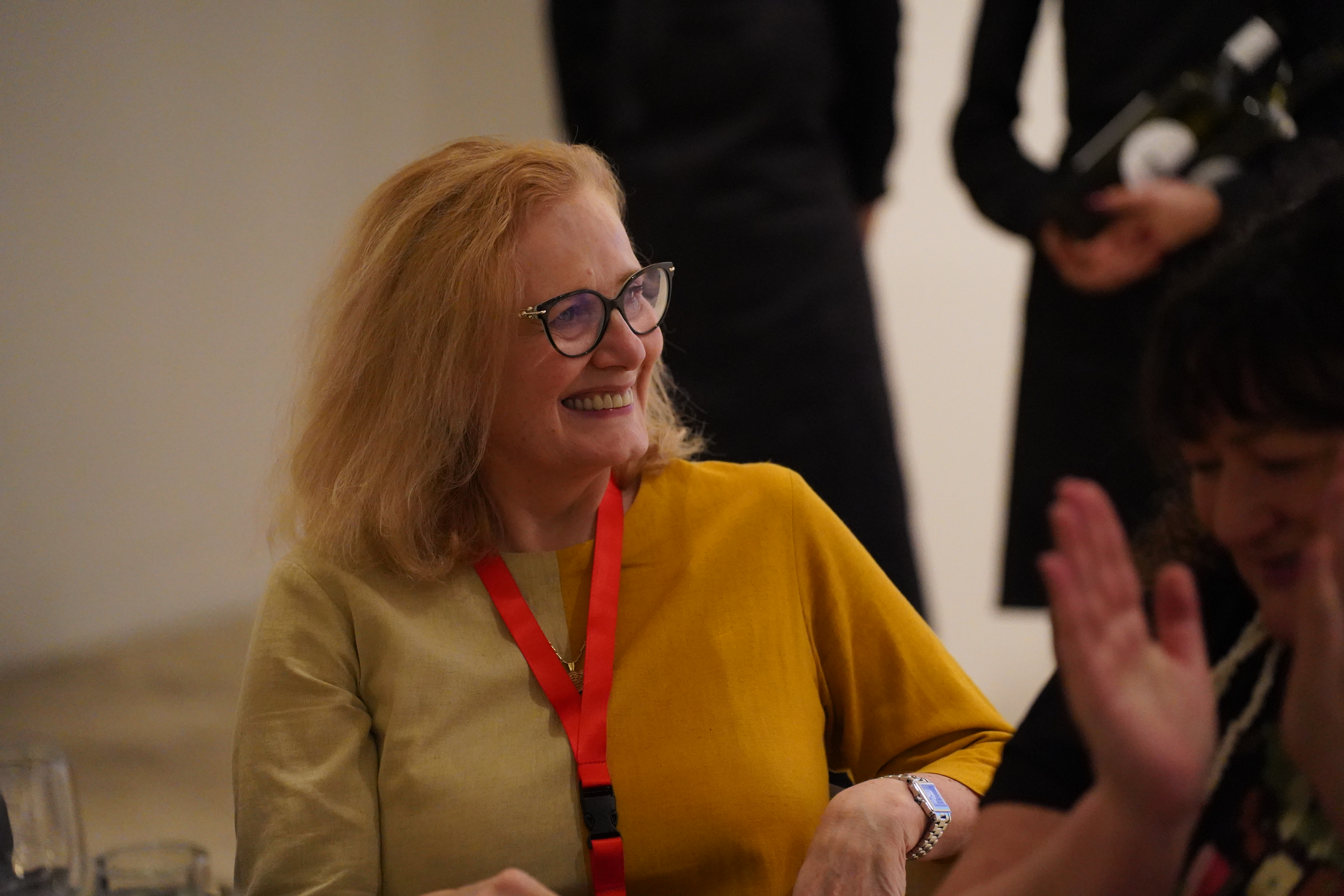
- Occupation: CEO
- Employer(s): British Council, IFLA
- Known for: Secretary General of the IFLA

Sharon Memis is a British researcher and administrator who worked for the British Council. She became the International Federation of Library Associations and Institutions (IFLA)'s Secretary General in 2023.

== Life ==
Memis worked for the British Council in London, India, America and Belgium. She is fluent in French and Spanish. In 2010 she published "Citizen Diplomacy Organizations Throughout The World: Opportunities For Cooperation Roundtable" which included views as the basis for discussion.

In 2021 she was the British Council's Director in America.

She became the IFLA Secretary General in 2023 taking over from Helen Mandl who had been a temporary appointee. Her appointment was announced by the then IFLA President Barbara Lison. Lison was succeeded by the Australian librarian Vicki McDonald.In October 2023 Memis and Vicki McDonald announced that the 2024 IFLA World Library and Information Congress would be cancelled. This followed a decision by the Emirates Library and Information Association to withdraw their invitation to hold the conference in Dubai. That conference was cancelled as there was no immediate offers to host it. The Mohammed Bin Rashid Library in Dubai announced that it would be hosting the "First Dubai International Library Conference" in November 2024. Memis was to be one of the speakers.

In 2024 the decision was made to hold the 2025 World Library and Information Congress in Astana in Kazakhstan. This followed a successful campaign by the Kazakhstan tourist board to host the first library congress in central Asia.
