= International and comparative librarianship =

International and comparative librarianship (ICL) is a specialization of library and information science dedicated to the study and comparison of professional practices within the different context of practice. It unites both international and comparative librarianships. Its foremost spokesperson is the IFLA.

== Description of both traditions ==
=== International librarianship ===
International librarianship is a set of activities between information institutions of multiple nations with the aim of promoting, establishing, developing, maintaining and evaluate library pactices and the development of library work.

=== Comparative librarianship ===
Comparative librarianship studies various aspects of library work taking place in different contexts with the aim of better understanding underlying similarities and differences, and presenting their causes. The core of the discipline is to propos generalisations and principles that are manifesting simultaneously in all of the contexts studied.

=== Debates of differentiation ===
Some debates for the différenciation and delimitation of both branches took place in the 1970s. Summarizing these discussions, the south african librarian and ex-secretary of IFLA, Peter Johan Lor, concludes that the main difference between both approaches is that international librarianship is a set of shared themes while comparative is closer to a set of analytical methods.

== Main areas of activities ==
As a discipline linked to international studies, ICL refers to various of its issues and problematics. It inherited from international librarianship an affinity for internationalism, globalisation, international relations, and a significant interest for international issues of information access. From comparative librarianship, it inherited themes of practice improvement, of perspective diversification, and knowledge advancement.

Furthermore, IFLA promotes UNESCO's objectives and so shares their values. These values are therefore associated with ICL.
