= John Tsebe =

Former Head Librarian of the National Library of South Africa (NLSA)

- Alma mater: University of Limpopo; Syracuse University School of Information Studies; Harvard Kennedy School
- Occupation: Librarian
- Position held: National Librarian (2004–2014), president (2015–2019), IFLA member (2007–2011)

John Kgwale Tsebe is a South African librarian and information science leader who has held prominent national, regional, and international roles. Tsebe is well known for his transformative contribution to library and information services, and for leadership positions in African and global library associations.

Tsebe was appointed as National Librarian of the Library of South Africa (March 2004 – February 2014) and he played a significant role in the development of the South African Library and Information Services (LIS) sector and Library and Information Association of South Africa (LIASA).

Syracuse University have recognized him among their notable alumni.

== Early life and education ==
John K. Tsebe earned his undergraduate and postgraduate degrees from the University of the North (now University of Limpopo) and obtained a master's degree in Library and Information Science from Syracuse University, USA. He also earned a Master in Public Administration (MPA) from Harvard University.

== Career ==
=== National Library of South Africa ===
John K. Tsebe served as National Librarian & Chief Executive Officer (CEO) of the National Library of South Africa (NLSA) from March 2004 until his retirement in February 2014. During his tenure, he was involved in repositioning the NLSA, working to enhance access to information and strengthen the institution's role as a centre of excellence.

=== Association and Institutional Leadership ===
John K. Tsebe was a founding member of the Library and Information Association of South Africa (LIASA) and served as President of the African Library & Information Associations & Institutions (AfLIA) for two terms. He was Vice Chair and then Chair of the Forum of University Librarians of South Africa (FULSA), which later evolved into the Committee of Higher Education Librarians of South Africa (CHELSA). He participated in drafting the Library and Information Services Transformation Charter for South Africa, submitted to the Department of Arts and Culture in February 2014.

== Honours and Recognition ==
In 2014, the South African government hosted a farewell function for Tsebe after his 40 years of service in the Library and Information sector. He was awarded an honorary doctorate by the Commonwealth University and the London Graduate School in recognition of his distinguished service. In 2018, at the 50th anniversary of the Standing Conference of Eastern, Central and Southern African Library and Information Associations (SCECSAL) presented him with The SCECSAL Recognition Award for his contributions to that organization and library science as a whole.
