= Wang-Chen Hsiu Chin =

Wang-Chen Hsiu Chin (1922 — 8 May 1983) was a Singaporean librarian and journalist. She was the University Librarian of the University of Singapore and the president of the Library Association of Singapore.

== Early life ==
Wang was born in Singapore in 1922. She attended Chong Hock Girls' School. She then went to China to complete her secondary education. She obtained her first degree in law from the National Chung Cheng University.

== Career ==
Wang returned to Singapore in 1946. She was then employed at the Nanyang Siang Pau as a journalist and the head of its resource centre. She then went to left for the United States, and obtained both her MA in Political Science and Master of Librianship from the University of Washington. She returned to Singapore in 1955 and became a library assistant of the University of Malaya. In 1967, she became the acting librarian of the university, which had by then become the University of Singapore. She served as the university's librarian from 1974 to 1978, during which she oversaw the library's rapid expansion.

She was the president of the Library Association of Singapore. As the association's president, she represented Singapore at the International Conference on Cataloguing Principles, which was held in Paris in October 1961. She served as a librarian at the University of Oregon for two years. She was involved in the preliminary planning of the Central Library, NUS in Kent Ridge.

== Personal life and death ==
Wang married Wang Tso, who served as a registrar of Nanyang University and as the principal of the Pay Fong Middle School in Malacca, Malaysia. Together, they had one daughter and two sons.

Wang, who had been suffering from cancer, died on 8 May 1983.
