= Christine Deschamps =

French librarian

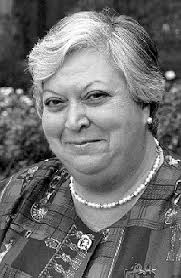
- Christine Deschamps at the 69th IFLA General Conference and Council - Berlin 2003
- Born: France
- Occupation: Librarian
- Known for: President of The International Federation of Library Associations and Institutions 1997-2003
- Predecessor: Robert Wedgeworth
- Successor: Kay Raseroka

Christine Deschamps is a French librarian. She was president of the International Federation of Library Associations and Institutions (IFLA) from 1997 to 2003. She wanted to lead the library sector towards a truly international work, and make it more inclusive for those whom English was not their first language. She stated that she wanted her presidency to be remembered as a pragmatic mandate.

== Professional career ==
Deschamps was the last IFLA President to serve before the International Federation of Librarians' statutes were changed to a model where instead of electing the president, an elected president would be elected two years before becoming president of the Federation. She was re-elected after her 4-year term (1997 to 2001) to serve for two more years as president (2001 to 2003), where she promoted the work of libraries in the global information age, education, and standards development.

Before becoming president of the International Federation of Librarians, Deschamps held various positions at Parisian university libraries and also at the Ministry of Education in France.

=== Libraries and the World Summit on the Information Society ===
Deschamps called for libraries to be recognized at the United Nations World Summit on the Information Society as key participants in closing the digital divide. The digital divide and internet filters were topics that she worked on during the World Information Congresses.

Under her mandate, the First World Report on Libraries and Intellectual Freedom was established and she made statements on electronic publications and copyright. This work confirmed two committees in the Federation of Librarians: the Committee on Copyright (Copyright and other legal issues or CLM for its acronym) and the Freedom of Expression and Freedom of Access to information (FAIFE).

=== Internationalization of the library sector ===
Deschamps worked to decentralize the International Federation of Librarians (IFLA). She explained that she felt "that rebalancing power in the IFLA organization is necessary because there is a lot of influence from Europe and North America" and that developing countries should have a greater participation in the Federation.

In 1999, Deschamps and Jay Jordan of the Online Computer Library Centre (OCLC) announced the creation of the IFLA/OCLC Early Career Development Fellowship to enable librarians from developing countries to go to the United States for training and to visit North American Libraries.

== Awards and distinctions ==
- Deschamps was recognized as an honorary member of the IFLA (Honorary Fellow in English) in 2003, along with Marianne Scott.
- Deschamps received the National Order of the Legion of Honor (in French: Chevalier de la Légion d'Honneur) in 2001.
