= Maria Musoke =

Ugandan Information scientist

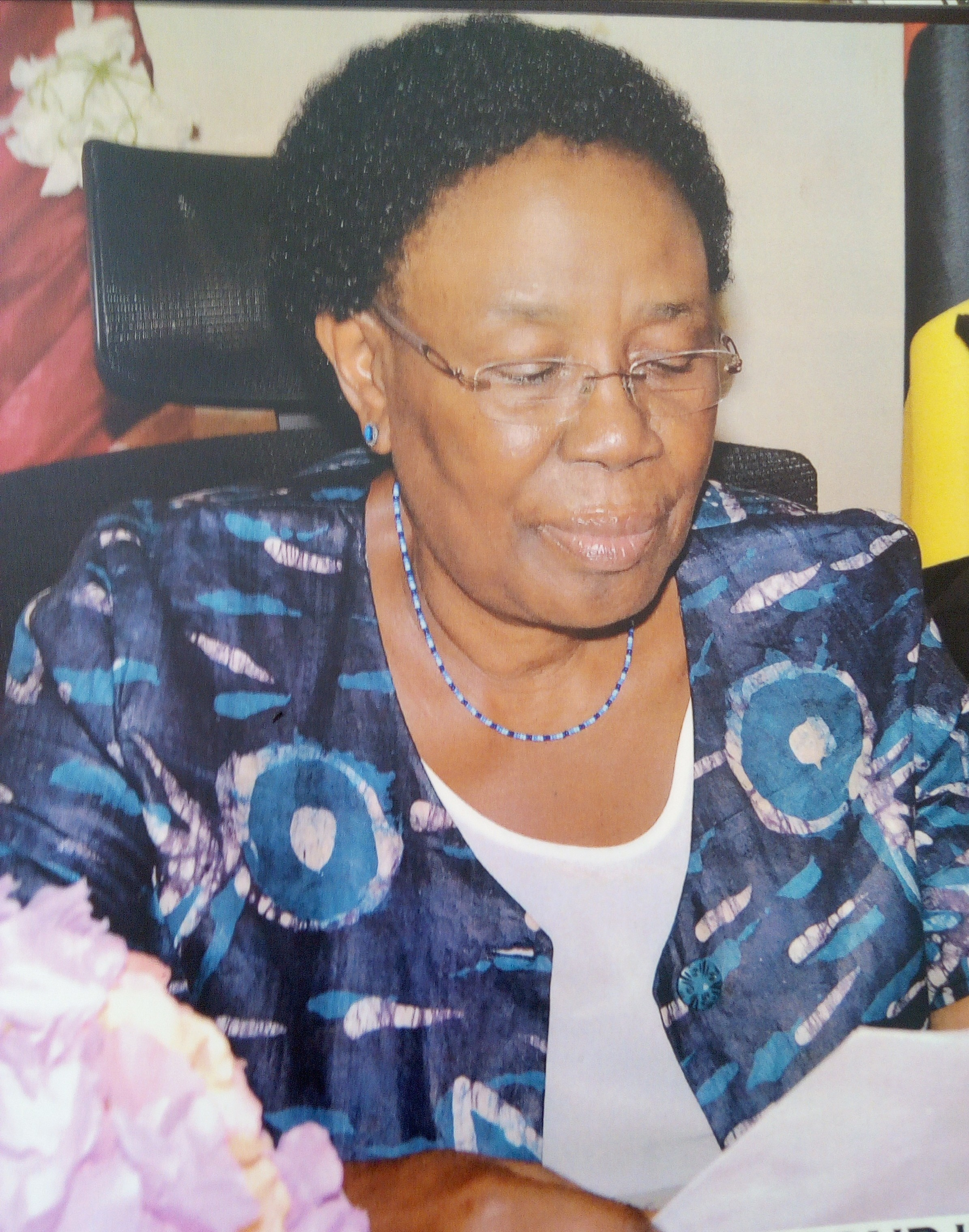
Maria Musoke picture

Maria Musoke, sometimes referred to as Maria G.N. Musoke (born 19 January 1955) is a Ugandan information scientist and academician. She is the first Ugandan woman to obtain a PhD in Information Science. She is a professor of Information Science and a Deputy Vice Chancellor (May 2018–) at Kyambogo University in Uganda. She also serves as a council member (2019–2022) of the Uganda National Academy of Sciences.

== Early life and education ==
Musoke was born on 19 January 1955 in Masaka District, Central Uganda. She attended Trinity College Nabbingo for her Ordinary level Certificate and Advanced level classes (S1-S6). She then entered Makerere University in 1974, to study botany, Zoology and Education, graduating with the Bachelor of Science degree and Diploma in Education in 1978. She later obtained a Post Graduate Diploma in Librarianship in 1980 after which she pursued a Master of Librarianship and Information Science, specializing in health information at the University of Wales, Great Britain. In 2001, she graduated from the University of Sheffield, becoming the first woman in Uganda to acquire a PhD in Information science.

== Professional career ==
Musoke was a librarian at the Albert Cook Medical Library at Makerere University prior to becoming the University Librarian of Makerere University Library from 2004 to 2014. She would then become the first female professor of information science in 2010. She later joined the East African School of Library and Information Science at Makerere University in 2015. In May 2018, she was appointed Deputy Vice-Chancellor in charge of Academic Affairs at Kyambogo University. She was appointed alongside Associate Prof. Annabella Habinka Basaza of Mbarara University and Prof. John Robert Tabuti as Government representatives to Busitema University Senate. She has authored several publications.

Musoke received an Honorary Fellowship award in 2018 from the Chartered Institute of Library and Information Professionals (CILIP) in recognition of her contribution to the Library and Information Science profession. She is a Standing Committee member of Health and Biosciences Libraries Section of the International Federation of Library Associations and Institutions (IFLA) (2011–), a member of the International Working Committee on Big data in Open data world (2015–) and an Advisory Council member for Research4Life in 2013.

In 2018, Musoke won the Author of the Year-Book Category award at the XXIII Standing Conference of Eastern, Central and Southern African Library and Information Associations (SCECSAL), as well as the SCECSAL Excellence Awards at the 2024 Conference.

== Publications ==
- Musoke, Maria G. N. (2008-11-01). "Strategies for addressing the university library users' changing needs and practices in Sub-Saharan Africa". The Journal of Academic Librarianship. 34 (6): 532–538. doi:10.1016/j.acalib.2008.10.002. ISSN 0099-1333.
- Musoke, Maria G.N. (2007-01-01). "Information behaviour of primary health care providers in rural Uganda: An interaction-value model". Journal of Documentation. 63 (3): 299–322. doi:10.1108/00220410710743261. ISSN 0022-0418.
- Musoke, Maria G. N. (2000). "Information and its value to health workers in rural Uganda: a qualitative perspective*". Health Libraries Review. 17 (4): 194–202. doi:10.1111/j.1471-1842.2000.00289.x. ISSN 1365-2532. PMID 11198325.
- Musoke, Maria G.N. (2009-01-01). "Document supply services enhance access to information resources in Uganda". Interlending & Document Supply. 37 (4): 171–176. doi:10.1108/02641610911006256. ISSN 0264-1615.
- Musoke, Maria G. N. (2005). "Access and use of information by primary health care providers in rural Uganda: an interaction-value model". University of Dar Es Salaam Library Journal. 7 (1): 1–19.
- Musoke, Maria G. N.; Mwesigwa, Andrew (2017-04-02). "Informing Policy and Practice Through Assessment of New Library Books' Usage at Makerere University". Library Collections, Acquisitions, & Technical Services. 40 (1–2): 10–27. doi:10.1080/14649055.2016.1263501. ISSN 1464-9055. S2CID 63022272.
