= Library Association of Singapore =

- Library Association of Singapore
- (Malay: Persatuan Perpustakaan Singapura)
- Abbreviation: LAS
- Predecessor: Persatuan Perpustakaan Malaysia, Chawagan Singapura (Library Association of Malaysia, Singapore Branch)
- Merged into: Persatuan Perpustakaan Tanah Melayu (1964)
- Formation: January 7, 1955; 71 years ago
- Registration no.: (UEN) S65SS0038H
- Legal status: Registered society
- Headquarters: National Library, Singapore
- Region served: Singapore
- Website: www.las.org.sg

The Library Association of Singapore (LAS) is a national-level, professional organization for Singapore's librarians and library workers.

== History ==
LAS was originally part of the Malayan Library Group created in March 1955, which was renamed in 1958 to become the Library Association of Malaya and Singapore. It became the Library Association of Singapore in 1960 as it was split from Persatuan Perpustakaan Persekutuan Tanah Melayu (Malaysia). Then it was reconstituted as the Persatuan Perpustakaan Malaysia, Chawagan Singapura (Library Association of Malaysia, Singapore Branch) in 1964, and finally Persatuan Perpustakaan Singapura in 1966. The name was changed from its Malay version to the English version used currently only in March 1975.

== Presidents ==
Below is a list of presidents throughout the history of the Library Association of Singapore.

President	Years served
Leonard M Harrod	1955
Ernest H Clark	1955 - 1956
P G M G Mahindasa	1956 - 1957
Jean M Waller	1957 - 1958
Hedwig Anuar	1958 - 1961
Wang-Chen Hsiu Chin	1961 - 1963
Hedwig Anuar	1963 - 1965
Wang-Chen Hsiu Chin	1965 - 1966
Khoo Oon Chor	1966 - 1967
Rosemary Yeap	1967 - 1968
Patricia Lim Pui Huen	1968 - 1969
Wang-Chen Hsiu Chin	1969 - 1970
Lim Hong Too	1970 - 1972
Chan Thye Seng	1972 - 1973
Koh Thong Ngee	1973 - 1975
Wee Joo Gim	1975 - 1978
Foo Kok Pheow	1978 - 1980
Wee Joo Gim	1980 - 1982
Peggy Wai-Chee Hochstadt	1982 - 1984
R Ramachandran	1984 - 1988
Lim Hong Too	1988 - 1989
Jenny Neo	1989 - 1991
R Ramachandran	1991 - 1995
Isabel Yeo	1995 - 1997
Choy Fatt Cheong	1997 - 2005
Sylvia Yap	2005 - 2007
Ngian Lek Choh	2007 - 2009
Puspa Yeow	2009 - 2011
Gene Tan	2011 - 2013
Lee Cheng Ean	2013 - 2015
Judy Ng	2015 - 2017
Samantha Ang Seok Hian	2017 - 2019
Tan Chui Peng	2019 - 2021
Sadie-Jane Nunis	2021 - 2023
Soh Lin Li	2023 - 2025
Ms Shameem Nilofar Maideen	2025 - 2027

== Publications ==
LAS is responsible for publishing the Singapore Journal of Library and Information Management (SJLIM) (ISSN 2382-5626). Beginning in 1971, this scholarly journal is written in English and refereed. Another publication is the Singapore Libraries Bulletin for news and information purposes.

In 99 Words: Stories Librarians Tell (ISBN 9789810767938) is a book published by LAS in 2013 and launched during the 2013 IFLA conference held in Singapore.

== International Involvement ==
Together with International Federation of Library Associations and Institutions (IFLA) and National Library Board they organized the IFLA World Library and Information Congress in 2013. LAS was one of three partners to organize the Asia-Pacific Library and Information Conference (APLIC) held on July 29, 2018, in Canberra, Australia.

== See also ==
- List of library associations
- List of libraries in Singapore
