= Vicki McDonald =

Australian librarian active in IFLA

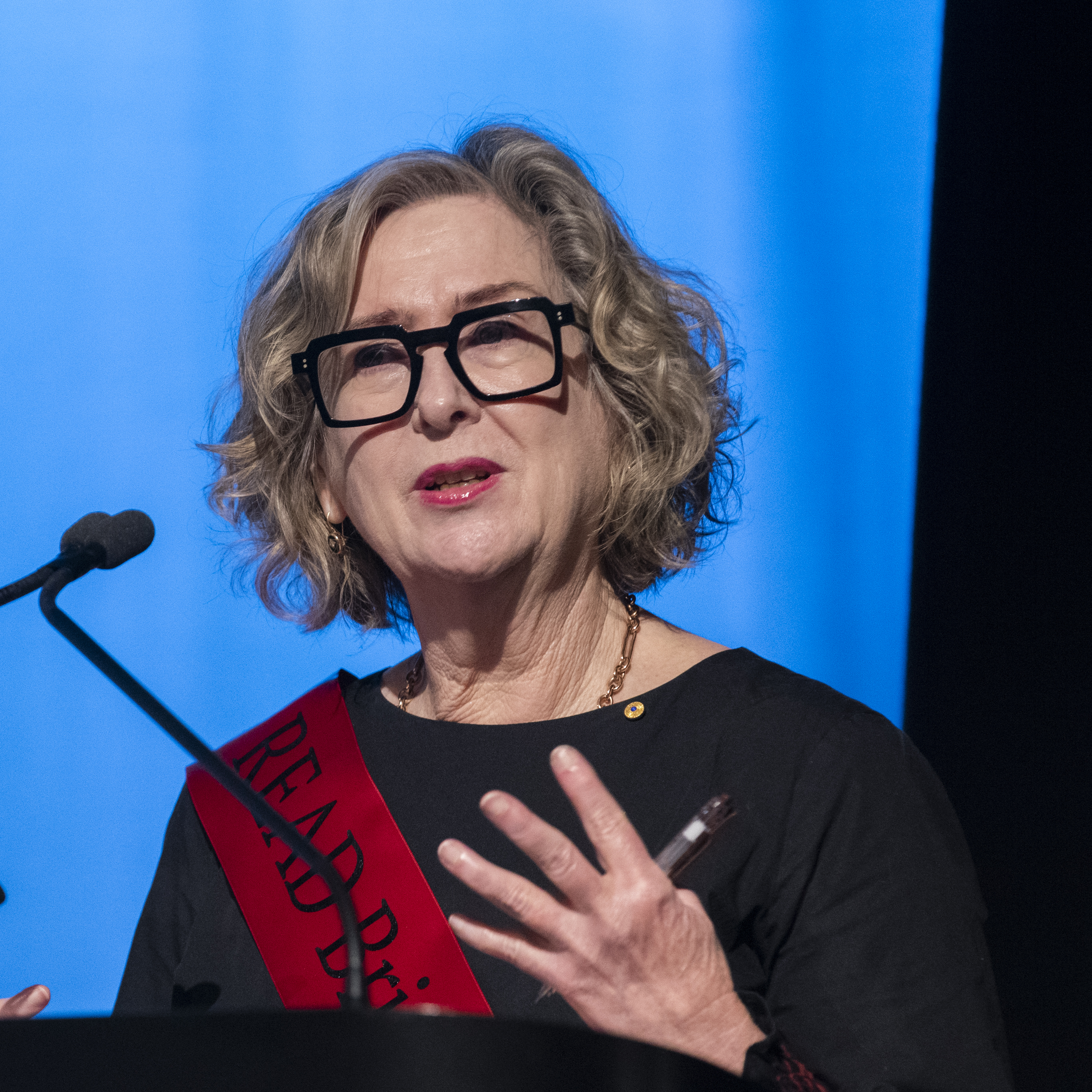
- McDonald in 2024 in Brisbane
- Born: Vicki Gayle McDonald
- Occupation: Librarian
- Known for: IFLA President
- Predecessor: Barbara Lison
- Website: vickimcdonald.com

Vicki Gayle McDonald AM is an Australian librarian who served as President of the International Federation of Library Associations and Institutions (IFLA) from 2023 to 2025.

== Life ==
McDonald's first library was at the Dalby-Wambo Public Library in Queensland, Australia, which she joined as a librarian assistant.

She credits the German librarian Claudia Lux with noting, correctly, that she would become addicted to the work of the International Federation of Library Associations and Institutions in 2005.

She became the head of Library and Information Services at the State Library of New South Wales in Sydney. The value of the New South Wales Library's collections had an estimated value of three billion dollars.

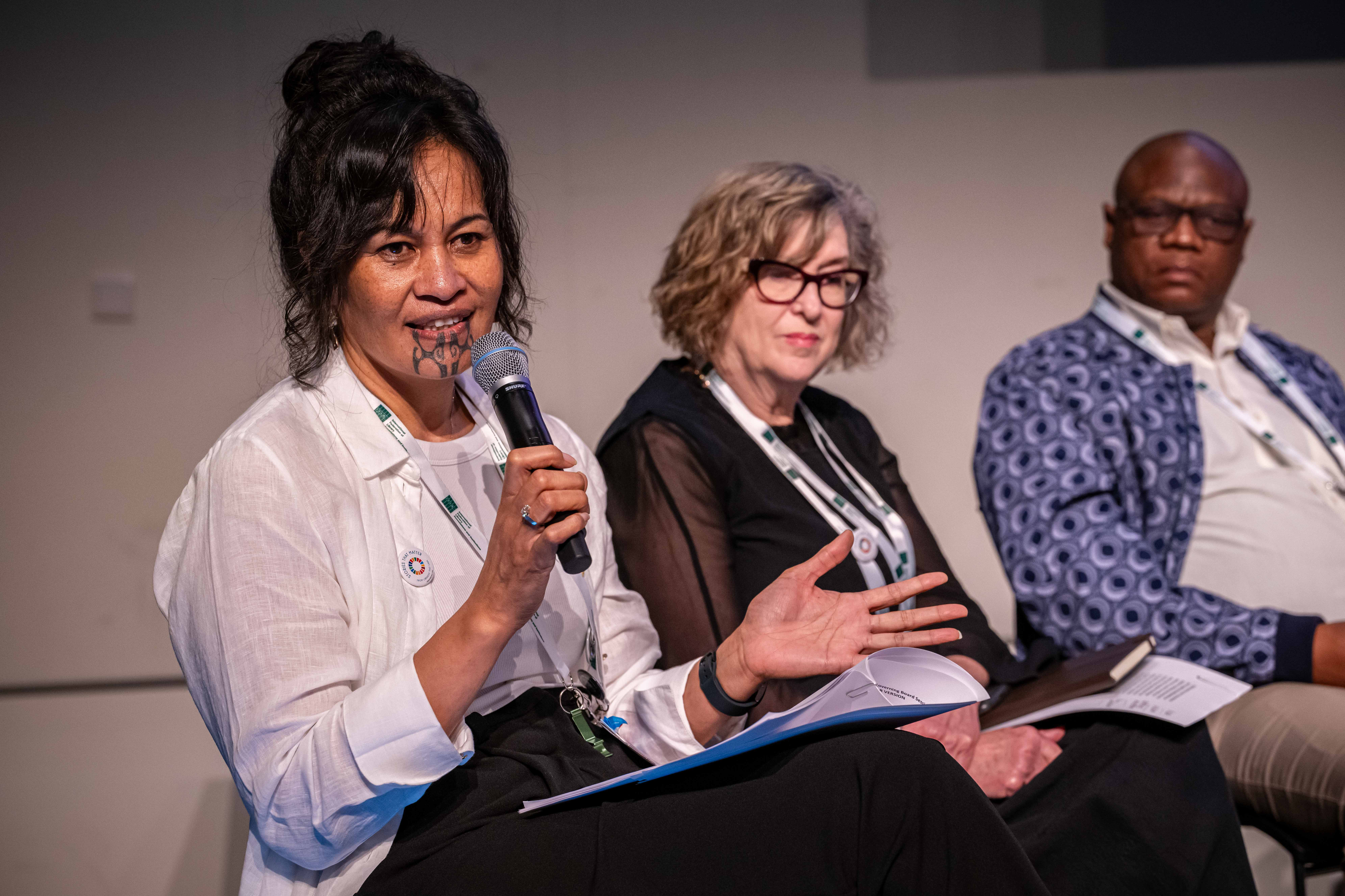
On the IFLA Governing Board in 2023

In 2015, she moved from New South Wales to become the State Librarian and Chief Executive Officer of State Library of Queensland. The library encourages young writers and the increased involvement of Aboriginal and Torres Strait Islanders in the state with IT at more than 25 Indigenous Knowledge Centres.

In 2019, she was made a fellow of the Australian Library and Information Association (ALIA). She had been a keen and active member and she had served as ALIA's President.

On 26 January 2020, McDonald was appointed a Member of the Order of Australia for her work with libraries and their associations.

She was elected to became President of the IFLA for two years starting in 2023. She succeeded the German librarian Barbara Lison. In October 2023, Sharon Memis and McDonald announced that the 2024 World Library and Information Congress would be cancelled. This followed a decision by the Emirates Library and Information Association to withdraw their bid to hold the conference in Dubai. McDonald was serving in 2024 when the decision was made to hold the 2025 World Library and Information Congress in Astana in Kazakstan. This followed a successful campaign by the Kazakstan tourist board to host the first library congress in central Asia.
