= Information Development =

- Discipline: Information Science
- Language: English
- Edited by: J. Stephen Parker

Publication details
- History: 1985 - present
- Publisher: SAGE Publications
- Frequency: Quarterly
- Impact factor: 0.440 (2013)

Standard abbreviations
- ISO 4: Inf. Dev.

Indexing
- ISSN: 0266-6669 (print); 1741-6469 (web)
- LCCN: 85642269
- OCLC no.: 12151554

Links
- Journal homepage; Online access; Online archive

Information Development is a peer-reviewed academic journal that publishes papers in the field of Information Science. The journal's editor is J. Stephen Parker (IFLA). It has been in publication since 1985 and is currently published by SAGE Publications.

== Scope ==
Information Development aims to provide authoritative coverage of current developments in the provision, management and use of information and communication technology. The journals' main focus is on the information needs and problems of developing countries. Information Development focuses on the development of information systems, services and skills, and the role of information in personal and national development.

== Abstracting and indexing ==
Information Development is abstracted and indexed in, among other databases: SCOPUS, and the Social Sciences Citation Index. According to the Journal Citation Reports, its 2013 impact factor is 0.440, ranking it 57 out of 83 journals in the category 'Information Science & Library Science'.
