= Kay Raseroka =

Botswanan librarian, information professional and academic

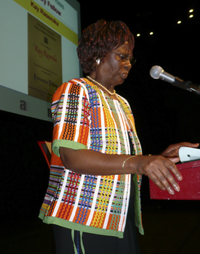
- Kay Raseroka to receiving the title of Honorary Doctor of Laws from the University of Alberta–Canada, June 7, 2010.
- Born: South Africa
- Occupation: Librarian
- Known for: President of The International Federation of Library Associations and Institutions 2003–2005
- Predecessor: Christine Deschamps
- Successor: Alex Byrne

Helen Kay Raseroka is a librarian who was born in Kwazulu-Natal, South Africa with Botswana citizenship. She is a former President of The International Federation of Library Associations and Institutions (IFLA) from 2003 to 2005, under the theme "Libraries for lifelong literacy".

== Career ==
Raseroka has worked in the library and information service sector for over two decades, during which she made tremendous contributions to the profession both locally and internationally.

She has been the Director University of Botswana Library Services, a position she left in 2010. She served as President of the International Federation of Library Associations and Institutions (IFLA), being the first candidate for Africa, between 2003 and 2005. She is a member of the Board of Trustees of the International Network for the Availability of Scientific Publications.

She was a founding member of Botswana Library Association and regionally, the founding chairperson of the Standing Conference of National and University Librarians of East, Central and Southern Africa. She has also served as a board member of CODE Canada, an international literacy for children that works with partners in the developing world to support a sustainable literate environment and served as a member of the NOMA Award for Publishing in Africa and founded the Botswana Children's Information trust.

She has devoted more than thirty five years to promoting the importance of oral information and learning systems in indigenous communities. In recognition of her contributions, she was awarded the Honorary Doctor of Laws of the University of Alberta (Canada). Currently, she is serving as a member of a multidisciplinary research team working towards the formulation of the National Indigenous Knowledge Systems Policy.

=== Groups ===
She has been involved in the RDA’S Libraries for Research Data Interest Group through which they advocated for the raising of awareness of Librarians on Open Data. This resulted in a jointly sponsored session at which a presentation entitled “23 Things: Libraries for Research Data” was made, at the annual conference of the International Federation of Library Associations and Institutions held in Cape Town in 2015.

She has been engaged in the formative stages of the Interest Group on cloud computing infrastructures for Developing World Research (DWR) and in the process was introduced to CODATA which is a partner to RDA.

Due to her association with these two bodies, she was able to link Botswana, through Joint Minds Consult, in raising awareness of the Research Community in Botswana on the need for coordination of research data to enable accessibility, usability, and interoperability through the globally accepted principles of Open Data/ Open Science (ODOS). As Director of Knowledge Development and Management at Joint Minds Consult, she has provided leadership to guide discourse on Open Data and Open Science in Botswana. As a result, Joint Minds Consult has taken a leading role in shaping discourse at a national level.

=== Participations ===
Her distinguished career includes serving as the first African president of the International Federation of Library Associations and Libraries (IFLA). She is a member of the Library Services Advisory Council at Lubutu Library Partners, the Chartered Institute of Library and Information Professionals (FCILIP) of the United Kingdom, member of the Nigerian Library Association (FNLA) and the Library and Information Association of South Africa (LIASA).

She founded the Botswana Children's Information Trust in support of integration of school with indigenous knowledge learning systems through story telling by elders and the children sharing and writing their own stories dedicating more than 35 years to promoting the importance of oral learning in indigenous communities.

== Awards and other distinctions ==
On 7 June 2010, Kay Raseroka received the title of Honorary Doctor of Laws from the University of Alberta–Canada.

== Published works ==
- Hayden, C., & Raseroka, H. (1988). The Good and the Bad: Two Novels of South Africa. Children’s Literature Association Quarterly, 13, 57–60. https://doi.org/10.1353/chq.0.0619
- Raseroka, H. (1992). The Standing Conference of Eastern Central and Southern Librarians: A critical assessment. Information Development - INF DEV, 8, 30–34. https://doi.org/10.1177/026666699200800107
- Raseroka, H. K. (1993). The Role and Purpose of the University Library in a Rapidly Changing Information Environment with Reference to the Eastern and Southern African Region. IFLA Journal, 19(1), 50.
- Raseroka, H. K. (1994). Changes in public libraries during the last twenty years: An African perspective. Libri, 44(2), 153.
- Raseroka, H. (1995). Ten Years of Information Development in East, Central and So u th ern Africa. Information Development - INF DEV, 11, 56–59.
- Raseroka, K. (1997). Challenges of an Interactive Environment in the Context of Developing Countries in sub-Saharan Africa. International Information and Library Review, 29(3–4), 487.
- Bloss, M. E., Hegedus, P., Law, D., Nilsen, S., Raseroka, K., Rodriguez, A., & Wu, J. (2000). IFLA Advisory Group on Division 8.
- Raseroka, H. K. (2001). Lifelong Learning: Bridging the Digital Divide and Planning for the Future. IFLA Journal, 27(5/6), 328.
- Raseroka, H. (2001). Seizing the Moment: Issues and Opportunities towards the Creation of an Information Society. Ifla Journal, 27, 322–327. https://doi.org/10.1177/034003520102700507
- Raseroka, K. (2003). «Not in My Wildest Dreams»: IFLA Journal interviews Kay Raseroka. Ifla Journal, 29, 205–208. https://doi/10.1177/034003520302900302
- Raseroka, K. (2003). Libraries for Lifelong Literacy: IFLA Presidential Theme 2003–2005. IFLA Journal, 29(2), 109.
- Raseroka, Kay [Open Access: what does it mean for developing countries? - Roundtable]., 2003 . In Open Access to Scientific and Technical Information: State of the Art and Future Trends, Paris, 23–24 January 2003. [Presentation]. http://eprints.rclis.org/4578/
- Raseroka, K. (2004). World Library And Information Congress, Buenos Aires, Argentina, August 2004: Opening Address. IFLA Journal, 30(4), 272–274.
- Raseroka, K. (2005). President's Report. In IFLA Journal (Vol. 31, Issue 4, pp. 350–254).
- Raseroka, K. (2005). From the Secretariat. IFLA Journal, 31(1), 96–97.
- Raseroka, K. (2005). Africa to Africa: building its knowledge community. African Research and Documentation, (99), 3–11.
- Raseroka, K., Byrne, A., & Lor, P. (2005). IFLA Governing Board: Outcomes of the March 2005 Meeting. IFLA Journal, 31(3), 274.
- Raseroka, K., Bowden, R., Abeysinghe, W. A., Amarasiri, U., & Were, J. (2005). Tsunami News. IFLA Journal, 31(1), 93–94.
- Raseroka, K. (2006). Access to information and knowledge. Human rights in the global information society, 91–105.
- Raseroka, K. (2006). Information Literacy Development within Oral Cultures: Challenges and Opportunities within a Southern African Country. https://archive.ifla.org/IV/ifla72/papers/082-Raseroka-en.pdf
- Raseroka, K. (2008). Information transformation Africa: Indigenous knowledge – Securing space in the knowledge society. International Information and Library Review, 40(4), 243–250.
- Raseroka, H. K., & Mutula, S. M. (2012). 2.2 Botswana Retracing the Impact of Information Communications Technology on Academic Libraries in Sub-Saharan Africa: Case Study of the University of Botswana Library. Libraries in the early 21st century, volume 2: An international perspective, 2, 129.
- Raseroka, K. (2015, July). Leadership Excellence in African Librarianship. In AfLIA| IST AfLIA INTERNATIONAL CONFERENCE.
