= Ludvig Collijn =

Ludvig Collijn (20 November 1878 – 4 October 1939 in Stockholm) was a chess writer and chairman of the Swedish Chess Federation from 1917 to 1939.

At the first Nordic Chess Championship held in Stockholm 1897, Collijn responded consistently against 1.e4 with 1...d5. This chess opening, at the time known as the Centre Counter Gambit, is now commonly referred to as the Scandinavian Defence.

By 1912 he and his brother Gustav were acknowledged for organising the International Chess Conference held in Stockholm that year. They subsequently authored a publication of annotated games of interest from the Stockholm Congress.

Ludvig was a cousin of Isaac Collijn.

== Lärobok ==
In 1896 the brothers authored their "Textbook of Chess", Lärobok i Schack. According to Hooper and Whyld, the fourth edition of Collijn's Lärobok (in Swedish), with groundbreaking contributions by Rubinstein, Réti, Spielmann and Nimzowitsch, was one of the "popular reference sources for strong players between the two world wars".
