= Christine Mackenzie =

Australian librarian

Christine Mackenzie AM
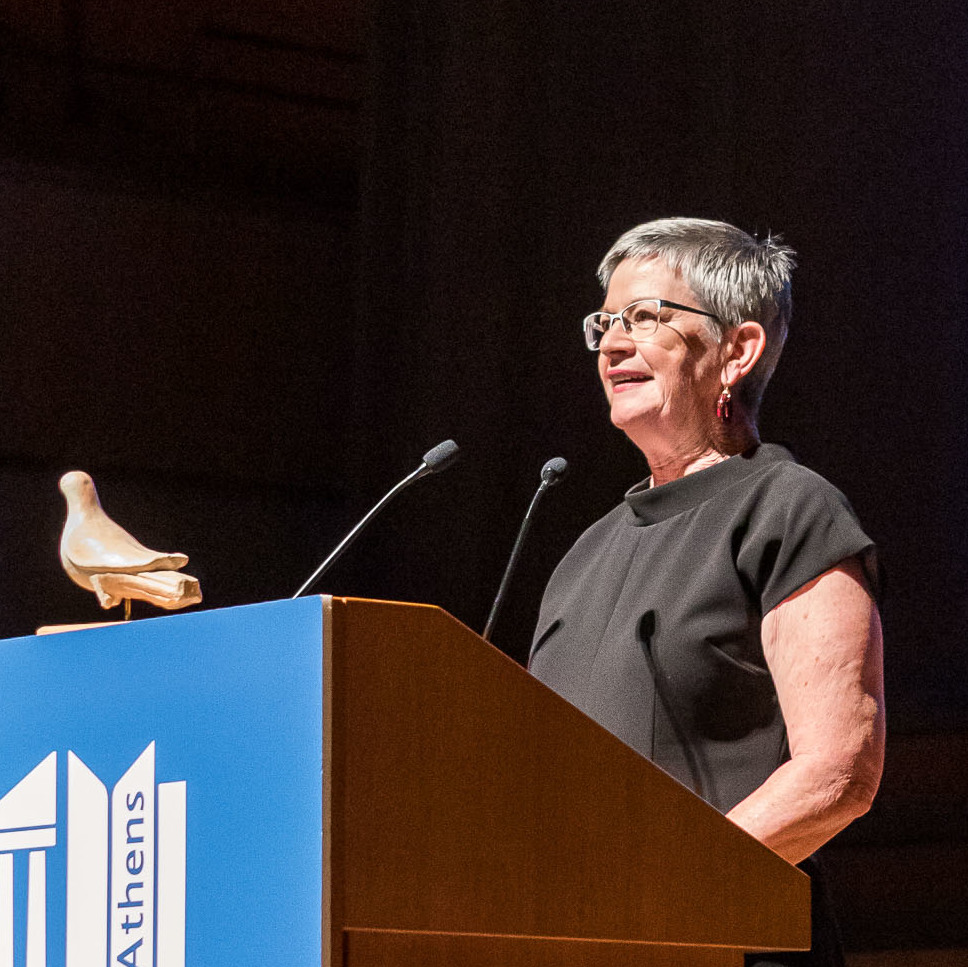
- Christine Mackenzie at the World Library and Information Congress in Athens, 2019
- Occupation: Librarian
- Known for: IFLA President 2019 - 2021
- Website: Official website

Christine Mackenzie AM is an Australian librarian, president of the International Federation of Library Associations and Institutions (IFLA) from 2019 to 2021. Mackenzie was the president-elect from 2017 to 2019 and part of the Governing Board from 2011 to 2013. She worked in the Trend Report.

== Works ==
Christine earned a bachelor of arts, graduated as librarian, 2008 fellow and from 2003 to 2004 president of the Australian Library and Information Association (ALIA).

Christine is the President of the International Federation of Library Associations and Institutions (IFLA) from 2019 to 2021, leading the library field under the theme "Let's work together". Her mandate takes the results of projects as the IFLA Global Vision where librarians around the world created a bottom-up strategy where one of the highlights and opportunities are related to focus on our communities and work more collaborative and develop strong partnerships. She received her presidency from Glòria Pérez-Salmeron in Athens, at the 85th World Library and Information Conference and in her acceptance speech she mentioned the access to information from indigenous languages and to restructure IFLA to achieve the Strategic Framework (2019–2024).

== Honours and awards ==
Mckenzie was awarded with the IFLA Fellowship award for her works towards the library field..

In the 2022 Australia Day Honours Mackenzie was appointed a Member of the Order of Australia for "significant service to librarianship, and to professional associations through leadership roles".
