= Ellen Tise =

South African librarian and president of IFLA from 2009–2011

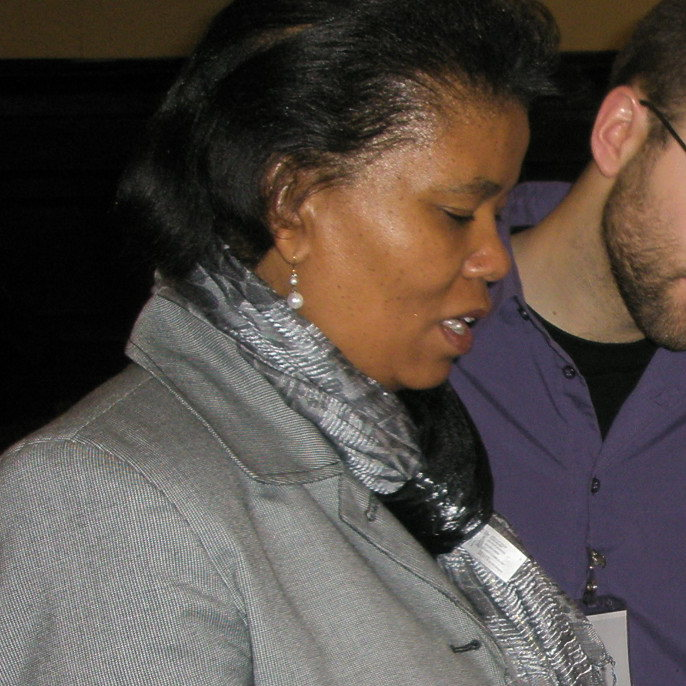
- Born: October 29, 1961 (age 64)
- Occupation: Librarian
- Known for: President of The International Federation of Library Associations and Institutions 2009–2011
- Predecessor: Claudia Lux
- Successor: Ingrid Parent

Ellen Remona Tise (born October 29, 1961) is a South African librarian, president of the International Federation of Library Associations and Institutions (IFLA) from 2009 to 2011, under the theme "Libraries Driving Access to Knowledge (A2K)". Her work has focused on library associations and the open access promoted by the library sector.

== Career ==
Tise was the first president of the Library and Information Association of South Africa (LIASA), a position she held during the periods 2000–2002 and 1998–2000. She was president of the International Federation of Library Associations and Institutions (IFLA) during the period 2009-2011. Since January 2006 she has held the position of Principal Director of the Library and Information Services at Stellenbosch University in South Africa. She is the current President of the Freedom of Access to Information and Freedom of Expression (FAIFE) Advisory Committee of IFLA for the period 2019–2021, and she is an honorary member of LIASA, IFLA, and the Lubutu Library Partners Advisory Board.

== Awards and other distinctions ==
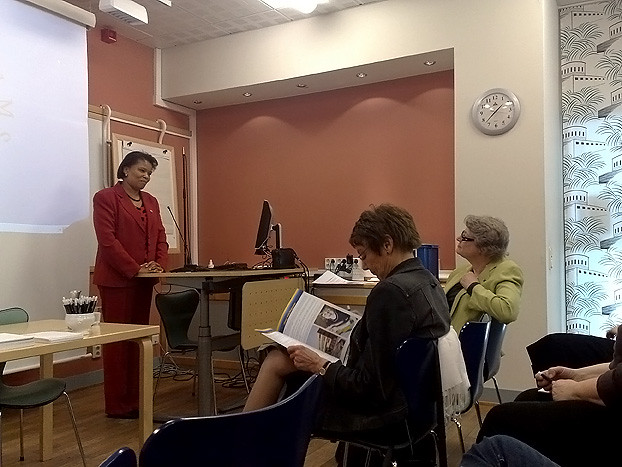
Ellen Tise at the Stockholm Public Library, March 22, 2010

Among the distinctions she has received for her library work are:

- Honorary member of the International Federation of Library Associations and Institutions – IFLA – 2012
- Honorary member of the Library and Information Association of South Africa - LIASA - 2007
- SALI Trust - LIASA Lifetime Achievement Award 2023
- SCECSAL Presidents Award - 2018

== Interviews ==
- Newsmaker: Ellen Tise. (2010). American Libraries, 41(10), 31-31.Retrieved May 2, 2020, from http://www.jstor.org/stable/25734687 28/4/2020 https://www-jstor- org.proxy.timbo.org.uy/stable/25734687
- Fernández, C. M. J., & García, R. C. (2010). Ellen Tise: Presidenta de la IFLA. Mi biblioteca: La revista del mundo bibliotecario, (21), 26-28. https://dialnet.unirioja.es/servlet/articulo?codigo=3188415
- Igwe, U. O. (2013). Open Educational Resources and Driving Access to Knowledge: Action for Libraries in Nigeria

== Published works ==
- Tise, E. (2000). The role of libraries in socio-economic development and the need for information literacy. Meta-info bulletin, 9(2), 55-61.
- Tise, E. R. (2004). Strategies by LIASA to develop library services and the profession in South Africa. Information development, 20(1), 36-42.
- Tise, E. (2004). Information literacy: a challenge for National and University libraries-“a contract for people’s development”. In 6th Standing Conference of African National and University Libraries.
- Tise, E. R., Raju, R., & Masango, C. (2008). Libraries Driving Access to Knowledge: a discussion paper. IFLA Journal, 34(4), 341–346. https://doi.org/10.1177/0340035208099268
- Tise, E. (2009). Access to knowledge through libraries: information services and information literacy today. Library and Information Services Stellenbosch University, South Africa; IFLA President-elect 2007.
- Tise, E. R. (2010). Stellenbosch takes open access lead.
- Tise, E. R. (2010). International perspective on Open Access.
- Tise, E. R. (2010). The President’s Page: Isolation and information famine stifling Africa’s growth. IFLA journal, 36(1), 5-6.
- Tise, E. R. (2011). Strengthening African higher education through the dissemination of research content: the role of the library.
- Tise, E. R. (2011). IFLA imperatives: expounding access to information. IFLA Journal, 37(2), 158-161.
- Tise, E. R. (2011). Libraries are Critical Institutions for Growth and Development. 國家圖書館館刊, (100 年 1), 1-14.
- Tise, E., & Raju, R. (2011). 1.1 Let’s Peal the Onion Together: Exploration of the Outer Limits of International Librarianship: Volume 1. An international perspective. En Libraries in the early 21st century, volume 1. https://doi.org/10.1515/9783110270631.7
- Tise, E. R. (2012). "Libraries Driving Access to Knowledge (A2K)". In Libraries Driving Access to Knowledge. Berlin, Boston: De Gruyter Saur. doi: https://doi.org/10.1515/9783110263121.17
- Tise, E. R., & Raju, R. (2013). Open Access: a new dawn for knowledge management.
- Tise, E. R. (2015). Introduction to Library Trends 64 (1) Summer 2015: Library and Information Services in Africa in the Twenty-First Century.
- Tise, E. R., & Raju, R. (2015). African Librarianship: A Relic, a Fallacy, or an Imperative?. library trends, 64(1), 3-18.
- Tise, E., & Adam, A. (2015). Chapter One From Research Support to Research Partners. The quest for deeper meaning of research support, 1.
- Boshoff, N., Basaza-Ejiri, H. A. D., & Tise, E. R. (2018). Internationally linked authors in Uganda, East Africa: An example of author-level bibliometrics for a developing country.
- Tise, E., & Truran, G. (2019). Unbuckling the subscription model: a South African perspective.
