= Marianne Scott =

Canadian retired librarian and educator (born 1928)

Marianne Florence Scott (born December 4, 1928) is a Canadian retired librarian and educator. She has held several positions in her career, the most notable being the third National Librarian of Canada (NLC). She was not only the first woman to be appointed to the position but also the first professionally educated librarian to hold the post.

== Biography ==
Scott was born on December 4, 1928, in Toronto, Ontario, Canada, to Merle Redvers and Florence Ethel Scott. Marianne Scott studied at McGill University earning a Bachelor of Arts in 1949 and a Bachelor of Library Science in 1952. From 1952 to 1955, Scott was an Assistant Librarian at the Bank of Montreal. She was employed at McGill University from 1955 to 1984, serving as law librarian from 1955 to 1973, lecturer in the Faculty of Law from 1964 to 1975, and director of libraries 1975 to 1984. She was the co-founder of the Index to Canadian Legal Periodical Literature, the first volume was published in 1963. Scott was the first president of the Canadian Association of Law Libraries, which became a formal association on July 5, 1963.

Scott was the president of the Canadian Association of Research Libraries from 1978 to 1979. Scott served as president of the Canadian Library Association from 1981 to 1982. Leaving her position as director of libraries, Scott began working as the NLC in February 1984. She was chair of Conference of Directors of National Libraries (CDNL) from 1988 to 1992. In 1997 the executive board established the Committee on Copyright and other Legal Matters (CLM) and Marianne Scott was invited to become chair. Marianne Scott retired as NLC in 1999, after 15 years.

As of 2000, she was a member of some 23 associations, locally, nationally, and internationally. On October 2, 2009, Marianne Scott was elected president of the Friends of Library and Archives Canada - a position she continues to hold in April 2026

== Honors and awards ==
She was awarded the Queen's Silver Jubilee Medal in 1977. In 1995, she made an Officer of the Order of Canada. She was awarded the IFLA Medal in 1996. In June 2000, Scott was awarded the Canadian Library Association's Outstanding Service to Librarianship Award, the highest honor granted by the Canadian Library Association (CLA) at the annual CLA conference. In 2003, Marianne Scott was awarded IFLA's highest award, Honorary Fellow.
