= UNESCO Public Library Manifesto =

UNESCO manifesto

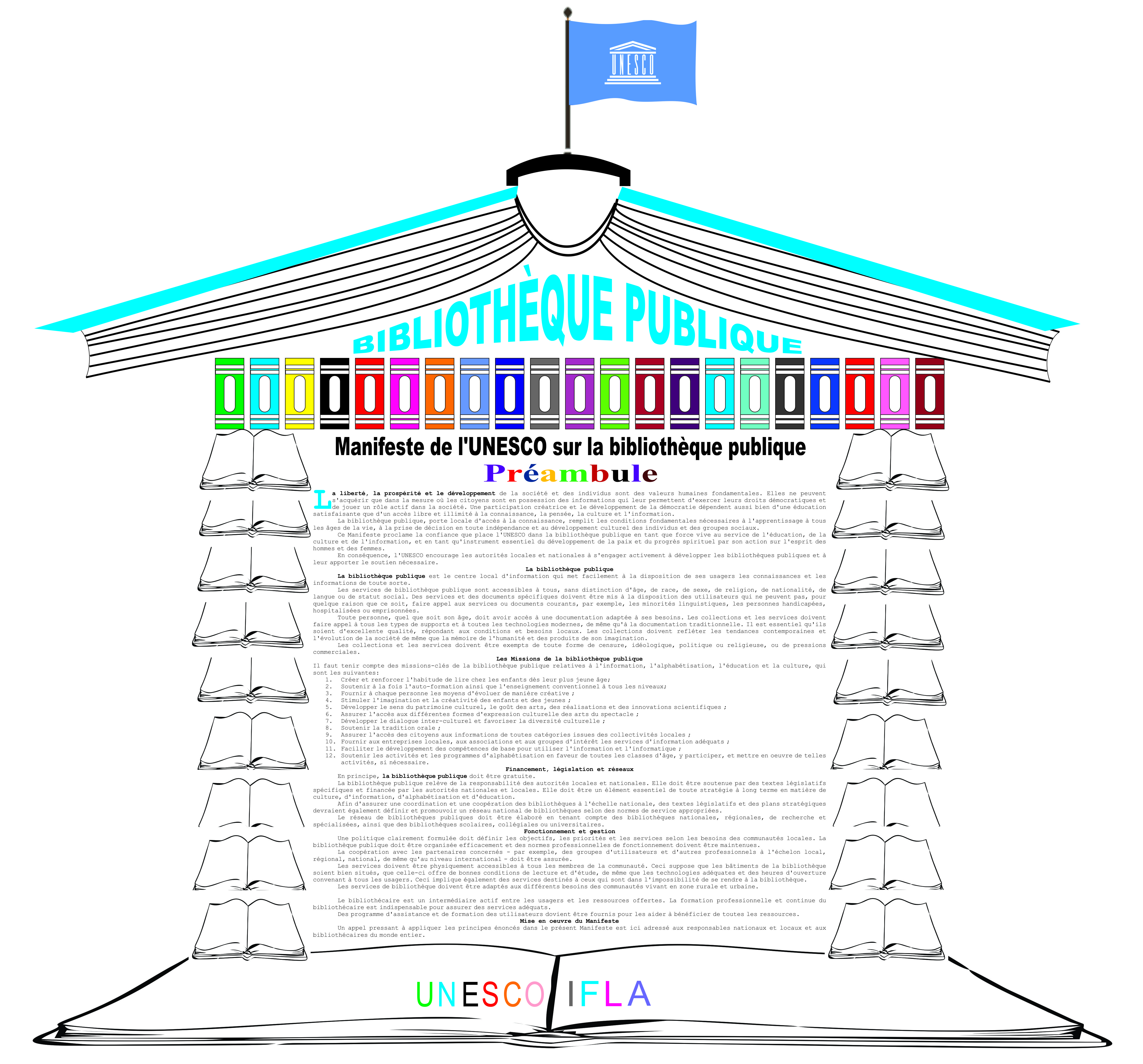
- Portico with the Manifesto of literature (in French)
- Created: 1949
- Ratified: 29 November 1994
- Location: Paris
- Author: UNESCO
- Signatories: International community
- Purpose: Cultural diversity

The UNESCO Public Library Manifesto is a document approved by UNESCO in 1949 and updated in Paris on 29 November, 1994. A further update appeared in July 2022. It declares the entity's belief towards public libraries internationally as essential institutions for the promotion of peace and education for all of humanity.

== History ==
The document was introduced globally in 1949, and has undergone various revisions. The current version includes updates compiled over the course of the PGI Council Meeting of UNESCO in 1994. The Manifesto was prepared with the participation of the public libraries section of the International Federation of Library Associations and Institutions.

== Manifesto principles ==
The Public Library Manifesto, adopted in 1949, proclaims UNESCO's belief in the public library as a force for education, culture and information, and as an essential agent for the fostering of peace and spiritual welfare through the minds of individuals. Recognizing the public library as a local center of culture, the Manifesto lists some requirements for implementation and maintenance of such places.

=== Funding ===
The public library shall in principle be free of charge.

=== Operation and management ===
The library must be physically accessible to all individuals seeking access and located in its own building. It must provide space for use of library resources, offer relevant technology, and has a set of hours when open to its users. When physical visits are not possible, there must be sufficient outreach services available to access these materials otherwise.

=== Legislation ===
Legislation is the responsibility of local and national authorities and shaped according to regional community needs.

=== Integration ===
It proposes that government and society strengthen integration networks to support libraries, for example, in Portugal, for the National Network of Public Libraries.

=== Functional framework ===
The document stipulates that the library workforce should receive necessary continuing professional education.

=== Collections ===
The Manifesto stipulates that the collections are not built only on recent works, seeking to balance the traditional and the modern, in order to include all age groups of the population involved. It also states that collections should be adapted to the different needs of communities in both rural and urban areas.

== Missions of the public library ==
The 1994 publication of the Public Library Manifesto lists 12 key missions related to information, literacy, education, and culture that should be at the core of public library services:

1. Creating and strengthening reading habits in children from an early age;
2. Supporting both individual and self conducted education as well as formal education at all levels;
3. Providing opportunities for personal creative development;
4. Stimulating the imagination and creativity of children and young people;
5. Promoting awareness of cultural heritage, appreciation of the arts, scientific achievements and innovations;
6. Providing access to cultural expressions of all performing arts;
7. Fostering inter-cultural dialogue and favouring cultural diversity;
8. Supporting the oral tradition;
9. Ensuring access for citizens to all sorts of community information;
10. Providing adequate information services to local enterprises, associations and interest groups;
11. Facilitating the development of information and computer literacy skills;
12. Supporting and participating in literary activities and programmes for all age groups, and initiating such activities if necessary.

== See also ==
- UNESCO
- Library portal
