= SCECSAL =

Biennual library conference

Standing Conference of Eastern, Central, and Southern African Library and Information Associations
- Nickname: SCECSAL
- Genre: Library and information science
- Frequency: biennially
- Countries: Botswana, Kenya, Lesotho, Malawi, Namibia, South Africa, Eswatini, Tanzania, Uganda, Zambia, Zimbabwe
- Inaugurated: 1974
- Website: www.scecsal.org

The Standing Conference of Eastern, Central and Southern African Library and Information Associations (SCECSAL) is a regional forum for library and information associations in Africa. It hosts an international conference of member associations every two years, where participants share reports on the status of library science and institutions in their respective countries, and participate in educational workshops.

== Background ==
The precursor organization was the East African Library Association (EALA), which dissolved in the 1970s. Perceiving a remaining need for regional connection between library associations, even after an encompassing regional library association had not worked, Tucker Kigongo Lwanga, a member of the Kenya Library Association, first proposed the creation of SCESCAL in 1972.

Lwanga, along with Jafred Shalimba Musisi, Francis Otieno Pala, Isaac M. N. Kigongo-Bukenya, and Ellen Namhila are credited with putting on the first conference in Dar es Salaam, Tanzania in 1974. The organization began life with the name Standing Conference of Eastern and Central African Librarians (SCECAL), before changing slightly in 1977 to include information workers who were not necessarily librarians.

== Administration ==
They support library programs in aligning with the United Nations Sustainable Development Goals (SDGs).

Member organizations submit biennial country reports on the development of their national libraries, as well as proposals for regional initiatives, and other obligations. These reports are presented at the General Assembly of SCESCAL.

In October 2023, the organization's structure was re-adapted. The Secretariat is a position held by a member association and is currently held by the Eswatini Library Association.

The most recent constitution for guiding the organization was adopted by the SCECSAL General Council in 2024.

=== Chairperson of Organizing Committee ===
- 2010: Kgomotso Radijeng

== Members and partners ==
Member associations have had varying levels of participation, as well as different names over the years. Only organizations from the following nations are eligible for membership: Angola, Botswana, Burundi, Congo Republic, Democratic Republic of Congo, Djibouti, Eritrea, Eswatini, Ethiopia, Kenya, Lesotho, Malawi, Madagascar, Mauritius, Mozambique, Namibia, Rwanda, Seychelles, Somalia, South Africa, South Sudan, Sudan, Tanzania, Uganda, Zambia, and Zimbabwe.

=== Member associations ===
Name	Country	Joined	Years hosted	Ref.
Botswana Library Association	Botswana	1974	1986	
Kenya Library Association	Kenya	1974	1978, 1998, 2012, 2020, 2024	
Lesotho Library Association	Lesotho	1978	1980	
Malawi Library Association	Malawi	~1982	1982, 1994 and 2014	
National Information Workers Association of Namibia (NIWAN)	Namibia	~1998	2000, 2021	
Library and Information Association of South Africa (LIASA)	South Africa	2002	2002	
Eswatini Library and Information Association (ESWALA)	Eswatini	~1985	1988	
Tanzania Library and Information Association	Tanzania	1974	1974, 1992 and 2006	
Uganda Library and Information Association (ULIA)	Uganda	1974	1990, 2004 and 2018	
Library and Information Association of Zambia (LIAZ)	Zambia	1974	1976	
Zimbabwe Library Association (ZimLA)	Zimbabwe	1980	1984	

=== Partners ===
SCECSAL has collaborated with other associations. In 2022, the biennial conference was held in conjunction with the host's own original conference, the Library and Information Association of South Africa (LIASA)'s conference.

== Conference editions ==
Member associations host the conferences, and occasionally the conferences have been hosted in collaboration with other events.

SCECSAL Conference editions
Date	Edition	Location	Theme and notes	Ref.
1974	I	Dar es Salaam, Tanzania	Libraries and their impact on education, economics and culture in developing countries	
1976	II	Lusaka, Zambia	Libraries and information services as instruments of transition to the 21st century in Africa	
1978	III	Nairobi, Kenya	The development of information systems: an African approach	
8 - 13 December 1980	IV	Maseru, Lesotho	Book promotion and the sharing of resources in Africa	
1982	V	Blantyre, Malawi	Libraries for national development	
1984	VI	Harare, Zimbabwe	Information for national development	
1986	VII	Gaborone, Botswana	Libraries and literacy	
21 - 29 July 1988	VIII	Mbabane, Eswatini	Library and information services for the disadvantaged groups	
21 - 29 June 1990	IX	Kampala, Uganda	Bibliographic control in 1990's and beyond	
1992	X	Dar es Salaam, Tanzania	Improving access to information and knowledge for socio-economic and technological development in Africa	
1994	XI	Blantyre, Malawi	Libraries and freedom of Information	
9 - 13 December 1996	XII	Maseru, Lesotho	Libraries & information services in the 21st Century and beyond	
27 - 31 July 1998	XIII	Nairobi, Kenya	Information for sustainable development in the 21st Century	
10 - 15 April 2000	XIV	Windhoek, Namibia	Information 2000: a Vision for the SCECSAL region	
15 - 20 April 2002	XV	Johannesburg, South Africa	From Africa to the World - the globalisation of indigenous knowledge systems	
5 - 9 July 2004	XVI	Kampala, Uganda	Towards a knowledge society for African development	
10 - 14 July 2006	XVII	Dar es Salaam, Tanzania	Libraries as a bridge to an information and knowledge society in Eastern, Central and Southern Africa.	
15-18 July 2008	XVIII	Lusaka, Zambia	Libraries and information services towards the attainment of the Millennium Development Goals (MDGs)	
6 - 9 December 2010	XIX	Gaborone, Botswana	Enhancing democracy and good governance through effective information and knowledge services	
4 - 8 June 2012	XX	Nairobi, Kenya	Information for sustainable development in a digital environment	
28 July - 1 August 2014	XXI	Lilongwe, Malawi	Information and knowledge management as a driving force for socio-economic development in Africa	
25 - 29 April 2016	XXII	Ezulwini Valley, Eswatini	Digital transformation and the changing role of libraries and information centres in the sustainable development of Africa	
23 - 27 April 2018	XXIII	Entebbe, Uganda	Positioning library and information services to achieve sustainable development: innovations and partnerships; 50th anniversary.	
8 - 11 February 2021	XXIV	Windhoek, Namibia	Inclusive libraries and information services towards achieving prosperity for sustainable development; Postponed from 20–24 April 2020 due to the COVID-19 pandemic.	
4-7 October 2022	XXV	Johannessburg, South Africa	Against all odds: Resilience of libraries in a post-truth world - Reimagining, repurposing and rediscovering libraries in a post-truth world; Joint event with LIASA's Annual Conference.	
22-26 April 2024	XXVI	Mombasa, Kenya	Re-imagining library and information services in the digital era	
27 April - 1 May 2026	XXVII	Livingstone, Zambia	African Libraries and Information Services at the New Crossroads	
2028	XXVIII	Ezulwini Valley, Eswatini		

== Committees and programs ==
In 1986, a parliamentary librarian committee was formed among SCECSAL attendees. This group split off into the Association of Parliamentary Libraries in Eastern and Southern Africa (APLESA) in 1994.

== Awards and notable winners ==
=== SCESCAL Author of the Year Awards ===
==== Journal Articles/Chapters in Books Category ====
In 2002, the winners of the Journal Articles/Chapters in Books Category were Jenny Raubenheimer from the University of South Africa and John van Niekerk from the Medical University of South Africa.

In 2018, the winner of the Journal Articles/Chapters in Books Category was Jaya Raju from the University of Cape Town.

==== Books Category ====
In 2000, the winner of the Books Category was Maurice Lundu from Copperbelt University, for two books: The Library in the Service of Society: Philosophical Foundation (1995) and Political Economy of Information on Development, Democracy and Security in Southern Africa (1996).

In 2018, the winner of the Books Category was Maria Musoke from Makerere University, for her book titled Informed and Healthy: Theoretical and Applied Perspectives on the Value of Information to Health Care. 1st ed.

=== SCECSAL Best Conference Paper and Presenter Award ===
The award was first introduced in April 2000 at the XIV SCECSAL Conference in Windhoek, Namibia.

The winners in 2000 were Kingo Mchombu (University of Namibia), Charles B. M. Lungu (Copperbelt University), and Stephen Mudogo Mutula (University of Botswana).

The winners in 2002 were Justin Chisenga (Rand Afrikaans University), Andrew Kaniki (University of Natal), M. E. Kutu Mphahlele (University of the North), and Brught Nkhata (Harry Oppenheimer Okavango Research Centre at the University of Botswana).

The winners in 2018 were Chiku Mnubi Mchombu (Human Rights and Documentation Centre at the University of Namibia).

=== SCECSAL Excellence Awards ===
This award was created in 2018. The conference did not occur in-person in 2020, due to restrictions during the COVID-19 pandemic, and winners instead received their awards at the 2024 conference.

The 2018 winners were Tucker Kigongo Lwanga, Jafred Shalimba Musisi (posthumous), Maurice Chifwembe Lundu (posthumous), Isaac M. N. Kigongo-Bukenya (posthumous), and Dr. Justin Chisenga.

The 2020 winners were Dennis Ocholla, Jacina Were, and Nomsa Nqobile Victoria Mkhwanazi (posthumous).

The 2024 winners were Velenasi Mwale Munsanje and Maria Musoke.

The 2026 winner was Gladys Kemboi (University of Illinois Urbana-Champaign).

=== SCECSAL 50th Anniversary Awards ===
The 50th anniversary conference of SCECSAL was held in 2024, in Mombasa, Kenya, and presented special awards to people who had made significant contributions and represented their respective organization throughout the organizations' history.

SCECSAL Presidents Award went to the individuals who were in charge when their association had hosted an edition of conference for the first time. These included Dr. Helen Kay Raseroka, Ellen Namhila, and Ellen Tise.

The SCECSAL Recognition Award was presented to individuals who had made significant contributions to the growth and success to SCECSAL, specifically. These people were Stephen Mudogo Mutula, Dr. John Tsebe, Dr. Helen Kay Raseroka, and Kingo Mchombu.

The SCECSAL Hosts Award was presented to the Tanzania Library Association, the Kenya Library Association, the Malawi Library Association, and the Uganda Library Association for hosting the conference at least three times since its inception.

== See also ==
- List of library associations
- Library and information science
