= Isak Collijn =

National librarian (1875–1949)

Isak Gustaf Alfred Collijn (17 July 1875 – 28 March 1949) was a Swedish bibliographer and publisher.

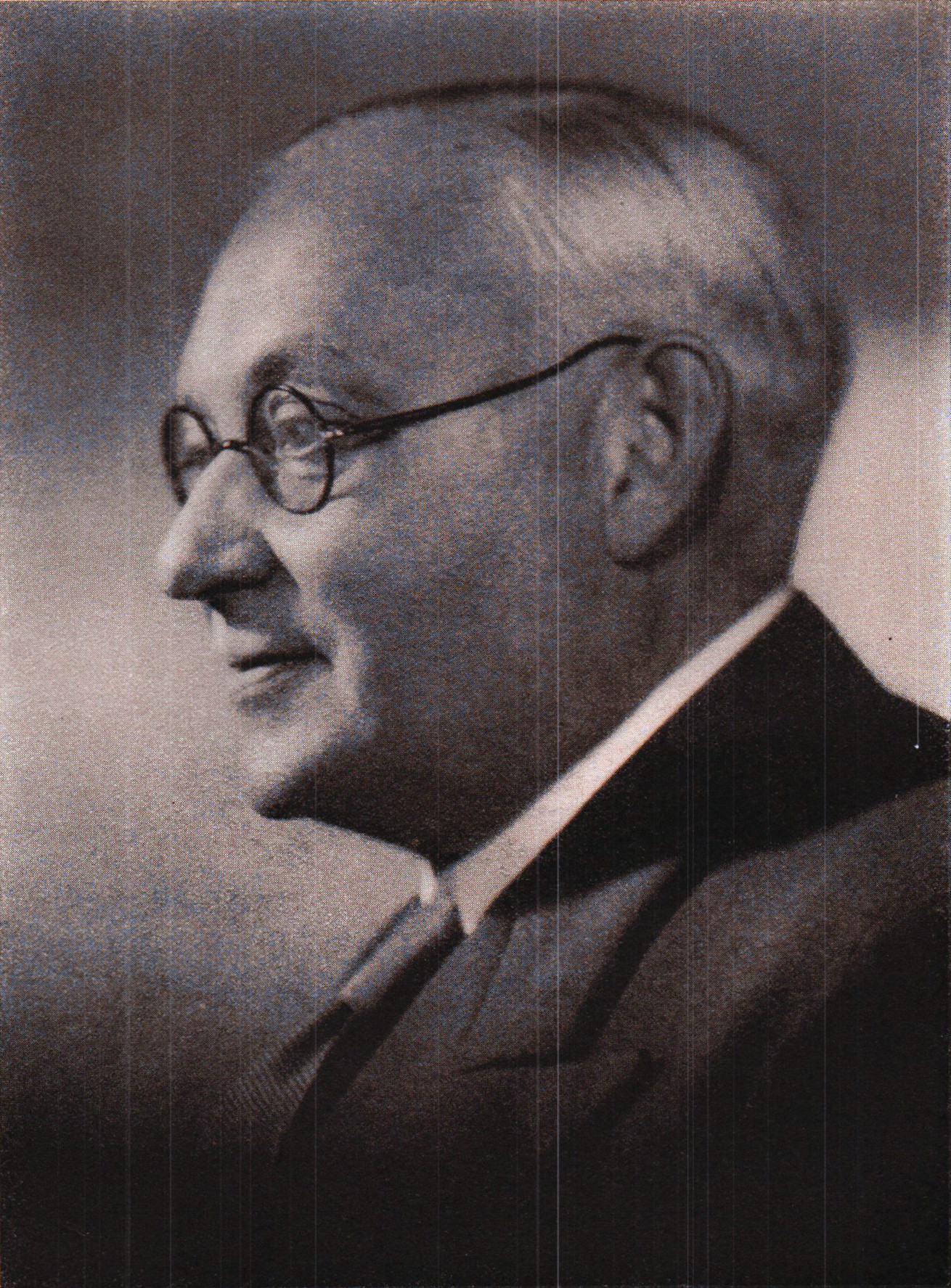
Isak Collijn

He enrolled as a student in 1893, and graduated with a degree in philosophy in 1902, with the treatise Les suffixes toponymiques dans les langues française et provençale. He was employed as a lecturer at Uppsala University in 1905, and as chief librarian at the same university in 1910. In 1914, Collijn commenced editing the librarians' periodical Nordisk tidsskrift för bok- och biblioteksväsen.

From 1927 to 1931, Collijn was President of the International Federation of Library Associations and Institutions.

He was a cousin of Ludvig Collijn.
