= Ellen Namhila =

Vice rector of the University of Namibia

Ellen Ndeshi Namhila (born 1964), is a librarian by profession, author and currently serving as a Pro-vice Chancellor of the University of Namibia for Administration, Finance and Resource Mobilisation. She is on a five-year leave of absence from her job as the head of the university's library.

== Life and career ==
In 1976, at the age of 12, Namhila endured an attack by the South African Defence Force in her home area. She was injured, as bullets went through her arms and legs. She was rescued to her home village, and later she fled to Angola and worked as a nurse in a SWAPO guerrilla camp.

She went to high school in Gambia, and pursued further studies in Finland, at the University of Tampere, where she studied information science. She graduated in 1993, and the title of her M.A. thesis was Rural development communication in Namibia: an Owambo case study. Later, in 2015, she defended her doctoral thesis in Tampere. The title of her thesis was Recordkeeping and missing "Native estate" records in Namibia: an investigation of colonial gaps in a post-colonial national archive.

As the vice rector of UNAM, she is responsible e.g. for human resources, economy and information technology and the buildings of the university.

== Books published ==
In 1997, she published a book titled The Price of Freedom, which is a story of an escape from a violence that ruptured a child's sense that adults provide security, of an education obtained in The Gambia and Finland, of how friends and leaders in the camps replaced her extended family. The price of freedom is Ellen's autobiography of her journey as a refugee and a returner to her newly independent country. This book has been used in the University of Namibia for the English Access for years. In 2005, she again published a book titled "Kaxumba KaNdola" which is a biography of Namibian political activist and founding member of SWAPO. In 2009 she published Tears of Courage: Five Mothers Five Stories One Victory.

== Awards, honors and recognition ==
- Ellen won a Mbapira award in 1997 for the Price of Freedom book and also another Mbapira award in 1998 for writing Kaxumba Kandola Man and Myth.
- This year (2024), Prof. Ellen Ndeshi Namhila was recognized for her pivotal role of hosting the first SCECSAL Conference of 2000 which was held in Namibia. Furthermore, this award was in recognition of the significant contributions made to the growth and expansion of SCECSAL in Namibia.
