= South African Journal of Libraries and Information Science =

- Discipline: Library and information science
- Language: English
- Edited by: Rocky Ralebipi-Simela

Publication details
- Former names: South African Libraries; South African Journal for Librarianship and Information Science; South African Journal of Library and Information Science
- History: 2002–present
- Publisher: Library and Information Association of South Africa (South Africa)
- Frequency: Biannual
- Open access: Yes
- License: CC BY-SA 4.0

Standard abbreviations
- ISO 4: S. Afr. j. libr. inf. sci.

Indexing
- ISSN: 0256-8861 (print); 2304-8263 (web)
- LCCN: 92649493
- OCLC no.: 646623854

Links
- Journal homepage

The South African Journal of Libraries and Information Science is a biannual academic journal of the Library and Information Association of South Africa. It has been published since 2002.

== Former names ==
- South African Libraries (ISSN 0038-240X), from 1933
- South African Journal for Librarianship and Information Science, from 1972
- South African Journal of Library and Information Science, from 1984
- The South African Journal of Libraries and Information Science (ISSN 0256-8861), from 1988 to 2002
