= Peter Johan Lor =

Dutch librarian and library scientist (1946-)

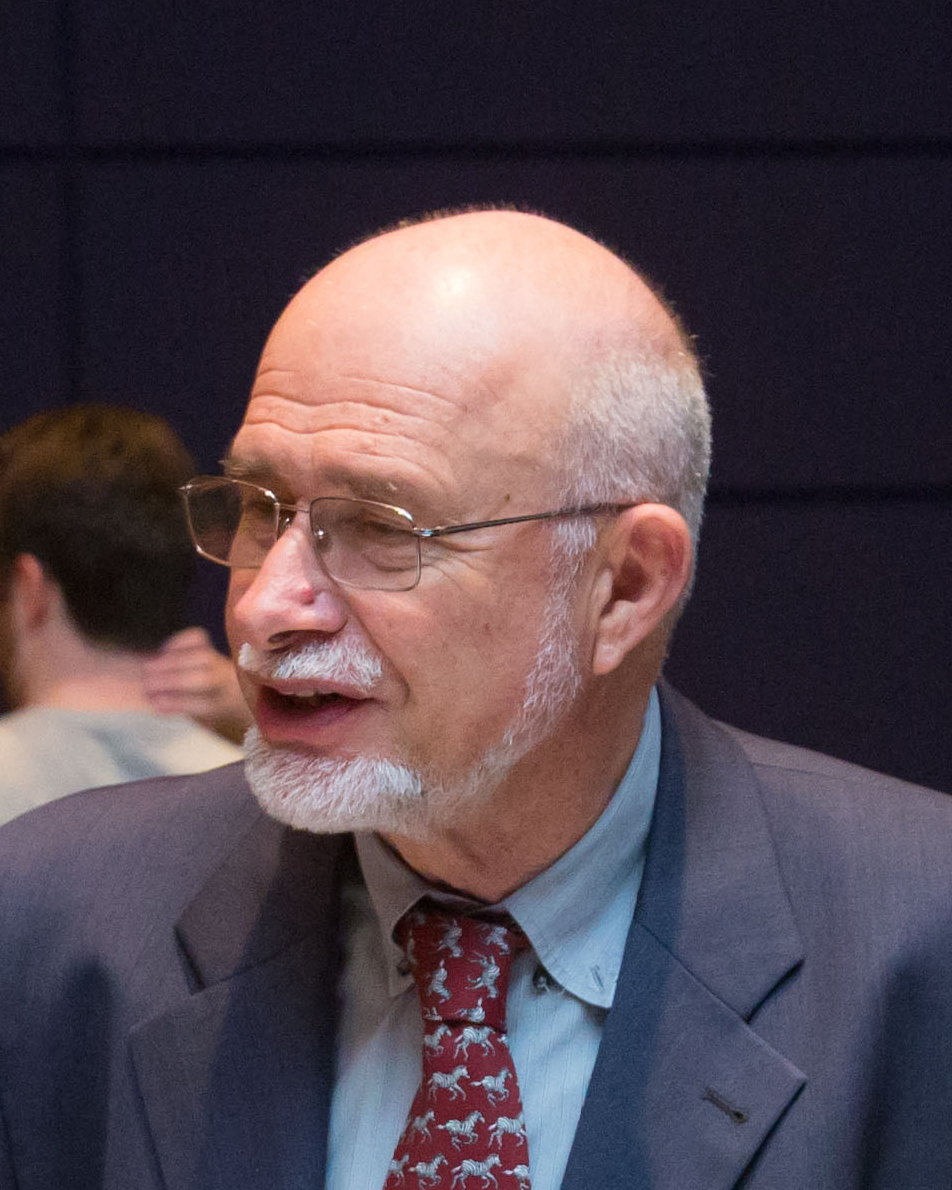
- Born: 1946 (age 79–80); Netherlands
- Education: University of Pretoria; University of Stellenbosch; University of Caen

Peter Johan Lor is a South African librarian and library and information science scholar specialising in international librarianship.

He was the Director of the State Library in Pretoria from 1992 and served as the first National Librarian and Chief Executive Officer of the National Library of South Africa from 2000 to 2003 following the consolidation of the State Library (Pretoria) and South African Library in 1999. He was Secretary General of the International Federation of Library Associations and Institutions from 2005 to 2008. He served as an Extraordinary Professor in the Department of Information Science, University of Pretoria from 1998 to 2016.

== Career ==
Lor was born in the Netherlands in 1946 and emigrated to South Africa in 1952. He completed studies in Librarianship and Library Science at the University of Stellenbosch and the University of Pretoria in South Africa and at the University of Caen in France. He received an Honours degree in Library Science from the University of Stellenbosch as well as a Masters in Library Science from the University of Pretoria. He earned a D.Phil. in Library and Information Science from the University of Pretoria in 1990.

As a librarian, Lor served in various libraries in South Africa as well as holding the position of senior librarian at the University of Pretoria (1976–80). Lor was director of the South African State Library for eight years. In 1999, the National Library of South Africa was created by merging the State Library in Pretoria and the South African Library in Cape Town. Lor became the first National Librarian.

Lor was active in the creation of the Library and Information Association of South Africa. This association replaced former library associations that had been segregated along racial lines. He was involved in developing national library policies for post-apartheid South Africa.

In addition to his active role in founding the Library and Information Association of South Africa (LIASA) in its early years (1996–2000), Lor served in a variety of capacities in other organizations such as the International Federation of Library Associations and Institutions (IFLA) and the Conference of Directors of National Libraries (CDNL).

Lor was Secretary General of IFLA from 2005–2008. He has also served as a consultant on library development and has worked as an advocate for libraries as a participant at the World Summit on the Information Society.

== Teaching ==
Lor was associate professor and then a professor in Information Science at the University of South Africa (1986–1992). He has also taught at the University of Pretoria in the Department of Information Science. He held a visiting professor appointment at the University of Wisconsin-Milwaukee in the School of Information Studies from 2009–2011. From 1998 to 2016 he was an Extraordinary Professor in the Department of Information Science, University of Pretoria.

== Publications ==
Peter Lor is the author of over 150 professional and research publications. In 2019 his book, International and Comparative Librarianship: a Thematic Approach was published as part of the IFLA series, Global Studies in Library and Information.

Lor's research interests include:

- Developmental role of libraries in developing countries
- National and regional information policy
- Library and information services legislation
- Information flows between developed and developing countries
- International and comparative librarianship and information work
- National digital heritage: capturing, organization, preservation and access
- Research methods in library and information science

Selected publications:

- Lor, Peter Johan (2024). "Continuity and change in West African librarianship: revisiting Mary Niles Maack's research in Senegal and the region". Library Trends. 72 (3): 525–546. doi:10.1353/lib.2024.a944678.
- Lor, P. J. (2024). "Librarianship and bibliography in the international arena: The Subcommittee for Bibliography of the International Committee on Intellectual Cooperation, 1922–1930." IFLA Journal. https://doi.org/10.1177/03400352241236718
- Lor, P.J. (2023). "Scholarly publishing and peer review in the Global South: the role of the reviewer." JLIS.it 14(1):10-29.
- Lor, P.J. (2023). Ludwig Jahn’s walkway: Librarians between past and future.” In Guardando oltre i confini: partire dalla tradizione per costruire il futuro delle biblioteche. Studi e testimonianze per i 70 anni di Mauro Guerrini, edited by Giovanni Bergamin and Tiziana Possemato, 219–29. Rome: Associazione Italiana Biblioteche.
- Lor, P.J., Wiles, J.B. & Britz, J.J. (2021). Re-thinking information ethics: truth, conspiracy theories, and librarians in the Covid-19 era. Libri 71:1.
- Lor, Peter Johan (2019). International and comparative librarianship: Concepts and methods for global studies. Berlin; Boston: De Gruyter Saur. pp. xliv, 905. ISBN 978-3-11-026791-4.
- Lor, Peter Johan (2019). "What were librarians doing while Otlet was inventing documentation? The modernization and professionalization of librarianship during the Belle Époque". JLIS.it. 10 (3): 133–147. doi:10.4403/jlis.it-12566.
- Lor, Peter Johan. (2018). “Democracy, Information, and Libraries in a Time of Post-Truth Discourse.” Library Management 39 (5): 307–21.
- Lor, Peter Johan. (2015). “Understanding Innovation and Policy Transfer: Implications for Libraries and Information Services in Africa.” Library Trends 64 (1): 84–111.
- Lor, Peter Johan. (2014). “Revitalizing Comparative Library and Information Science: Theory and Metatheory.” Journal of Documentation 70 (1): 25–51.
- Lor, Peter Johan. (2012). “The IFLA–UNESCO Partnership 1947–2012.” IFLA Journal 38 (4): 269–82.
- Lor, Peter Johan. (2008). “IFLA, the World Summit on the Information Society, and After.” Alexandria 20 (1): 11–21.
- Lor, Peter Johan. (2007). “Bridging the North-South Divide in Scholarly Communication in Africa - a Library and Information Systems Perspective.” IFLA Journal 33 (4): 303–12.
- Lor, Peter Johan and Johannes Britz. (2005). “Knowledge Production from an African Perspective: International Information Flows and Intellectual Property.” The International information & library review 37.2 (2005): 61–76.
- Lor, Peter Johan, Paul van Helden, and Theo J. D. Bothma. (2005). And (2005). “Developing a GIS-Based Inventory of South Africa’s Public Libraries: The Public and Community Libraries Inventory of South Africa (PaCLISA) Project.” South African Journal of Libraries & Information Science 71 (3): 268–74.
- Lor, Peter Johan. (2000). “Libraries in the African Renaissance: African Experience and Prospects for Survival in the Information Age.” International Information & Library Review 32 (2): 213–36.
- Lor, P.J. (1997). Guidelines for legislation for national library services; prepared by Peter Johan Lor with the assistance of Elizabeth A.S. Sonnekus for the General Information Programme and UNISIST. Paris: UNESCO. (CII-97/WS/7) Available: http://www.unesco.org/webworld/nominations/guidelines1_h.htm and http://archive.ifla.org/VII/s1/gnl/.
- Lor, Peter Johan (1996). "A distant mirror: the story of libraries in South Africa". Daedalus. 125 (4): 235–265.

== Awards ==
In 2008, Lor was awarded an Honorary Doctorate of Philosophy from the University of Pretoria for his extraordinary professional work in different associations and as a professor and researcher in Library Science.

- 2008 - DPhil (honoris causa)
- 2014. IFLA Medal (for distinguished service to IFLA and substantial contribution to the global library field).
- 2020 - 2020 John Ames Humphry/OCLC/Forest Press Award
