= Barbara Lison =

German librarian

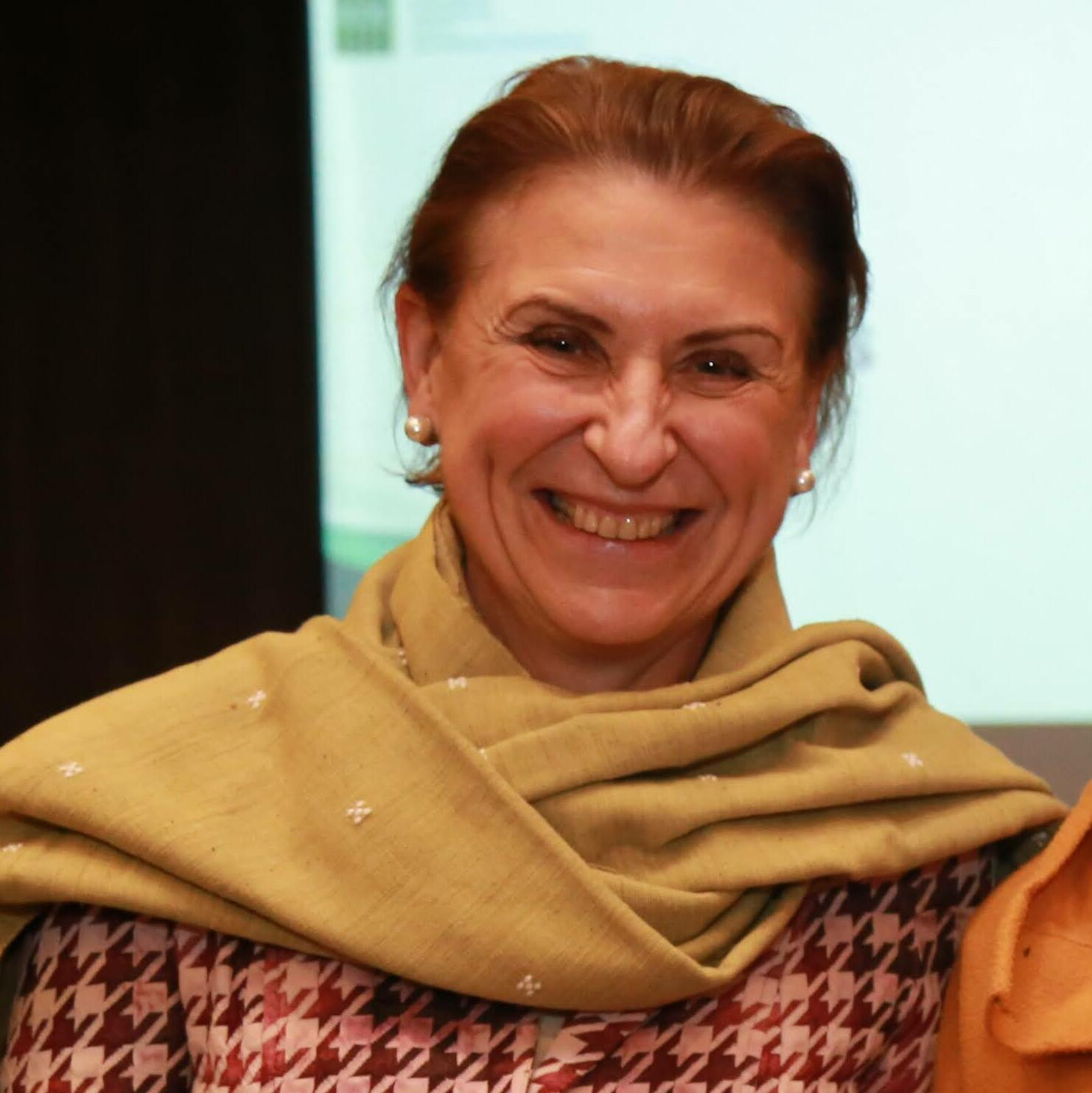
- in 2022
- Born: 2 October 1956 (age 70); Zbrosławice
- Education: Ruhr University Bochum
- Occupation: Librarian
- Employer: Bremen City Libraries
- Known for: International Federation of Library Associations and Institutions (IFLA)'s President
- Successor: Vicki McDonald

Barbara Lison (born 2 October 1956) is a German librarian. She has led the Bremen public library service for thirty years. She was President of the International Federation of Library Associations and Institutions (IFLA) from 2021 to 2023 stressing the topics sustainability, open-access and fair copyright.

== Life ==
Lison was born in Zbrosławice in Poland in 1956. She studied Slavic studies, history and educational science at Ruhr University Bochum. She initially taught Russian in Düsseldorf followed by a teacher traineeship in Düsseldorf and then by a library traineeship in Bochum and Oldenburg while studying LIS at the University of Applied Sciences in Cologne. In 1986 she worked as head of the information department at the Federal Institute for Industrial Health and Safety Standards in Dortmund.

In 1987 she was appointed to lead the city library in Oldenburg. In 1992 she became director of Bremen Public Library. There are nine branch libraries in Bremen.

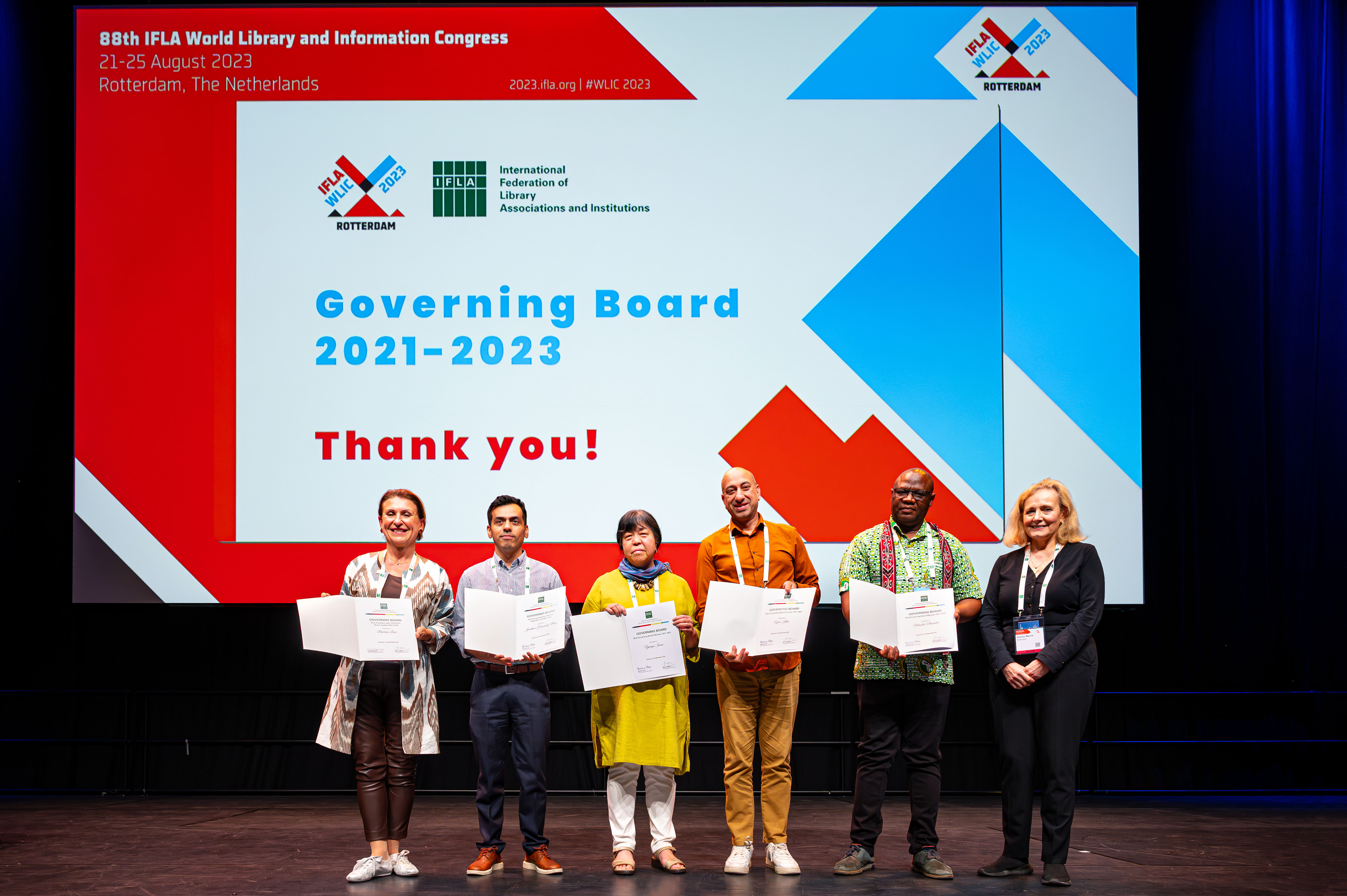
IFLA WLIC 2023 Closing Session. Barbara Lison on the left - published with an open access license

She initially became involved with the IFLA while organising a successful bid to host the World Library and Information Congress in Berlin in 2003.

In 2016 she became the Deutscher Bibliotheksverband's President for three years. After about twenty years of involvement with IFLA, including being the treasurer, she was elected IFLA President-elect in 2019. Between 2021 and 2023 she was IFLA President. She had already been involved with a free e-lending scheme and her focus points included sustainability, open-access and fair copyright. She was succeeded by Vicki McDonald

In an interview she said her favourite book was Roald Dahl's Matilda because it told the story of a girl who succeeds with the aid of a teacher and a librarian.

== Awards ==
In 2022 she was given the Order of Merit of the Federal Republic of Germany.
