= South African Library Week =

The national celebration of South Africa Library Week (SALW) is one of the key milestones of the Library and Information Association of South Africa (LIASA). LIASA was formed in 1997 in response to the need to unify a historically divided library profession that was also affected by the former apartheid policies of South Africa.

From 2003 LIASA spearheaded a campaign to ensure that a national library week was observed by the entire library and information services (LIS) sector as an opportunity to raise the profile of libraries in South Africa especially amongst previously disadvantaged communities. This campaign has now resulted in South African Library Week (SALW) being recognized by government as a commemorative period on par with Water Week etc. when all types of libraries across the country use it as an opportunity to market their services to their users, the broader community, civil society and decision makers. It is hoped that these efforts would contribute to the understanding of the important role that libraries play in a democratic society, advancing literacy, making the basic human right of freedom of access to information a reality, and inculcating tolerance and respect among all South Africans. During this period LIASA aims to make all South Africans aware that libraries contribute to nation building and improve the quality of life of all who use them.

== History ==
The customary celebration of library week exists in many countries. Such a tradition had been celebrated for some years in South Africa, mainly in the public library sector and spearheaded by the various Provincial Library Services. It was customary to celebrate this during the last two weeks of May. However, it is LIASA's vision to celebrate a truly inclusive Library Week across the entire country, one that will embrace all types of libraries and all kinds of users and potential users. To achieve this, LIASA spearheads all campaigns in its 10 branches in all nine provinces and decides on the annual theme and slogan for the week.

The former Department of Arts, Culture, Science and Technology approved the name South African Library Week, abbreviated to SALW in 2001 and that this week is to be celebrated during the week of the 20th of March. This is a significant date in South African Library history and a significant week for democracy n South Africa for the following reasons:

- The South African Public Library, now known as the National Library of South Africa (Cape Town) was the first library to be established in South Africa. This was done by a government proclamation on 20 March 1818. The South African Library in fact started off as a true public library and has established itself as a pioneering institution in South African library history.
- The date establishes a firm link between libraries and democracy as South Africa celebrates Human Rights Day on 21 March. The South African Constitution established access to information as a basic human right.

The celebration of SALW aims to create an understanding of the importance of libraries and the vital role libraries play in a democratic society.

This week is now strongly supported by the Department of Arts and Culture who oversee the development of public and community libraries in all nine provinces. School libraries and higher education libraries are under the purview of the Department of Basic Education and Department of Higher Education and Training respectively.

== The First SALW ==
Although LIASA celebrated SALW as early as 2000, during 18 to 23 March 2002 LIASA organized the first very successful SALW that was celebrated in all types of libraries nationwide with the slogan ""Free your mind - Read!" as supported and renamed by a democratic South African government.

The announcements of the dates and slogan for the Week were widely publicised in 2001. Letters were sent to the Department of Arts, Culture, Science and Technology, the national Department of Education as well as the MEC's of the nine provinces responsible for libraries. All warmly welcomed the initiative.

SALW 2002 was launched in Etwatwa (Daveyton) and each branch organized an event in their region. Institutions across the country also staged activities to celebrate the Week.

It is the Association's dream that South African Library Week will become a celebration of the country's intellectual and cultural heritage.

== Themes to date ==
- 15-26 May. Reach the world @ your library
- 14-25 May 2001. African Renaissance through Libraries
- 18–23 March 2002. Free your Mind - Read!
- 17–22 March 2003. Your Right to Read
- 15–20 March 2004. 1994-2004: Libraries in a Decade of Democracy
- 14–18 March 2005. Libraries: opening the doors of learning and culture to all
- 13–18 March 2006. Libraries: partners in learning, nation building and development
- 19–23 March 2007. Libraries: your key to the future
- 17–22 March 2008. From local to global @ your library
- 16–21 March 2009. Access for all @ your library
- 22–27 March 2010. Reading changes lives
- 19–26 March 2011. Read in your language @ your library
- 17–24 March 2012. Develop @ your library
- 16–23 March 2013. Educate yourself @ your library
- 17–23 March 2014. Celebrating Libraries in 20 Years of Democracy: Check in @ your library
- 14–23 March 2015. Connect @ your library
- 11-21 March 2016. #libraries4lifelonglearning
- 18-26 March 2017. My Library Your Library
- 19-25 March 2018. Libraries: Heart of the Community
- 18-24 march 2019. Collaborate @ Your Library
- 16-22 March 2020. Libraries: Your partners for life
- 15-21 March 2021. Libraries Matter!
- 14-20 March 2022. ReImagine! RePurpose! ReDiscover ... Libraries!
- 20-26 March 2023. Libraries: telling powerful stories!
- 18-24 March 2024. Libraries Foster Social Cohesion
- 17-23 March 2025. Libraries for Sustainable Communities
- 16-22 March 2026. Reclaiming Knowledge, Empowering Futures

== Promoting SALW ==
LIASA has since taken the responsibility of commissioning promotional media designed to popularize the dates and theme. This includes posters, bookmarks, T-shirts, caps, book bags, newspaper adverts, etc. These are widely distributed to all its branches for further distribution to all types of libraries in their regions.

The LIASA President is regularly interviewed by national television and regional radio stations on the significance of the theme as well as the importance of libraries for developing an informed nation. The Minister of Arts & Culture is often the keynote speaker at the official launch events held on the Saturday before the week-long activities.

LIASA strongly believes that through such campaigns, libraries may be taken more seriously and accorded its rightful role in partnering education and development in South Africa
