= Claudia Lux =

German librarian (born 1950)

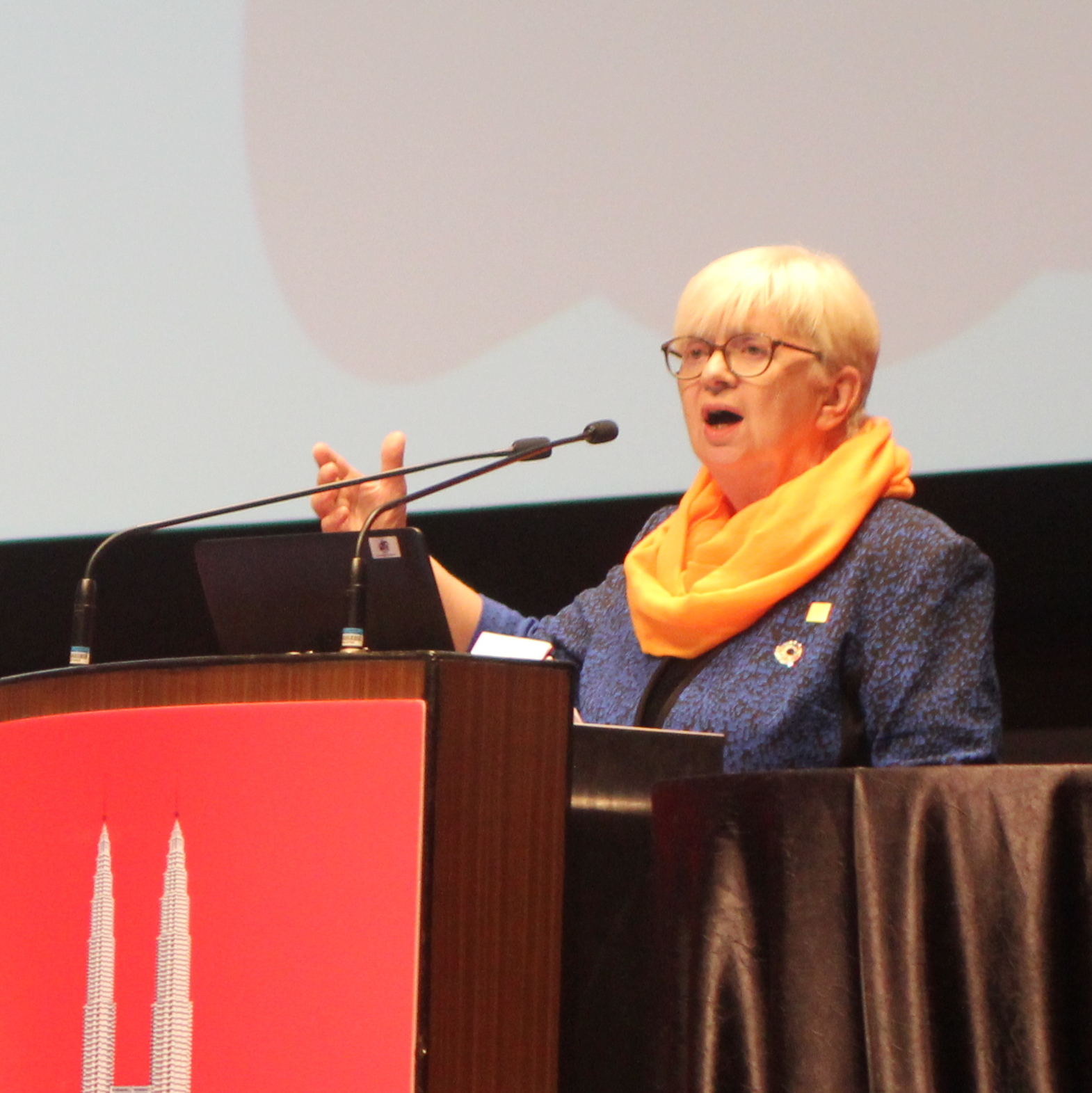
- Claudia Lux in Kuala Lumpur in 2018
- Born: 24 March 1950 (age 76); Gladbeck, Germany
- Education: Ruhr University Bochum (Ph.D.)
- Occupation: Librarian
- Scientific career
- Workplaces: Berlin State Library; Senate Library; Central and Regional Library Berlin; German Library Association; IFLA; Library and Information Sciences Institute at Humboldt University in Berlin; Qatar National Library

Claudia Lux (born 24 March 1950 in Gladbeck, Germany) is a German librarian and the Member of the National Committee of International Federation of Library Associations and Institutions.

== Life and education ==
After studying social sciences, Lux received her Ph.D. in sinology in 1985 at Ruhr University Bochum. She started to work as a sinologist at the State Library.

She worked in the East Asia Department of the Berlin State Library and participated in a number of research projects. She became the director of the Senate Library and in 1997 director-general of the Central and Regional Library Berlin.

From 1995 to 2004 she became the chair of the German Library Association and a member of the National Committee of IFLA. From 2007 to 2009, she was elected president of the International Federation of Library Associations and Institutions (IFLA). She was the successor of Alex Byrne and after Gustav Hofmann and Hans-Peter Geh, Lux was the third German, who held this office. Lux has been Honorary Professor of the Library and Information Sciences Institute at Humboldt University in Berlin since 2006.

In April 2012 Lux left her position as the director-general of the Central and Regional Library Berlin and moved to Qatar. She worked as the Project Director at Qatar National Library in Qatar.

== Works ==
- The political-economic decision-making process in China in 1937-1945 (Bochum, 1986) ISBN 3-88339-495-5
- The library system of the People's Republic of China (Munich 1986) ISBN 3-598-21127-9
- Fees in libraries (with Günter Beyersdorff, Berlin, 1988) ISBN 3-87068-876-9
- Teaching library in Deutschland (Wiesbaden, 2004) ISBN 3-934997-11-2

== See also ==
- Qatar National Library
