= Library and Information Association of South Africa =

Library organization in South Africa

- Abbreviation: LIASA
- Formation: 1997
- Type: Library Association
- Purpose: To connect and represent professionals in the library and information services (LIS) sector and to promote development in South Africa through information access.
- Headquarters: 228 Johannes Ramokhoase Street (previously Proes Street), Pretoria (Annex to the National Library of South Africa)
- Location: Pretoria, South Africa
- Region served: South Africa
- Members: 1,590 (2023)
- Official language: English
- President: Charlie Molepo
- Website: www.liasa.org.za

The Library and Information Association of South Africa (LIASA) is a professional non-profit organisation representing institutions and people working in libraries and information services in South Africa. As a professional body, LIASA is officially recognised by the South African Qualifications Authority (SAQA), with its recognition renewed until March 2030. The association's membership grew to 1,590 in 2023, an increase of 22% from the previous year. The LIASA National Office is located on the Pretoria campus of the National Library of South Africa (NLSA).

== History ==
=== Background and Unification ===
Prior to 1997, the library and information services (LIS) sector in South Africa was fragmented. The two largest organisations were the South African Institute for Librarianship and Information Science (SAILIS) and the African Library Association of South Africa (ALASA). SAILIS had been formed in 1979 as a professional graduate body and required formal qualifications for membership, while other organisations like the Library and Information Workers' Organization (LIWO), launched in July 1990, were created in opposition to what they viewed as elitist membership criteria.

The process toward unification began in January 1995 during the Conference on Libraries and Information Services in Developing South Africa (LISDESA), leading to the election of the first Steering Committee for the Unification of Library and Information Stakeholders (ULIS). The first ULIS conference (ULIS-1) was held in Johannesburg from 8–10 July 1996, where then-Deputy President Thabo Mbeki urged the more than 250 participants to unite.

=== Formation of LIASA ===
An Interim Executive Committee (IEC) was elected and mandated to draft a constitution. Supported by Provincial Support Groups (PSGs) from all nine provinces, the IEC organised the Constituent Conference (ULIS-2) at the University of Pretoria. The conference took place in July 1997 with approximately 450 library and information workers attending. The primary focus was to debate and approve the draft constitution. After delegates discussed and proposed amendments, the final draft was accepted unanimously, and the name "Library and Information Association of South Africa" was chosen. The acronym LIASA is pronounced "liyasa," which means "the dawning" in the Nguni languages. A Transitional Executive Committee (TEC) was elected to manage the new association and organise the first annual conference in November 1998.

Peter Johan Lor, South Africa's first National Librarian (2000–2003) and a former IFLA Secretary General (2005–2008), is listed as the first member of LIASA.

== Governance and Structure ==
In 2024, LIASA implemented a new governance model, replacing its former Representative Council and Executive Committee with a Board structure following constitutional amendments.

Prior to this change, the association was governed by a Representative Council and an Executive Committee. The Representative Council included five elected officials (President, President-Elect, Secretary, Treasurer and Public Relations Officer), branch and interest group chairs, and publication editors.

=== Branches and Interest Groups ===
LIASA has 10 branches: one in each of the nine provinces and a second in Gauteng. Each branch has an elected committee and arranges its own meetings and functions. The association also maintains 10 Interest Groups that serve as platforms for members to discuss various areas of specialisation.

=== Membership ===
Membership categories include Individual, Student, Unemployed, Pensioner, Intern, Professional Librarian, and Institutional Member.

== Professional Recognition ==
LIASA is recognised by the South African Qualifications Authority (SAQA) as a professional body (Reg. ID: 920). Through this authority, LIASA confers the designation of "Professional Librarian" (Designation ID: 572) upon members who meet the required educational and professional standards. In 2023, 242 members were awarded this designation, including 37 new registrations.

== International Achievements ==
The International Federation of Library Associations and Institutions (IFLA), of which LIASA is a member association, invites bids from countries to host its annual World Library and Information Congress. LIASA has twice successfully hosted the event:

- IFLA 2007 – LIASA hosted the 73rd IFLA General Conference and Council in Durban, South Africa.
- IFLA/WLIC 2015 – LIASA hosted the IFLA World Library and Information Congress in Cape Town, South Africa.

Additionally, former LIASA president Ellen Tise served as IFLA President from 2009 to 2011, with the presidential theme "Libraries Driving Access to Knowledge (A2K)".

== Annual Conference ==
The LIASA Conference is held annually during September or October. Since 2011, the conference has rotated between Durban, Cape Town, and the Johannesburg/Pretoria area. The conference is a venue for members to showcase best practices, learn about national and international trends, and meet with experts.

In 2022, the LIASA Conference was held in conjunction with the XXVI SCECSAL Conference in Johannessburg, South Africa.

== South African Library Week (SALW) ==
In 2001, LIASA was tasked with initiating a national week to raise the profile of libraries. Following research, it was decided that the week in which 20 March falls would be designated as South African Library Week. The date commemorates the 1818 government proclamation that established the first public library, the South African Public Library (now the National Library of South Africa's Cape Town Campus). The week also aligns with South Africa's Human Rights Day on 21 March.

== Awards and recognition ==
=== SALI Trust Grants ===
The South African Library and Information (SALI) Trust was established after the dissolution of SAILIS. The trust offers annual grants, with a maximum value of R40,000 each, for research and development in the LIS field.

=== SALI Trust - LIASA Lifetime Achievement Award ===
This award recognizes individuals for their long-term contributions to the LIS sector. Recent recipients include:

- Naomi Haasbroek (2024)
- Ellen Tise (2023)
- Peter Johan Lor (2022)

== Presidents ==
The President of LIASA serves a two-year term. The following is a list of current and past presidents:

- 2024–2027 Charlie Molepo
- 2021–2023 Nazeem Hardy
- 2018–2021 Nikki Crowster
- 2016–2018 Mandla Ntombela
- 2014–2016 Segametsi Molawa
- 2012–2014 Ujala Satgoor
- 2010–2012 Naomi Haasbroek
- 2008–2010 Rachel More
- 2004–2008 Tommy Matthee
- 2002–2004 Robert Moropa
- 2000–2002 Ellen Tise
- 1998–2000 Ellen Tise

== Publications ==
LIASA has two official publications:

- South African Journal of Libraries and Information Science (SAJLIS): An open access, peer-reviewed, and accredited journal published twice a year. It has roots dating to 1933 when it was published as South African Libraries (ISSN 0038-240X). The journal is published under a Creative Commons Attribution-ShareAlike 4.0 International License.
- LIASA-in-Touch: The official magazine, published four times per year.
