= IFLA World Library and Information Congress =

The World Library and Information Congress (WLIC) is an international conference held annually by the International Federation of Library Associations and Institutions (IFLA) for the library and information services sector. It brings together over 3,500 participants from more than 120 countries. It sets the international agenda for the library profession and offers opportunities for networking and professional development. The congress also offers an international trade exhibition.

Each year a new library can become "The Public Library of the Year" and it is announced to congress. Missoula Public Library was a recent winner.

== List of WLIC host cities ==
- 2026: 10–13 August, Busan, Republic of Korea
- 2025: 18–22 August, Astana, Kazakhstan
- 2024: 19–23 August, Dubai, United Arab Emirates – cancelled
- 2023: 19–25 August, Rotterdam, The Netherlands
- 2022: 26–29 July, Dublin, Ireland
- 2021: 17–19 August, Virtual Conference
- 2019: 24–30 August, Athens, Greece
- 2018: 24–30 August, Kuala Lumpur, Malaysia
- 2017: 19–25 August, Wrocław, Poland
- 2016: 13–19 August, Columbus, Ohio, United States of America
- 2015: 17–23 August, Cape Town, South Africa
- 2014: 16–22 August, Lyon, France
- 2013: 17–23 August, Singapore
- 2012: 11–17 August, Helsinki, Finland
- 2011: 13–18 August, San Juan, Puerto Rico
- 2010: 10–15 August, Gothenburg, Sweden
- 2009: 23–27 August, Milan, Italy
- 2008: 10–14 August Quebec, Canada
- 2007: 19–23 August, Durban, South Africa
- 2006: 20–24 August, Seoul, Korea
- 2005: 14–18 August, Oslo, Norway
- 2004: 22–27 August, Buenos Aires, Argentina
- 2003: 1–9 August, Berlin, Germany
- 2002: 18–24 August, Glasgow, Scotland
- 2001: 16–25 August, Boston, US
- 2000: 13–18 August, Jerusalem, Israel
- 1999: 20–28 August, Bangkok, Thailand
- 1998: 16–21 August, Amsterdam, The Netherlands
- 1997: Copenhagen
- 1996: Beijing
- 1995: Istanbul
- 1994: Havana
- 1993: Barcelona
- 1992: New Delhi
- 1991: Moscow
- 1990: Stockholm
- 1989: Paris
- 1988: Sydney
- 1987: Brighton
- 1986: Tokyo
- 1985: Chicago
- 1984: Nairobi
- 1983: Munich
- 1982: Montreal
- 1981: Leipzig
- 1980: Manila
- 1979: Copenhagen
- 1978: Strbské Pleso
- 1977: Brussels
- 1976: Lausanne
- 1975: Oslo
- 1974: Washington
- 1973: Grenoble
- 1972: Budapest
- 1971: Liverpool
- 1970: Moscow
- 1969: Copenhagen
- 1968: Frankfurt am Main
- 1967: Toronto
- 1966:The Hague
- 1965: Helsinki
- 1964: Rome
- 1963: Sofia
- 1962: Berne
- 1961: Edinburgh
- 1960: Lund and Malmö
- 1959: Warsaw
- 1958: Madrid
- 1957: Paris
- 1956: Munich
- 1955: Brussels
- 1954: Zagreb
- 1953: Vienna
- 1952: Copenhagen
- 1951: Rome
- 1950: London
- 1949: Basel
- 1948: London
- 1947: Oslo
- 1939: The Hague and Amsterdam
- 1938: Brussels
- 1937: Paris
- 1936: Warsaw
- 1935: Madrid and Barcelona
- 1934: Madrid
- 1933: Chicago and Avignon
- 1932: Berne
- 1931: Cheltenham
- 1930: Stockholm
- 1929: Rome, Florence, and Venice
- 1928: Rome
