= International Federation of Library Associations and Institutions =

Organization of libraries

International Federation of Library Associations and Institutions (IFLA)
- Established: 1927; 99 years ago
- Type: International nongovernmental organization
- Location: Prins Willem-Alexanderhof 5, The Hague, Netherlands
- President: Leslie Weir
- Secretary General: Sharon Memis
- Website: www.ifla.org

The International Federation of Library Associations and Institutions (IFLA) is an international body that represents the interests of library users and information professionals. Founded in Scotland in 1927, IFLA operates as a non-governmental, not-for-profit organization with its headquarters located at the National Library of the Netherlands in The Hague.

IFLA sponsors the annual IFLA World Library and Information Congress, an event dedicated to promoting access to information, ideas, and works of imagination. This initiative is centered on the tenets of social, educational, cultural, democratic, and economic empowerment. IFLA also produces several publications, including the peer-reviewed IFLA Journal, which disseminates research and best practices in the field of library and information science.

IFLA partners with UNESCO, resulting in several jointly produced manifestos. IFLA is also a founding member of Blue Shield, which works to protect the world's cultural heritage when threatened by wars and natural disasters.

== History ==
2011 IFLA meeting in KB in the Hague

IFLA was founded in Edinburgh, Scotland, on 30 September 1927, when library associations from 14 European countries and the United States signed a resolution at the celebration of the 50th anniversary of the Library Association of the United Kingdom. Isak Collijn, head of the National Library of Sweden, was elected the first president. The first constitution was approved in Rome in 1929 during the World Congress of Librarianship and Bibliography.

During the 1930s the first library associations from outside Europe and the US joined: China, India, Japan, Mexico and the Philippines. By 1958 membership had grown to 64 associations from 42 countries. A permanent secretariat was established in 1962. By 1970 there were 250 members from 52 countries. The secretariat was moved to The Hague in 1971. By 1974 IFLA membership stood at 600 members in 100 countries.

Membership criteria were expanded beyond library associations in 1976 to include institutions, i.e. libraries, library schools and bibliographic institutes. At this time, the word Institutions was added to the organisation's name. Since then further new categories of membership have been created, including personal affiliates.

IFLA has now grown to over 1,700 members in approximately 155 countries. It is headquartered in the Koninklijke Bibliotheek, the National Library of the Netherlands, in The Hague.

In 2021 for the first time, IFLA held World Library and Information Congress (WLIC) online because of the continuing global pandemic.

IFLA's objectives are:

- To represent librarianship in matters of international interest
- To promote the continuing education of library personnel
- To develop, maintain and promote guidelines for library services

=== IFLA Secretaries General ===
List of IFLA Secretaries General
Name	Tenure
Sharon Memis	2023–present
Helen Mandl	2021–2023 (Acting)
Gerald Leitner	2016–2021
Jennefer Nicholson	2008–2016
Peter Lor	2005–2008
Rasu Ramachandran	2004–2005
Ross Shimmon	1999–2004
Leo Voogt	1992–1998
Paul Nauta	1987–1992
Margreet Wijnstroom	1971–1987
Anthony Thompson	1962–1970
Maria Razumovsky	1962 (Interim)
Joachim Wieder	1958–1962
Tietse Pieter Sevensma	1929–1958
Heinrich Uhlendahl	1928–1929

== Divisions ==
How to spot fake news IFLA publication (2017)

More than 60 sections, strategic programmes, and special interest groups are organized in five divisions to carry out a variety of IFLA's activities and programs.

These divisions are:

- Library Types (Division I) - includes sections focused on academic, research, public, special, and school libraries; a strategic programme for Committee on Standards; and special interest groups, including Evidence for Global and Disaster Health (E4GDH) group.
- Library Collections (Division II) - includes sections on acquisitions and collection development, rare books and special collections, and news media; strategic programmes on Preservation and Conservation (PAC) and the Committee on Standards; and special interest groups on LGBTQ users and on library publishing.
- Library Services (Division III) - includes sections on Bibliography, Cataloguing, and Indigenous Matters; strategic programmes on UNIMARC and the Committee on Standards; and special interest groups on big data and Digital Humanities.
- Support of the Profession (Division IV) - includes sections on library buildings and equipment, theory and research, and statistics and evaluation; strategic programmes for the Committee on Freedom of Access to Information and Freedom of Expression (FAIFE), Committee on Copyright and other Legal Matters (CLM), and the Committee on Standards; and special interest groups including Women, Information and Libraries Special Interest Group and LIS Education in Developing Countries.
- Regions (Division V) - includes sections on Africa, Asia and Oceania, Latin America and the Caribbean; strategic programmes for the Library Development Programme (LDP) and the Committee on Standards; and special interest group for Access to Information Network – Africa (ATINA).

== Strategic programmes ==
IFLA operates six strategic programmes:

- Committee on Standards
- Copyright and other Legal Matters (CLM) Advisory Committee
- Freedom of Access to Information and Freedom of Expression (FAIFE) Advisory Committee
- Library Development Programme (LDP)
- Strategic Programme on Preservation and Conservation (PAC)
- UNIMARC Strategic Programme.

=== Committee on Copyright and other Legal Matters (CLM) ===
Copyright and intellectual property issues and laws have long been recognized important to the library profession. A volunteer-driven committee, the CLM was created to advise and represent IFLA on matters of international copyright law.

The CLM produces legal briefs and is the representative for IFLA at meetings of the World Intellectual Property Organization (WIPO). The CLM's activities for the WIPO involve:

- Copyright limitations and exceptions for libraries and archives
- Copyright limitations and exceptions for visually impaired persons
- Relations with WIPO Secretariat
- Opposition to the Broadcast Treaty at WIPO
- Development Agenda at WIPO
- Preservation of Traditional Knowledge at WIPO

=== Committee on Free Access to Information and Freedom of Expression (FAIFE) ===
A core activity of IFLA is the Committee on Free Access to Information and Freedom of Expression, which monitors the state of intellectual freedom within the library community worldwide, supports IFLA policy development and co-operation with other international human rights organisations, and responds to violations of free access to information and freedom of expression. FAIFE provides guidance and leadership on issues of intellectual freedom around the world through the publication of annual reports, guidelines, manifestos, special reports, and statements.

In 2022, the 25th anniversary of the establishment of IFLA's Committee on Free Access to Information and Freedom of Expression, the landmark IFLA Statement on Libraries and Intellectual Freedom was the focus of a special issue of the IFLA Journal

IFLA/FAIFE is a member of the International Freedom of Expression Exchange, a global network of non-governmental organisations that monitors freedom of expression worldwide. It is also a member of the Tunisia Monitoring Group, a coalition of 16 free expression organisations that lobbies the Tunisian government to improve its human rights record.

=== Library Development Program (LDP) ===
Launched in 1984 and initially known as Advancement of Librarianship in the Third World, the programme has supported capacity building through a series of small grants and projects in developing and transition countries and advocacy for access to information. This program focuses predominantly on three main programs:

- Building Strong Library Associations Programme
- International Advocacy Programme (IAP), focusing on advocacy for the role of access to information and libraries in the UN 2030 Agenda for Sustainable Development
- International Leader's Programme.

=== Strategic Programme on Preservation and Conservation (PAC) ===
Established in 1984, the Strategic Programme on Preservation and Conservation (PAC) focuses on efforts to preserve library and archive materials, in any form, around the world. Unlike other IFLA Strategic Programmes, PAC features a decentralised approach, with global strategies implemented by a Focal Point and activities managed by Regional Centres.

PAC aims to ensure that both published and unpublished library and archive materials are preserved in an accessible form. In doing so, the programme follows three main guiding principles:

- preservation is essential to the survival and development of culture and scholarship;
- international cooperation is a key principle;
- each country must accept responsibility for the preservation of its own publications.

== IFLA Trend Report ==
The first IFLA Trend Report, "Caught in the waves or caught in the tide? Insights from the IFLA Trend Report", was launched at the World Library and Information Congress in Singapore on 19 August 2013. The IFLA Trend Report resulted in the identification of emerging high-level societal trends which may affect the global information environment. The Trend Report consists of a number of documents—including an overview, annotated bibliography and research papers—and is also intended as a web platform for ongoing consultation. In the first stage of the review from November 2012 through 2013, "social scientists, economists, business leaders, education specialists, legal experts and technologists"—mainly from outside the library field—were consulted. One of the key focal points of the report was the inundation of the archives with a tidal wave of information. By 2010 this represented more than 1 zettabytes of data or 1.8 trillion gigabytes.

The report listed five key trends predicted to impact how societies and individuals "access, use, and benefit from information in an increasingly hyper-connected world":

- new technologies that "will both expand and limit who has access to information"
- online education that "will democratise and disrupt global learning"
- redefinition of the boundaries of privacy and data protection
- hyper-connected societies that "will listen to and empower new voices and groups:
- transformation of the global information economy through new technologies

The IFLA Trend Report continues to publish annual updates on these five key trends, as well as compiling and creating further resources.

== Manifestos ==
IFLA has endorsed and collaborated on several manifestos that cover a wide range of issues related to libraries. These manifestos include:

- IFLA/UNESCO Public Library Manifesto 1994 (1994)
- IFLA/UNESCO School Library Manifesto 1999 (1999)
- Alexandria Manifesto on Libraries, the Information Society in Action (2005)
- IFLA Manifesto on Transparency, Good Governance and Freedom from Corruption (2008)
- IFLA/UNESCO Multicultural Library Manifesto (2009)
- IFLA Library Statistics Manifesto (2010)
- IFLA/UNESCO Manifesto for Digital Libraries (2010)
- IFLA Manifesto for libraries serving persons with a print disability (2012)
- Internet Manifesto 2014 (2014)
- A Library Manifesto for Europe (2019)
- IFLA School Library Manifesto (2021)—forthcoming
- IFLA-UNESCO Public Library Manifesto (2022)
- IFLA Internet Manifesto (2024)

=== Manifesto for Libraries Serving Persons with a Print Disability (LPD) ===
Endorsed by IFLA's Governing Board in April 2012, the first draft of the Manifesto for Libraries Serving Persons with a Print Disability was intended to support the Marrakesh VIP Treaty. After further drafts, the LPD Manifesto was passed in November 2013 at the 37th UNESCO General Conference in Paris. The LPD Manifesto encourages libraries to provide more accessible library and information services for blind and visually impaired patrons. According to the IFLA, lack of access to information is the biggest barrier for persons with a print disability to fully and effectively participate in all aspects of society.

The six statements of the LPD Manifesto are as follows:

1. IFLA recommends that all library and information providers, as part of their core services, put in place services, collections, equipment and facilities, which will assist individual users with a print disability to access and use resources that meet their particular needs for information.
2. IFLA encourages library and information service providers to consult individuals with a disability, and groups representing them, in the planning, development and ongoing delivery of services.
3. IFLA acknowledges that the best services are provided by professionals who are aware of the needs of, and service options for, people with a print disability. Therefore, IFLA encourages all library and information services to ensure that staff are adequately trained and available to work with users with a print disability, and supports career-long professional development and formal library and information studies programs, which will facilitate the strengthening of equitable library and information services to people with a print disability.
4. IFLA supports efforts to improve access to resources by people with a print disability through service agreements, referrals and sharing of resources between library and information services; and between these and other organisations specialising in services targeted for people with a print disability. Therefore, IFLA encourages the establishment and development of an international network of libraries of accessible materials.
5. IFLA supports efforts to ensure that copyright legislation enables equal access by people with a print disability to information from all libraries and information providers.
6. In addition to meeting legislative requirements, IFLA encourages the observation of universal design principles, guidelines and standards to ensure that library and information services, collections, technologies, equipment and facilities meet the identified needs of users with a print disability.

== Jay Jordan IFLA/OCLC Early Career Development Fellowship Program ==
The Jay Jordan IFLA/OCLC Early Career Development Fellowship Program Sponsored by IFLA and OCLC, "provides early career development and continuing education for library and information science professionals from countries with developing economies." Each year, the four-week program provides up to five individuals with the opportunity to interact with important information practitioners in the field. Fellows deliver presentations that address libraries' challenges and formulate development plans that benefit their personal career growth.

=== IFLA/OCLC Fellows by Year ===
IFLA/OCLC Fellows by Year
Year	Fellows
2019	John Oluwaseye Adebayo, Chrisland University, Nigeria Samar Jammoul, Safadi Public Library, Lebanon Davaasuren Myagmar, National Library of Mongolia Tracey-Ann Ricketts, National Library of Jamaica Ramiro Jose Rico Carranza, Universidad Católica Boliviana San Pablo, Bolivia
2018	Alehegn Adane Kinde, University of Gondar, Ethiopia Arnold Mwanzu, International Centre of Insect Physiology & Ecology (icipe), Kenya Boris Đenadić, National Library of Serbia, Serbia Chantelle Richardson, National Library of Jamaica Chandra Pratama Setiawan, Petra Christian University, Indonesia
2017	Patience Ngizi-Hara, The Copperbelt University, Zambia Eric Nelson Haumba, YMCA Comprehensive Institute, Uganda Sharisse Rae Lim, National Library of the Philippines Jerry Mathema, Masiyephambili College, Zimbabwe Nguyen Van Kep, Hanoi University, Vietnam
2016	Idowu Adegbilero-Iwari, Nigeria Željko Dimitrijević, Serbia Penninah Musangi, Kenya Rhea Jade Nabusan, Philippines Shaharima Parvin, Bangladesh
2015	Stanislava Gardaševic, Serbia Nomsa Mathabela, Swaziland Masimba Muziringa, Zimbabwe Martin Julius Perez, Philippines Sadaf Rafiq, Pakistan
2014	Olufunmilayo Fati, Nigeria Franklin Flores Urrutia, El Salvador W. M. Tharanga Dilruk Ranasinghe, Sri Lanka Leonila Reyes, Philippines Sonam Wangdi, Bhutan
2013	Dwaymian Brissette, Jamaica Caroline Nyaga-Kithinji, Kenya David Ofili, Nigeria Rozita Petrinska-Labudovikj, Republic of Macedonia Chona San Pedro, Philippines
2012	Efua Ayiah, Ghana Gladys Mungai, Kenya Md. Shafiur Rahman, Bangladesh Tanzela Shaukat, Pakistan Ngozi Ukachi, Nigeria
2011	Khumo Dibeela, Botswana Geanrose Lagumbay, Philippines Ngwira Fiskani, Malawi Milan Vasiljevic, Serbia Tian Xiaodi, China
2010	Sasekea Harris, Jamaica Mahmoud Khalifa, Egypt Elchin Mammadov, Azerbaijan Catherine Muriuki, Kenya Sidra Shan, Pakistan Shao Yan, China
2009	John Kiyaga, Uganda Ani Minasyan, Armenia Caleb Ouma, Kenya Saima Qutab, Pakistan Raymond Sikanyika, Zambia Vesna Vuksan, Serbia
2008	Hanan Erhif, Morocco Atanu Garai, India Kamal Giri, Nepal Sarah Kaddu, Uganda Cyrill Walters, South Africa
2007	Kodjo Atiso, Ghana Alicia Esguerra, Philippines Pauline Nicholas, Jamaica Elisangela Silva, Brazil Nevena Tomić, Serbia
2006	Maria Cherrie, Trinidad & Tobago Janete Estevão, Brazil Festus Ngetich, Kenya Roman Purici, Moldova Salmubi, Indonesia
2005	Thomas Bello, Malawi Xiaoqing Cai, China Edwar Delgado, Colombia Lela Nanuashvili, Georgia Rev. Gillian Wilson, Jamaica
2004	Nayana Wijayasundara, Sri Lanka MacAnthony Cobblah, Ghana Musa Olaka, Rwanda Muhammad Rafiq, Pakistan
2003	Anjali Gulati, India Ibrahim Ramjaun, Mauritius Vu Thi Nha, Vietnam Hyekyong Hwang, Korea Selenay Aytaç, Turkey
2002	Ferry Iranian, Indonesia Sibongile Madolo, South Africa Purity Mwagha, Kenya J.K. Vijayakumar, India Dayang Zarina Abang Ismail, Malaysia
2001	Andy Igonor, South Africa Tuba Akbayturk, Turkey Smita Chandra, India Rashidah Bolhassan, Malaysia

== President ==
The current president of IFLA is Leslie Weir.

IFLA Presidents in time. In yellow the presidents with a Wikipedia article, in gray without a Wikipedia article. In red female presidents and in green male presidents. Data from August 2019.

List of presidents of the International Federation of Library Associations and Institutions
Name	Country	Tenure
Isak Collijn	Sweden	1927–1931
William Warner Bishop	United States	1931–1936
Marcel Godet	Switzerland	1936–1947
Wilhelm Munthe	Norway	1947–1951
Pierre Bourgeois	Switzerland	1951–1958
Gustav Hofmann	West Germany	1958–1963
Sir Frank Francis	United Kingdom	1963–1969
Herman Liebaers	Belgium	1969–1974
Preben Kirkegaard	Denmark	1974–1979
Else Granheim	Norway	1979–1985
Hans-Peter Geh	West Germany	1985–1991
Robert Wedgeworth	United States	1991–1997
Christine Deschamps	France	1997–2003
Kay Raseroka	Botswana	2003–2005
Alex Byrne	Australia	2005–2007
Claudia Lux	Germany	2007–2009
Ellen Tise	South Africa	2009–2011
Ingrid Parent	Canada	2011–2013
Sinikka Sipilä	Finland	2013–2015
Donna Scheeder	United States	2015–2017
Gloria Pérez-Salmerón	Spain	2017–2019
Christine Mackenzie	Australia	2019–2021
Barbara Lison	Germany	2021–2023
Vicki McDonald	Australia	2023–2025
Leslie Weir	Canada	2025–2027

== Publications ==
- IFLA Journal is an academic journal in the fields of libraries, library and information science, and freedom of information published quarterly by SAGE Publication on behalf of IFLA

== See also ==
- Public library ratings
- Coordinating Council of Audiovisual Archives Association
- UNESCO Public Library Manifesto
- List of library associations
