= Abbas Kessel =

Iranian professor (1918–1987)

- Born: 1918; Tehran, Iran
- Died: September 26, 1987 (age 68 or 69); Whitewater, Wisconsin, U.S.
- Education: University of Brimingham (BS) University of California, Berkeley (MS) Illinois Institute of Technology (MS) University of Chicago (PhD)
- Occupation: Engineer • Professor
- Spouse: Ruth Miner Kessel (m. 1984)

Abbas Kessel (1918 – September 26, 1987) was a political scientist and professor at the now Minnesota State University, Mankato (Note: Known as Mankato State College (1957-1975) and Mankato State University (1975-1998) at the time of employment.) for 19 years. He was an advocate for peaceful protests, notably during Mankato’s anti-Vietnam war demonstrations. After his death, he was honored at the University through namesakes of the Kessel Lectures Series and Kessel Institute for the Study of Peace and Change.

== Early life and education ==
Kessel was born in 1918 in Tehran, Iran. (Note: Known as Persia at the time of birth) (Note: His parents did not register his birth until he was seven. By then, only the year was noted) His father was a minor tax collector, and his mother was a homemaker. He studied in Tehran until receiving an engineering scholarship at seventeen years old. He completed his Bachelor of Science at the University of Birmingham in July of 1939. That same year, he became a British citizen.

In 1946, he continued his education at the University of California, Berkeley for his first master's in engineering. In 1951, he pursued his second master’s in engineering at the Illinois Institute of Technology. He eventually enrolled in the University of Chicago for a career change to political science, earning his Ph.D. in economics and social problems in 1956. This is where he met his future wife, Ruth Miner. He became a U.S. citizen in 1964.

== Career ==
=== Engineering (1940 – 1946) ===
Soon after returning home in 1940 upon earning his bachelor's degree, Kessel worked as an engineer at Anglo-Iranian Oil Company. A year later, he became an administrator for a government construction office for four years.

=== Political science (1946 – 1985) ===
He worked for the Chicago’s Department of Planning before hired as a professor at the University of Chicago Downtown College. He was a member of the Chicago Council on International Relations. He advocated in reducing foreign U.S. military presence and budget in favor of increasing aid in developing countries. In 1966, he was hired by Mankato State College for the Political Science department. He taught introduction to politics, international relations, environment politics, world politics, Middle East, international law, American foreign policy, and a seminar. He was one of the first international faculty members at the College. In 1972, Kessel became a faculty representative for the Peace Studies Center at the College before it transformed into the Peace Studies minor for the School of Arts and Science. The minor was discontinued in 1980. He was part of the Minority Group Studies Center committee as a faculty representation. He dedicated himself to critical essays in local and national newspapers about education, America, and global affairs.

== Activism and Organization Leadership ==
Touted as “a voice for peace” by Mankato residents, Kessel was active in Mankato for his anti-war sentiments. Political Science professor, Scott Shrewsbury, writes that although Kessel was seen as “an instigator of protest. Many people did not realize that Kessel preferred orderly dialogue and discussion. But if demonstration was inevitable, he intended to do everything possible to make sure they were kept peaceful and constructive.” He led peaceful protests and educated about history of the Vietnam War and U.S. involvement on campus.

=== Kent State shootings protests (1970) ===
From May 5th to 9th, 1970 there were large, anti-war protests at Mankato State College after the Kent State shootings. Tuesday afternoon, Reverend John Fry gave a speech that inspired a 300-person march through Highland Campus to Old Main downtown. Upon reaching the post office, some desired to burn draft records. "Speaking from the top of one of the post office’s South Second Street entry stairways, Kessel insisted that the anti-war movement could be effective only through peaceful protests”. While subduing many of the protestors, a few windows were broken and effigies burnt. The next day, over 2,000 people listened to Kessel’s anti-war letter to U.S. President Richard Nixon. The following day, a crowd between 2,000 to 3,000 assembled for a three-hour teach-in on campus. Kessel, President James “Jim” Nickerson, and Political Science professors Charles Mundale, Scott Shrewbury, and Truman Wood spoke during the presentation. Because of minimal damages, many praised Kessel for his active peaceful stance and “established him as the institution’s main peace advocate and foreign policy critic”. He disagreed with Chair of Ideas, Mitchell Goodman, and previous Political Science professor, Barclay Kuhn, methods of protest due to its disruption to daily life.

=== Anti-Vietnam war protests (1972) ===
On May 4, 1972, a Mankato State College student protest caused minor damage to the post office. This prompted Mitchell Goodman and Kessel to host debates for students, faculty, and administration concerning anti-war tactics and strategies for days. On May 9th there was a planned afternoon sit-in of an estimated 2,000 protesters at the intersection of Main and Front Streets. It's reported Kessel calmed potential acts of aggression.

=== Lectures ===
Kessel spoke at several organization events in Chicago. In 1957, he presented at Friends of the Library about his ideas for the future of India’s economic development. In 1962, he was a guest speaker for the League of Women Voters to discuss how trade affects politics of major and neutral powers.

== Personal life ==
Described as a petite man who wore ill-fitting thrifted brown suits, he enjoyed tending his flower garden and was considered friendly, gentle, and shy. He enjoyed the works of Charles Darwin, Wolfgang Amadeus Mozart, George Bernard Shaw, and Pablo Picasso. His philosophies for peaceful protests were inspired by Mahatma Gandhi and Martin Luther King Jr. alongside influencing his criticisms of America’s involvement in Southeast Asia.

=== Residence ===
Living near the Valley Campus, he had a black house with a grass-less yard transformed into a garden of wild and local plants. His 1930s bungalow had an uncommon open plan with many bookshelves. He hung up art depending on season and mood. In the winter, he housed plants inside. The wood floor was covered in oriental rugs. During visits to Kessel’s home, Tom Hagen of Mankato, described that Kessel would serve tea in Malaysian sterling silver, play Gustav Mahler over the phonograph, and “talked about flowers or art, but rarely about politics or the academic world in which Kessel had immersed himself.” His furniture and shelves were self-made and designed. In particular, he had a chair he designed, built, and painted black to fit him personally.

== Later life and death ==
In 1984, at the age of 66, he married long-time friend, Ruth Miner. A year later, he retired from Mankato State University after 19 years as a professor. He delivered a valedictory lecture on that occasion. Scott Shrewsbury introduced him:

The Annual Kessel Lecture Series was established at Mankato State to commemorate Kessel's contribution to the intellectual and cultural life of the campus and community. It will bring to the campus people, who in their own work, like Kessel, have demonstrated outspoken courage, incisiveness and compassionate dedication with regard to the world issues of foreign policy, environmental policy and energy policy. Kessel could be counted on to serve as our conscience and our guide in ethical matters and was bravely always visible up front in the defense of justice, truth and goodness...the series will be our way of reminding ourselves, the campus and the community of the impact that Kessel has had on us all.

He moved in with Ruth who worked at the University of Wisconsin-Whitewater. Around this time, he battled leukemia until his death on September 26, 1987.

== Legacy ==
In 1985, the Kessel Lectureship—also known as the Kessel Lecture Series—was created by the Political Science department in honor of his campus contributions. One of the earliest lectures was presented by Professor David Noble the evening of November 18, 1987. In 1995, the lectureship and Ruth Minor Kessel established the Kessel Institute for the Study of Peace and Change—or the Kessel Peace Institute. The first director was History professor, Donald Strasser. Later directors include Jackie Vieceli, Barbara Carson, and Carole Glasser. As of 2020, History professor, Jameel Haque, has taken the mantle as director.
