= History of public library advocacy =

Public libraries in the American Colonies can be traced back to 1656, when a Boston merchant named Captain Robert Keayne willed his collection of books to the town.

Church collections of books used by the public served as early versions of libraries in New England around the 18th century. One such example is the King's Chapel Library in Boston, which was founded in 1698 with book donations from the Bishop of London.

Reverend Thomas Bray was instrumental in the establishment of libraries for public use. This Anglican clergyman had sponsored several parish libraries in England, and from 1695 to 1704 he managed to establish 70 libraries in the American Colonies. These included five provincial libraries located in the major cities of time, 39 parochial libraries at Anglican parishes, and 35 layman libraries where ministers were allowed to loan the materials to their local residents. Bray's provincial libraries in Maryland and South Carolina were both the beneficiaries of the first laws passed by the local legislation to secure and maintain the libraries in their provinces.

In 1731, Benjamin Franklin and his fellow members of the Junto established the Library Company of Philadelphia. This type of subscription library brought access to books for the residents who paid to become a member. It also served as a model and inspiration for many other libraries that began to spring up throughout the colonies. Other types of libraries included commercial circulating libraries, athenaeums, and school-district libraries. The start of the development of the American library as it is known today, however, began in full force between 1850 and 1900.

== Early history, prior to 1900 ==
In the 1600s, British colonists brought their love of books to America, with the deceased often leaving their collections to the public. For example, Robert Keayne left his collection to his community, Boston Town Hall, which was considered a "subscription" or "society" library.

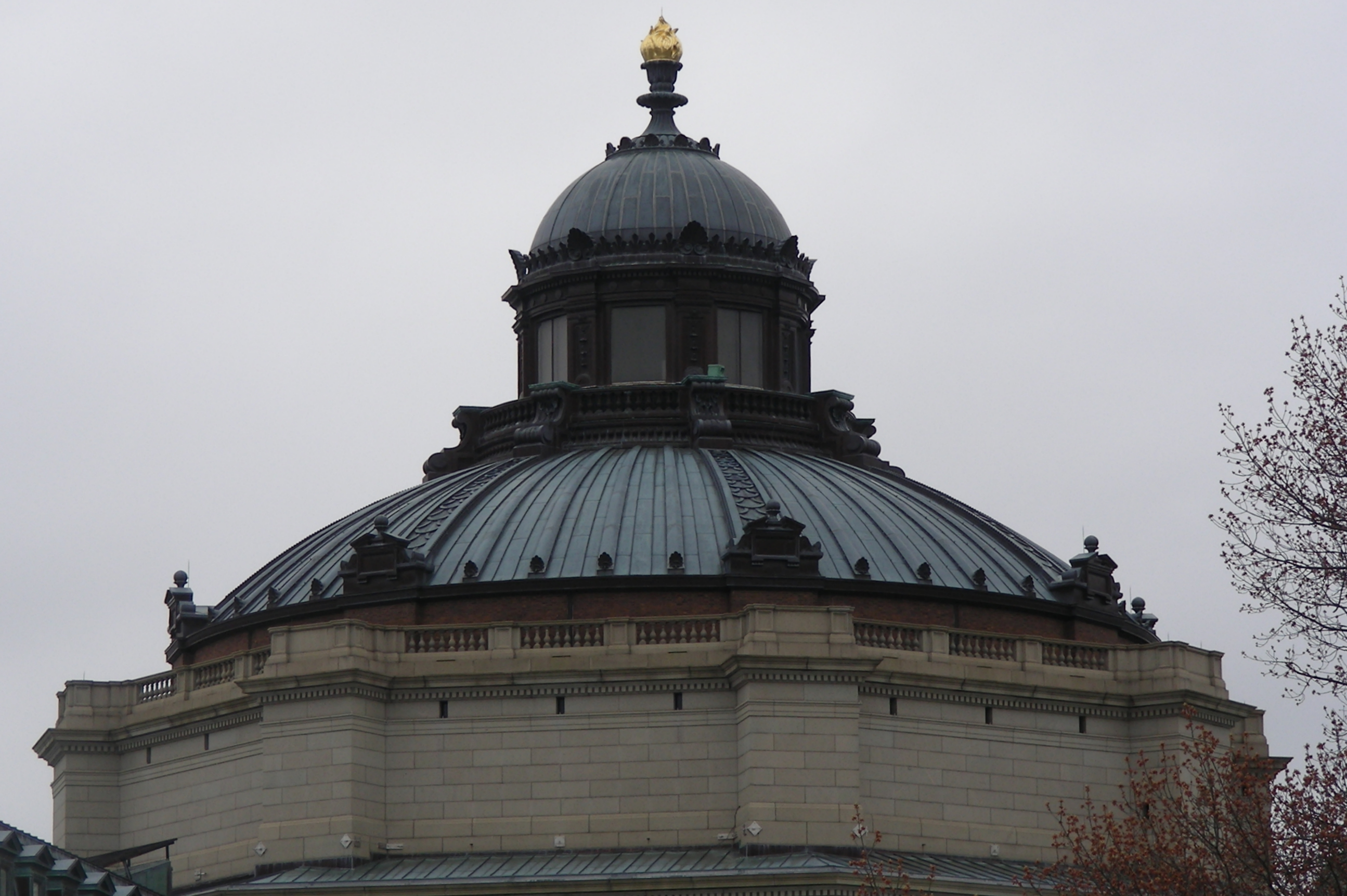
The top level of the Thomas Jefferson Building, part of the Library of Congress, Washington, DC, USA.

The destruction of the Library of Congress by the British in the War of 1812 was devastating, but the subsequent purchase of Thomas Jefferson's personal library influenced future public library content. Jefferson's library reflected Jefferson's own interests in education, rational thinking, and discovery, a stark difference from the scope of the original Library of Congress, which primarily contained subjects relating to law, history, and economics. Jefferson's comprehensive interests in such subjects as history, literature, sciences, mathematics, and invention would invoke opposition to the purchase of his library from the House of Representatives due to such divergence from traditionalist morals and ideals, but the purchase of the library nevertheless came to fruition in early 1815.

=== Public library advocates ===
In 1833, the New York State school district raised taxes for public libraries. That same year, Reverend Abiel Abbot urged the citizens of Peterborough, New Hampshire, to establish a public library, which would be free to citizens and paid for by taxes.

In 1841 in Boston, French ventriloquist and philanthropist Alexandre Vattemare promoted the development of a public library. The American Library Association was formed in 1876 and continues to act as a fundamental entity for the continued advocacy and political involvement of public libraries.

Women's organizations were instrumental in advocating for the importance of public libraries and shaping their role in the community. Caroline M. Hewing, librarian and library advocate, was the first children's library associate.

Since revenue from property taxes and federal funding alone do not support public libraries, advocates seek new ways for obtaining money, such as through private donations from library advocates like Andrew Carnegie, whose vast donations set precedent for the vital participation of future philanthropists. The Bill and Melinda Gates Foundation provides internet access and computer-related grants. However, there is much controversy involved in whether private donations can hurt the integrity of libraries.

=== Public libraries emerge ===
The Boston Public Library opened in 1854 thanks to the efforts of Edward Everett and George Ticknor, local leading figures who wrote the Report in 1852. This document identified the historical importance of the written word and libraries and included passionate arguments for the necessity of a library in Boston.

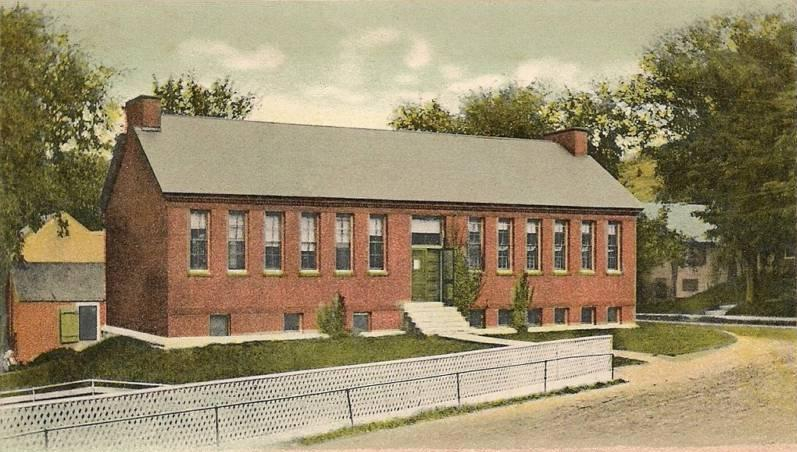
Peterborough Town Library, the first completely tax supported public library in the United States, 1906, Peterborough, New Hampshire.

Boston Public Library, however, was not the first library supported by local taxes and available for all citizens. The first public library supported by taxes was the Peterborough Town Library in Peterborough, New Hampshire, which made books available to the public in 1833. New Hampshire was one of the first to use new state laws to its advantage, which entitled local government units to levy taxes. New Hampshire then founded the first completely tax-supported local public library in the United States under the model of "open to all and free of charge". This was the beginning of the modern library movement. Civic leaders identified taxes as an excellent primary means of support for libraries. New York made the decision to open libraries to the public, supported by tax money raised by the local school districts. While this concept ultimately failed, it served as a foundation for current public library system.

=== Formation of library associations ===
1853 was the year of the first Librarians' Convention. It was held in New York City and attended by 80 men. For three days, the men discussed issues critical to the institutions, such as cataloging, collection development, and communication. The American Library Association was formed out of the Convention of Librarians held in Philadelphia in 1876. At the first meeting, Melvil Dewey was in attendance along with 102 other men and 13 women. It was an agreed philosophy among those present that the importance of reading contributed directly to social progress. The aim of the association, in that resolution, was "to enable librarians to do their present work more easily and at less expense."

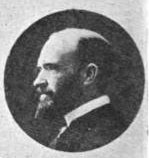
Melvil Dewey (December 10, 1851 – December 26, 1931), inventor of the Dewey Decimal System and editor of the Library Journal was an advocate for public libraries.

The same year also saw the establishment of Library Journal, which was edited by Melvil Dewey. The publication is still the most respected within the profession.

=== The field of library science ===
Dewey was also instrumental at the New York State Library as he developed a part of the library collection specifically for children, created the job of a librarian dedicated solely to reference materials, and spearheaded traveling libraries to serve communities without access to public libraries. Dewey stated, "that state libraries were the best agencies for supporting the development of public and school libraries."

Nearly every large city could boast of a public library by the 1870s. Caroline Hewins became the first librarian of the Hartford Public Library and was active in the American Library Association. Hewins led the way in a new era of women as librarians and a general rise in librarianship in the late 19th century and early 20th century. Dewey founded the Columbia College School of Library Economy in New York City (which later became the New York State Library School in Albany before returning to Columbia), with the majority of the students being women.

=== Philanthropy as advocacy ===
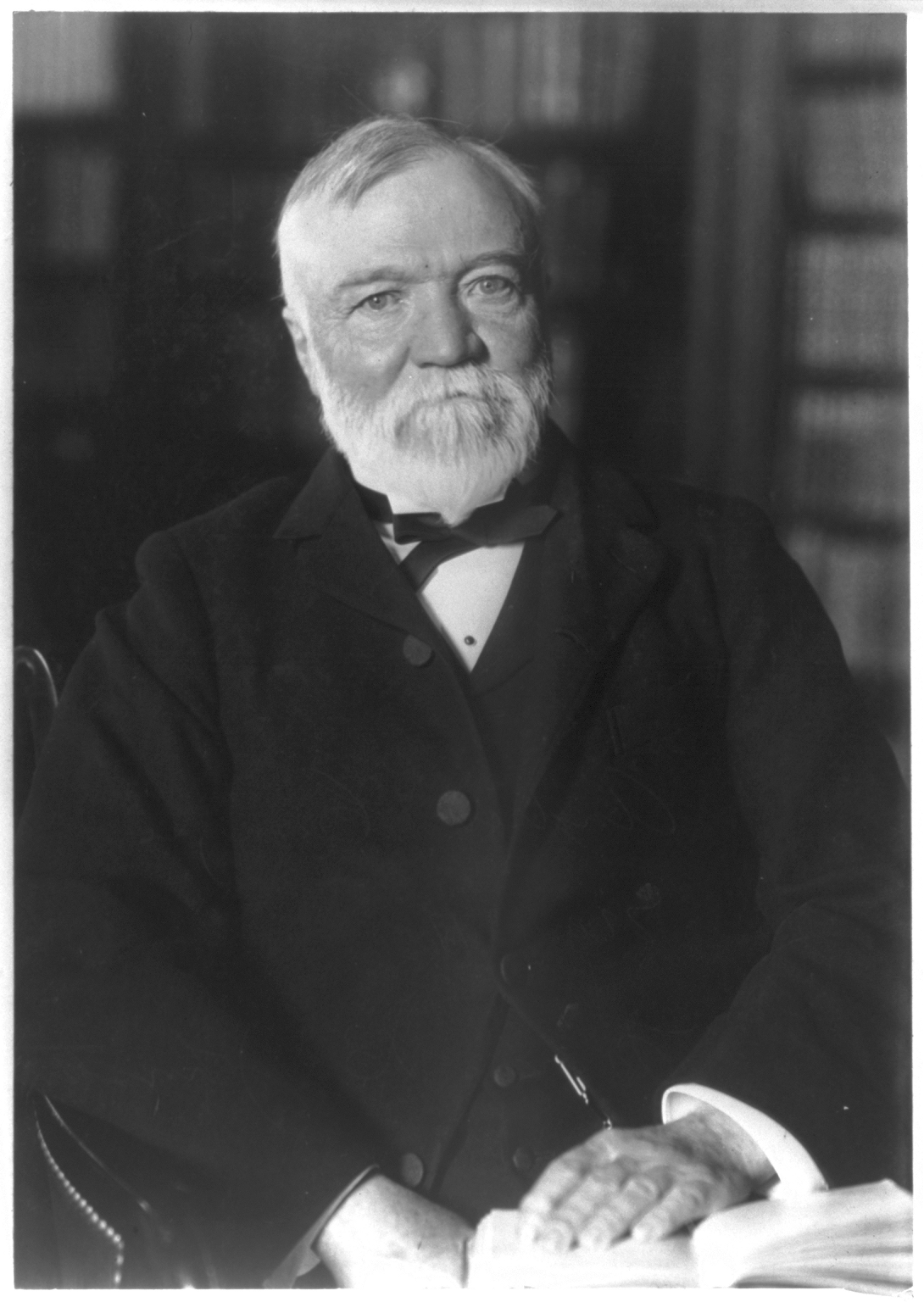
Andrew Carnegie (25 November 1835 – 11 August 1919) was an American businessman, philanthropist, and major supporter of public libraries.

Benefactors also played a large role in advocating for public libraries by providing money for construction. Andrew Carnegie began his legacy in 1881 by presenting his workers in Pittsburgh with a library. "I choose free libraries as the best agencies for improving the masses of the people," said Carnegie. 2,500 libraries were constructed as a result of his philanthropy.

== 1900–1935 ==
=== Public library advocacy and women ===
The start of the 20th century continued to see rapid growth in the establishment of public libraries. During the late 19th century, the General Federation of Women's Clubs (GFWC) was formed. This national organization became one of the main advocates for free public libraries in the United States. In 1904, Mrs. Charles A. Perkins wrote, in the Federation Bulletin (the official organ of the GFWC), that "clubs had established 474 free public libraries." In order to start these libraries, clubwomen would advocate for various forms of legislation. Laws were needed to enable municipalities to provide tax support to libraries. The lobbying for this legislation created state commissions. Clubwomen would also raise money by utilizing their own skills through bake sales, entertainments, and other small-scale fund-raising events. Books were collected through donations or purchased from the funds earned by the clubs.

In 1914, the executive secretary of the American Library Association, G.B. Utley, stated that "fully one half the libraries in the country had been established through the influence of American women."

=== Public library advocacy and World War I ===
During World War I, the American Library Association established its Library War Service. Librarians expanded their services by work on the home front and overseas. Because of the success of libraries during the war, the development of library services were encouraged and promoted for all Americans.

=== Public libraries and education ===
During the 1920s, the role of public libraries began to shift. As federal support for libraries expanded, the idea of promoting adult education became the focus in public libraries. In 1924, "the report to the Carnegie Corporation, The American Public Library and the Diffusion of Knowledge, included the observation that 'the free public library is already an accepted and cherished figure in American intellectual life...'"

In 1926, the ALA study, Libraries and Adult Education, was published, and the Board on Library and Adult Education (later the Adult Education Board) was established. The concept of libraries being connected with education quickly spread throughout the United States. "During the 1920s and 1930s ALA embraced the idea of libraries as a means to provide adult educational opportunities and combined this idea with many efforts to extend library service to unserved areas."

== 1935–1960 ==
In 1934, the American Library Association Executive Board developed a National Plan through its National Planning Committee. This was designed to "examine the inequity of tax-support for public libraries and sought provision of financial support so that library materials might be available throughout the nation." The National Plan was approved by the American Library Association in 1935.

The Public Library Association division of the American Library Association was founded in 1944. It was developed to enhance the development and effectiveness of public library staff and services. It is a member-driven organization that provides a diverse program of publication, advocacy, continuing education, and programming for its members and others interested in the advancement of public library service. Among the Public Library Association's priority concerns are adequate funding for public libraries and improved access to library resources.

American Library Association published "A National Plan for Public Library Service" in 1948. This proposed "a nation-wide minimum standard of service and support below which no library should fall." The plan advocated for equalization of financial support, pointing out the inequalities among states in per capita spending for public libraries.

In 1945, the American Library Association opened a Washington, DC office to strengthen their ties with the Office of Education and with Congress.

Between 1947 and 1952, the American Library Association hosted a study called "Public Library Inquiry." It was multipart study "to define legitimate library activity by adapting the traditional educational purposes of libraries to new social conditions and the public's willingness to pay for such services."

Through a concerted effort by the American Library Association's division of American Library Trustee Association, the Library Services Act was passed in 1956, currently called the Library Services and Technology Act. John E. Fogarty, worked with Senator Lister Hill to establish the LSA. The history of this effort is highlighted in James Healey's monograph: John E. Fogarty: Political Leadership for Library Development. Congressman Fogerty was impressed by the pioneer work of Rhode Island state librarian, Elizabeth Myer, and went on to champion extension of library service.

Before receiving federal aid, the Library Service Act required that each state submit a plan for library development in underserved areas, especially in rural areas.

== 1960–1985 ==
The 1960s brought about turmoil in libraries across the southern United States. African-Americans attempted to access white libraries across the American South. One of the most famous examples included the 1960 sit-in at Greenville, South Carolina. Eight African-American students refused to leave the Greenville Public Library and were arrested but soon released. A mere two months later the Greenville Public Library opened as an integrated facility. There was also the instance where two African-American ministers were attacked at the Anniston Public library when they attempted to integrate. Despite the deep-rooted feelings between African-Americans and Whites, most southern cities were more willing to integrate the public libraries over other public facilities. According to Michael Fultz, "Of seventy-six southern cities with a population of fifty thousand or more in 1963, seventy-one had integrated main library facilities; sixteen of the twenty-one largest Deep South cities had integrated main libraries, although only two had integrated schools" However, the significance of public library African-American integration in this decade should not be downplayed.

As libraries began to grow, so too did the discrimination regarding who could make use of the facilities. In some places, state and local governments were in support of segregation and in 1896 the Supreme Court upheld Plessy v. Ferguson which allowed the segregation of public places. Later, around 1902 Carnegie would fund the building of a public library in Atlanta which W.E.B. DuBois would speak out against as a place where “a full third of Atlanta’s population” would not be able to visit. Although, DuBois did not change the rulings of the law, his protests would bring about funding for “colored branches to the attention of philanthropists like Carnegie.” There were other libraries open for African Americans before 1921, but the first African American library to open in Atlanta would not be until July 25, 1921. The library included many notable librarians including Annie McPheeters who developed the non-circulating “Negro History Collection.” The city, in 1949, built a second branch to accommodate the rise in population and migration to the west side. Other areas in which libraries were built for the African American community include school libraries in Memphis, Tennessee (1903), Galveston, Texas (1904), and Jacksonville, Florida (1905) The overall development of African American libraries was slow to develop. In fact, it would not be until the “Civil Rights Movement of the 1950s and 1960s that segregated public libraries would be challenged through coordinated, non-violent protest action” (Digital Public Library of America).

In the 1970s and 1980s, public libraries began to understand the importance of working with American youth to promote education. According to Shirley A. Fitzgibbons, "More public libraries began to offer programs and services for preschoolers at younger ages, including toddlers and babies along with parents and caretakers, in recognition of this educational role to facilitate language and literacy development of the young child." This concept has proven to be instrumental in the development of childhood literacy into the current decade.

== 1985–present ==
In 1985, there was a volunteer that worked in a public library that played an important role in her community by taking books every week to the elderly and handicapped people in their community. She also took her own time to help out the elderly by helping the read tax and other forms that they needed to fill out.

In 1986, Nancy Herman, who worked for the American Library Association's office for Intellectual Freedom, said that two different schools in Illinois were challenging Mark Twain's book Huckleberry Finn because the schools were saying that the book was racist. The book was not banned due to the NAACP saying that the "book should not be banned, but should be explained" (Fred Rothenburg)

In May 1988, a library in New Haven, Connecticut decided to take all of their materials that were getting really old, brittle, falling apart or even deteriorating like books, maps, manuscripts and other materials to be transferred to microfilm, so that the materials could be saved.

March 13, 1991 – around sixty librarians and trustees got together to find ways to be able to get more funding for libraries "from the state and municipalities and to press for country aid." They feel like they need more funding and support especially for the younger generation to get the skills and information that they need or get from the library. They are also going to try to get libraries to get advocacy groups to help with funding libraries as well.

On August 31, 1995 – There is a public school library that is banning books from their classrooms because of the content of some of the books. "The liberal advocacy group said that there were 338 attempts to remove or restrict access to a book and 169 attempts were successful. Most of the books that were being challenged are due to the fact that they have profanity, violence or sexual scenes." (Milwaukee Journal)

Aug of 1998, "The National Multiple Sclerosis Society has a library that they lend library materials that they send home with postage paid return envelope. They also have materials for people that are visually impaired." (Cedartown Standard)

In 2005 and 2006, The American Baseball League and ALA have joined together to get fans of all "different ages to participate in their contest about online baseball trivia competition." This competition of baseball trivia is to being awareness to "the 21st Century literacy skills such as using computers and other media and knowing how to find evaluate and use information." (PR Newswire) Also this game hopefully challenges the participants to get more familiar with the library by answering different kinds of baseball questions.

In 2008, The Gates Foundation gave 6.9 Million dollars to help libraries that are struggling to have internet or faster internet to their patrons. This money will be split in two by "6.1 Million going to a non-profit broadband advocacy group and the rest of the money going to ALA's office for Technology Policy." (David Chartier) This extra money that these businesses get from the Gates Foundation will help out tremendously with the huge increase in patrons using the libraries use of free internet access.

In 2009, Friends of Libraries U.S.A. (FOLUSA) and the Association for Library Trustees and Advocates (ALTA) join to become an expanded division of ALA known as ALTAFF, the Association of Library Trustees, Advocates, Friends and Foundations. Friends of the Library provide support through raising the budget of libraries by book sales and outreach. ALTAFF continues to fight for library and user rights, tackling such issues as youth access to internet content and censorship, such as with the sponsorship of Banned Book Week: Celebrating the Freedom to Read. Public libraries continue to use a variety of innovative ways to advertise and advocate the importance of their services for the community through Twitter, blogs, and Facebook and by offering services such as internet/wireless access to the availability of different forms of media.

In 2010, schools, filmmakers, and others are able to get the technology that they need to be able to help the people that are deaf or visually impaired and others to be able to see or hear movies, books or other materials. Just like the public libraries are able to provide some materials with other companies doing this will help people that are visually impaired or blind not to feel like they can't do anything since no other company provides the technology that they need besides libraries. Also e-readers will have an option to have the book or material on the e-reader read out loud to the person.

== See also ==
- American Library Association
- Andrew Carnegie
- Bill & Melinda Gates Foundation
- Education for librarianship
- Friends of Libraries
- Guerrilla librarian
- Informatics
- Librarian
- Library Company of Philadelphia
- Library history
- Library of Congress
- Library Journal
- Library science
- List of libraries
- List of library associations
- Melvil Dewey
- OCLC
- Philanthropy
- Preservation (library and archival science)
- Public library
- Public library advocacy
- Public space
