= Public Libraries (journal) =

Public Libraries is the official publication of the Public Library Association (PLA), a division of the American Library Association (ALA). It is devoted exclusively to public libraries. The print edition is published six times a year and is a delayed open access journal, with older issues available as PDF files on the journal's website.

== Early history ==
Public Libraries' first issue came out in May 1896. According to its Prospectus, the magazine came about as a response to "many letters of inquiry ... which the larger libraries receive from the smaller ones in every part of the country" about the "small details and elementary principles of [library] work."

[Public Libraries] will deal with all phases of library work in a concise, simple way, such as will give the best aid to those who need it." To that end, the Prospectus outlined what the magazine set out to cover in 1896 — "a large variety of items of news, such as will encourage and inspire small libraries as well as large, to put forth their best effort to accomplish something of value to the library world." The first issue contains the outline of a future ALA publication, the "ALA Library Primer" which concerns itself with both practical and philosophical concerns about establishing a library, such as suggestions for selecting books ("Every library building should be planned specially for the kind of work to be done, and the community to be served" and the qualities that should be looked for when hiring a librarian ("The librarian should have culture, scholarship, and executive ability.")

=== Past Editors ===
Gerald R. Shields

== Current focus ==
Today, Public Libraries' website proclaims that "each issue includes important industry news, PLA and ALA updates, and columns and feature articles that offer strategies and ideas that can make a difference in your career."

The following is a list of recurring columns that appear in the journal at the present moment:

- News From PLA
- Perspectives (" 'Perspectives' offers varied viewpoints on subjects of interest to the public library profession.")
- Tales from the Front
- Internet Spotlight ("'Internet Spotlight' explores Internet and Web topics relevant to librarians in the public library sector.")
- Bringing in the Money ( "'Bringing in the Money' presents fundraising strategies for public libraries.")
- Passing Notes ("'Passing Notes' focuses on young adult service issues, including programming, collection development, and creating stronger connections with young adult patrons.")
- By the Book ("'By the Book' reviews professional development materials of potential interest to public librarians, trustees, and others involved in library service.")

== Website ==
Major sections in Public Libraries' Web presence include free access to selected material from the print magazine, Web-only material, and a blog. Additionally, at the American Library Association's Web site, older issues of Public Libraries are available for free in PDF format.
