= Gerald R. Shields =

- Born: November 24, 1925
- Died: November 10, 2005 (aged 79)
- Education: University of Wisconsin
- Occupations: Librarian and educator

Gerald R. Shields (1927 – November 10, 2005) was a librarian, editor, cartoonist and educator.

Shields retired as Assistant Dean of the School of Information and Library Studies at the State University of New York at Buffalo.

== Education ==
Shields received a master of arts in library science from the University of Wisconsin.

== Career ==
Shields was the founding editor of American Libraries (1968-1973) and the Ohio Library Association Bulletin. He also drew cartoons under the name Jerrybilt.

In 1973 he joined the faculty of the School of Information and Library Studies at the State University of New York at Buffalo serving as a professor and assistant dean of the school from 1975 until his retirement in 1990. He was president of the New York Library Association in 1982-1983.

Shields was the editor of feature articles in Public Libraries, the journal of the Public Library Association.

He served twelve years on the American Library Association (ALA) Council and was chair of the Professional Ethics Committee.

== Awards ==
- 1984 New York Library Association's Intellectual Freedom Award.

== Bibliography ==
- The FBI Creates An Awareness of Librarian Ethics: An Opinionated Historical (Allerton Park Institute, 1989) Review ISBN 0878450858
- Librarianship: The New Alternatives and the Old Bundle of Tricks Library Trends 32 (3) Winter 1984. pages 349-356
- Freedom of access to library materials, with John S. Robotham (Neal-Schuman, 1982) ISBN 0918212316
- Children's Library Services: School or public? (Rowman & Littlefield, 1974) ISBN 9780810806887
- Budgeting for accountability in libraries; a selection of readings with John Gordon Burke (Scarecrow Press, 1974) ISBN 0810806878
- Shields, Gerald R. (April 1992). "Censorship, Social Violence, and Librarian Ethics: A Review Article". Library Quarterly. 62: 217–22.
