= Public Library Association =

Division of the American Library Association

- Abbreviation: PLA
- Formation: 1944
- Type: Non-profit
- Headquarters: Chicago, Illinois, U.S.
- Region served: United States
- Members: 7,000
- Executive Director: Mary Davis Fournier
- Main organ: Board of Directors
- Website: Public Library Association

The Public Library Association (PLA), a division of the American Library Association, is a professional association of public librarians and supporters dedicated to the "development and effectiveness of public library staff and public library services." In keeping with this mission, the PLA provides continuing education to members, hosts a biennial professional conference, publishes a trade journal, and advocates for public libraries and literacy. The PLA was founded in 1944 and currently has over 7,000 members.

== Strategic plan ==
The strategic plan for the Public Association for 2022 to 2026, approved in June 2022, includes five objectives: Goals are:

- Equity, Diversity, Inclusion & Social Justice
- Transformation
- Professional Growth
- Advocacy
- Organizational Excellence

== Issues ==
The PLA identified the following areas as "priority concerns":

- Adequate funding for public libraries
- Improved management of public libraries
- Recognition of the importance of all library staff members in providing quality public service
- Recruitment, education, training, and compensation of public librarians
- Intellectual freedom
- Improved access to library resources
- Effective communication with the nonlibrary world.

== Governance ==
The PLA is governed by an 11-member Board of Directors elected by the association's members. The PLA Board of Directors consists of the President, President-Elect, Past-President, six Directors-at-Large, ALA Division Councilor, and PLA Executive Director. The Executive Director is an ex-officio and non-voting board member tasked with enacting the board's decisions. The PLA's current president is Sonia Alcántara-Antoine, its president-elect is Michael Lambert, and its executive director is Mary Davis Fournier. Members of PLA standing committees, award juries, task forces, and advisory groups are appointed to one- or two-year terms by the president-elect. Active committees include a Budget and Finance Committee, Every Child Ready to Read Oversight Committee, Intellectual Freedom Committee, Leadership Development Committee, Legislation and Advocacy Committee, Public Libraries Advisory Committee, and committees to manage the PLA's biennial conferences and nominate candidates for committee service.

== Publications ==
Public Libraries is the PLA's official trade magazine. Published six times annually, this magazine focuses on news and issues pertaining to public libraries and librarianship. It commenced publication in January 1947 under the editorship of Muriel E. Perry of Decatur Public Library. Public Libraries Online is the digital companion to the print journal and offers three full articles from each print issue, plus daily updates, interviews, blogging, and other exclusive content. The print magazine is a delayed open access journal; its web companion is free and open to all users. PLA is also responsible for the publication of many key monograph titles in the field of public librarianship.

== History ==
PLA was formed in 1944 as the Division of Public Libraries of the American Library Association. The formation of the Division of Public Libraries of the American Library Association was approved by the ALA Council in 1944 following petitions signed by nearly 1,200 members.

The first PLA president was Amy Winslow of Cuyahoga County Library. The first Executive Secretary (a position now known as Executive Director) was Julia Wright Merrill. The original mission of the division was to advance public library interests and to cooperate in the promotion of library service in general.

In 1971 Effie Lee Morris became the first woman and black person to serve as president of the PLA.

The PLA's First National Conference, with the theme "Serving People: Public Libraries Today and Tomorrow" was presented March 23–26, 1983 in Baltimore, Maryland. The conference chair was Charles W. Robinson. The core purposes was to strengthen public libraries and their contribution to the communities they serve.

The 2020 PLA Conference was a celebration of its 75th anniversary.

== See also ==
- American Library Association
- History of public library advocacy
- List of libraries in the United States
- Library science
- Public libraries
- Public library advocacy
- Public Libraries
