= Book truck =

Trolley used to move books

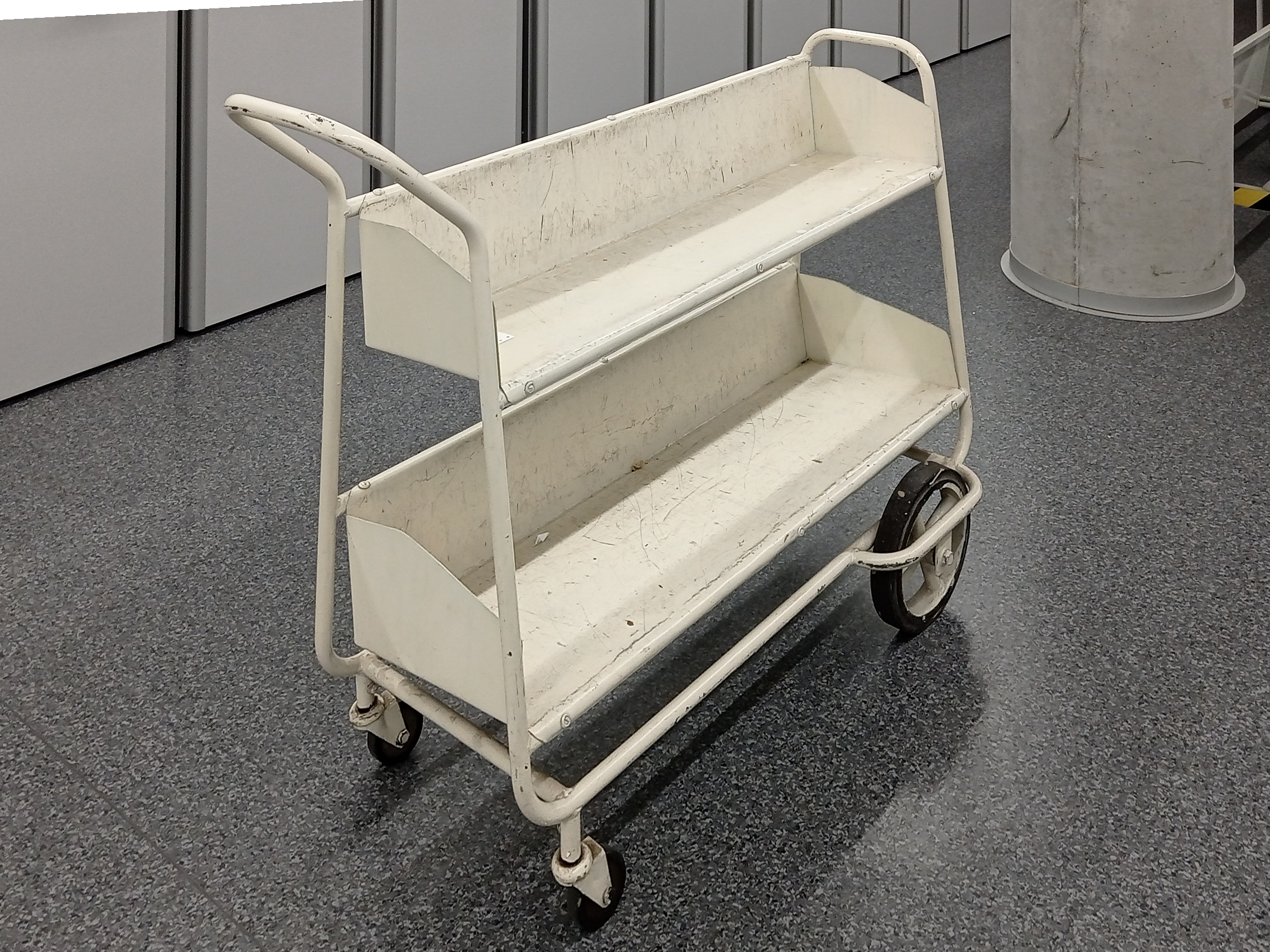
Empty book truck

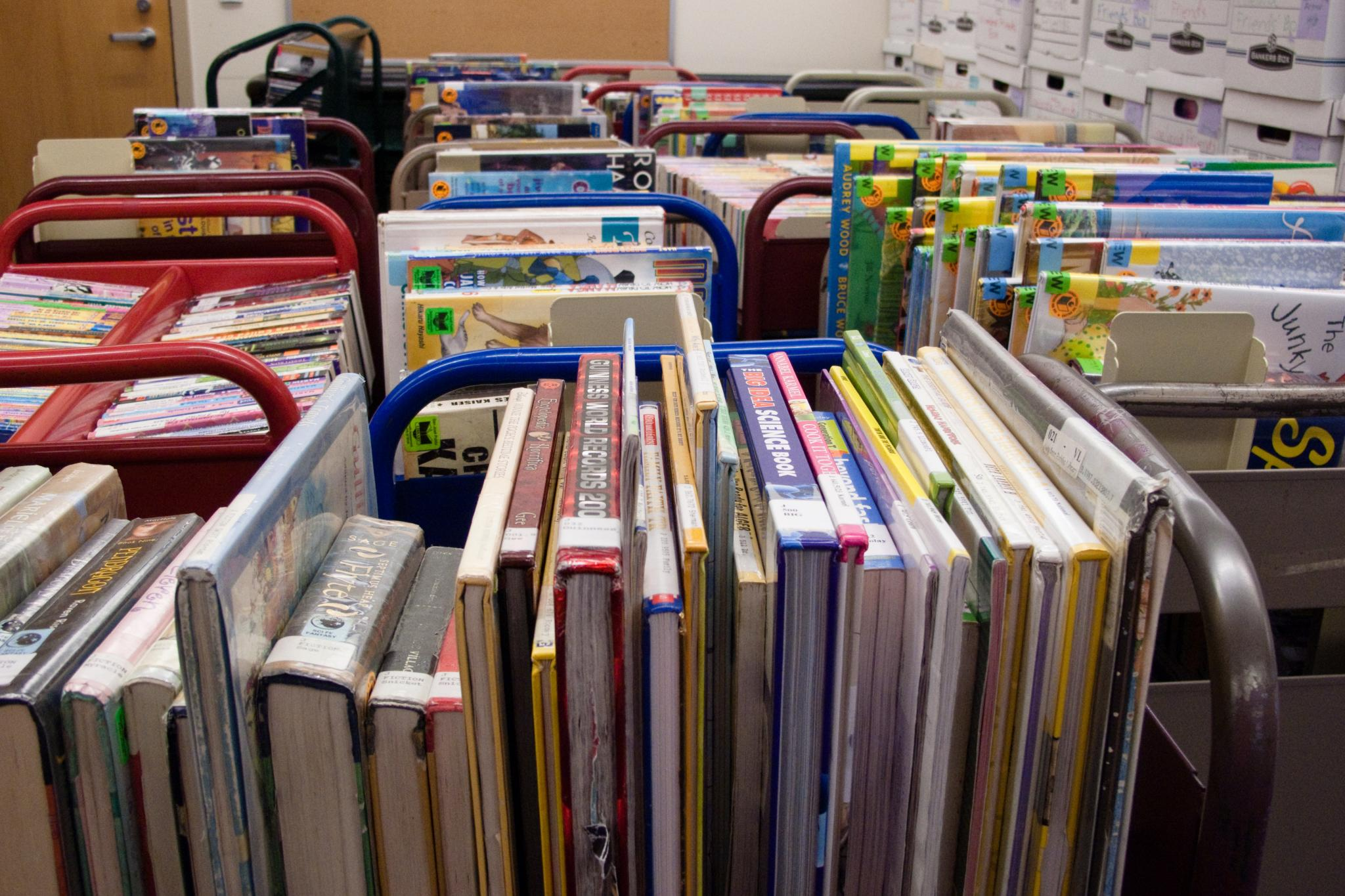
Full book trucks

A book truck, book trolley, or book cart is a small wheeled vehicle, typically with two or three shelves, used in libraries to move books. It was patented in the United States by David Edgar Hunter in 1899.

Book trucks are used to move large quantities of books. They work well when the move is in the same library. When the move is longer, the book truck may not be as useful as there may be a need to travel to different levels of a building.

The Library Book Cart Drill Team Championship takes place every year during the annual conference of the American Library Association.
