= Guerrilla librarian =

A guerrilla librarian is a person who may or may not be a professional librarian, but has otherwise taken up the stewardship of books or other material. This stewardship is usually outside the acceptance of authority figures, hence the guerrilla or underground nature of the action taken. Guerrilla librarianship can be politicized and occasionally controversial.

== Early history of guerrilla librarians, 1990s ==
With the rise of electronic resources, some more “traditional” librarians in the San Francisco Public Library system were reported to hide books to protect them from destruction. In a column in the April 1997 ALA publication American Libraries, the reference librarian Will Manley referred to these librarians as “guerrilla librarians.” The librarians attempted to save the books marked for destruction or the discard pile by stamping them with incorrect due dates.

=== Background ===
In 1987, a planning study was conducted by library consultants Becker & Hayes Inc. This study found that “The library will pursue an active 'weeding' program in the next two decades to extend the useful life of the facility... up to 50 percent of the material could be located off-site.” In 1988, Proposition A was passed by voters to provide $109.5 million for the New Main Library to double existing space and would be applied to just the new building. Other resources such as furniture and equipment had to be covered by the public-private partnership called The Library Foundation. After the October 17, 1989 earthquake in San Francisco, City Librarian Ken Dowlin applied to the Federal Emergency Management Authority for a $1 million grant. With this funding, he changed the organization of the books from the Dewey Decimal System to a system he referred to as “leveled access.”

The Mercury Project involved the purchase of new computers, including a supercomputer from the Digital Equipment Corporation (DEC) for an online Public Access Catalogue (OPAC). The Alexandrian Project aimed to build a new main library building using computers and electronic resources more than books. In 1995, 250,000 library books were weeded, including old, rare and some last copies. Some librarians resisted this idea of the “Library of the Future” that Dowlin had envisioned. This resistance to these changes created the term “guerrilla librarian,” a librarian who saves books from destruction by either hiding them or stamping them to make the books appear that they had been in recent circulation.

In the Word Watch of April 1997, The Atlantic Monthly defined guerrilla librarianship as “the use of surreptitious measures by librarians determined to resist the large-scale 'deaccessioning' of rarely used books: 'A branch librarian ... sometimes goes around with a due-date stamp, furtively stamping into currency books that she feels are imperiled.... [Employees of the San Francisco Public Library] call it “guerrilla librarianship”' (The New Yorker).”

== Current guerrilla librarianship ==
In more recent history, the term “guerrilla librarian” has been used to refer to Mick Jones of The Clash. His recent efforts in July 2009 created the Rock-n-Roll Public Library in London. Including 10,000 items from the guitarist's private collection, the library also contains Clash artwork and Beatles memorabilia. This exhibition is free as a “direct artistic challenge to the likes of the corporate British Music Experience.”

Other guerrilla librarians include organizations such as Biologists Helping Bookstores, private citizen scientists re-shelving books to prevent pseudoscience from being placed in with the science categories. In comparison to the original 1997 usage of the term, this version of guerrilla librarianship involves the removal or rearrangement of books by the general public regarding bookstores as opposed to librarians in public library settings.

== See also ==
- Public library advocacy
- History of public library advocacy
