= Library Company of Philadelphia =

Library in Pennsylvania founded by Benjamin Franklin

Coordinates: 39.94779°N 75.16306°W

- Location: 1314 Locust Street, Philadelphia, Pennsylvania, U.S.
- Established: 1731; 295 years ago

Collection
- Size: 500,000 books; 70,000 other items

Access and use
- Circulation: Non-circulating collection
- Population served: Free and open to the public
- Members: Benjamin Franklin originally

Other information
- Director: Interim
- Employees: 25
- Website: http://www.librarycompany.org/

The Library Company of Philadelphia (LCP) is a non-profit organization located on Locust Street in Center City, Philadelphia. Founded as a library in 1731 by Benjamin Franklin, the Library Company of Philadelphia has accumulated one of the most significant collections of historically valuable manuscripts and printed material in the United States. On December 2, 2025, a majority of the Library Company shareholders voted to pursue an affiliation with Temple University. This affiliation was approved by Temple.

The current collection size is approximately 500,000 books and 70,000 other items, including 2,150 items that once belonged to Franklin, major collections of 17th-century and Revolution-era pamphlets and ephemera, maps, and whole libraries assembled in the 18th and 19th centuries. The collection also includes first editions of Moby-Dick and Leaves of Grass.

== History ==
=== 18th century ===
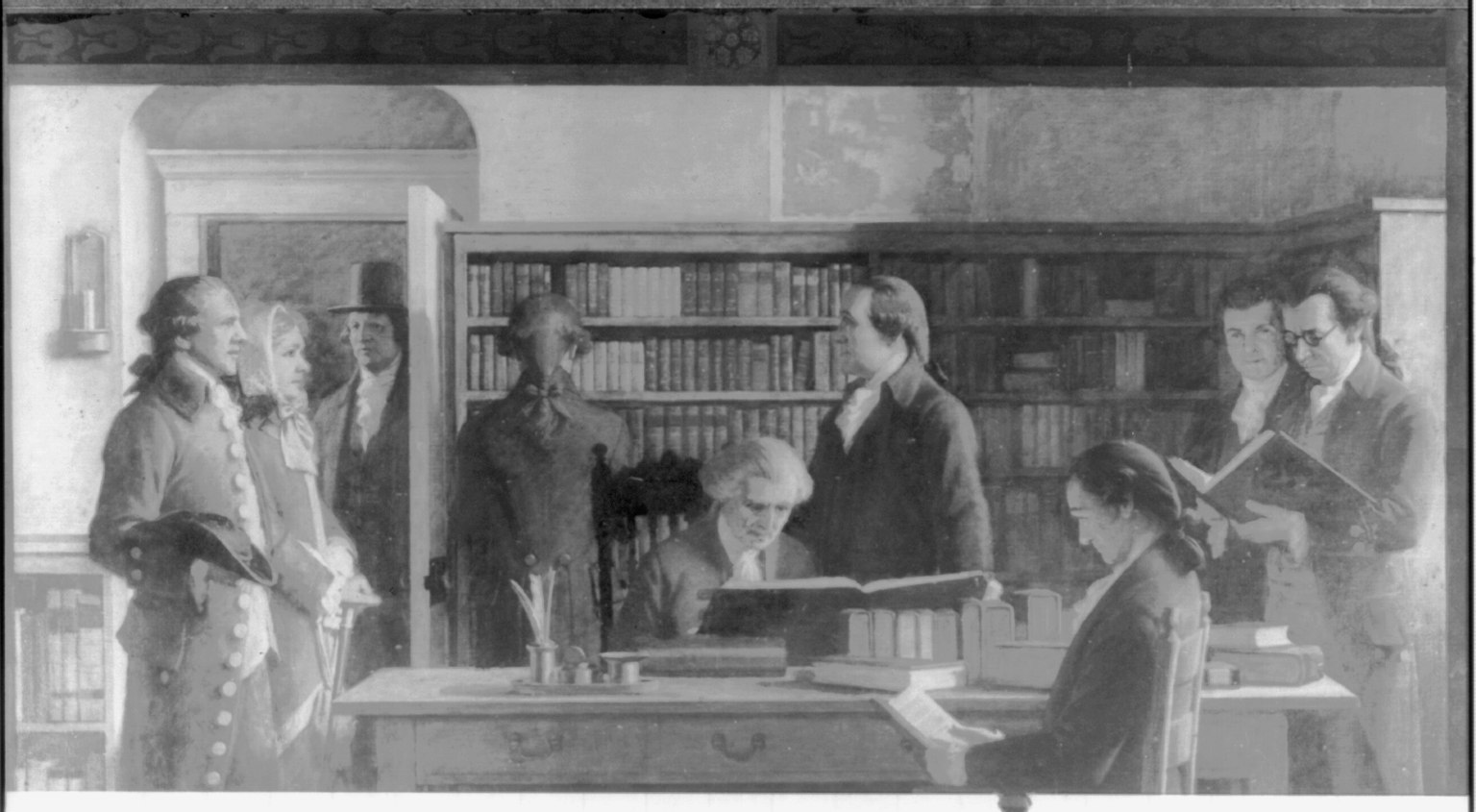
Franklin opening 1st subscription library in Phila., a 1914 illustration depicting Benjamin Franklin's role in founding the Library Company of Philadelphia now housed at the Library of Congress

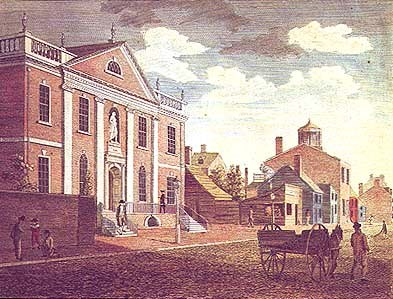
Library and Surgeon's Hall, Fifth-street, an 1800 engraving of the library by English painter William Birch

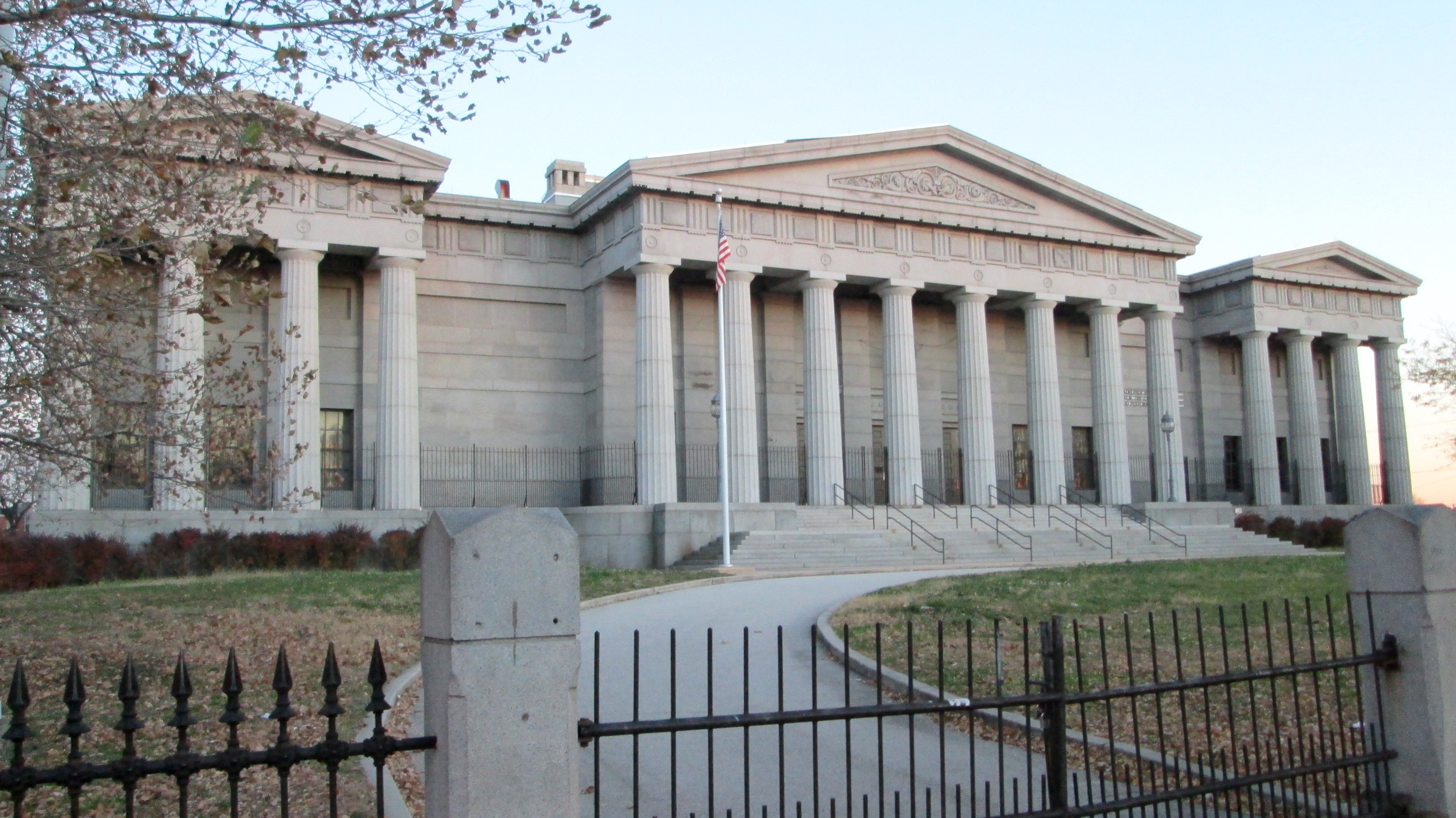
The former Ridgway Library at 901 South Broad Street, built between 1873 and 1878, has been occupied by the Philadelphia High School for the Creative and Performing Arts since 1997.

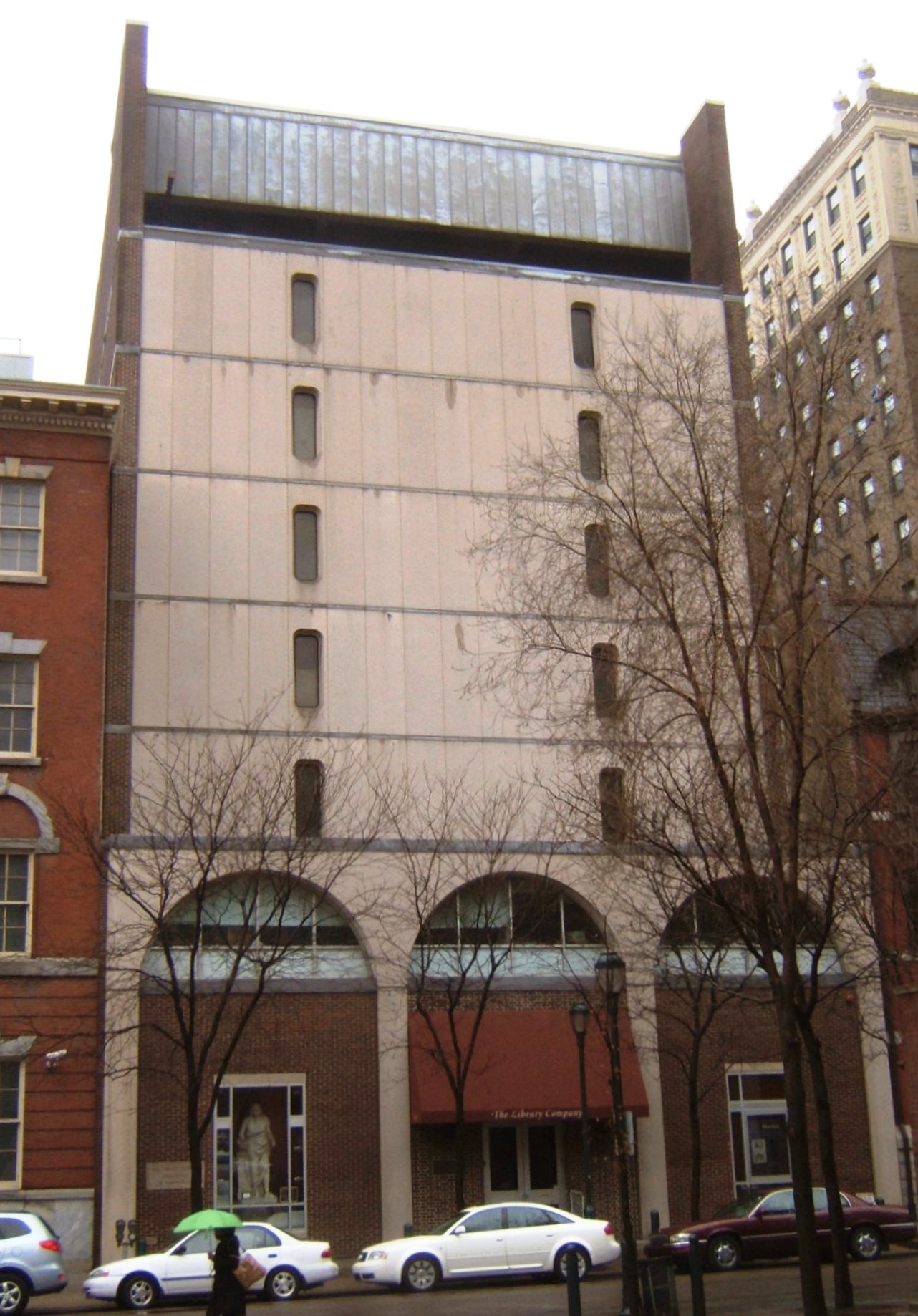
The Ridgway Library, opened in 1966, home of the Library Company of Philadelphia, at 1314 Locust Street in Philadelphia

The Library Company was an offshoot of the Junto, a discussion group in colonial Philadelphia, that gravitated around Benjamin Franklin. On July 1, 1731, Franklin and a number of his fellow members among the Junto drew up articles of agreement to found a library, for they had discovered that their far-ranging conversations on intellectual and political themes floundered at times on a point of fact that might be found in a decent library. In colonial era Province of Pennsylvania at the time, books from London booksellers were expensive to purchase and slow to arrive. Franklin and his friends were mostly of moderate means, and none alone could have afforded a representative library. By pooling their resources in pragmatic Franklinian fashion, as the Library Company's historian wrote, "the contribution of each created the book capital of all." Many of the first books in the collection focused on religion and education. It is notable that the collection was in English, when during the period most books held in academic and private libraries were only found in Latin.

Louis Timothee, the first librarian hired, was also the first librarian hired in America. He only held the position for a brief time. Franklin soon took over his duties until another librarian was found to replace him. Franklin's stint as librarian ended in 1734, when he was replaced by William Parsons, the librarian for the next 12 years. Robert Greenway, whose tenure lasted until 1763, was the fourth librarian.

The articles of association specified that each member after the first fifty must be approved by the directors, sign the articles, and pay the subscription. Admitting new members and selecting new books were the directors' ordinary duties.

In the back of the library's 1741 catalog, Franklin mentioned that the library was accessible to people who were not members. Those who were not members were allowed to borrow books. However, they had to leave enough money to cover the cost of the book. Apparently, their money was given back upon returning the book. The privilege of being a member meant that books could be borrowed for free. Franklin also mentioned that the library was only open on Saturdays, for four hours in the afternoon.

On November 10, 1731, at Nicholas Scull's Bear Tavern ten persons paid their forty shillings: Robert Grace (share no. 1), Thomas Hopkinson (share no. 2), Benjamin Franklin (share no. 3), John Jones, Jr. (4), Joseph Breintnall (5), Anthony Nicholas (6), Thomas Godfrey (7), Joseph Stretch (8), Philip Syng, Jr. (9), and John Sober (10). It was a disappointing turnout: all but John Sober and the hatter Joseph Stretch, son of Peter Stretch, who later became a Pennsylvania assemblyman, were officers. The library then had eleven paid members. Joseph Stretch and his brothers provided half of the original capital to build Pennsylvania Hospital, another of Benjamin Franklin's projects.

Over time, 50 subscribers invested 40 shillings each and promised to pay ten shillings a year thereafter to buy books and maintain a shareholder's library. Therefore, "the Mother of all American subscription libraries" was established, and a list of desired books compiled in part by James Logan, "the best Judge of Books in these parts," was sent to London. By autumn, the first books were on the shelves.

Earlier libraries in the Thirteen Colonies belonged to gentlemen, members of the clergy, and colleges. Members of the Library Company soon opened their own book presses to make donations: A Collection of Several Pieces, by John Locke; Logic: or, the Art of Thinking, by the Port Royalists Antoine Arnauld and Pierre Nicole, which Franklin in his autobiography said he had read at the age of 16; Plutarch's Moralia translated by Philemon Holland; Lewis Roberts' Merchants Mappe of Commerce, and others. A bit later William Rawle added a set of Spenser's Works to the collection and Francis Richardson gave several volumes, among them Francis Bacon's Sylva Sylvarum, but on the whole books in Latin were few.

Overtures to the proprietor of Pennsylvania, John Penn at Pennsbury at first elicited no more than a polite response, but an unsolicited gift of 34 pounds sterling arrived in the summer of 1738 from Walter Sydserfe, a Scottish-born physician and planter of Antigua.

The earliest surviving printed catalogue of 1741 gives the range of readers' tastes, for the members' requirements shaped the collection. Excluding gifts, a third of the holdings of 375 titles were historical works, geographies and accounts of voyages and travels, a category the Library Company has collected energetically throughout its history. A fifth of the titles were literature, mostly in the form of poetry and plays, for the prose novel was still in its infancy: as late as 1783, in the first orders from London after the war years, the directors thought "we should not think it expedient to add to our present stock, anything in the novel way." Another fifth of the titles were devoted to works of science. Theology and sermons, however, accounted for only a tenth of the titles, which set the Free Library apart from collegiate libraries at Harvard and Yale. Another tenth was works of philosophy, and the rest (approximately 1/15 of the collection) was "economics and such social sciences, the arts, linguistics, and the indefinables." The Company's agent in London was Peter Collinson, Fellow of the Royal Society, the Quaker mercer-naturalist of London, who corresponded with John Bartram.

The Library Company's example was soon imitated in other cities along the Atlantic coast, from Salem to Charleston. The Library soon became a repository of other curiosities: antique coins, including a gift of Roman coins from a Tory Member of Parliament, fossils, natural history specimens, minerals. When John Penn, making up for his slow start, sent an air-pump to the learned society in 1739, the directors commissioned a glazed cabinet to house it, the earliest extant example of American-made Palladian architectural furniture. Rooms on the second floor of the newly finished west wing of the State House, later renamed Independence Hall, housed the Library and its collections. During the 1740s, Franklin and his associates performed their first experiments in electricity at the State House and Benjamin West later sent his mummified hand of an Egyptian princess from there.

A charter was issued for the Company by the Penn proprietors, March 24, 1742, that included a plot of land, issued in their name by George Thomas, governor of the Province of Pennsylvania. Collinson, who had faithfully executed the Company's requests for books over the years, sent windfalls in 1755 and in 1758 in the form of boxes of his own copies of a score of 17th-century accounts of the newly established British colonies in America, among them such classics as Strachey's Lawes, Mourt's Relation and John Smith's General Historie of Virginia.

The Library Company's microscope and telescope were frequently borrowed and from time to time, needed repairs. There is also evidence that many of the library's curiosities were available to borrow if permission was obtained from any two directors. In 1769, Owen Biddle used the telescope to observe the transit of Venus from Cape Henlopen. On May 9 of that year Sarah Wistar became the first woman to be voted a library share.

The library absorbed smaller lending libraries and outgrew its rooms, renting larger space on the second floor of the new Carpenters' Company hall in 1773. "The Books (inclosed within Wire Lattices) are kept in one large Room," Franklin was informed in London, "and in another handsome Apartment the [scientific] Apparatus is deposited and the Directors meet." On September 5, 1774, the First Continental Congress met on the first floor of Carpenters' Hall, and the Library Company extended members' privileges to all the delegates. The offer was renewed when the Second Continental Congress met the following spring, and again when the delegates to the Constitutional Convention met in 1787. Nine signers of the Declaration of Independence—Benjamin Franklin, Benjamin Rush, Francis Hopkinson, Robert Morris, George Clymer, John Morton, James Wilson, Thomas McKean, and George Ross—owned shares, some of them serving as directors. The Library Company served virtually as the Library of Congress until the national capital was established in 1800.

Virtually every significant work on political theory, history, law, and statecraft (and much else besides) could be found on the Library Company's shelves, as well as numerous tracts and polemical writings by American as well as European authors. And virtually all of those works that were influential in framing the minds of the Framers of the nation are still on the Library Company's shelves.

In 1785, the Company purchased a collection of Revolutionary broadsheets, pamphlets and other ephemera that had been assiduously collected by Pierre Eugène Du Simitière, of which no other copies have survived.

Permanent quarters were established for the Library Company in 1789 with the purchase of a lot on Fifth Street near Chestnut across from State House Square. A competition for the design of a building was won by an amateur of architecture, Dr. William Thornton, with a plan for a Palladian red-brick structure with white pilasters and a pediment interrupting a balustraded roof. A curving double flight of steps led up to the arched door under an arched niche containing a gift from William Bingham—a marble statue of Franklin in a classical toga sculpted in Italy by Francesco Lazzarini. Member's shares were extended to carpenters and bricklayers in partial payment for work on the new building. The new quarters were opened on New Year's Day, 1791. For the new library Samuel Jennings, an expatriate Philadelphian living in London, painted a large picture, Liberty Displaying the Arts and Sciences.

In 1792, the Loganian Library, which had been housed across the square, was transferred to the Library Company, complementing its collection with 2,600 books, primarily in Latin and Greek, which had been collected by James Logan. This collection was supplemented by the medical library of James Logan's younger brother, a physician in Bristol, England, the best medical library in North America. Thornton's new building immediately required a new wing.

=== 19th century ===
The collections went from strength to strength in the 19th century. In the mid-19th century, it was considered one of the "five great libraries" in the United States, along with the Harvard University Library, Yale University Library, Library of Congress, and Boston Athenæum.

The Library Company's collections were physically split in the mid-19th century. A large bequest from Dr. James Rush resulted in a new building at Broad and Christian streets in South Philadelphia. The Ridgway Library, as it was called, was controversial because it was both physically and socially removed from the homes and businesses of its members. A new, more centrally located, library designed by Frank Furness opened its doors in 1880 at Juniper and Locust Street.

An unrelated endeavor, the Free Library of Philadelphia, was chartered in 1891 to "be free to all", and opened in March 1894.

=== 20th century ===
The Library Company suffered financial troubles during the Great Depression and was forced to sell the Locust Street building and consolidate the collections in the Ridgway Library on South Broad Street. As its fortunes improved after the war, the institution focused on its mission as a scholarly research library. In the second half of the 20th century, under the direction of Edwin Wolf II, an energetic program of renewal brought the Library Company once more into a busy and vital center of national importance for research and education. The Library Company completed a new building on Locust Street, also named the Ridgway Library, in 1965, and opened it to the public in April 1966.

== See also ==
- Free Library of Philadelphia
- History of public library advocacy
- Life in Philadelphia
- Public library advocacy
