= Public library advocacy =

Activism to support public libraries

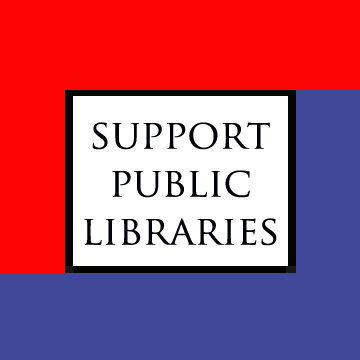
Public Library Advocacy Logo

Public library advocacy is support given to a public library for its financial and philosophical goals or needs. Most often this takes the form of monetary or material donations or campaigning to the institutions which oversee the library. Originally, library advocacy was centered on the library itself, but current trends show libraries positioning themselves to demonstrate they provide "economic value to the community".

== Forms ==
=== Letter-writing campaigns ===
Letter writing campaigns are chiefly intended to inform law makers, library officials, and citizens about the ramifications of decisions regarding public libraries and to promote library-related causes.

Letter writing has been a valuable form of communication among public library advocates. A well-timed and hand-crafted email or strategically sent letter can be a potent mechanism used to sway the decisions of elected officials and the masses. Letters are practical because they can be distributed to many individuals and can serve as representation for public library advocates who cannot attend crucial meetings or rallies.

=== Programs ===
Public libraries frequently use programming to increase awareness of the valuable services and resources that they offer to the community. Some of these programs offer information and educational resources for library advocates and librarians while others are directed towards increasing public knowledge of library services and resources.

- Library Card Sign-up Month is celebrated in September as a part of The Smartest Card campaign. During Library Card Sign-up Month, the library card is frequently promoted as the most important card that individuals can have in their wallets. Library Card Sign-Up Month is a popular program across the United States. The ALA logo for the Smartest Card campaign is, “The Smartest Card. Get it. Use it. @ your library”.
- "Turning the Page: Building Your Library Community" is an advocacy education and training program funded by the Bill and Melinda Gates Foundation. Courses are available both online and in person and are designed to give library advocates access to the training, skills, and resources to better advocate for their library’s funding needs.”
- Toolkits: Frontline Advocacy is an ALA toolkit that provides librarians and library workers with the advocacy tools and support they need to advocate for their own libraries and the profession. It is intended for public, school, academic, and special libraries. The Frontline Advocacy for Public Libraries Toolkit offers a variety of helpful resources including information about blogging, speech making, and data collecting. Advocating in a Tough Economy is a response to difficult economic situations when the library is simultaneously increasing patronage while losing tax based funding. Its toolkit contains, “resources and tools, including news clips, op-eds, and statistics to help library supporters make the case for libraries in tough economic times.” The CLA also provides a Copyright Grassroots Advocacy Kit to address Bill C-32, An Act to amend the Copyright Act. The contents of this kit are "a list of 8 key messages, a sample form letter to your MP, a guide for holding an in-person meeting, and a link to find contact information for your MP. The kit also contains background information, including the latest CLA Position Statement “Protecting the Public Interest in the Digital World: the views of the Canadian Library Association/Association canadienne des bibliothèques on Bill C-32, An Act to amend the Copyright Act." The Australian Library and Information Association offers the Every Member An Advocate kit beginning in September 2010 to complement their Every Member An Advocate workshops, which offers advocacy tools and approaches in all sectors.
- Banned Books Week takes place every year during the last week of September and brings attention to the library’s mission of supporting intellectual freedom and the importance of the First Amendment. “Observed since 1982, this annual ALA event reminds Americans not to take this precious democratic freedom for granted.” Since 2006, the Canadian Library Association has surveyed library resources and policies challenges. In September 2010, libraries in the United Kingdom joined together to celebrate intellectual freedom by creating and publicizing Banned Books activities. Amnesty International, a human rights organization "directs attention to the plight of individuals who are persecuted because of the writings that they produce, circulate or read."
- El Día de los Niños is a celebration of children, families and reading that is held on April 30. This celebration “emphasizes the importance of advocating literacy for children of all linguistic and cultural backgrounds.”
- "Every Child Ready to Read @ Your Library" is a joint project of the Public Library Association and the Association for Library Service to Children Programs, which helps provide parents with tools to help them in, “their critical role as their child’s first teacher."

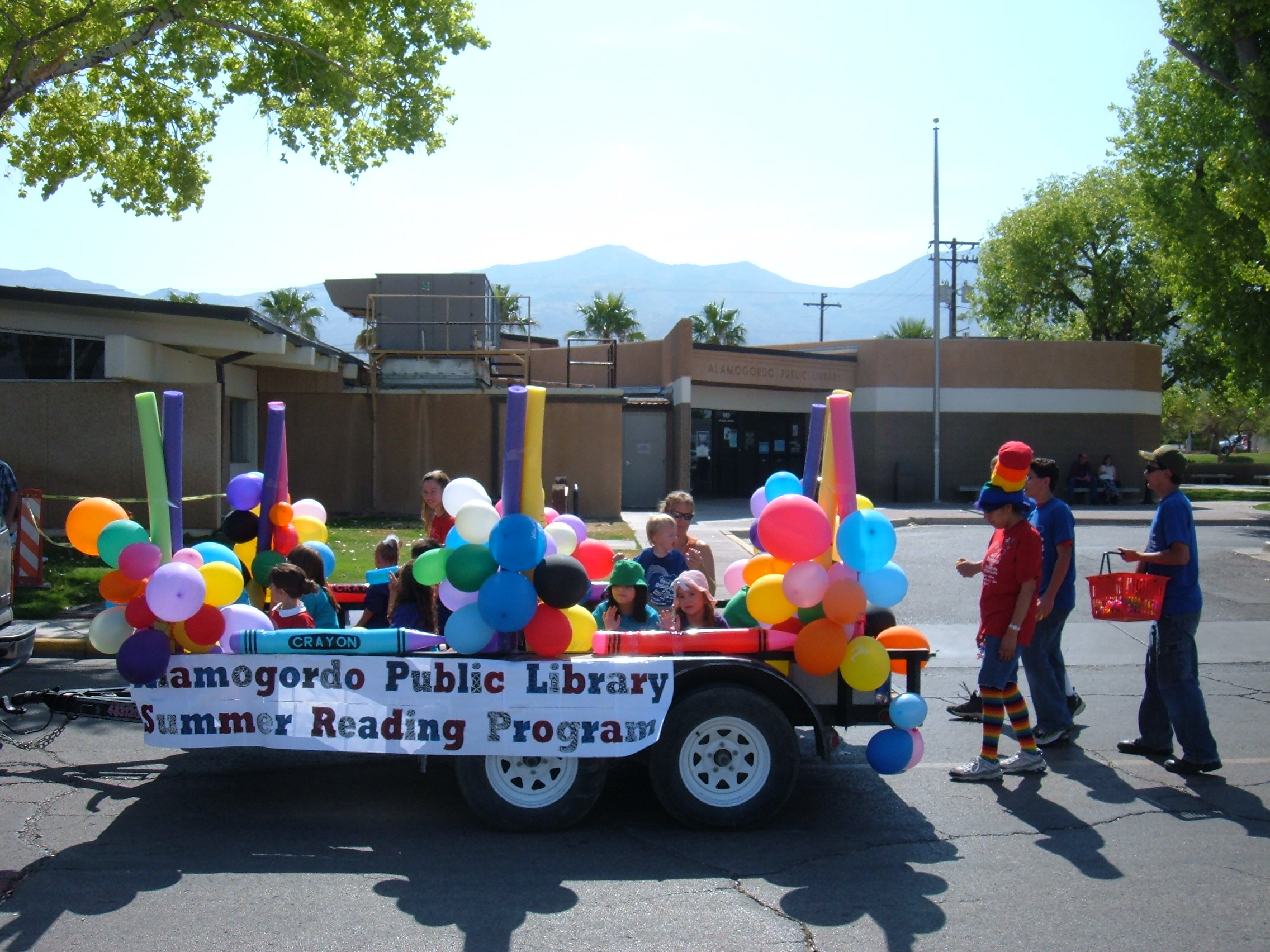
The Alamogordo Public Library in New Mexico advocates for their summer reading program in the 2007 Independence Day Parade.

- Summer reading programs meet in many public libraries to support education and literacy while children are on summer breaks from school. Benefits of a Summer Reading Program include “encouragement that reading become[s] a lifelong habit”, “[influencing] reluctant readers [to] be drawn in by the [library's] activities”, “[helping] children keep their [academic] skills up [during the summer break]”, and “[generating] interest in the library and books.” Summer Reading Programs generate important parent and child involvement with libraries and literacy.
- Canadian Library Month is sponsored by the Canadian Library Association/Association canadienne des bibliothèques.

=== Public demonstrations ===
Public demonstrations for libraries often take the form of rallies, protests, and read-ins.

==== Rallies ====
Rallies in support of public libraries are usually positive events designed to bring people together and raise awareness of issues facing public libraries. They are generally organized by professional library staff or by organizations such as the American Library Association (ALA). Effective rallies are well-organized and paint a clear and compelling picture of the issues facing a library and specific actions to be taken to reach specific goals. Typical rally activities include musical performances and public speeches. Rally organizers will frequently distribute fliers containing brief statements of facts supporting the objective of the rally that are designed to be quickly digested by interested passers-by. Rally participants typically signify solidarity by wearing the same t-shirt or dressing in similar colors. Rally organizers often have stickers, leaflets, or other promotional items to give to participants and passers-by to help publicize the issue at hand.

On June 29, 2010, more than 1600 supporters showed up for the Library Advocacy Day Rally organized by the American Library Association. Speakers included authors, members of Congress, and the ALA Executive Director.

==== Public protest ====
Whereas rallies are generally a positive event to achieve a goal, protests are usually held in reaction to a negative event, such as drastic changes in library services, staff lay-offs, or branch closings. They are often organized by Friends groups, community members, or library unions and are usually last-ditch efforts to stop a proposed action. Most public protests for libraries involve picketing the legislative body that made the final or proposed decisions, in hopes that a large public outcry will cause elected officials to reconsider. Others involve picketing outside a library branch or in a place with high traffic to draw the public’s awareness to the issues at hand.

==== Read-ins ====
A particular type of public demonstration almost exclusively used to support libraries, read-ins can take two different forms. The simplest one is when supporters of a library simply meet en masse and read their own books. Usually this type of read-in is held at or near the supported library or the targeted legislative body. Indianapolis library lovers organized a read-in during July 2010 to protest drastic budget cuts that would have closed 6 branches.

The other type of read-in involves volunteers reading aloud for a specified amount of time, usually 24 hours. These are also often held near the targeted legislative body or the supported library. Volunteers usually read books of their choice for their allotted time span, and then are replaced by another volunteer reading a different book. New York activists held this type of read-in June 2010 as part of their “We Will Not Be Shushed” campaign to stave off proposed budget cuts.

==== Parades ====
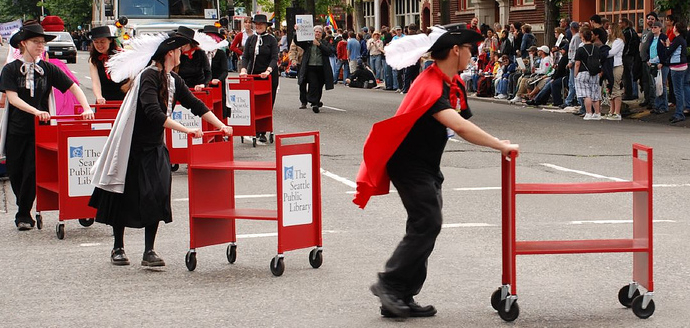
Parade, Seattle, Washington, 2007

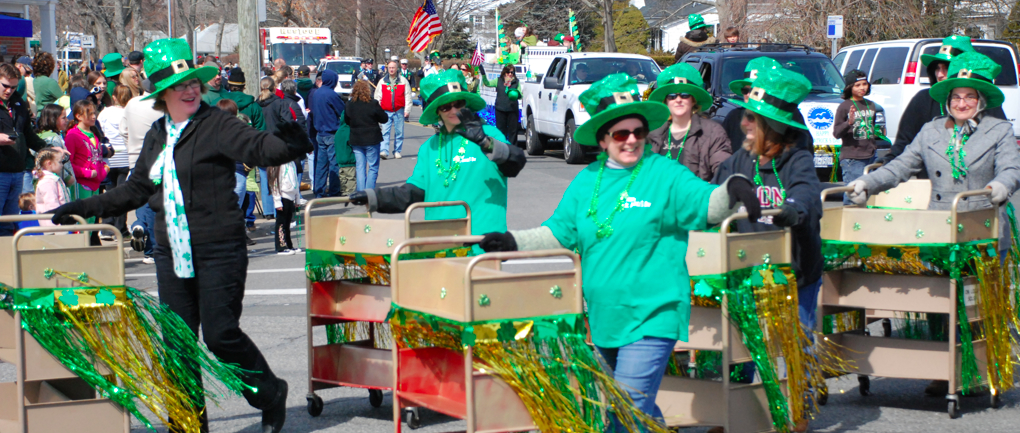
Parade, Southampton, New York, 2009

===== Book cart drill team =====
A book cart drill team refers to a group of library employees (typically librarians and library technicians) who perform in public choreographed routines with wheeled carts. Participants generally aim to demonstrate esprit de corps and/or precision of movement. Teams exist throughout the United States, including Colorado, Connecticut, Delaware, Florida, Illinois, Massachusetts, Ohio, Pennsylvania, and Texas. Since 2004 the "Library Book Cart Drill Team Championship" has taken place during the annual conference of the American Library Association.

=== Meetings with elected officials ===
Some advocates decide to appeal to those in power to help with library issues and trends. The

If an advocacy group is searching for relevant officials to contact, the ALA has a listing.

The Library Advocacy Day is an annual spring event in which library supporters travel to Washington, D.C., to meet with congressional offices.

== Types of advocates ==
=== Grassroots campaigns ===
Grassroots advocates participate in movements or campaigns to promote or support libraries that are frequently led by library staff or members of the local community. These groups are not necessarily part of an organization like Friends of Libraries and are often run independently. Activities can include: demonstrations; promotion through letter-writing, email, or word-of-mouth; fund-raising; and social networking.

Various resources are available for those who want to lobby for support of their local library. Elsevier Training Desk provides a Lobbying Grassroots Checklist and the American Library Association offers help with framing a message to use when advocating for the library, among other resources. Another tool in grassroots advocacy is Save Libraries. “Save Libraries is a grassroots effort to compile information and advocacy resources for libraries that are facing devastating budget cuts” and offers resources, tools, and information regarding library advocacy.

“The need for public support of libraries never diminishes. In critical times, advocacy moves right to the top of the priority list of support activities. Having a solid advocacy program is essential to any library.”

=== Friends of the Library ===
Friends of the Library are nonprofit organizations that have the goal of helping a specific library. The members often volunteer their time or resources on behalf of that library. Friends groups are very diverse, including Friends of state libraries, individual libraries, library systems, teen Friends, and even Friends foundations. The first “Friends of the Library” group was founded in Paris in 1913 as a support group for the Bibliothèque Nationale. and was approved by the state in 1927. In October 1995, the name of the group was changed from la Société des Amis de la Bibliothèque Nationale (Friends Society of the National Library) to l'Association des Amis de la BnF (Association of Friends of the BnF). Friends of public libraries have traditionally raised money through book sales, bake sales, and similar fundraisers. Moneys raised from these efforts often go toward library programs, supplies and collections. Friends can also be instrumental in lobbying politicians and informing the public about legislation that may be beneficial or detrimental to their library.

In 1979, the Friends of Libraries U.S.A. (FOLUSA) was created to formalize the loose national network of Friends groups, increasing their potential to promote libraries. FOLUSA joined with the American Library Trustee Association (ALTA) in 2008 to form a new American Library Association (ALA) division, the Association for Library Trustees, Advocates, Friends, and Foundations (ALTAFF). ALTAFF provides resources for Friends groups seeking to advocate for their libraries in new ways.

== Advocacy organizations ==
Although the International Federation of Library Associations and Institutions (IFLA) does not have a distinct advocacy group or committee within their organization, their Public Libraries Section is intended to provide "an active international forum for the development and promotion of public libraries which serve the whole community in the context of the information society and ensure free and equal access to information at the local level". The IFLA does, however, participate in the Campaign for the World's Libraries (@your Library), launched in 2001, with the American Library Association and libraries across the world "to showcase the unique and vital roles played by public, school, academic and special libraries worldwide". The campaign aims "to raise awareness about the variety of programs and services offered; to increase use of libraries at schools, at colleges and universities, in government, at work, and in daily community life; to increase funding for libraries; to involve librarians as stakeholders on public policy issues such as intellectual freedom, equity of access and the digital divide; to encourage librarianship as a profession".

=== Canada ===
The Canadian Library Association/Association canadienne des bibliothèques advocates to the federal government on the issues of public policy and funding, with particular interest for the areas of literacy, privacy, and access to information for print-disabled Canadians.

=== France ===
In France, the Association of Friends of the BnF(l'Association des Amis de la BnF) is led by a Board of Directors who are elected by the General Assembly for renewable terms of three years.

=== Italy ===
The Italian Library Association's work group on advocacy strives to build on the work done by the IFLA in Italian libraries in the areas of public relations, librarian professional development, and demonstration of the benefit of libraries to the cultural and educational aspects of society.

=== South Africa ===
The Library and Information Association of South Africa (LIASA) was founded in 1997 and is a"professional non-profit organisation, uniting and representing all institutions and people working in libraries and information services in South Africa. It strives to unite, develop and empower all people in the library and information field into an organisation [sic] that provides dynamic leadership in transforming, developing and sustaining library and information services for all people in South Africa". A branch is located in each province of the country, and one of the interest groups is dedicated to public and community libraries and lists advocacy for libraries and librarians as two of its objectives in its constitution.

=== United Kingdom ===
The Library Campaign formed in 1984 leads Friends groups nationally as well as other user advocacy routes. "Voices for the Library", a UK-based public library advocacy campaign, was started in August 2010, by a group of library and informational professionals to campaign against proposed closures to UK public libraries. It is supported by individuals and professional groups, including CILIP, Special Libraries Association Europe (SLA Europe), and UNISON. A website was started in September 2010 providing views on the importance of libraries, and a list of libraries threatened with closure. Voices for the Library helped organise a "Save our libraries" day of action on 5 February 2011. The group closed in 2017.

=== United States ===
==== American Library Association ====
American Library Association (ALA) Logo

The American Library Association (ALA) is one of the largest national associations which advocates for public libraries. ALA was founded in 1876 and since then has given libraries a more unified way to discuss, plan, and develop cooperative initiatives. “Advocacy for library support at local, state, and national levels throughout the twentieth century was orchestrated by the ALA and the National Commission on Libraries and Information Services, with countless hours contributed by members of associations” ALA has an Office for Library Advocacy that “supports the efforts of advocates seeking to improve libraries of all types by developing resources, a peer-to-peer advocacy network, and training for advocates at the local, state and national level”.

In 2001, ALA started its public awareness campaign initiative called The Campaign for America’s Libraries to further help promote the value of libraries and librarians. “Thousands of libraries of all types – across the country and around the globe - use the Campaign’s @ your library brand. The Campaign is made possible in part by ALA’s Library Champions".

- The Public Library Association

In 1944, the Division of Public Libraries was formed within ALA and merged with the Library Extension Division in 1950 to become the Public Library Division. This division was reorganized and became the Public Library Association (PLA) in 1958. Today, it is the overarching association for most public librarians in the United States, and its main aim is to “strengthen public libraries and their contribution to the communities they serve”.

==== Institute of Museum and Library Services ====
The Institute of Museum and Library Services (IMLS) is one of the main sources of federal support for the United States’ 123,000 libraries and 17,500 museums. According to the IMLS website, its mission is to “create strong libraries and museums that connect people to information and ideas. The Institute works at the national level and in coordination with state and local organizations to sustain heritage, culture, and knowledge; enhance learning and innovation; and support professional development”. Through this agency, “libraries and museums have converged as cultural heritage institutions with a renewed commitment to collaborative engagement within local and world communities”.

==== Chief Officers of State Library Associations ====
The Chief Officers of State Library Associations (COSLA) is an independent organization (that engages in some forms of advocacy for public libraries) of the chief officers of state and territorial agencies and is “designated as the state library administrative agency and is responsible for statewide library development. Its purpose is to identify and address issues of common concern and national interest; to further state library agency relationships with federal government and national organizations; and to initiate cooperative action for the improvement of library services to the people of the United States”.

==== State associations ====
Each state has a state library agency which distributes federal library funds received from the IMLS. “There are fifty-seven state and regional library association chapters affiliated with the American Library Association, each including at least a committee or section that addresses public library issues. Generally these associations hold an annual conference, as well as ongoing workshops and programs. The five largest chapters are: Texas, Ohio, New York, Illinois, and Indiana”. State Library Associations “support the establishment of public libraries, and stand out as catalysts for a great deal of the motivation for public library cooperation". State library agencies began to be founded in the 1890s and have since worked to encourage public library development, and "have come to play an increasingly larger role in enhancing library cooperation, extension, and collaboration”.

== Subjects of advocacy ==
=== Local ===
Advocacy for public libraries at the local level has been demonstrated to be an effective partial defense against library cuts and closings. Local library governing bodies are at the mercy of state and local governments with regard to funding and thus are often required to make decisions based on factors other than what is best for the community where the library is located. As a result, advocacy at the local level often requires a three-pronged plan of attack requiring a lobbying effort at the state, local, and library governing body level.

There are several ways individuals can act as advocates at the local level. These include:

- speaking to local groups about library needs and issues;
- talking to friends about the library, its role in the community, and its needs;
- writing letters to the editor of the local newspaper and to local and state representatives;
- speaking at local governmental and library board budget hearings; and
- contributing to a library publication and having the publication sent to local and state representatives.

There are many online resources for those interested in learning who their representatives at the local and state levels are. These include the American Library Association Issues and Advocacy page as well as the Library of Congress Newspaper and Current Periodical Reading Room.

=== State ===
Public library advocacy may be a collective voice from public libraries and their supporters throughout an entire state and may be directed toward state government bodies or the state's general population. Allocation of taxpayer money to support vital community programs, including public libraries, in the United States is the responsibility of state and local governments rather than the federal government; however, ever since the 1980s when the power to allocate tax dollars for such services was handed down to state and local governments, competition for tax dollars has become fierce and has caused budget problems in a number of states. With state budget issues and the fact that "statewide legislation cannot usually be passed through the efforts of one library alone," a public library will often work with library associations or with other libraries within the state to have its voice heard and gain financial and legislative support.

State library associations play a major role in advocating the importance of public libraries and the services they offer. Such associations in the United States are affiliated with the American Library Association (ALA) and are thus considered ALA chapters representing all libraries within their respective geographic coverage. State library associations facilitate connections between libraries and state government. Their websites provide contact information about and links to state legislators. Many of these websites also use Capwiz, an online advocacy tool that provides a means to learn about and communicate with elected officials as well as awareness of relevant issues in government and of relevant news in the media. To ensure awareness of legislation that may affect libraries, a state library association may hire a lobbyist who will keep a close eye on legislation in the state capitol, influence legislators on behalf of libraries statewide, and keep the association updated on what is happening in state government. The lobbyist, however, cannot be solely responsible for the lobbying effort; thus, state library associations often organize legislative committees headed by librarians from different parts of each state. State library associations also work with state libraries, whose budgets directly affect local libraries, to maintain their awareness of important amendments and bills; this cooperation is especially essential in states where state libraries are prohibited from influencing legislation.

Statewide library events also serve to advocate public libraries. On February 11, 2004, Bookmobile Day was held in Frankfort, Kentucky, in which 70 bookmobiles arrived at the state capitol to celebrate 50 years of bookmobile and outreach services throughout the state and to reinforce the importance of public library services to all Kentuckians. A number of state library associations, including those in Missouri, California, Massachusetts, and the state of Washington, hold Library Legislative Day, an advocacy event inviting library supporters statewide to meet and speak with state legislators. On Library Snapshot Day, another advocacy event, "... libraries of all types across a state, region, system or community [show] what happens in a single day in their libraries. ... This initiative provides an easy means to collect statistics, photos and stories that [enable] library advocates to prove the value of their libraries to decision-makers and increase public awareness." As of October 2010, as many as 34 states have held a Library Snapshot Day in their libraries.

=== National ===
National advocates like the American Library Association advocate for library issues to the United States Congress. The American Library Association gets involved with the national debate to ensure that all people have access to the information and services they need. ALA has used librarians to testify before Congress about civil liberties and national security, and they also advocate federal legislation that preserves and promotes fundamental library values by lobbying Congress, partnering and working with others "inside the Beltway" and beyond, and engaging in grassroots advocacy on behalf of the public.

Legislation that ALA has advocated for the public:

- Children's Internet Protection Act (CIPA)
- Consumer Product Safety Improvement Act
- Education and Literacy Legislation
- Library Services and Technology Act (LSTA)
- The USA PATRIOT Act

The Library Business Association meets with elected officials to share with them some of the key issues of interest to the library business community, such as library funding legislation.

The Public Library Association advocates for the public library and has a training program called Turning the Page for national advocacy that has been funded by the Bill and Malinda Gates Foundation.

== Achievements ==
=== South Carolina Public Libraries ===
In June 2010, South Carolina library advocates and their allies got Governor Mark Sanford's vetoes 31 and 92 of state aid to libraries overturned in less than one week.

Governor Sanford vetoed $4,653,933 in state aid to public libraries and $1,172,758 in stimulus funds to public libraries. "In his veto message, Sanford said he had decided 'that fully funding local libraries does not rise to the level of many of our other core services such as law enforcement and health care'. Sanford said that libraries are also supported by lottery funds, and suggested that counties raise other money for the libraries".

Librarians and advocates got on the phone and the computer, contacting their legislators using the state's version of CapWiz. South Carolina State Library Director David Goble states that "in less than 2 hours of receiving news of the Governor’s veto, public library leadership was taking action. In less than 24 hours, a significant and effective effort by public library directors, patrons, trustees, friends groups, citizens, etc. was well underway. The issue was being discussed in the media (print and TV) within 5 days (including a weekend). The $5,826,691 will come and it will go. The spirit of collaboration and the sense of accomplishment are ours forever. The effectiveness of our efforts is clearly demonstrated in the numbers of votes received in support of overriding the vetoes". When the representatives got up to speak, the first words were, "the libraries are needed because people need their Internet connection in order to get back to work," Goble also reported.

"On June 16th, the South Carolina House of Representatives voted to override the Governor’s veto 31 – State Aid to Public Libraries - 110 to 5, and veto 92 – ARRA Stimulus funds - 77 to 33. The next day, June 17th, the Senate followed suit and overrode veto 31, 41-3. Twelve days later the Senate overrode veto 92, 36-4." They voted to override both vetoes that would have cut South Carolina public library funding.

=== New York Public Library ===
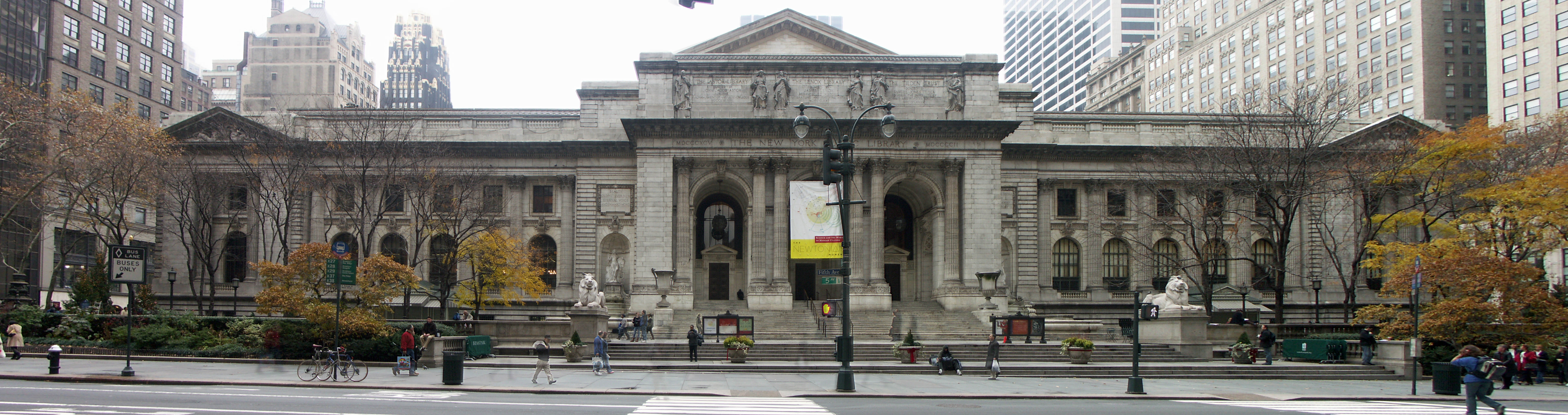
Panoramic view of the New York Public Library (NYPL)

In 2009, the New York Public Library faced city budget cuts of $37 million. The funding cuts would have meant the closure of numerous branch libraries, a reduction of library services hours, and staff layoffs. NYPL has successfully retained $23 million in subsidies and raised $144,000 through an advocacy campaign entitled "Don't Close the Book on Libraries."

NYPL implemented a variety of advocacy efforts to fight the budget cuts. A key aspect of the campaign was a message that online users saw when entering the library's main Web site. The message read, "Keep your library open. We need your help! Record numbers of New Yorkers are relying on The New York Public Library in these difficult economic times." The library asked patrons to make a donation of $5 or more and protest the budget cuts by contacting the city representatives. The library also utilized a variety of other online tools to support the campaign. NYPL asked celebrities to create a YouTube video that encouraged people to participate in advocating for the library. Some of the celebrities included Bette Midler, Amy Tan, Jeff Daniels, and Mike Nichols. Facebook, Twitter and other social networking sites were also used to inform people of the campaign and ask them to contribute in any way possible. The most unusual advocacy effort was a Ghostbusters skit performed in the library by Improv Everywhere, a group that "causes scenes of chaos and joy in public places." The performers created a video of the act which features a link to the NYPL's website.

In addition to library users donating money and contacting local officials, the New York Public Library also received "spontaneous support" for their campaign. This unanticipated and unsolicited support included a NYC photographer who created art in support of NYPL, teenagers who created and distributed buttons for NYPL, and a patent attorney who started a Facebook group, "Save the NYPL" with 600 members, and a store featuring "Save the NYPL" t-shirts, the profits of which were donated to the library.

Although the NYPL reduced its service hours to five days per week, all branches have been retained at this point. This success was realized through the advocacy of "130,000 New Yorkers and others who wrote letters, donated more than $144,000 online, called elected officials, and raised their voices on the steps of City Hall" as well as "children who created artwork and the seniors who passed our flyers." An article by Tom Murphy states that, "The NYPL is a community service and it is right and just that the community can be involved in saving it." .

=== Findlay-Hancock County Public Library ===
In the summer of 2009, the Findlay-Hancock County Public Library in Findlay, Ohio, discovered that state legislators were planning to cut its funding by about $1.2 million over the next two years. Including the loss of funding due to the general economic downturn, Library Director Jeff Winkle expected the total decrease in funding to be around $725,000 per year. The Library Board reacted immediately to the expected budget cuts by reducing library hours, number of staff, staff benefits, and materials. In an attempt to recoup the lost funding, the Library Board decided to request the inclusion of a $500,000 levy on the next ballot, which would garner approximately $700,000 in added revenue per year and allow the library to reinstate the previous library hours and staffing levels. It was uncertain whether the levy – costing the owner of a $100,000 home about $16 per year - would be supported by the community.

In April 2010, a month before the county was to vote on the levy, a plea for library support was printed in the local paper:

For the first time in its 120 years of serving the community, the Findlay-Hancock County Public Library needs our help. We urge voters to support the levy, which is needed to offset recent cuts in state funding. A library, like schools, safety forces, and the hospital, is one of the pillars of a community, and helps define who we are. The community has always supported the library with our business, now we need to support it by giving it a small, but needed, boost in funding. We all will benefit from the investment.

The Citizens for Findlay-Hancock County Public Library raised $8,575 in contributions from the Friends of the Library and local and non-local individuals to campaign for the levy. Campaign publicity included yard signs, banners, radio and newspaper ads, flyers, postcards, bookmarks, and door hangers advocating that locals vote yes on the levy. A website was created to provide information about the levy and allow supporters to download a “Vote YES For Our Library” graphic.

On May 4, 2010, the final verdict on the levy was a firm yes by 64% of voters. “"I'm just so grateful to everyone who supported this levy," library Director Jeff Winkle said after the election results came in. "We're looking forward to getting back to full services.""

=== El Paso County Library ===
When El Paso County, Texas, faced a $20 million shortfall in 2004, the manager of the county library in the small town of Fabens reduced her budget by 31%. Members of the Commissioners' Court saw this decrease as insufficient, voting to close the library in August 2004.

Upon hearing the news, the local library collective, EPAL (El Paso Area Libraries) met to organize a library support rally. They used the ALA (American Library Association) “Save America’s Libraries” toolkit and followed the model rally agenda to plan the event. The rally was held in the Fabens Middle School cafeteria. Over 500 people, representing all ages and backgrounds, attended including the three county commissioners. The rally was covered by nearly all El Paso area media outlets. Citizens spoke out about their support for their library, including 15-year-old Karina Cacho: “We wouldn’t have anywhere to go to do homework or use the Internet” if the library closed.

At the public hearing two weeks later, the commissioners voted to fund the salaries of the staff for one year, with the condition that the library transition into an existing organization and/or create a joint-use model to ensure the maintenance of future library services. EPAL provided $21,000 for materials & supplies for the year and facilitated the change to a new location. The crowd of over 400 people who attended the commissioners meeting, some with homemade signs urging long-term library funding, were boisterous and passionate about the library programs they supported. EPAL then actively researched many options by holding a community meeting with representatives from the County Commissioners, school district heads, and other major contributors in the community. This meeting garnered much support for the library and helped in finding the new home for the library within the Fabens Independent School District.

As of October 2005, the library has a new home at one of the schools in the Fabens Independent School District. The county agreed to provide transition funds for the move. Fabens ISD funds the salary for the librarian. EPAL agreed to help, along with other fundraisers, to provide funds for materials, supplies, and other needs. The new Fabens ISD Community Library opened during National Library Week 2006 (first Monday in April).

=== Phoenix Public Library ===
At the beginning of 2010, the Phoenix Public Libraries were faced with a difficult situation. The city council began proposing budget cuts for public safety organizations, including the Phoenix Fire Department and the Phoenix Police Department. This was the first time the city proposed cuts to these vital organizations. In an attempt to retain the jobs held at the police and fire departments, police union representative, Mark Spencer, suggested in an interview to create more cuts to the libraries stating that police officers should not lose their jobs until every librarian position has been cut. The community wrote in to The Arizona Republic arguing that libraries are in part responsible for creating safer and friendlier communities.

The proposed cuts would ultimately close six of the 15 branches within the city and cut 73.5 positions. In addition, all branches would be closed on Fridays. The overall library budget would be cut 21.4%. This is including the 2.4% that would be considered efficiency savings. The closing of this many branches for a city the size of Phoenix, AZ could severely hurt the quality of services provided. For a population of 1.5 million, the 15 branches were already overcrowded. According to the Phoenix Public Library website, between July 1, 2009, and June 30, 2010, more than 4.7 million people used the library facilities, 14.4 million materials were checked out, and more than 29 million visits were made to the library’s website.

As of February 4, 2010, the city council enacted a 2% food tax that would create an additional $50 million in revenue. One month later, the food tax was passed, and the branches were kept from closing. This is not an entirely happy ending, however, as the library system still faced budget cuts. As an answer to closing entire branches, 27.8 positions would be cut throughout the remainder of the fiscal year as well as concessions in employee benefits and pay. In addition, each branch would cut one day of operation a week.

The efforts of the community to save the library cannot be ignored. Many wrote to newspapers like the one mentioned above. There was also much support for and participation in organizations such as Friends of the Phoenix Public Library, who raised awareness of the budget cuts and the effects they would have on the community. All of these efforts forced the city council to reevaluate the planned budget cuts.

=== San Francisco Public Library ===
In November 2007, the Friends of the San Francisco Public Library were successful in getting voters to pass Proposition D. The passing of Prop D renewed the Library Preservation Fund that “enabled the library to increase operating hours by 53% and expanded the budget for books and materials by almost 400%. In addition, Prop D grants the City the authority to issue revenue bonds and to ensure that the Branch Library Improvement Program can continue to renovate San Francisco’s neighborhood libraries.” In 1988, the advocates “realized their long time goal of a new Main Library by championing Proposition A, a bond issue that would fund $109.5 million to build a new Main Library, which opened its doors on April 18, 1996." In 2000, Friends advocates also "led a $106 million bond measure to build and refurbish 24 neighborhood branch libraries city-wide. As with the Main, public bonds will not pay for equipment or furnishings inside the branches. To meet this need, Friends is charged with raising $16 million through the Neighborhood Library Campaign."

=== Bridgeport Public Library ===
When the city of Bridgeport, Connecticut, looked for ways to address its $10 million budget deficit in 2008, Mayor Bill Finch suggested cutting the Bridgeport Public Library budget by $1.1 million, arguing that “[l]ibraries are not essential services.”

It was not the first time the BPL budget had come under fire. The library was already suffering the effects of a budget eroded throughout the 1990s, with buildings badly in need of repair and dispirited workers shifted from location to location as a stopgap for severe staffing shortages. "The Connecticut Post" reported in 2009 that the library had seen its budget reduced by 16 percent over the past two years. It was Finch’s drastic proposal that ultimately spurred Scott Hughes, the library director, to action.

Hughes fought to take the matter of library funding directly to the public. Citing a long-obscure tax law, he sued the city to allow a library-budget referendum be put directly to voters on the next ballot. In August, 2009, Superior Court Judge David Tobin sided with Hughes, and the referendum was set to go forward the following November.

Prior to the election, Hughes enlisted more than 100 volunteers to rally support for the referendum through phone calls and neighbor education. On November 3, 2009, the referendum – which guaranteed the equivalent of $1 million every year to the library – passed 2683 votes to 1455. It amounted to roughly 44 percent more than the budget in place and brought per capita support from $35 to $50. As a long-term effect, the library system now has a reliable source of income that cannot be changed by City Council vote.

=== Western Australia Public Libraries ===
In 2008–2009, the Western Australia State Government provided additional funding to public libraries but then decreased that amount in 2009–2010 by 40%. Steps were made for the Local Government Association to represent the libraries to the State Government, but this was insufficient. Instead, a grassroots campaign was started; it was supported by the Australian Library and Information Association but led by Public Libraries Western Australia and Western Australian librarians. Postcards and a letter template to send to politicians and bumper stickers were created and shared with the public. The media picked up the story in both print and radio. Although Culture Minister John Day did not approve the full amount that was asked for, the budget that was approved represented a significant increase that could sustain the Western Australian Public Libraries.

== Failures ==
While many libraries benefit from advocacy many more suffer from a lack of advocacy or insufficient support.

=== Lincoln Library ===
In June 2009, faced with a large deficit to the city budget, Mayor Tim Davlin of Springfield, Illinois, began proposing service cuts to the library, police, and firefighters. At this time, the possibility of closing branches or the whole library system was discussed to help make up for a $7 to $9 million deficit. Library patrons quoted in a news article from The State Journal-Register found the idea of closing the library “pretty awful” and “unthinkable”. In this same article Bob Doyle, executive director of The Illinois Library Association, stated that library use across the nation had increased by 20 to 30 percent due to the recession, indicating the increased need for library services. The Lincoln Public Library system consisted of a main library and two branches, the Southeast and the West branches. Between fiscal year 2008 and 2009, the library had seen an increase in all aspects of library services including a 13% increase in the number of programs offered and an 18% increase in program attendance. Mayor Davlin even described the loss of services as a blow to “literacy and a societal goal of providing educational access to our citizens.” But the shortfall was too great and some form of cuts seemed imminent.

In January 2010, Mayor Davlin announced his new budget for fiscal year 2011, which began March 2010, with many cost-saving measures. This included the closure of the Lincoln Libraries branches. Within several weeks of the budget announcement the branches were closed with little resistance from the public or politicians. Because the city leased the building where the Southeast branch was located all books and materials had to be removed by March 1, 2010. In a February 11 press release, the city announced the closing of the branches and the sale of much of the Southeast branch’s collection. While some of the collection was transferred to the main branch much of the collection was put on sale for the public or other organizations. During these closures, several alderman expressed their sadness at losing library services but maintained hope that these closures would be temporary.

In the Lincoln Library Bulletin newsletter for March/April 2010 library director Nancy Huntley recapped the recent library cuts. She stated that the materials from the Southeast branch were sold at a Friends book sale or given to local schools. These materials were able to benefit the community, but dispersing the library collection makes the cuts seem more permanent. Perhaps summing up the situation best she wrote, “It takes a long time to build a library and a very short time to dismantle it; one is done with hope and promise, the other with sadness and regret.”

=== Indianapolis-Marion County Public Library ===
In 2009, the Indianapolis-Marion County Public Library spent $46 million on operations, but the 2011 budget was reduced by approximately $2.5 million. Tom Shevlot, President of the library board, said that this would only be a temporary fix, and the library will have to establish a long-term plan to keep costs down. A few of the cuts include:

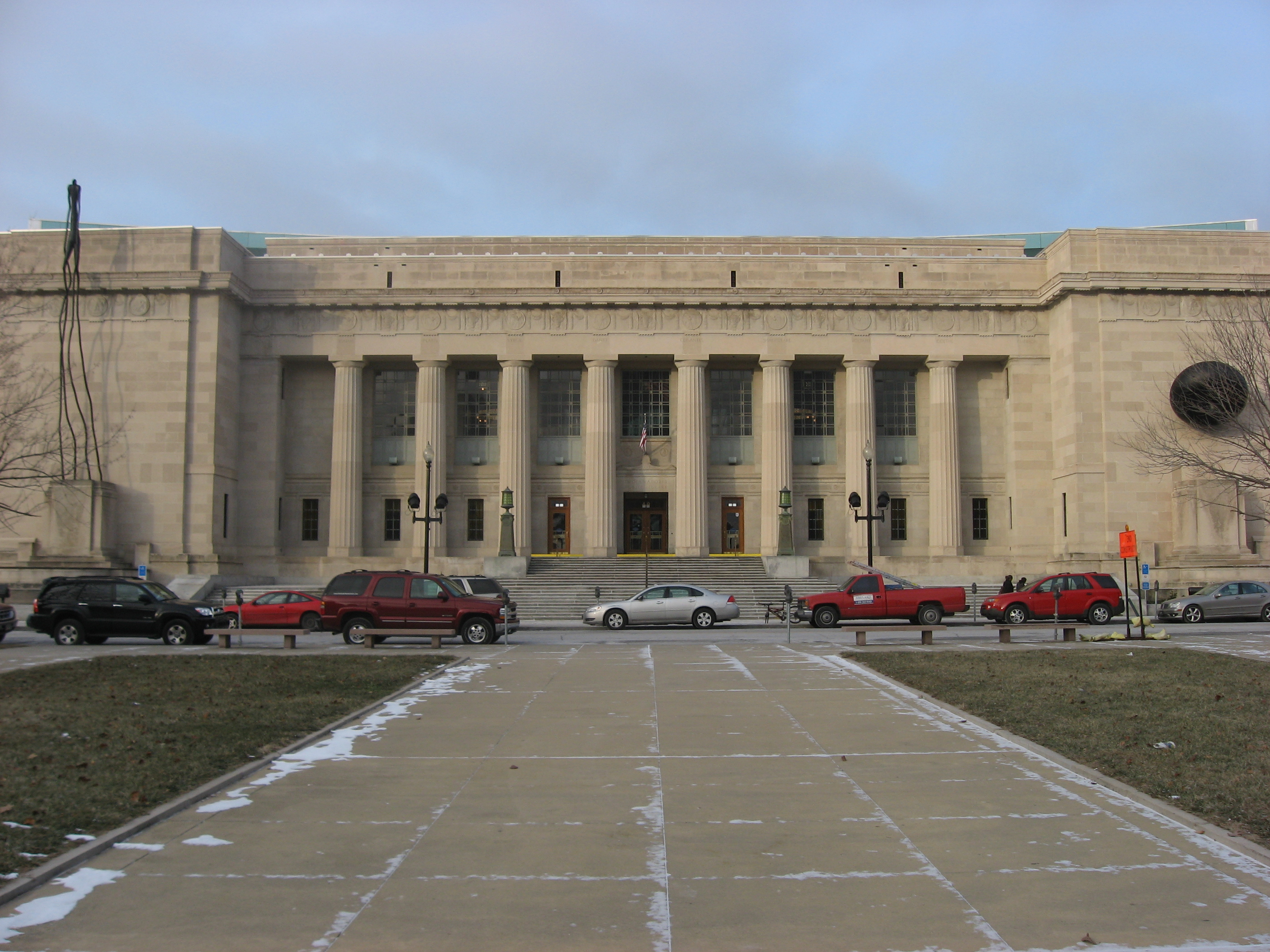
Indianapolis Marion County Public Library (IMCPL) Central Library in downtown Indianapolis, IN

- A 20% cut ($1 million) in the acquisitions budget
- Elimination of more than twenty staff members
- No longer sending out notices to patrons
- Closing branches during the summer
- Fees for borrowing DVDs
- Fees for the replacement of lost library cards

“A little more than 80 percent of library revenue comes from property taxes, which were recently capped by Indiana law.” In April 2010, the library board proposed to close six of the twenty-two branches in order to meet the projected deficit.

After an out-pouring of public support, city officials commissioned the High Performance Government Team to come up with alternatives to closing branches. This team suggested cutting hours in lieu of closing branches. In August 2010, the IMCPL board voted to cut the 26 percent of the system’s hours from 1,324 to 980 at Central Library and the 22 branches. The Central Library is now closed every Thursday with hours reduced on other days throughout the week, beginning October 3, 2010. Branches will be closed either Fridays or Saturdays. Fewer than half of the library branches will have Sunday hours.

=== Siskiyou County Library ===
Siskiyou County, California, administrator Brian McDermott announced in May 2010 that due to a $3.7 million deficit the entire library would be closed down forever by June 30. By closing the main library and its 10 branches, the county would save $716,000. This northern California county with 46,000 residents is roughly the size of Connecticut and is very rural, and though it once boomed thanks to gold and lumber, it now suffers from 17% unemployment. Siskiyou libraries are not unfamiliar with budget cuts; in 2000, there were 20 staff members covering 11 buildings, and by 2010 there were only 12 employees.

Lisa Musgrove, the library director, proposed a plan that would allow for at least four of the libraries to remain open and bring staff counts down to six with a handful of volunteers. This proposal was rejected by the county supervisors but gave Musgrove 6 months to find alternative funding for the library. In the meantime, the library was given $140,000 from emergency funds to keep four branches open with a skeleton crew through December 2010. Volunteers stepped in to keep all of the branches open, although hours were significantly cut short at all locations.

Consultants proposed a new library system that involved 2 to 4 branch locations, a centralized warehouse, book dispensing kiosks, book "drop points," and a reading room. This would cut the library budget to $165,000 per year. The decision for the proposal will not be made until the November 2010 election. However, even if the plan is approved, the county supervisors foresee even more choppy waters for the following year's budget.

=== New Jersey Knowledge Initiative ===
The New Jersey Knowledge Initiative was a statewide library business and technology program which provided entrepreneurs, small business owners and students access to top science and technology journals and key business information which endured a drastic reduction in funding in 2008 under Governor Corzine. This forced cancellation of contracts with medical and scientific databases. Governor Chris Christie's FY 2011 budget proposal slashed statewide library funding by 74%, including the entire appropriation for NJKI databases. The New Jersey State Library has campaigned tirelessly for a restoration of funding, pointing out that the benefits to small businesses, universities and students represent a 13 to 1 return on the dollars invested, and that many beneficiaries cannot afford direct access to these databases at their own expense.

Small businesses, among the greatest beneficiaries of the program, have not advocated for restoration of the funding, opting instead to support Governor Christie’s call for reduced government spending and lower taxes. Had small businesses joined the state library, local public libraries, academic libraries and universities in advocating for restoration of the NJKI, the outcome might have been different.

=== Montgomery County Public Libraries ===
From 2008 to 2010, the Maryland Montgomery County Public Libraries' budget was cut by 30%, from $40 million to $28 million. This led to cuts in hours, staffing, materials, and services.

In July 2010, MCPL implemented new hours at all locations. Though the changes represented an overall cut in hours, they also served to make hours consistent between branches. The budget for library materials also suffered, being reduced by 45%. This translated to some electronic resources being dropped, fewer new reference materials, fewer magazine subscriptions, and reduction in the availability of popular titles.

The library lost 60 staff positions during FY 2010 and expects to lose another 80 in FY 2011. In part because of the reduced staffing, many services are also being reduced or eliminated. MCPL was unable to participate in a statewide summer reading program this year. The cost of the program is usually covered by Friends of the Library Montgomery County, but with reduced staff the library was unable to run the state program. MCPL has also suspended bookmobile service for at least two years, possibly longer depending on what sort of service they decide to implement once the funding is in place.

Despite these setbacks, MCPL soldiers on. Several renovation/construction projects are underway, and over 900 people participated in an online program survey in June. The library communicates with its users in a variety of media, including blogs and topical RSS feeds, monthly director's reports, Twitter, and Facebook.

=== Hood River County Libraries ===
Residents of Hood River County, Oregon, lost local access to a public library in July 2010 when their three libraries closed for lack of funding. Located about 60 miles east of Portland, the library system had been in continuous operation for nearly 100 years. The closure resulted from the failure of Measure 14-37 in the May 2010 election, which would have created a new library tax district. Voters defeated the measure by 54 percent to 46 percent.

An editorial in The Oregonian explained the outcome this way: “… like many other counties, Hood River County is in serious financial trouble. And the library is one place it can cut.” Ironically, the closures came just seven years after voters approved a bond measure to expand the system’s flagship library. Taxpayers will continue to repay that debt until it retires in 2015.

The libraries may not be closed for good. Measure 14-39 in the November 2010 election will provide voters another chance to create a library tax district. If the measure passes, a newly elected library board will decide how and when to reopen the libraries. That could be as late as early 2012.

== See also ==
- Andrew Carnegie
- Book cart drill team
- Education for librarianship
- Guerrilla librarian
- Informatics (academic field)
- International Federation of Library Associations and Institutions
- Librarian
- Library Company of Philadelphia
- Library science
- List of libraries
- List of library associations
- Melvil Dewey
- OCLC
- Philanthropy
- Preservation (library and archival science)
- Public space
