= Friends of Libraries =

Type of charitable group that supports libraries

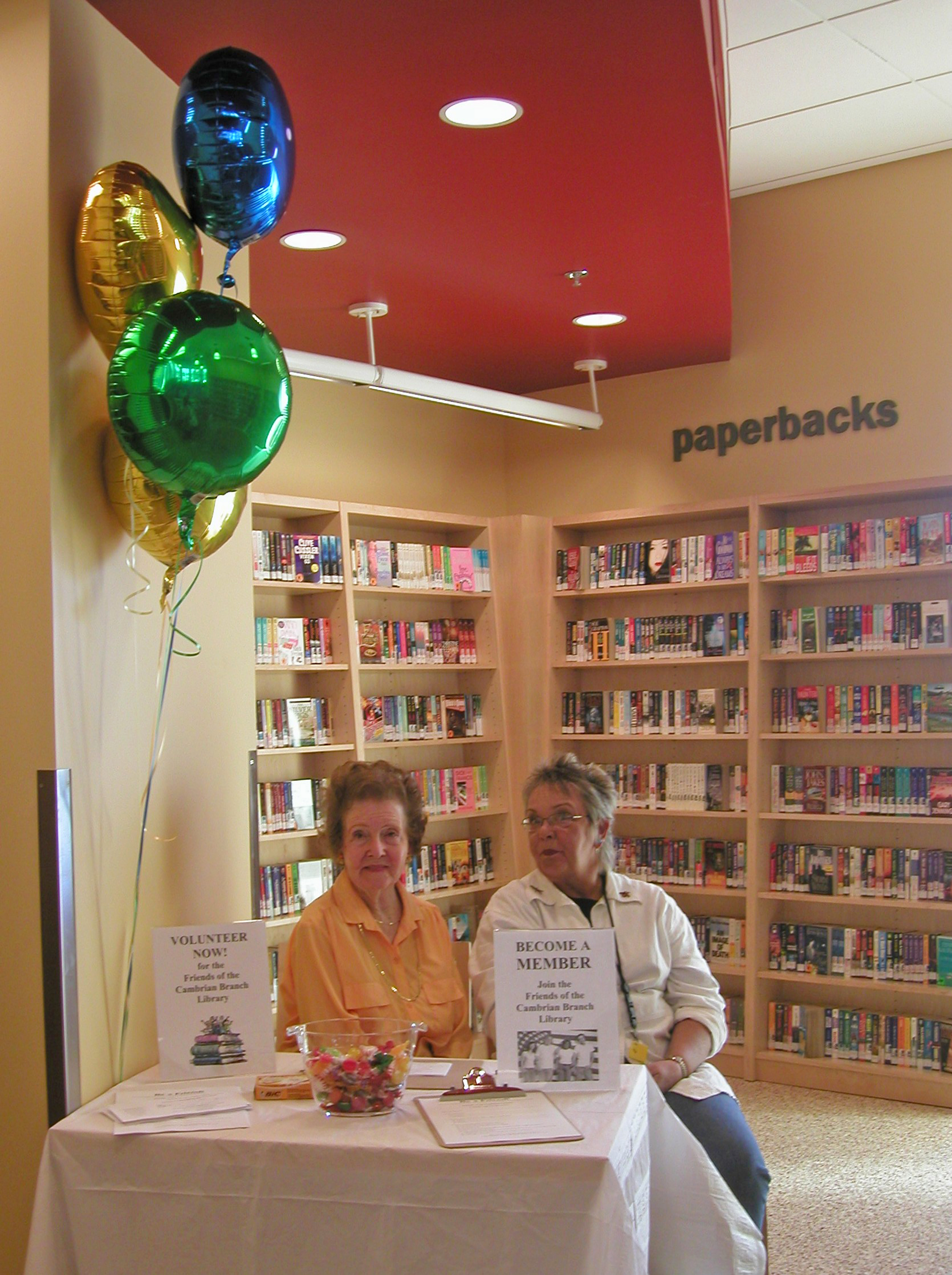
Friends of the Cambrian Library membership drive.

Friends of Libraries (also Friends of the Library and may be shortened to Friends) are non-profit, charitable groups formed to support libraries in their communities. Support from the Friends groups may be financial, political and cultural. Groups are separate from the libraries they support and made up of volunteers. Generally, groups are structured, handle finances and work closely with library management. In the United States, Friends groups also work closely with the American Library Association (ALA). Other countries, such as Australia, France, South Africa and the United Kingdom all have Friends of Libraries groups.

== About ==
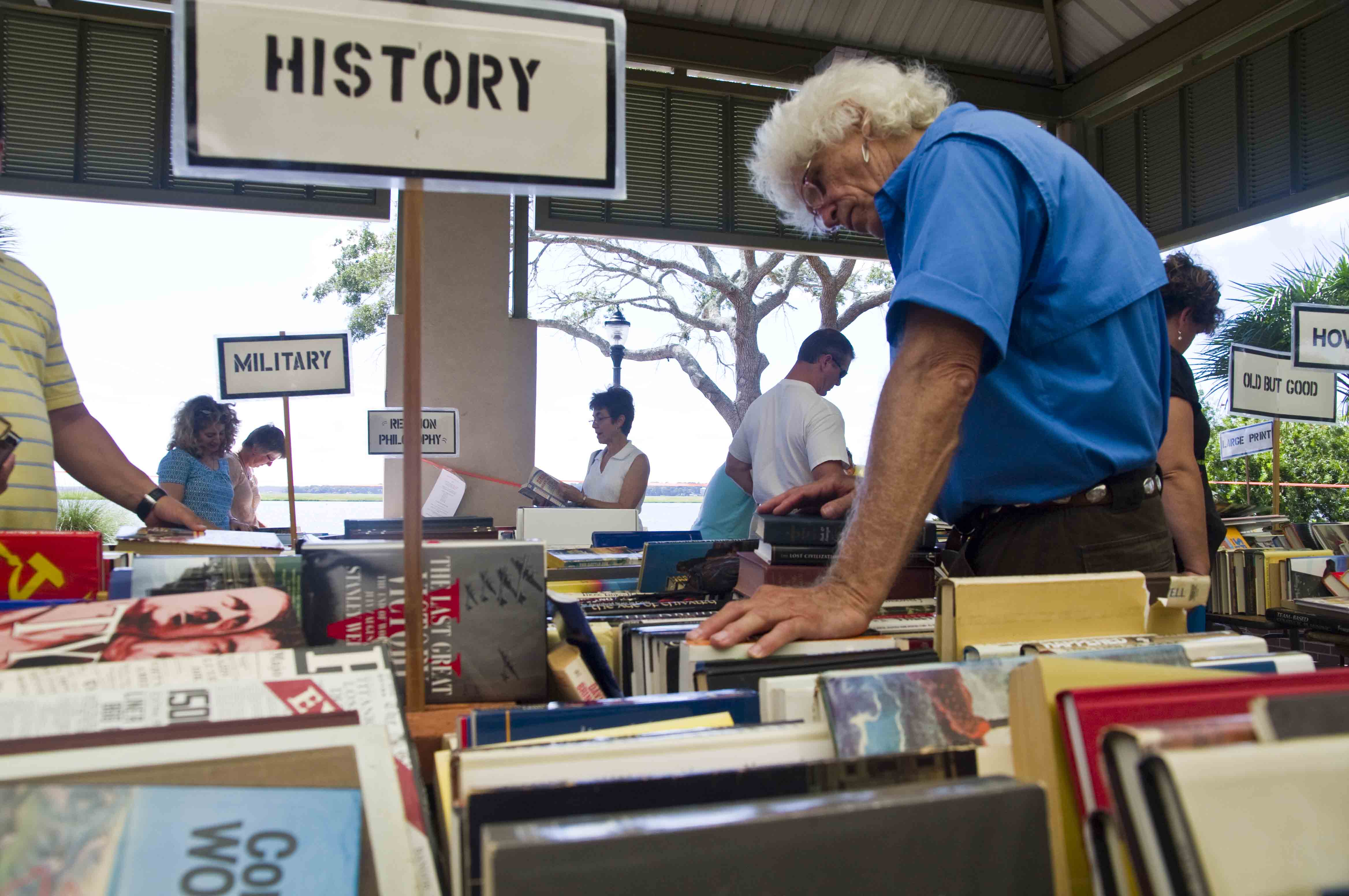
Friends of the Beaufort County Library book sale.

Friends of Libraries are adaptable groups that fit the needs of the communities and the libraries they support. They are made up of volunteers who organize themselves independently to support their local library or libraries. Generally, Friends groups want to have good library service in their communities. Friends of Libraries groups do many different things. Many work towards public support of libraries, including government advocacy and spreading information about library services. Other groups help provide resources and financial support. A 1977-78 survey found that most Friends groups were supporting public libraries. A 1987 study found that only around 24% of academic libraries had Friends support. Friends groups in the United States may be local, but are also organized on the state and national levels.

Friends organizations are often structured and include memberships, meetings and an organizational constitution. Generally, the most successful Friends groups have a strong and "broad charter" from the start of their creation. Friends groups should also create bylaws for the group. Part of a Friends groups' bylaws is the necessity of holding annual meetings where the members of the group can meet, assess their situation and make necessary changes as needed. Generally, in the US, these bylaws also include the group's name, their purpose, and membership rates. All Friends groups also need to determine their charitable status. In the US, Friends groups need to obtain tax-exempt status. Friends of Libraries in the UK can be charities set up to run community libraries. In France, Friends groups are considered public utilities.

They often work with library management or the library board in various capacities. A survey conducted in 1977 and 1978 found that Friends groups that worked with the library's director were often successful groups. In some areas, library directors have requested that Friends of the Library join larger, statewide groups. Librarians, in some cases, are the ones who decide how to spend the funds provided by the Friends. In other cases, the Friends' board decides how to distribute and use the money raised. Library management can also send the Friends a wish-list of items the library needs. In Sedona, Arizona, the public library there was privatized and the Friends of the Library group in Sedona organized to support it and to oversee library administration. Friends groups that support academic libraries also work with the library director, alumni of the school and the school's faculty.

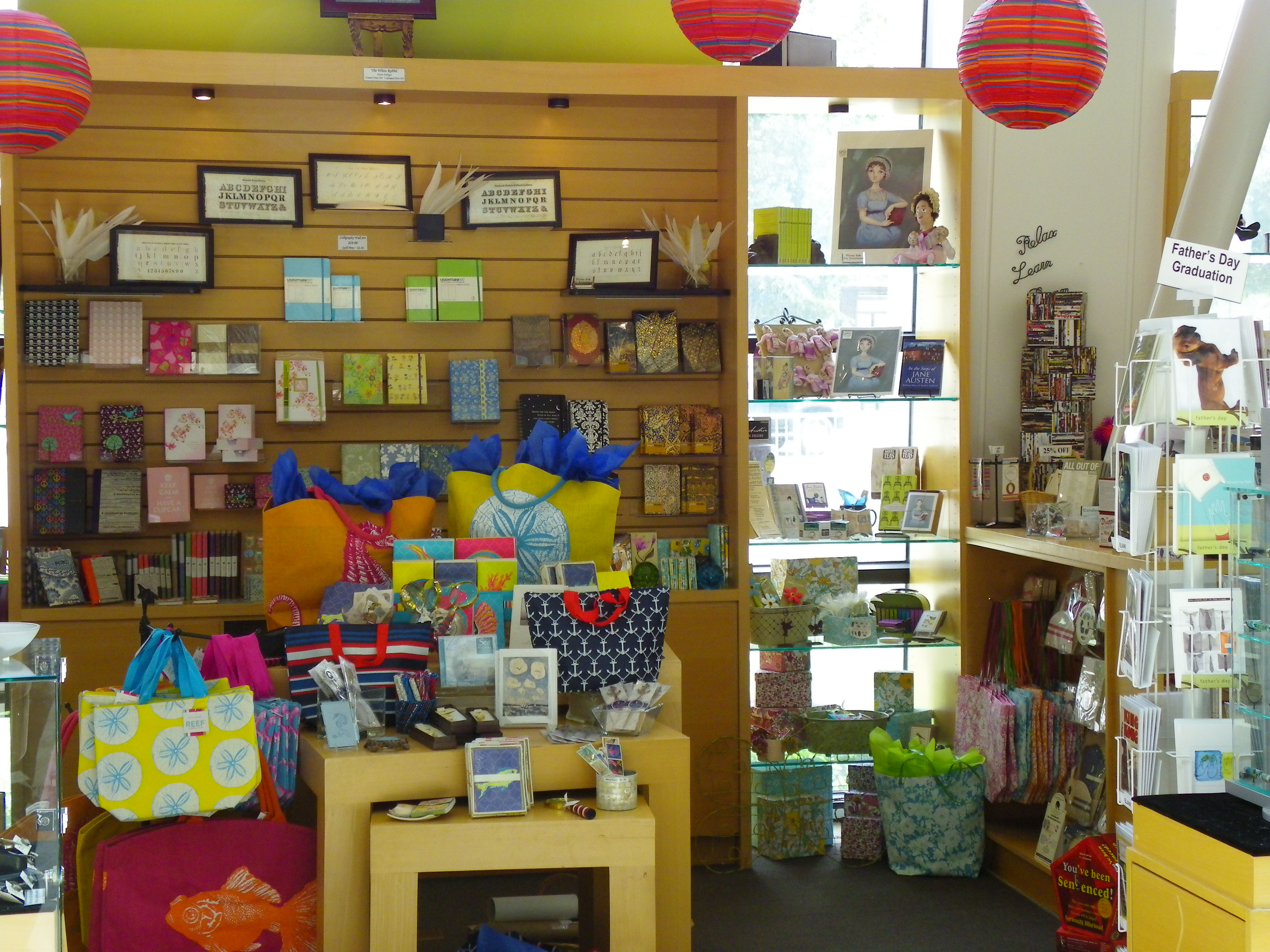
Friends of the Library Shop in Salt Lake City Main Library

Some Friends groups are created primarily for the purpose of raising money for their library. Friends might raise money by selling old and used books. Book sales can be major events for many Friends groups. Friends groups receive books as donations. Membership drives are also another way that Friends groups can raise money. Some Friends groups sell items in their own retail space inside of the libraries they support. In 1987, a study conducted by the Friends of Libraries U.S.A. (FOLUSA) found that Friends groups with an average number of 213 members were able to raise $9,408 in funds that year. These funds were used to buy furniture, equipment, books and programming for the libraries. Friends groups also maintain funds in reserve for the institutions they support. One issue that can be raised when Friends provide funding to libraries and archives is that it may decrease incentives to ensure that the libraries or archives are properly and fully funded in the first place. Other Friends groups exist as a form of advocacy or as community "ambassadors" for the library. Because Friends groups are private citizens, they are often more free to advocate for the needs of the libraries they support. Adding local politicians to the mailing list for the Friends is one passive way to provide advocacy and information awareness for the library. In Oregon in 1982, Friends members were required to register as political activists. Friends in the US often attend Library Legislative Days in their respective states as a way to make their voices heard on library issues. Sometimes Friends groups are set up to campaign against a potential council closures of libraries or reductions in budgets.

Every year, Friends of Libraries groups in the US have their own national week of celebration. It is used to promote and raise awareness of the library's services within the community, and also to promote membership. It also serves as an opportunity for libraries and Boards of Trustees to recognize the Friends for their help and support of the library.

Some Friends groups were created specifically to help build a new library. In Naples, Florida, a Friends of the Library group was formed in 1957 with the purpose of building a new Collier County library. The Friends group in Naples was able to take a donation of land which would be leased to the city and used to build the library. Friends of African Village Libraries (FAVL) is a non-governmental organization that was created to build libraries in remote African villages.

Friends groups also help provide information. United for Libraries USA provides many resources for Friends of Libraries groups, some of which include book club suggestions, factsheets, a listserv to share ideas, free toolkits and contact information for existing State Friends Groups.

In Australia, the Friends of Libraries Australia also has Junior Friends groups. The first one was set up for Murrindindi Library in Victoria in 1991.

== History ==
Discovering the history of Friends groups can be challenging and have gaps in information since many groups did not preserve their own archives.

Friends groups in the United Kingdom (UK) can trace their origins back to the Elizabethan Period. The first group to name itself a "Friends group" was founded in France in 1913, called La Société de Amis de la Bibliothèque Nationale des Grandes Bibliotèques de France. This group was formed by Francis Charmes, Salomon Reinach, Pierre Champion and Henri Béraldi to support the French National Library. In 1927, the group was recognized as a public utility. In 1995, this group merged with Amis de la Bibliothèque de France to create the Association des amis de la Bibliothèque Nationale de France.

The first group that named itself "Friends of the Library" in the United States, was founded in 1922 in Glen Ellyn, Illinois. The first president of the group was Mrs. Al Chase and the organization was established to help purchase books for the library. The first year saw this group raise $365 through membership fees. Also in 1922, another group was founded in Syracuse, New York. The first Friends group for a university in the US was formed at Harvard in 1925. Other academic friends groups were formed by 1930 at Columbia, Yale, Princeton and Johns Hopkins. Friends groups were important in helping library services continue during the Great Depression.

By 1959, there were 400 group in the US. During the 1960s, Friends began to form statewide groups. By 1973, there were around 1,000 Friends groups with over 100,000 members. The American Library Association (ALA) created a committee, the Friends of the Library Committee. In 1979, the Friends of Libraries U.S.A. (FOLUSA) was founded in order to help develop more Friends groups around the country. FOLUSA was affiliated with ALA. By the time of the formation of FOLUSA, there were 2,000 Friends groups and around half a million members of these groups. FOLUSA sponsors the Literary Landmark program, designating sites of literary significance. In 2009, over 60 sites in the U.S. were designated Literary Landmarks. In 1989, FOLUSA started presenting awards to members of the United States Congress who have been in support of libraries and library issues. FOLUSA joined with the Association for Library Trustees and Advocates (ALTA) to form United for Libraries USA in 2009.

The National Library of South Africa has a Friends of Libraries group.

In Australia, the Friends of Libraries Australia (FOWL) was created in the mid-1990s and one of the founding patrons was Michael Kirby.

Friends of African Village Libraries (FAVL) was founded in 2001 by Michael Kevane and Leslie Gray to support building libraries in Western Africa. By 2007, FAVL had helped to build five libraries in Burkina Faso and two in Ghana. By 2014, the number had grown to 14, with libraries also in Tanzania and Uganda. FAVL tends to provide management and supervision of the libraries they build. FAVL not only provides printed books, but also creates their own reading material for the libraries when appropriate.

At Princeton University, the Friends of the Library has historically been involved in many activities that benefit the library it is affiliated with, including fundraising, leadership and raising awareness. The board decides how to dispose of funds accumulated in the process of fundraising and collecting dues. Some of the money can be spent on purchasing materials for the library. Other options are to spend it on library activities, renovations to the building or the furniture in it and adding new or improved technology for the staff or patrons to use. In 2014, the Friends of the Library received $6.5 million in endowed funds and membership contributions. There were different positions on the Friends of the Library board that members could be elected to, including Secretary, Treasurer, Chair of the Friends and Chair of the Nominating Committee. Library staff could serve on the board, but it was not necessary that all staff be members. Friends of the Library board meetings were held regularly.

The Student Friends group at Princeton University had 330 members in 2014, two-thirds of them undergraduates. This junior Friends of the Library group toured libraries and exhibits, such as an exhibit on women in science and medicine, and John Rassweiler's collection of medieval seals and matrices.

== See also ==
- History of public library advocacy
- Public library advocacy
