= Beta Phi Mu Award =

Librarianship prize

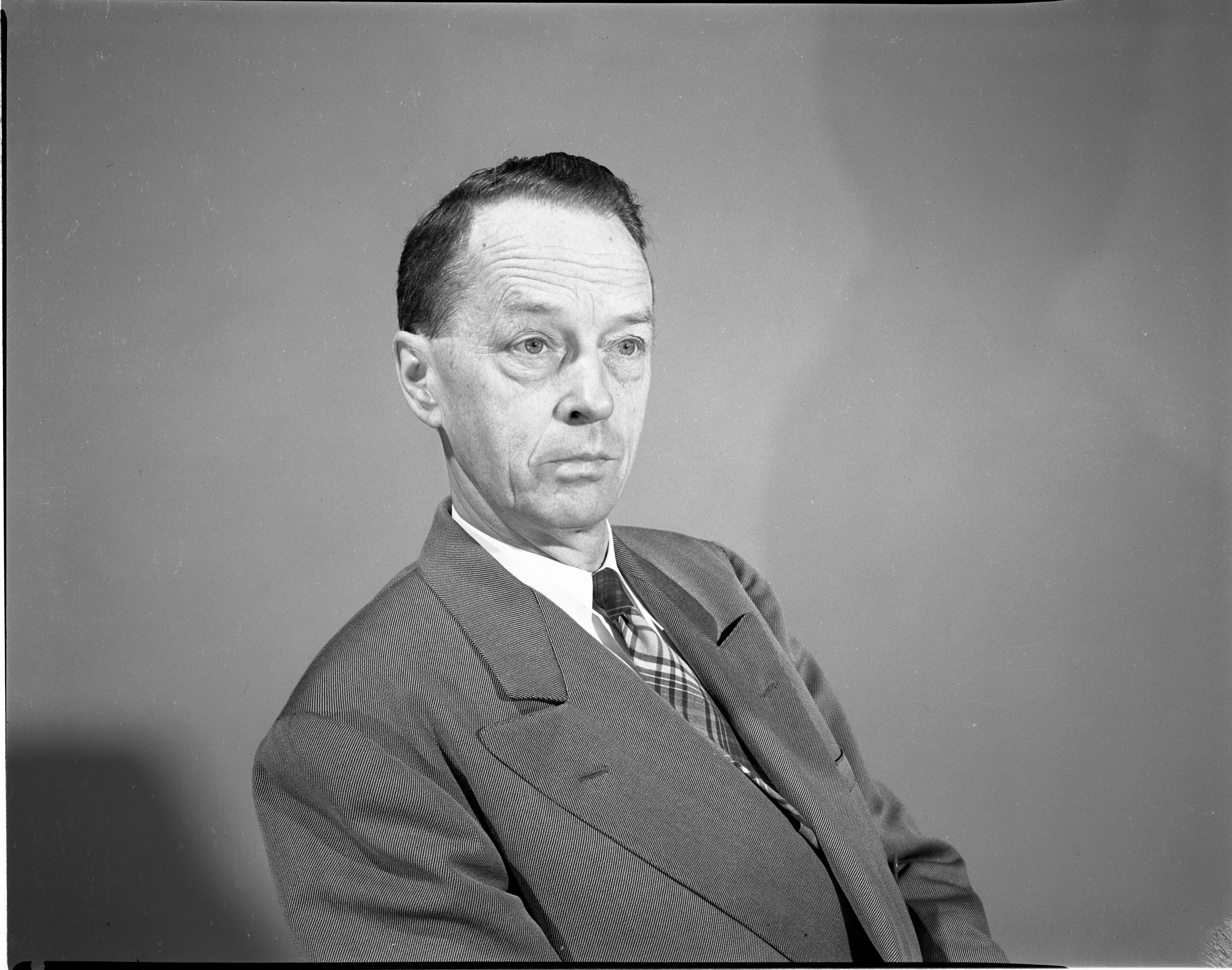
Rudolph Hjalmar Gjelsness, first recipient of the Beta Phi Mu Award in 1954, was dean of the University of Michigan Library Science Department from 1940 to 1964.

The Beta Phi Mu Award is an annual prize recognizing an individual for distinguished service to education for librarianship. First bestowed in 1954, Award recipients include various prominent leaders in the field of librarianship. The Award is sponsored by the international honor society Beta Phi Mu (ΒΦΜ or βφμ), founded in 1948 to promote scholastic achievement among library and information science students.

The printer's mark of Aldus Manutius, the dolphin and anchor seen here on a 1558 title page, serves as the insignia of Beta Phi Mu.

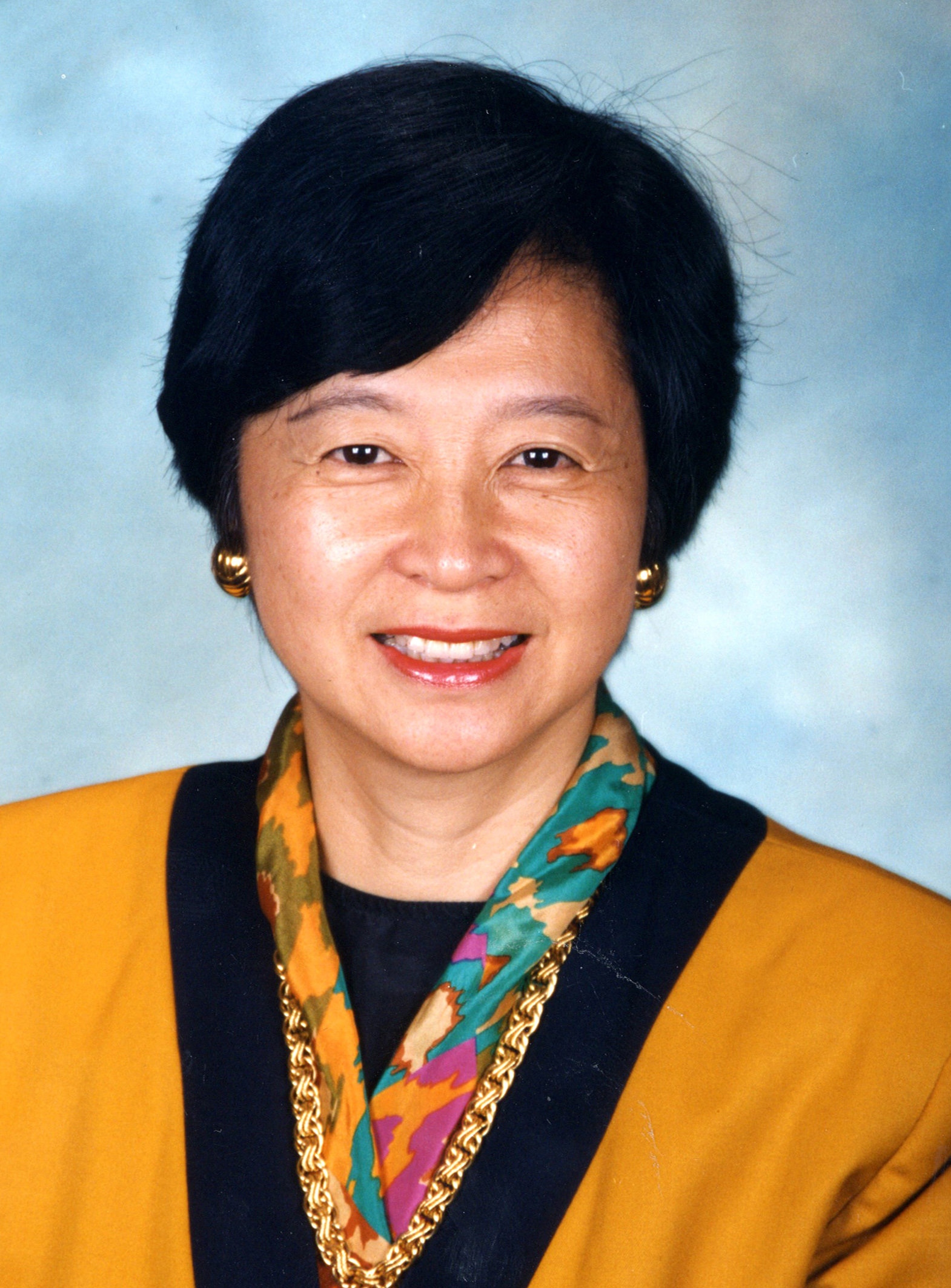
Ching-chih Chen-Beta Phi Mu Award-2008

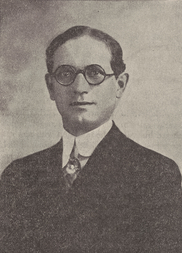
Charles C. Williamson- Beta Phi Mu Award- 1964

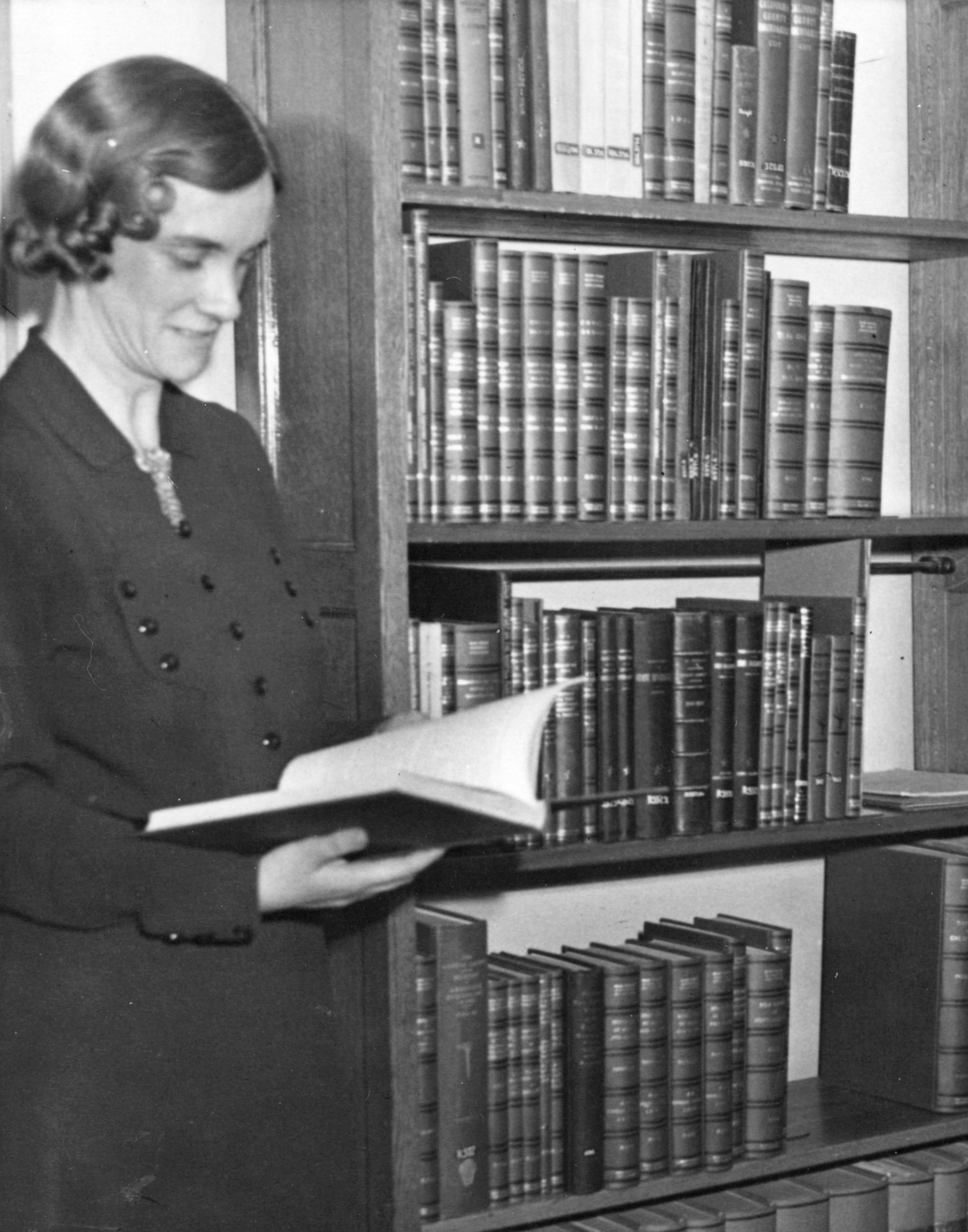
Gretchen Knief Schenk - Beta Phi Mu Award-1955

| Beta Phi Mu Award | Date | University |
|---|---|---|
| Laura Saunders | 2026 | Simmons University School of Library and Information Science |
| Natalie Taylor | 2025 | University of South Florida School of Information |
| Danielle Maurici-Pollock | 2024 | Simmons University, School of Library and Information Science |
| Emily Knox | 2023 | University of Illinois School of Information Sciences, University of Illinois Urbana-Champaign |
| No Award | 2022 | |
| Marcia Rapchak | 2021 | University of Pittsburgh School of Computing and Information |
| John M. Budd | 2020 | School of Information Science and Learning Technologies, University of Missouri |
| Mirah J. Dow | 2019. | School of Library and Information Management, Emporia State University. |
| Clara Chu | 2018 | Mortenson Center for International Library Programs, University of Illinois at Urbana-Champaign |
| Em Claire Knowles | 2017 | School of Library and Information Science, Simmons College |
| Annabel K. Stephens | 2016 | School of Library and Information Science, University of Southern Mississippi |
| Beverly P. Lynch | 2015 | Department of Information Studies, University of California, Los Angeles |
| Beth M. Paskoff | 2014 | School of Library and Information Science, Louisiana State University |
| Elizabeth Aversa | 2013 | School of Library and Information Studies, University of Alabama |
| Mary Wagner | 2012 | Library and Information Science, St. Catherine University (St. Paul, MN) |
| Leslie S.J. Farmer | 2011 | California State University Long Beach |
| Ken Haycock | 2010 | San Jose State University |
| C. James Schmidt | 2009 | San Jose State University |
| Ching-chih Chen | 2008 | Simmons College, Boston |
| Barbara Immroth | 2007 | University of Texas at Austin School of Information |
| Lois Mai Chan | 2006 | University of Kentucky, School of Library and Information Science |
| Lynn Akin | 2005 | School of Library and Information Studies.Texas Woman's University |
| Linda C. Smith | 2004 | University of Illinois School of Information Sciences |
| Kathleen de la Peña McCook | 2003 | School of Library and Information Science, University of South Florida |
| Leigh S. Estabrook | 2002 | University of Illinois School of Information Sciences |
| Lotsee Patterson | 2001 | University of Oklahoma |
| Shirley Fitzgibbons | 2000 | Indiana University |
| Donald William Krummel | 1999 | University of Illinois School of Information Sciences |
| Elizabeth W. Stone | 1998 | Department of Library and Information Science Catholic University |
| Charles Bunge | 1997 | University of Wisconsin-Madison |
| Robert N. Broadus | 1996 | Northern Illinois University |
| Elizabeth Futas | 1995. | University of Rhode Island |
| Jane B. Robbins | 1994 | University of Wisconsin-Madison |
| Kathryn Luther Henderson | 1993 | University of Illinois School of Information Sciences |
| Guy Garrison | 1992 | Drexel University |
| Edward G. Holley | 1991 | University of North Carolina Chapel Hill |
| Robert D. Stueart | 1990 | Simmons College, Boston |
| Charles D. Patterson | 1989 | Louisiana State University |
| Samuel Rothstein | 1988 | University of British Columbia |
| Sarah K. Vann | 1987 | University of Hawaii |
| Agnes Lytton Reagan | 1986 | American Library Association Accreditation Officer |
| Robert M. Hayes | 1985 | University of California Los Angeles |
| Jane Anne Hannigan | 1984 | Columbia University, Rutgers University |
| J. Periam Danton | 1983 | University of California, Berkeley |
| David K. Berninghausen | 1982 | University of Minnesota |
| Haynes McMullen | 1981 | University of North Carolina at Chapel Hill |
| Virginia Lacy Jones | 1980 | Atlanta University |
| Conrad Rawski | 1979 | Case Western Reserve University |
| Frances E. Henne | 1978 | Columbia University |
| Russell E. Bidlack | 1977 | University of Michigan |
| Carolyn Whitenack | 1976 | Purdue University |
| Kenneth R. Shaffer | 1975 | Simmons College |
| Martha Boaz | 1974 | University of Southern California |
| Lester Asheim | 1973 | University of Chicago Graduate Library School |
| Margaret E. Monroe | 1972 | University of Wisconsin-Madison |
| Leon Carnovsky | 1971 | University of Chicago Graduate Library School |
| Raynard C. Swank | 1970 | University of California Berkeley |
| Ethel M. Fair | 1969 | Douglass College Library School- Rutgers |
| Sarah R. Reed | 1968 | School of Library Science, Emporia State University |
| Louis Shores | 1967 | Florida State University |
| James J. Kortendick | 1966 | Department of Library and Information Science. Catholic University of America |
| Jesse H. Shera | 1965 | University of Chicago Graduate Library School, Case Western Reserve University |
| Charles C. Williamson | 1964 | Columbia University |
| Ernest J. Reece | 1963 | Columbia University |
| Florrinell F. Morton | 1962 | Louisiana State University |
| Robert L. Gitler | 1961 | Columbia University |
| Louis Round Wilson | 1960 | University of Chicago Graduate Library School, University of North Carolina |
| Anita Miller Hostetter | 1959 | Chief, Office of Education for Librarianship and secretary, Board of Education, American Library Association |
| Florence Van Hoesen | 1958 | Syracuse University |
| Lucy M. Crissey | 1957 | Columbia University. Contributor to education for librarianship section of The Public Library Inquiry. |
| Margaret I Rufsvold | 1956 | Indiana University. |
| Gretchen Knief Schenk | 1955 | Defender of Grapes of Wrath, advocate of library desegregation. |
| Rudolph Hjalmar Gjelsness | 1954 | University of Michigan |
