= David K. Berninghausen =

American librarian and academic (1916–2001)

- Born: David Knipe Berninghausen; 5 February 1916; Beaman, Iowa, U.S.
- Died: April 12, 2001 (aged 85); Peoria, Arizona, U.S.
- Education: Iowa State Teachers College (B.A., 1936); Columbia University (B.L.S., 1941); Drake University (M.A., 1943); additional studies at University of North Carolina (1944), Harvard University (1950–51)
- Occupation: Librarian · Educator · Author
- Years active: c. 1936–1981
- Employer(s): University of Minnesota; Birmingham‑Southern College; Cooper Union
- Known for: Leadership in library science education and advocacy for intellectual freedom
- Notable work: The Flight from Reason: Essays on Intellectual Freedom in the Academy, the Press, and the Library (1975)
- Title: Director, School of Library Science, University of Minnesota (1953–1974)
- Spouse(s): Elizabeth S. Smith (m. 1940; deceased); Frances Strong Berdie (second wife)
- Children: Two
- Awards: Drake University Alumni Distinguished Service Award (1964); University of Northern Iowa Alumni Achievement Award (1966); Beta Phi Mu Award (1982)

David K. Berninghausen (February 5, 1916 – April 12, 2001) was an American librarian, educator, and writer known for his work in library science education and his advocacy for intellectual freedom. He was the director of the University of Minnesota's School of Library Science from 1953 to 1974 and a professor there until his retirement in 1981.

== Early life and education ==
Berninghausen was born in Beaman, Iowa, to Frederick W. and Lillian (Knipe) Berninghausen. He received a B.A. from Iowa State Teachers College in 1936, followed by a Bachelor of Library Science from Columbia University in 1941. He earned a master's degree from Drake University in 1943 and pursued additional studies at the University of North Carolina in 1944 and Harvard University from 1950 to 1951.

== Career ==
Berninghausen taught English in Iowa high schools before becoming director of libraries at Birmingham–Southern College in 1944. In 1947 he was appointed head librarian at Cooper Union, and in 1953 he joined the University of Minnesota as an associate professor and director of the School of Library Science. He was promoted to full professor in 1955 and remained in that role until his retirement in 1981. He also held a visiting professorship at National Taiwan University from 1962 to 1963

== Professional involvement ==
Berninghausen was chair of the American Library Association (ALA) Intellectual Freedom Committee in two separate terms (1948–1952 and 1967–1972).

He was president of the Association of American Library Schools (1959–1960), president of the American Association of University Professors (1961–1962), and president of the Minnesota Library Association (1957–1958). He also served on the boards of the New York Civil Liberties Union (1951–1953) and the Minnesota Civil Liberties Union (1954–1961).

== Intellectual freedom and publications ==
From the late 1940s through the 1970s, Berninghausen wrote and spoke about intellectual freedom in libraries and higher education. His book, The Flight from Reason: Essays on Intellectual Freedom in the Academy, the Press, and the Library (1975), was published by the American Library Association, and received both praise and criticism.

In the 1970s, Berninghausen published a series of articles in Library Journal that initiated what became known as the "Berninghausen Debate." The debate concerned whether the ALA should take official positions on social and political issues outside librarianship.

== Awards ==
Berninghausen received several awards for his contributions to librarianship. These included:

- Alumni Distinguished Service Award from Drake University (1964)
- Alumni Achievement Award from the University of Northern Iowa (1966)
- Beta Phi Mu Award from the American Library Association (1982)

== Personal life ==
Berninghausen married Elizabeth S. Smith in 1940, and they had two children. After Elizabeth died he married Frances Strong Berdie. He died on April 12, 2001, at the age of 84.

== Selected works ==
- Berninghausen, David K. (May 1948). "Book-Banning and Witch-Hunts". ALA Bulletin. 42 (5): 204–207.
- Berninghausen, David K. (July 1952). "The Right to Read". The Nation. Vol. 175. p. 30.
- Berninghausen, David K. (June 1953). "The History of the ALA Intellectual Freedom Committee". Wilson Library Bulletin. 27 (10): 813–817.
- Berninghausen, David K. (October 1967). "Teaching a Commitment to Intellectual Freedom". Library Journal. 92: 3601–3605.
- Berninghausen, David K. (January 1971). "Defending the Defenders of Intellectual Freedom". American Libraries. 2 (1): 18–21.
- Berninghausen, David K. (November 15, 1972). "Antithesis in Librarianship: Social Responsibility vs. The Library Bill of Rights". Library Journal. 97: 3675–3681.
- Berninghausen, David K. (1975). The Flight from Reason: Essays on Intellectual Freedom in the Academy, the Press, and the Library. Chicago: American Library Association. ISBN 0-8389-0192-1.

== Legacy ==
In a 2002 article on intellectual freedom, Elliott Kanner cited Berninghausen’s views favorably, quoting his assertion that a professional librarian’s first commitment should be to intellectual freedom. Berninghausen's position on professional neutrality was criticized by librarians who argued that the profession had broader social responsibilities.

Berninghausen's personal and professional papers are archived in the University Archives at the University of Minnesota.

== See also ==
- Library science
- American Library Association
- Intellectual freedom
- Library Bill of Rights
