= Clara Chu =

Chinese-Canadian library and information science scholar

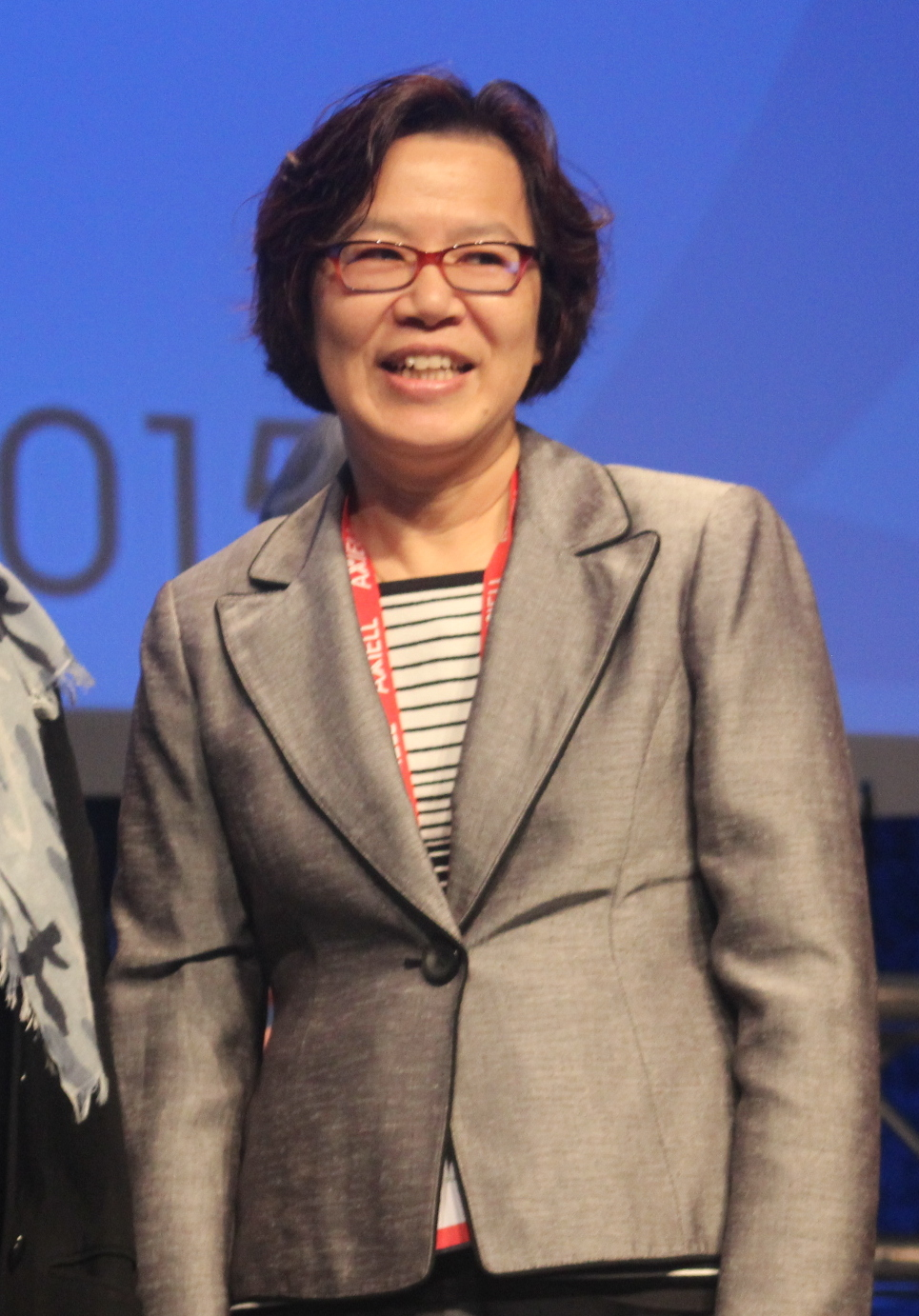
- Occupation: Director of the Mortenson Center for International Library Programs
- Title: Mortenson Distinguished Professor
- Awards: ALA Equality Award; Beta Phi Mu Award

Academic background
- Education: University of British Columbia; University of Western Ontario

Academic work
- Discipline: Library and information science
- Sub-discipline: Multiculturalism
- Institutions: University of Illinois at Urbana-Champaign

Clara Chu is a Chinese-Canadian library and information science scholar. She is the Director of the Mortenson Center for International Library Programs at the University of Illinois at Urbana-Champaign. Her research interest is in multicultural library and information services.

== Early life and education ==
Chu was born in Chiclayo, Peru, to Cantonese parents. Her family immigrated to Vancouver, Canada, when she was 10 years old. Chu completed her undergraduate education from the University of British Columbia, majoring in Spanish literature. She graduated from the University of Western Ontario with master's and doctoral degrees in library and information science.

== Career ==
Chu previously held positions at the University of North Carolina-Greensboro and University of California at Los Angeles. She is a former president of the Association for Library and Information Science Education (ALISE).

She was appointed the Director of the Mortenson Center for International Library Programs, and Mortenson Distinguished Professor at the University of Illinois at Urbana-Champaign in 2015.

Chu is one of the leading scholars on multiculturalism and information practices. She co-wrote a work exploring the value of internship as a form of experiential learning in library and information science education.

== Awards and honors ==
She was honored with the American Library Association Equality Award in 2002, and with the Association's Beta Phi Mu Award in 2018.
