= Not Censorship, But Selection =

September 1953 article by Lester Asheim in the Wilson Library Bulletin

"Not Censorship But Selection" is a 1953 article written by Lester Asheim. It was initially published in the Wilson Library Bulletin, and has been influential in library professional standards relating to censorship and collection development. The full text of the article currently resides on the website of the American Library Association.

== Overview ==
This seminal 1953 article on the difference between censorship and selection in libraries influenced later thought and formed the cornerstone of many intellectual freedom documents.

== Summary ==
In the first section of the article Asheim goes over the difference of censorship of a book by the law or by a town, versus the choice of a librarian not to select something for her library. He states that the librarian is not censoring because they are making a choice that only affects her specific institution, whereas the choice the censors are making affect an entire town or nation. The librarian is not saying that the book cannot be circulated, only that she is not going to circulate it. Patrons are still able to get it elsewhere.

Asheim then brings up the question of limited control. He wonders if limited control, which the librarian has when choosing not to select a book, is any different from the limited control of the local pressure group. He then concludes that it is different because the reasons and motives behind the choice are different. He also believes that the patron who is being denied the book is affected differently depending on the intent of the person who is choosing to limit the book. Asheim makes the analogy of the difference between someone’s leg being amputated by a doctor who is doing it because it is necessary, versus a leg being amputated by someone who is psychotic and is doing it because of a sick compulsion. The man who has had his leg amputated by the psychotic knows the difference and is affected differently than if a doctor had done it out of a need to help his patient.

Because it is a physical impossibility to make all books equally accessible, selection by librarians is necessary. Asheim writes that some of the standards that librarians use for selecting books are the same standards that censors use to ban books. For example, it is valid to use the intent of the author as a selection standard, however it can also be used to ban a book in which it is decided that the author's intent is pornographic or treasonable. The standards are subjective. Therefore, the difference between selection and censorship is found in the way the standards are applied.

Asheim argues that the main difference between a selector and a censor is in their approach: the selector's is positive, the censor's is negative. The selector, seeking to preserve, looks to find reasons to keep a book. The censor, seeking to ban, looks for reasons to reject a book. Asheim says that the negative approach makes it inevitable that a book will be judged not in its wholeness but by isolated parts. He writes that the selector's positive approach is demonstrated by the diversity of a library's collection that makes as much as possible accessible to patrons. Further, he believes that the frequency of challenges to library holdings is in itself a testament to the difference between selection and censorship.

He writes that the censor uses external criteria to judge a book; for instance, the author's life may be examined and used as a way to reject a work. The selector, on the other hand, uses internal values and judges a book by its own merit. He calls selection democratic and censorship authoritarian. Finally, Asheim reminds that the confidence the public has in librarians is an earned confidence that can only be kept by staying true to the profession's ideals. And one of these ideals is maintaining the essential difference between selection and censorship.

== Influence ==
Asheim's article has influenced many in the library profession and authors continue to cite it when responding to the changing censorship landscape. In 2002, Tony Doyle drew upon Asheim's article to talk about censorship in the aftermath of the September 11 attacks and June Pinnell-Stephens argued that Asheim's censorship/selection distinction is useful for understanding collection development and censorship in the digital age. It has been argued that the dichotomy of "censorship" and "selection" has the effect of othering the censor. In 2010, Rickey Best cited Asheim in an article portraying academic libraries as bastions of intellectual freedom for maintaining access to materials that were frequently challenged in public libraries.

== Reappraisal ==
In 1983, Asheim wrote a reappraisal of his own article to address the changing tactics of censors and to challenge the persistent assumption that librarians select materials based primarily on their personal tastes. Asheim characterizes groups such as the Moral Majority as having recently (at the time of his writing) switched from attempting to have objectionable books removed to attempting to have books they approved of included to such an extent that the library's collection would be skewed to their perspective. In response, Asheim further emphasizes that segments of the library's patron base should not be allowed to impede each other's rights, and that the job of the librarian is to make selection choices with the library's entire community in mind. He also upholds his prior assertion that the best response to the problem of access is to add ideas rather than to remove them.

== See also ==
- Book Censorship
- American Library Association
