= Norman Horrocks =

Canadian librarian and professor

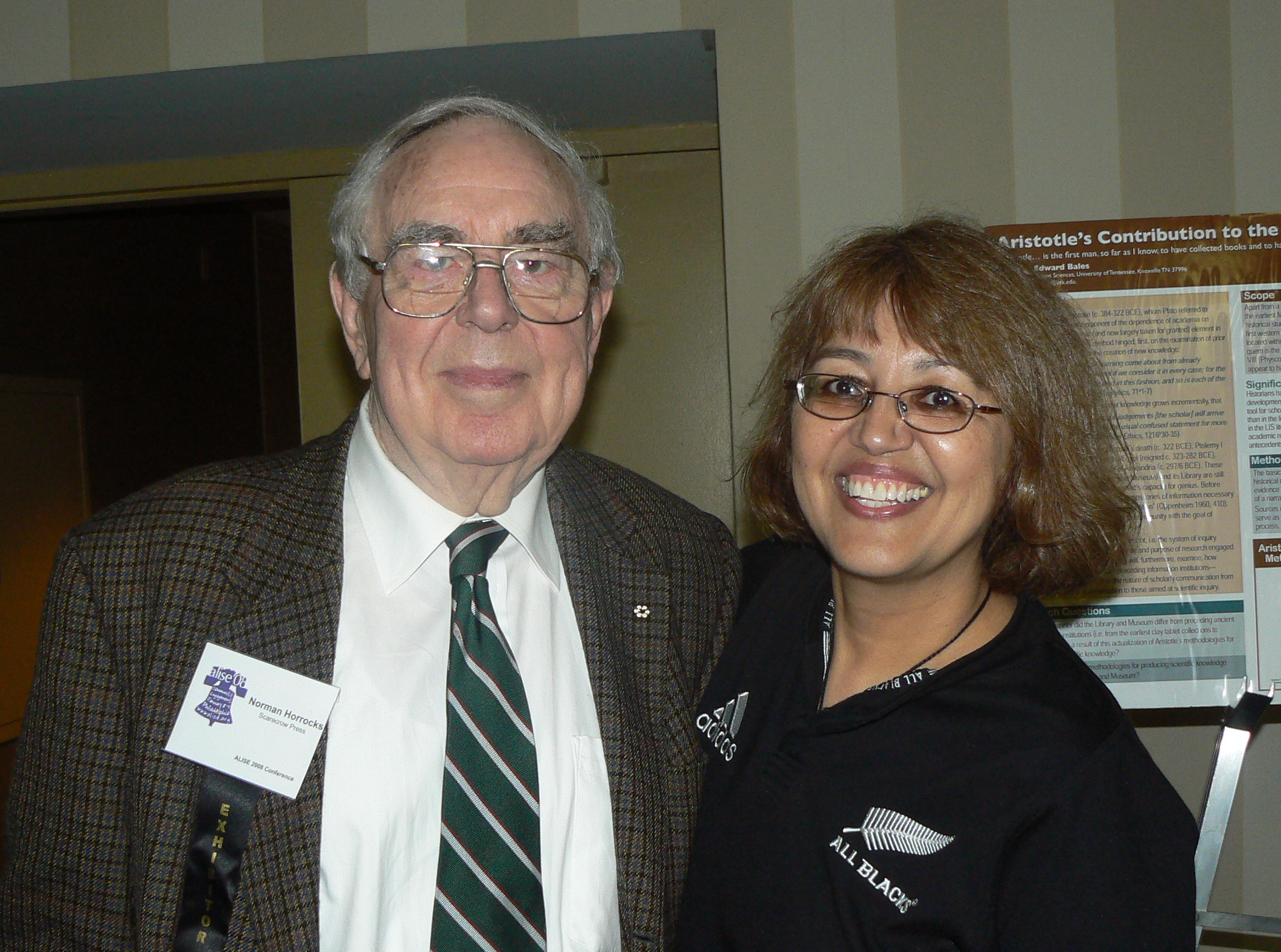
Norman Horrocks with Loriene Roy

Norman Horrocks OC (October 18, 1927 – October 14, 2010) was professor at the School of Information Management at Dalhousie University in Nova Scotia, Canada.

== Biography ==
Horrocks began his library career in Manchester, England, from 1945-53 interrupted by three years in the British Army's Intelligence Corps between 1945 and 1948. He was elected a Fellow of the Library Association, and worked in Cyprus and Perth (where he obtained a bachelor's degree in constitutional history), and then studied for his MLS and doctorate at the University of Pittsburgh before joining Dalhousie in 1971. He became Director of the School of Library and Information Studies (now the School of Information Management) and later was also Dean of the Faculty of Management.

He was elected president of the Association for Library and Information Science Education for 1985-1986. He left in 1986 to become Editorial Vice President of Scarecrow Press, a leading reference book publisher in Metuchen, NJ, until he returned to Dalhousie in 1995.

Horrocks was honored with the Joseph W. Lippincott Award by the American Library Association in 1995.

In 2004 DHorrocks was awarded the International Kaula Gold Medal, having earlier become the only person to have been elected to Honorary Membership in the three national library Associations—Canadian, British and American. Other awards were American Library Association Honorary Membership, the Association for Library and Information Science Education Award for Professional Contribution to Library and Information Science Education, the Atlantic Provinces Library Association, Beta Phi Mu (the international honour society for library and information studies), Dalhousie University School of Information Management Associated Alumni, the New Jersey Library Association, the Nova Scotia Library Association and both Pittsburgh and Rutgers Universities. In 2003 the Nova Scotia Library Association established an annual Norman Horrocks Award for excellence in Library Leadership.

Horrocks was a Fellow of the Chartered Institute of Library and Information Professionals of the UK and an Associate of the Library Association of Australia.

He was appointed an Officer of the Order of Canada in 2006. This award recognizes "a lifetime of achievement and merit of a high degree."

Horrocks died in Halifax, Nova Scotia on October 14, 2010, aged 82."
