= Martha Boaz =

American librarian

Martha Boaz (27 October 1911– 24 July 1995) was an American librarian and dean of the dean of the University of Southern California School of Library Science from 1955 to 1978.

== Career ==
Boaz earned a B.S. in Library Science in 1937 from George Peabody College.

She was assistant librarian at Carrier Library, then known as Madison Memorial Library, from 1940 to 1949. The library was at James Madison University, then known as Madison College.

She received her master's degree in library science in 1950 and her PhD in library science in 1955, both from the University of Michigan. She was the first woman and the third person to earn a PhD in library science from the University of Michigan.

Boaz was the dean of the University of Southern California School of Library Science from 1955 to 1978, its longest-serving dean as of 2005, and some of her records are held at the University Archives of the University of Southern California.

She was president of the Association for Library and Information Science Education from 1961-62

She was president of the California Library Association from 1962 to 1963.She was chair of its Research Committee from 1958 to 1960, chair of its Intellectual Freedom Committee from 1964 to 1966.president of its Library Education Division from 1968 to 1969, on its board of directors in 1972, and as chair of the Council of Deans from 1977 to 1978.

== Selected Publications ==
- Boaz, Martha, ed. (1959). Modern Trends in Documentation: Proceedings of a Symposium Held at the University of Southern California, April 1958. London: Pergamon Press.
- Boaz, Martha, ed. (1973). Toward the Improvement of Library Education. Littleton, CO: Libraries Unlimited. ISBN 0872870758.
- Boaz, Martha, ed. (1979). Current Concepts in Library Management. Littleton, CO: Libraries Unlimited. ISBN 0872872041.
- Boaz, Martha, ed. (1981). Strategies for Meeting the Information Needs of Society in the Year 2000. Littleton, CO: Libraries Unlimited. ISBN 0872872491.
- Boaz, Martha (1987). Librarian/Library Educator: An Autobiography and Planning for the Future. Metuchen, NJ: Scarecrow Press. ISBN 0810819880.
- Boaz, Martha (1991). "The Library and Information Science Profession: Anticipation of Future Important Changes Local, National, International". In Woolls, Blanche (ed.). Continuing Professional Education: An IFLA Guidebook. IFLA Publications. Vol. 55. Munich: K. G. Saur. pp. 89–92. doi:10.1515/9783111357294.89. ISBN 3-598-21784-6.

== Honors ==
- Beta Phi Mu Award in 1974 from the American Library Association.
- The reference room of James Madison University's Carrier Library is named in her honor.
- Inducted into the California Library Hall of Fame in 2023.
