= Scott Nicholson (academic) =

- Born: March 27, 1971 (age 55)
- Awards: Best Non-Digital Game

Academic work
- Discipline: Game Design & Development
- Sub-discipline: Games for Change
- Institutions: Wilfrid Laurier University
- Website: http://scottnicholson.com/

Scott Nicholson (born March 27, 1971) is a Canadian-American Professor of Game Design & Development at Wilfrid Laurier University in Brantford, Ontario. He is an author, game designer, speaker and the Director of the Brantford Games Network Lab at Wilfrid Laurier University in Brantford, Ontario, Canada.

== Academic career ==
Nicholson was the director of the Masters of the Library and Information Science program at Syracuse University’s School of Information Studies from 2001 to 2015. He was also the Director of the Because Play Matters game lab and the Game Designers’ Guild of Syracuse. While at Syracuse, Nicholson won an award for his paper “Inviting the World into the Online Classroom: Teaching a Gaming in Libraries Course via YouTube” at the 2010 Association for Library and Information Science Education (ALISE) Conference.

Nicholson was a visiting professor from 2011-2012 at the Massachusetts Institute of Technology (MIT) in Comparative Media Studies and the Singapore-MIT GAMBIT Game Lab. While at MIT, Nicholson presented a keynote on escape rooms during the Escape Room Game Jam in partnership between MIT and Red Bull on March 28, 2015.

In 2014 Nicholson moved to Canada to become program director of Wilfrid Laurier University's Game Design & Development program and director of the Brantford Games Network.

== Board Games with Scott ==
Nicholson created and ran a YouTube series called "Board Games with Scott" from 2005 to 2010 in which Nicholson explained and discussed various board and card games for his viewers. He was a pioneer as this was the first board game video series on YouTube. The series garnered some popularity with over 2.8 million views on his channel as of 2018.

== Published works ==
=== Book ===
Nicholson wrote Unlocking the Potential of Puzzle-based Learning: Designing Escape Rooms and Games for the Classroom (2021) which helps educators design escape games and puzzles for their classrooms. The book was published by Sage/Corwin and co-authored by classroom educator Liz Cable.

Nicholson wrote Everyone Plays at the Library (2010) which "[o]ffers suggestions to librarians for creating gaming programs for all age groups in public, academic, and school libraries, focusing on five distinct archetypes and how they connect to library goals."

=== Games ===
Cthulhu Live, 1st Edition (1997) is a live action role-playing game that Nicholson had helped develop a live action combat system that did not require any padded weapons so that the game could be accessible.

Inspired by the events of the first bubble market in Europe in the 1630s, Tulipmania 1637 is a strategy auction game where players take on the roles of investors trying to make money off of the tulip market before the market crashes.

Going, Going, GONE! is a real-time auction party-game where players bid for sets of items using bucks to earn points.

A Breakout EDU game where players take on the role of a volunteer at a local polling station and must get to the bottom of what's happening to the ballots. Ballot Box Bumble won Best Non-Digital Game at the juried Game Expo at the Meaningful Play conference in 2016.

Nicholson was the lead of the design team for the Red Bull Escape Game World Championships in 2017 (Budapest) and 2019 (London). He led a team of students from Wilfrid Laurier University to create the challenges which were then built on-set by construction teams.
