= Beta Phi Mu =

American library science honor society

- ΒΦΜ
- Founded: August 1948; 78 years ago University of Illinois at Urbana-Champaign
- Type: Honor
- Affiliation: ACHS
- Status: Active
- Emphasis: Library and information science
- Scope: National
- Motto: Bibliothekarios philax mathesis "Librarians are the guardians of knowledge"
- Colors: Purple and White
- Symbol: Dolphin, Anchor
- Publication: The Pipeline
- Chapters: 31 (active)
- Members: 23,000 active 40,000+ lifetime
- Headquarters: Beta Phi Mu Honor Society; PO Box 292992; Davie, Florida 33329; United States
- Website: www.betaphimu.org

Beta Phi Mu (ΒΦΜ or βφμ) is an American honor society for library and information science and information technology. Founded by a group of librarians and library educators, the society's express purpose is to recognize and encourage "superior academic achievement" among library and information studies students. Beta Phi Mu has 31 active chapters in the United States and abroad. It sponsors various publications, and funds several scholarships.

The printer's mark of Aldus Manutius, the dolphin and anchor seen here on a 1558 title page, serves as the insignia of Beta Phi Mu.

== History ==
Beta Phi Mu was founded in August 1948 at the University of Illinois at Urbana-Champaign Its founders were library educators and leading librarians. Beta Phi Mu was created as an honor society for information sciences to recognize the notable achievements within the profession. Rolland Stevens was its first president and Harold Lancour was its first executive secretary.

Beta Phi Mu held its first initiation in Illinois in the spring of 1949 at the University of Illinois. In 1954, it presented its first Distinguished Service to Library Education Award; the award became an official award of the American Library Association in 1956.

The oldest library honor society in the United States, local Pi Lambda Sigma founded in 1903 at Syracuse University, became a chapter of Beta Phi Mu in 1959.

Beta Phi Mu was admitted to the Association of College Honor Societies in 1969. The society becomes an affiliate of the American Library Association in 1998. As of August 2012, ΒΦΜ had initiated 40,000 members. In 2024, it has 23,000 active members.

The archives of Beta Phi Mu are at the University of Illinois at Urbana-Champaign.

== Symbols ==
The society's name comes from the initials in the Greek phrase Bibliothekarios philax mathesis, meaning "the librarian is the guardian of knowledge". Its motto is "Aliis inserviendo consumor" or "consumed in the service of others". A dolphin and anchor, the mark of Venetian printer Aldus Manutius, serves as the society's insignia. The society's colors, as signified on honor cords, are purple and white. Its publication is The Pipeline.

== Activities ==
The society presents the Beta Phi Mu Award to a library school faculty member or an individual for distinguished service to education for librarianship. The first award was made in 1954 to Rudolph Hjalmar Gjelsness, dean of the University of Michigan's Library Science Department from 1940 to 1964.

Beta Phi Mu has a scholarship program for beginning students, members seeking continuing education and foreign study, and doctoral students. One of its main activities is the publication of its Monograph Series.

== Membership ==
Eligibility for membership in Beta Phi Mu is by invitation of the faculty from an ALA-accredited professional degree program. Invitations are extended only to individuals who complete the requirements for a master's degree and achieve at least a 3.75 (out of 4.0) GPA; invitations are further limited to a maximum of 25% of any given graduating class. Each eligible candidate must also be recommended for election by the faculty of the candidate’s school.

== Chapters ==
Beta Phi Mu has 31 active chapters in the United States and abroad.

== Notable members ==
- Alphonse F. Trezza (honorary)

== See also ==
- Honor society
- Professional fraternities and sororities
