= Minnesota Library Association =

Professional Association for librarians in Minnesota

- Formation: December 29, 1891; 134 years ago
- Founder: William Watts Folwell
- Purpose: advocacy
- Headquarters: Minneapolis, Minnesota
- Website: mnlibraryassociation.org

The Minnesota Library Association (MLA) is a professional association and state chapter of the American Library Association, headquartered in Minneapolis, Minnesota.

== Mission ==
MLA's mission states: "The Minnesota Library Association is an association of library supporters, representing all types of libraries by helping them accomplish together what none can do alone. MLA serves the interests of its members by facilitating educational opportunities, supporting strong ethical standards, providing legislative assistance, and fostering connections between the library community and various constituencies."

== History ==
Minnesota was one of the first states to establish a state library association, following New York, New Hampshire, Massachusetts, Illinois, and New Jersey as Melvil Dewey encouraged state library associations "to carry on the rapidly developing modern library work." The Minnesota Library Association organized and held the first meeting on December 29, 1891, initiated by William Watts Folwell. The first officers elected at the 1891 meeting included William Watts Folwell (president), Helen J. McCaine (vice president), and J.F. Williams (secretary).

The first meeting was publicized in an announcement in the St. Paul Pioneer Press. The initial meeting was held at the Minnesota Historical Society in St. Paul, MN, and the purpose of the first meeting was to organize a state library association by using a plan recommended by the American Library Association. Early meetings usually consisted of presented papers and discussions, and the 1896 annual meeting was collaborative with the Minnesota Education Association. Gratia Countryman, secretary of MLA at the time, elaborated, "early in the history of the association, librarians recognized that schools and libraries should cooperate closely as the two arms of the educational system."

Amendments to the MLA constitution in 1898 allowed for membership to be extended to any individual interested in libraries, and it was determined that future annual meetings were to occur in October with locations determined by the executive committee. Also important during this time period, MLA passed two resolutions supporting legislation to establish a state library commission and create a system of traveling libraries. This bill was passed in 1899 and was considered a major accomplishment for MLA. The Minnesota Public Library Commission began in 1900, and Clara Baldwin served as the first librarian. Another resolution was passed in 1899 requesting that a library science course be added to the curriculum at the University of Minnesota. This was approved, and courses were soon offered.

Various sections were created in the following years including Trustees, Traveling Library, Children’s Librarians, Public Library, Education, and College and Reference Librarians. The 1908 annual meeting occurred at the ALA Annual Conference that was held at Lake Minnetonka. Also during the early 1900s, MLA had joint meetings with other state associations including the Wisconsin Library Association in 1909 and the North Dakota Library Association in 1910.

Membership originally was a one dollar fee with no annual dues. By 1898, annual dues were set at fifty cents. Membership dues continued to increase, but as of 1910, there were 125 members. Recruitment became a priority in 1921, only to be permanently tabled during the Depression when new graduates could not find jobs.

During and between the two World Wars, MLA made important administrative decisions that impacted its own structure, its relationships with the State of Minnesota, and with the American Library Association. MLA adopted a new constitution that redrafted the slate of officers, changed the makeup of the executive committee, and introduced institutional memberships. By 1939, members approved another new constitution. Each successive constitution both reflected and defined MLA’s activities. By-laws were added that named standing committees, detailed duties of the officers, and created procedures to establish sections.

The MLA continued to influence state legislation. It successfully recommended merging the Public Library Commission with the Minnesota Department of Education (1919), allowing small town school libraries to double as public libraries (1929), and requiring certification of school librarians (1935). In 1938-40 biennium, the Library Planning Division worked with the Library Division of the MDE to develop the first legislative platform.

The American Library Association’s influence guided much of MLA’s plans and decisions. MLA followed ALA’s lead on such issues as children’s services, certification and standardization. MLA became a chapter of ALA in 1921, and a leader in working with other state associations.

== Social issues ==
Since World War II, MLA has taken a stand on social issues by supporting a nuclear freeze (1983), exploring arbitration for non-union librarians (1976), and voicing support for independent booksellers (1987).

In 1997 when heavy rains flooded many Minnesota libraries, MLA established a Disaster Relief Fund.

== Current and past presidents ==
The following persons have been president of the association:

- 2017 Amy Boese
- 2016 Margaret Stone
- 2015 Maggie Snow
- 2014 Michele McGraw
- 2013 Kristen Mastel
- 2012 Carla Urban
- 2011 Robin Ewing
- 2010 Kathleen James
- 2009 Ken Behringer
- 2008 Wendy Wendt
- 2007 Heidi Hoks
- 2006 Audrey Betcher
- 2005 Marlene Moulton Janssen
- 2004 Bill Sozansky
- 2003 Melissa Brechon
- 2002 Carol Johnson
- 2001 Chris Olson
- 2000 Joan B. Larson
- 1999 Beth Kelly
- 1998 Mary Martin
- 1997 Barbara Jauquet-Kalinoski
- 1996 Mark Ranum
- 1995 Linda DeBeau-Melting
- 1994 Linda DeBeau-Melting
- 1993 David Barton
- 1992 Janet Kinney
- 1991 Gretchen Wronka
- 1990 Muriel J. Rossman
- 1989/88 Michael Haeuser
- 1988 Mona Carmack
- 1987, Janice Feye-Stukas
- 1986 Donald Pearce
- 1985 Joseph Kimbrough
- 1983/84 Michael Kathman
- 1982/83 Marlys O'Brien
- 1981/82 Mary Wagner
- 1980/81 Patricia Harpole
- 1979/80 Jerry Young
- 1978/79 Nancy Olson
- 1977/78 Mary Heiges
- 1976/77 Janet Schroeder
- 1975/76 Dale Carrison
- 1974/75 Barbara Hughes
- 1973/74 Geraldine King
- 1972/73 Edward Swanson
- 1971/72 David Smith
- 1970/71 Gil Johnsson
- 1969/70 Helen Young
- 1968/69 Luther Brown
- 1967/68 Roderick MacDonald
- 1966/67 James Ubel
- 1965/66 Willard Donahue
- 1964/65 Marie Knudson
- 1962/64 George Gardner
- 1961/62 Arlene Russell
- 1960/61 Robert Simonds
- 1959/60 Merle Lennartson
- 1958/59 Robert Rohlf
- 1957/58 David Berninghausen
- 1956/57 Erana Stadler
- 1955/56 Helen Sweasy
- 1954/55 David Watkins
- 1953/54 Alice Brunat
- 1952/53 Maurine Hoffmann
- 1951/52 Anita Saxine
- 1950/51 Mary Baker
- 1949/50 Agatha Klein
- 1948/49 Glenn Lewis
- 1947/48 Donald Strout
- 1946/47 Lucille Gottry
- 1945/46 Emily Mayne
- 1944/45 Jean Gardiner Smith
- 1943/44 Rella Havens
- 1942/43 Elizabeth Bond
- 1941/42 Eileen Thornton
- 1940/41 Florence Love
- 1939/40 Hazel Halgrim
- 1938/39 Ruth Rosholt
- 1937/38 Jane Morey
- 1936/37 Lura Hutchinson
- 1935/36 Eleanor Hermann
- 1934/35 Irma Walker
- 1933/34 Alma Penrose
- 1932/33 Ethel Berry
- 1931/32 Grace Stevens
- 1930/31 Perrie Jones
- 1929/30 Edna Moore
- 1928/29 Dorothy Hurlbert
- 1927/28 Stella Bertleson
- 1926/27 Harriet Wood
- 1925/26 Adeline Davidson
- 1924/25 Ethel McCubrey
- 1923/24 Webster Wheelock
- 1922/23 Frank Walter
- 1921/22 Alice Dunlap
- 1920/21 Ruth Rosholt
- 1919/20 Miriam Carey
- 1918/19 Jenny Lind Blachard
- 1917/18 Dorothy Hurlbert
- 1916/17 Mable Newhard
- 1915/16 Frances Earhart
- 1914/15 W. Dawson Johnston
- 1913/14 Martha Wilson
- 1912/13 James Gerould
- 1911/12 Margaret Palmer
- 1910/11 Helen McCaine
- 1909/10 Clara Baldwin
- 1907/09 Warren Upham
- 1906/07 Lettie Crafts
- 1905/06 Maude VanBuren
- 1904/05 Gratia Countryman
- 1903/04 Katherine Beals
- 1902/03 Victor Nilsson
- 1900/02 Alice Farr
- 1891/00 William Watts Folwell

== See also ==
- List of libraries in the United States
