= Margaret E. Monroe =

Margaret E. Monroe (1914-2004) served as Professor and Director of the Library School (now the Information School) at the University of Wisconsin–Madison from 1963 until 1970. She was on the forefront of the movement to develop library services for persons and groups with special needs, such as the disadvantaged, institutionalized, and aged.

== Education ==
Monroe was born in New York City. She received a bachelor’s degree in English and a bachelor’s degree in librarianship from New York State College in Albany. She received a master’s degree in English and a doctorate from Columbia University.

== Career ==
She served in various capacities at the New York Public Library for thirteen years.

She was director of the American Heritage Project of the American Library Association from 1951 to 1954.

She was on the faculty of the Graduate School of Library Science at Rutgers University (1954-63). In 1962 she wrote the essay, "The Library's Collection in a Time of Crisis" which Wayne Wiegand characterized as "articulating a core principle grounding our current professional conviction that libraries serve as a cornerstone of democracy."

Monroe served as Professor and Director of the Library School at the University of Wisconsin – Madison from 1963 until 1970.

While Monroe was Director of the UW Library School, she initiated the Ph. D degree and an Advanced Studies Certificate. Major outside funding was received by the Library School for research on library services to adults. In 1970 she returned to full time teaching at the library school. Her work is noted for her focus on the library in the life of the user.

Monroe was a national leader in adult services in libraries and in 1985 the American Library Association established the Margaret E. Monroe Library Adult Services Award to honor individuals who have made significant contributions to library adult services. Monroe saw the library as an agent for change even before there were words to describe this concept, and her view of the democratic role of the library underscored practically every position she took.

She retired as Professor Emeritus in 1981.

== Association contributions ==
Monroe was president of the Adult Services Division of the American Library Association (ALA). She was chair of the Committee on Accreditation of ALA. She served on the Council of ALA.

She was president of the Association of American Library Schools (Now ALISE-Association for Library and Information Science Education).

She was active in the Wisconsin Library Association serving as chair of the Wisconsin Public Library Association and the Intellectual Freedom Committee.

== Honors ==
- 2009-Inducted into the Wisconsin Library Hall of Fame at the Wisconsin Library Association Conference in Appleton, Wisconsin, October 22, 2009.
- 1985-American Library Association established the Margaret E. Monroe Library Adult Services Award in 1985 to honor individuals who have made significant contributions to library adult services.
- 1982-Festschrift in Monroe's Honor. Schlachter, Gail A. (1982). The Service Imperative for Libraries: Essays in Honor of Margaret E. Monroe. Littleton, Colo.: Libraries Unlimited..
- 1981-Boll, John J., ed. (1982). Reader Services in Libraries: A Day in Honor of Margaret E. Monroe. Madison: Library School of the University of Wisconsin–Madison.
- 1972-Beta Phi Mu Award for Distinguished Service to Education for Librarianship.

== Selected publications ==
- Monroe, Margaret Ellen (2006). Margaret Monroe: Memoirs of a Public Librarian (1st ed.). Madison, Wis.: Parallel Press, University of Wisconsin-Madison Libraries.
- Pollack, Miriam (1982). "Margaret E. Monroe: Bibliography". In Schlachter, Gail A. (ed.). The Service Imperative for Libraries: Essays in Honor of Margaret E. Monroe. Littleton, Colo.: Libraries Unlimited. p. 189.
- Monroe, Margaret Ellen; McCook, Kathleen de la Peña; United States Office of Educational Research and Improvement, Library Programs (1991). Partners for Lifelong Learning: Public Libraries & Adult Education. Washington, D.C.: Office of Library Programs, U.S. Dept. of Education, Office of Educational Research and Improvement.
- Monroe, Margaret Ellen; Rubin, Rhea Joyce (1983). The Challenge of Aging: A Bibliography. Littleton, Colo.: Libraries Unlimited.
- Monroe, M. E. (1981). "Issues in field experience as an element in the library school curriculum". Journal of Education for Librarianship. 22: 57–73. doi:10.2307/40322681. JSTOR 40322681.
- Monroe, M. E. (1979). "Adult services in the third millennium". RQ. 18: 267–273.
- Monroe, Margaret E.; Heim, Kathleen M. (Fall 1979). "Emerging Patterns of Community Service". Library Trends (Special issue). 28 (2).
- Monroe, Margaret E. (1976). "A Conceptual Framework for the Public Library as a Community Learning Center for Independent Study". The Library Quarterly. 46 (1): 54–61. doi:10.1086/620466.
- Monroe, M. E.; Monroe, M. E.; Rubin, R. J. (1975). "Bibliotherapy". Libri: International Journal of Libraries & Information Services. 25: 156–162.
- Monroe, Margaret Ellen (1963). Library Adult Education, the Biography of an Idea. New York: Scarecrow Press.
- Monroe, M. E. (1962). "Library's collection in a time of crisis". Wilson Library Bulletin. 36: 372–374.
- Monroe, Margaret Ellen (1962). The Evolving Conception of Adult Education in Three Public Libraries: 1920-1955 (PhD). Ann Arbor, Mich.: University Microfilms.
- Monroe, Margaret Ellen; Kenny, Patricia Mary (1954). Planning Your Program for American Heritage Discussion. Chicago: American Heritage Project of the American Library Association.
- Monroe, M. E. (1953). "Public library's role in adult education". ALA Bulletin. 47: 155–157.
