= Reynolds, North Dakota =

- City
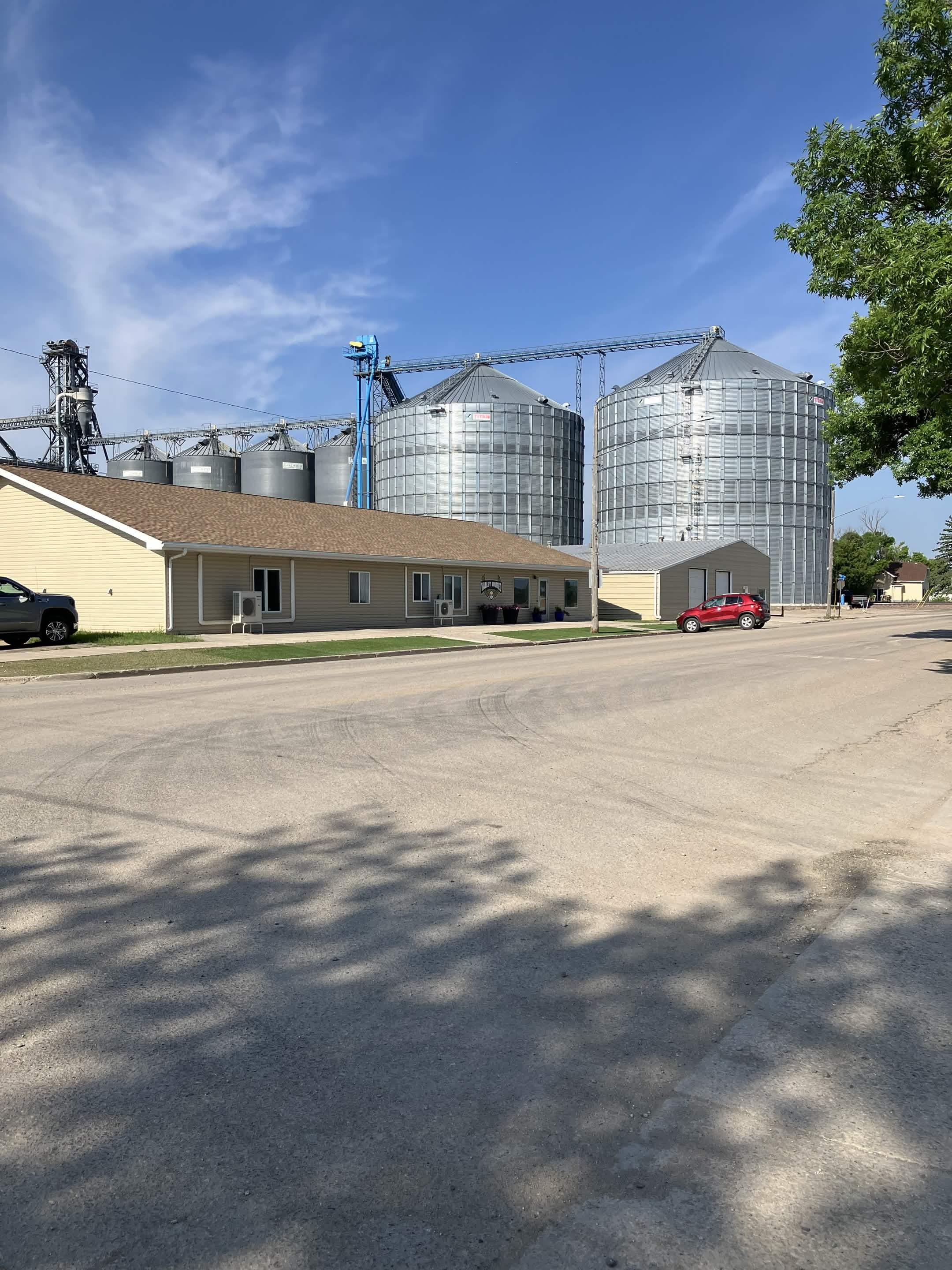

- Seal

- Location of Reynolds, North Dakota
- Coordinates: 47°40′07″N 97°06′21″W
- Country: United States
- State: North Dakota
- Counties: Traill, Grand Forks
- Metro: Greater Grand Forks
- Founded: 1881

Government
  - Mayor: David Scholand

Area
  - Total: 0.778 sq mi (2.016 km^{2})
  - Land: 0.778 sq mi (2.016 km^{2})
  - Water: 0 sq mi (0.000 km^{2})
- Elevation: 909 ft (277 m)

Population (2020)
  - Total: 277
  - Estimate (2023): 268
  - Density: 355.8/sq mi (137.38/km^{2})
- Time zone: UTC–6 (Central (CST))
  - Summer (DST): UTC–5 (CDT)
- ZIP Code: 58275
- Area code: 701
- FIPS code: 38-66260
- GNIS feature ID: 1036236
- Website: reynoldsnd.com

Reynolds is a city in Grand Forks and Traill counties in the State of North Dakota. It is part of the Grand Forks, ND-MN Metropolitan Statistical Area or "Greater Grand Forks". The population was 277 at the 2020 census. Reynolds, named for pioneer settler Dr. Henry Reynolds, was founded in 1881.

== Geography ==
According to the United States Census Bureau, the city has a total area of 0.779 square miles (2.02 km^{2}), all land.

The southern section of Reynolds is actually in Traill County.

== Demographics ==
Historical population
Census	Pop.	Note	%±
1900	389		—
1910	412		5.9%
1920	389		−5.6%
1930	351		−9.8%
1940	315		−10.3%
1950	335		6.3%
1960	269		−19.7%
1970	236		−12.3%
1980	309		30.9%
1990	299		−3.2%
2000	350		17.1%
2010	301		−14.0%
2020	277		−8.0%
2023 (est.)	268		−3.2%
U.S. Decennial Census; 2020 Census

=== 2010 census ===
As of the 2010 census, there were 301 people, 125 households, and 88 families living in the city. The population density was 449.3 inhabitants per square mile (173.5/km^{2}). There were 127 housing units at an average density of 189.6 per square mile (73.2/km^{2}). The racial makeup of the city was 97.7% White, 0.7% African American, 1.0% Native American, and 0.7% Asian. Hispanic or Latino of any race were 2.3% of the population.

There were 125 households, of which 34.4% had children under the age of 18 living with them, 62.4% were married couples living together, 4.8% had a female householder with no husband present, 3.2% had a male householder with no wife present, and 29.6% were non-families. 29.6% of all households were made up of individuals, and 11.2% had someone living alone who was 65 years of age or older. The average household size was 2.41 and the average family size was 2.98.

The median age in the city was 41.1 years. 24.6% of residents were under the age of 18; 5.6% were between the ages of 18 and 24; 29.6% were from 25 to 44; 29.2% were from 45 to 64; and 11% were 65 years of age or older. The gender makeup of the city was 48.8% male and 51.2% female.

=== 2000 census ===
As of the 2000 census, there were 350 people, 130 households, and 95 families living in the city. The population density was 525.2 inhabitants per square mile (202.8/km^{2}). There were 135 housing units at an average density of 202.6 per square mile (78.2/km^{2}). The racial makeup of the city was 98.00% White, 0.29% Native American, 0.29% Asian, 0.86% from other races, and 0.57% from two or more races. Hispanic or Latino of any race were 1.14% of the population.

There were 130 households, out of which 39.2% had children under the age of 18 living with them, 69.2% were married couples living together, 0.8% had a female householder with no husband present, and 26.2% were non-families. 24.6% of all households were made up of individuals, and 15.4% had someone living alone who was 65 years of age or older. The average household size was 2.69 and the average family size was 3.21.

In the city, the population was spread out, with 29.4% under the age of 18, 6.3% from 18 to 24, 32.0% from 25 to 44, 18.3% from 45 to 64, and 14.0% who were 65 years of age or older. The median age was 36 years. For every 100 females, there were 90.2 males. For every 100 females age 18 and over, there were 99.2 males.

The median income for a household in the city was $48,750, and the median income for a family was $52,500. Males had a median income of $32,500 versus $21,500 for females. The per capita income for the city was $17,019. None of the families and 1.2% of the population were living below the poverty line, including no under eighteens and 6.1% of those over 64.

== Transportation ==
Amtrak’s Empire Builder, which operates between Seattle/Portland and Chicago, passes through the town on BNSF tracks, but makes no stop. The nearest station is located in Grand Forks, 21 miles (34 km) to the north.

== Education ==
It is within the Central Valley Public School District 3.

== Notable people ==
- Rudolph Hjalmar Gjelsness, born in Reynolds (1894), librarian
- Reuben Harold Tweten, born in Reynolds (1899), farmer and Minnesota state representative
