= Reuben Harold Tweten =

American politician and farmer (1899–1986)

Member of the Minnesota House of Representatives from the 66th district
- In office January 6, 1947 – January 6, 1957

Personal details
- Born: March 15, 1899 Reynolds, North Dakota, U.S.
- Died: May 12, 1986 (aged 87) Fosston, Minnesota, U.S.
- Spouse: Ruth Haugstul (m. 1924)
- Children: 1
- Occupation: Politician, farmer

Reuben Harold Tweten (March 15, 1899 – May 12, 1986) was an American politician and farmer.

Tweten was born in Reynolds, North Dakota, and went to business college in Minneapolis, Minnesota. He grew up in McIntosh, Minnesota, and then lived in Fosston, Polk County, Minnesota, with his wife and family. Tweten was a farmer and cattle breeder and was involved in the Polk County Fair. He served in the Minnesota House of Representatives from 1947 to 1956. He died at Fosston Memorial Hospital in Fosston, Minnesota.
