= Intellectual freedom =

Freedom to hold, receive and disseminate ideas without restriction

Intellectual freedom encompasses the freedom to hold, receive and disseminate ideas without restriction. Viewed as an integral component of a democratic society, intellectual freedom protects an individual's right to access, explore, consider, and express ideas and information as the basis for a self-governing, well-informed citizenry. Intellectual freedom comprises the bedrock for freedoms of expression, speech, and the press and relates to freedoms of information and the right to privacy.

The United Nations upholds intellectual freedom as a basic human right through Article 19 of the Universal Declaration of Human Rights which asserts:

Everyone has the right to freedom of opinion and expression; this right includes freedom to hold opinions without interference and to seek, receive and impart information and ideas through any media and regardless of frontiers.

The institution of libraries in particular values intellectual freedom as part of their mission to provide and protect access to information and ideas. The American Library Association (ALA) defines intellectual freedom as "the right of every individual to both seek and receive information from all points of view without restriction. It provides for free access to all expressions of ideas through which any and all sides of a question, cause or movement can be explored."

The modern concept of intellectual freedom developed out of an opposition to book censorship. It is promoted by several professions and movements. These entities include, among others, librarianship, education, and the free software movement.

== Issues ==
Intellectual freedom encompasses many areas including issues of academic freedom, Internet filtering, and censorship. Because proponents of intellectual freedom value an individual's right to choose informational concepts and media to formulate thought and opinion without repercussion, restrictions to access and barriers to privacy of information constitute intellectual freedom issues. Issues surrounding restrictions to access include:

- banned books, book burning, and challenges to literature
- censorship and attempts to censor including, but not limited to book censorship, film censorship, censorship of music, censorship of maps, censorship of individual words, censorship of comic books, and video game censorship
- self-censorship by authors, editors, journalists, or library materials selectors
- internet filtering through content-control software
- internet filtering through internet censorship
- internet safety legislation and initiatives such as Children's Internet Protection Act (CIPA) and Neighborhood Internet Protection Act (NCIPA)
- net neutrality
- government information and freedom of information laws

Issues concerning barriers to privacy of information include:

- data mining
- surveillance
- data protection and information privacy laws and practices
- confidentiality of library users' records of access
- legislation that suspends civil liberties in the name of national security such as the Patriot Act and the Homeland Security Act

While proponents of intellectual freedom work to prohibit acts of censorship, calls for censorship are valued as free speech. "In expressing their opinions and concerns, would-be censors are exercising the same rights librarians seek to protect when they confront censorship. In making their criticisms known, people who object to certain ideas are exercising the same rights as those who created and disseminated the material to which they object." The first amendment right to voice opinions and persuade others—both for the exclusion and inclusion of content and concepts—should be protected.

== History ==
The contemporary definition, limits, and inclusions of intellectual freedom primarily developed through a number of common law judgments by the United States Supreme Court regarding the First Amendment and policy statements of groups dedicated to the advocacy and defense of civil liberties.

=== Abrams v. United States (1919) ===
In his oft-quoted dissent on the free speech case of two defendants convicted of inciting anti-war sentiment and action, Supreme Court justice Oliver Wendell Holmes Jr. aligns the freedoms of speech and expression with the freedom of thought as follows:

Persecution for the expression of opinions seems to me perfectly logical. If you have no doubt of your premises or your power and want a certain result with all your heart you naturally express your wishes in law and sweep away all opposition . . . But when men have realized that time has upset many fighting faiths, they may come to believe even more than they believe the very foundations of their own conduct that the ultimate good desired is better reached by free trade in ideas. . . The best test of truth is the power of the thought to get itself accepted in the competition of the market, and that truth is the only ground upon which their wishes can be safely carried out."

=== Whitney v. California (1927) ===
A case in which the Supreme Court sustains the conviction of a woman for anti-government speech akin to terrorism. In his opinion on the matter, Justice Brandeis delineates the role of freedom of thought to inform free speech, attributing the value of intellectual freedom as a civil liberty to the founders of the United States, asserting:

Those who won our independence believed that the final end of the state was to make men free to develop their faculties. . . They believed that freedom to think as you will and to speak as you think are means indispensable to the discovery and spread of political truth.

=== Olmstead v. United States (1928) ===
A case in which the US Supreme Court deliberated whether a citizen's Fourth or Fifth Amendment rights were violated when evidence to convict him of bootlegging was obtained through wiretapping. Justice Brandeis provides precedence for the inclusion of intellectual freedom as a constitutional right in his dissenting opinion, claiming the US Constitution's authors "recognized the significance of man's spiritual nature, his feelings, and his intellect" and "sought to protect Americans in their beliefs, their thoughts, their emotions and their sensations." Brandeis would ultimately argue for the right to privacy, another important dimension of intellectual freedom, as an extension of American civil rights.

=== United States v. Schwimmer (1929) ===
In the Supreme Court's upheld decision to deny citizenship to Rosika Schwimmer, a Hungarian immigrant, because she refused to pledge to take up arms to defend the United States out of her pacifist views and beliefs, Justice Oliver Wendell Holmes Jr. personally disagrees with the defendant's views but professionally upholds Schwimmer's position when he writes,

Some of her answers might excite popular prejudice, but if there is any principle of the Constitution that more imperatively calls for attachment than any other it is the principle of free thought – not free thought for those who agree with us but freedom for the thought we hate.

=== Library Bill of Rights (1939) ===
The American Library Association adopts the Library Bill of Rights affirming "that all libraries are forums for information and ideas." Originally a three-point declaration to guide services in American free public libraries including statements on "growing intolerance, suppression of free speech, and censorship," today the Library Bill of Rights includes six basic policies to guide library services that affirm intellectual freedom.

=== Universal Declaration of Human Rights (1948) ===
Following World War II, the United Nations adopts The Universal Declaration of Human Rights as a "foundation of human rights law" consisting of 30 articles on international freedoms among the nations of the UN General Assembly. Articles 18 and 19 specifically affirm rights to freedoms of thought, opinion, and expression, as well as the right to "seek, receive, and impart information and ideas through any media and regardless of frontiers."

=== Lauterbach Award acceptance speech (1953) ===
In his 1953 acceptance speech for the Lauterbach Award for support of civil liberties, Supreme Court justice William O. Douglas affirms that "safety of our civilization lies in making freedom of thought and freedom of speech vital, vivid features of life" and condemns "[r]estriction of free thought and free speech," labeling it "the most dangerous of all subversions," and an "un-American act."

=== The Freedom to Read (1953) ===
The American Library Association adopts The Freedom to Read, a key library policy endorsing an individual's civil rights to free expression and intellectual freedom through the exchange of ideas through reading and writing. The ALA's The Freedom to Read includes seven affirmations and responsibilities to protect an individual's right to read as a basic tenet of democracy. In 1979, the ALA expands upon The Freedom to Read, adopting The Freedom to View, a policy which extends the understanding of intellectual freedom to include the visual acquisition of information through visual media such as art, video, movies, pictures, the internet, and more.

=== Brandenburg v Ohio (1969) ===
A case in which the US Supreme Court established the Imminent Lawless Action standard. The Supreme Court overturned KKK leader, Clarence Brandenburg's conviction of one to ten years in prison and a fine of $1000 sentenced by the Court of Common Pleas of Hamilton County. The Court ruled that hate speech is protected under First Amendment rights as long as it does not incite violence. This ruling established the modern doctrine of clear and present danger which determines what limits may be placed on First Amendment freedoms. Only speech that directly incites lawless action may be restricted.

== Intellectual freedom and librarianship ==
The profession of librarianship views intellectual freedom as a core responsibility. The International Federation of Library Associations and Institutions' (IFLA) Statement on Libraries and Intellectual Freedom "calls upon libraries and library staff to adhere to the principles of intellectual freedom, uninhibited access to information and freedom of expression and to recognize the privacy of library user." IFLA urges its members to actively promote the acceptance and realization of intellectual freedom principles. IFLA states: "The right to know is a requirement for freedom of thought and conscience; freedom of thought and freedom of expression are necessary conditions for freedom of access to information."

Individual national library associations expand upon these principles when defining intellectual freedom for their constituents. For example, the American Library Association defines intellectual freedom as: "[T]he right of every individual to both seek and receive information from all points of view without restriction. It provides for free access to all expressions of ideas through which any and all sides of a question, cause or movement may be explored. .... Intellectual freedom encompasses the freedom to hold, receive and disseminate ideas."

The Canadian Library Association's Position Statement on Intellectual Freedom states that all persons possess "the fundamental right ... to have access to all expressions of knowledge, creativity and intellectual activity, and to express their thoughts publicly." This right was enshrined into law in 2004 in British Columbia, which grants protection against litigation for libraries for their holdings.

Many other national library associations have similarly adopted statements on intellectual freedom.

The ALA's Office for Intellectual Freedom organizes the relationship between librarianship and intellectual freedom into five distinct categories:

- The library user's access to information through a library collection
- The librarian's professional responsibilities to select a diverse collection of library materials for users and protect library users' confidentiality and rights to privacy in their use of library materials
- The librarian's personal rights to free expression and choices of lifestyle and public participation without professional repercussion
- The library's institutional role as an agent of social change, democracy, and education
- The issue of advocacy v. neutrality for libraries and librarians

Libraries protect, defend, and advocate for intellectual freedom through a variety of organizations and resources.

=== Intellectual Freedom Committee ===
The Intellectual Freedom Committee (IFC) is a council committee of the American Library Association (ALA), composed of 11 ALA members who are appointed by ALA's Council to serve 2-year terms. The Intellectual Freedom Committee functions as an advisory and educational arm of the ALA's commitment to intellectual freedom. The IFC recommends policies concerning intellectual freedom and censorship, drafts guidelines for library professionals to advocate and defend intellectual freedom including The Universal Right to Free Expression and Importance of Education to Intellectual Freedom, and drafts policy statements adopted by the ALA including several interpretation statements on the Library Bill of Rights such as:

- Access to Electronic Information, Services, and Networks
- Access to Library Resources and Services Regardless of Gender or Sexual Orientation
- Free Access to Libraries for Minors
- Prisoners' Right to Read
- Statement on Library Use of Filtering Software

The IFC drafts and submits statements to the ALA as part of the committee's charge to "recommend such steps as may be necessary to safeguard the rights of library users, libraries, and librarians, in accordance with the first amendment to the united states constitution and the Library Bill of Rights as adopted by the ALA Council [and] work closely with the Office for Intellectual Freedom and with other units and officers of the association in matters touching intellectual freedom and censorship."

Formed in 1940 and originally titled 'Committee on Intellectual Freedom to Safeguard the Rights of Library Users to Freedom of Inquiry,' the committee has also been known as 'Committee on Intellectual Freedom' before the currently titled 'Intellectual Freedom Committee.' Following the ALA's formation of the IFC to promote intellectual freedom on a national level, many regional and state library associations have established additional intellectual freedom committees on the state level.

=== Office for Intellectual Freedom ===
The American Library Association's Office for Intellectual Freedom (OIF) serves as an administrative arm of ALA committees such as the Intellectual Freedom Committee and the Committee on Professional Ethics. Principally charged with implementing ALA policies concerning intellectual freedom, the OIF focuses efforts on intellectual freedom education and coordination of intellectual freedom activities, events, and organizations and views the "responsibility of the office to recommend, develop, implement, and maintain a total intellectual freedom program for ALA. OIF functions include:

- Banned Books Week, an annual event that celebrates the freedom to read sponsored by publishing, bookselling, civil rights, teaching, and library organizations associated with intellectual freedom.
- Choose Privacy Week, an annual event that promotes conversation and provides resources for individuals to think more critically about digital-age privacy rights. The OIF partners with many national coalitions focused upon digital rights and privacy such as the American Civil Liberties Union (ACLU), the Center for Information Policy Research (CIPR), the Center For Democracy & Technology, the Electronic Frontier Foundation (EFF), the Electronic Privacy Information Center (EPIC), and Privacy Rights Clearinghouse (PRC).
- Frequently Challenged Books List, a database of challenged materials collected from news reports and individuals (often through the OIF's electronic Challenge Reporting Form. Although the database provides information on banned books, challenged books, frequently challenged authors, and challenged classics since 1990, the OIF asserts that they "do not claim comprehensiveness in recording challenges as research suggests that for each challenge reported there are as many as four or five that go unreported."
- Newsletter on Intellectual Freedom (NIF), a bimonthly digital publication serving as "the only journal that reports attempts to remove materials from school and library shelves across the country."
- Intellectual Freedom Action Network (IFAN), an ad hoc, grassroots group of volunteers who liaison between the national efforts of the OIF and intellectual freedom issues within members' communities. IFAN members monitor censorship issues in their communities and lend support to anti-censorship and intellectual freedom instances through civic involvement such as letters to the editor or political representatives and/or attendance at public meetings and hearings concerning intellectual freedom.
- IFACTION, an e-list education forum on intellectual freedom issues and concepts that replaced the OIF's former print newsletter, Intellectual Freedom News.
- Webinars, including a sizable archive of webinars concerning intellectual freedom issues.

=== Intellectual Freedom Round Table ===
The ALA's Intellectual Freedom Round Table (IFRT) functions as a forum for ALA members to participate in intellectual freedom initiatives and efforts. The IFRT serves as a communication channel and promotional group for ALA members seeking increasing participation and knowledge in intellectual freedom concepts and issues. While the IFRT mirrors other intellectual freedom organizations through monitoring, support, and educational efforts, the IFRT provides more varied intellectual freedom discussion forums for librarians in two ways:

- Organizing state and local level intellectual freedom discussion programs and activities
- Planning and sponsoring conference programs on topics related to intellectual freedom

In addition to encouraging and fostering a community of librarians learning, promoting, and defending intellectual freedom principles, the IFRT administers three intellectual freedom awards (see below) and produces an Intellectual Freedom Report to members of the American Library Association four times per year.

=== Freedom to Read Foundation ===
The Freedom to Read Foundation was incorporated in 1969 by members of the American Library Association. Although founded by ALA members, the FTRF is a separate organization from ALA with separate membership focused upon the legal defense of intellectual freedom for libraries, librarians, library staff, and library trustees. While the FTRF participates in intellectual freedom education efforts, the FTRF primarily aims to "support and defend librarians whose positions are jeopardized because of their resistance to abridgments of the First Amendment; and to set legal precedent for the freedom to read on behalf of all the people." In the foundation's commitment to "the principle that the solution to offensive speech is more speech, and the suppression of speech on the grounds that it gives offense to some infringes on the rights of all to a free, open and robust marketplace of ideas," the FTRF awards and distributes grants to aid intellectual freedom litigation, directly participates as a party to intellectual freedom litigation, and submits amicus curiae briefs in freedom of speech and freedom of the press cases. FTRF assistance to library staff whose jobs have been jeopardized due to their defense of intellectual freedom "attempts to obviate the choice between upholding intellectual freedom principles and" what lauded librarian and library-science scholar Lester Asheim called "three square meals a day." The organization's charter describes four purposes for the Foundation, including:

- Promoting and protecting the freedom of speech and of the press;
- Protecting the public's right of access to information and materials stored in the nation's libraries;
- Safeguarding libraries' right to disseminate all materials contained in their collections; and
- Supporting libraries and librarians in their defense of First Amendment rights by supplying them with legal counsel or the means to secure it.

=== LeRoy C. Merritt Humanitarian Fund ===
The LeRoy C. Merritt Humanitarian Fund provides financial assistance to librarians who are:

- "Denied employment rights or discriminated against on the basis of gender, sexual orientation, race, color, creed, religion, age, disability, or place of national origin; or
- Denied employment rights because of defense of intellectual freedom; that is, threatened with loss of employment or discharged because of their stand for the cause of intellectual freedom, including promotion of freedom of the press, freedom of speech, the freedom of librarians to select items for their collections from all the world’s written and recorded information, and defense of privacy rights."

Originally established by the Freedom to Read Foundation in 1970, the Merritt Fund now functions independently, governed by three trustees elected by donors to the fund. The fund's namesake LeRoy C. Merritt participated in the defense and advocacy of intellectual freedom throughout his life in a variety of ways including authoring numerous intellectual freedom and anti-censorship books and articles, editing the ALA's Newsletter on Intellectual Freedom from 1962 to 1970, as the first recipient of the Robert B. Downs Intellectual Freedom Award, and, donating the entirety of the Downs prize to the Freedom to Read Foundation, as the FTRF's first benefactor.

=== Intellectual Freedom Manual ===
The American Library Association's Office for Intellectual Freedom publishes the Intellectual Freedom Manual, now in its ninth edition. Considered an authoritative resource on intellectual freedom for library professionals, it is also of use to members of the public who wish to stay informed of the most recent policies and developments in the field. As well as providing an historical overview of the topic, it is divided into parts which cover key issues such as the Library Bill of Rights, protecting the freedom to read, intellectual freedom and the law, and preserving, protecting and working for intellectual freedom. Expanding on the new addition to the manual is the section on Privacy; an Interpretation of the Library Bill of Rights

=== Collaboration between associated organizations ===
Many of the entities listed above collaborate with one another and other organizations including:

- Association of American Publishers
- American Booksellers Association
- American Booksellers Association for Free Expression
- Center for Democracy and Technology
- Internet Education Foundation
- Media Coalition
- National Coalition Against Censorship
- PEN American Center
- state and regional First Amendment organizations
- state library association intellectual freedom committees
- intellectual freedom coalitions

== Intellectual Freedom Awards ==
=== Robert B. Downs Intellectual Freedom Award ===
Since 1969, the Graduate School of Library and Information Science (GSLIS) at the University of Illinois annually awards the Robert B. Downs Intellectual Freedom Award. GSLIS faculty named this award for Robert B. Downs on his 25th anniversary as director of the School in honor of his role as a champion for intellectual freedom. Downs, also a former president and vice-president of the ALA, focused his library career working against, and voicing opposition to, literary censorship and authored many books and publications on topics of censorship and intellectual freedom. Awarded to acknowledge individuals or groups who have furthered the cause of intellectual freedom in libraries, the Robert B. Downs Intellectual Freedom Award is "[g]ranted to those who have resisted censorship or efforts to abridge the freedom of individuals to read or view materials of their choice, the award may be in recognition of a particular action or long-term interest in, and dedication to, the cause of intellectual freedom."

=== Eli M. Oboler Memorial Award ===
Since 1986, the American Library Association Intellectual Freedom Round Table biennially sponsors the Eli M. Oboler Memorial Award. Consisting of a $500 prize and certificate, the award acknowledges "the best published work in the area of intellectual freedom." The IFRT posthumously named this award for Eli M. Oboler, a former Idaho State University librarian known as a “champion of intellectual freedom who demanded the dismantling of all barriers to freedom of expression.” Oboler, also a former member and officer in numerous intellectual freedom organizations including the Intellectual Freedom Round Table, the ALA Intellectual Freedom Committee, the Freedom to Read Foundation, and the Idaho Library Association's Intellectual Freedom Committee, authored over 200 publications, many on censorship and intellectual freedom, including:

- The Fear of the Word: Censorship and Sex. Metuchen, NJ: Scarecrow Press, 1974.
- Ideas and the University Library: Essays of an Unorthodox Academic Librarian. Westport, CT: Greenwood Press, 1977.
- Defending Intellectual Freedom: The Library and the Censor. Westport, CT: Greenwood Press, 1980.
- To Free the Mind: Libraries, Technology, and Intellectual Freedom. Littleton, CO: Libraries Unlimited, 1983."

Awarded to acknowledge authorship in the area of intellectual freedom, the IFRT considers "single articles (including review pieces), a series of thematically connected articles, books, or manuals published on the local, state or national level in English or English translation" for receipt of the Eli M. Oboler Award.

=== John Phillip Immroth Memorial Award ===
Since 1976, the ALA's Intellectual Freedom Round Table annually sponsors the John Phillip Immroth Memorial Award. Consisting of a $500 prize and a citation, the award "honors the courage, dedication, and contribution of a living individual, group, or organization who has set the finest kind of example for the defense and furtherance of the principles of intellectual freedom." Upon his death in 1979, the award was renamed for John Phillip Immroth, the founder and first Chair of the Intellectual Freedom Round Table. The Immroth award differs from other intellectual freedom awards in that it recognizes "extraordinary personal courage in the defense of intellectual freedom."

=== Gerald Hodges Intellectual Freedom Chapter Relations Award ===
Since 1984, the ALA's Intellectual Freedom Round Table annually sponsors a regional intellectual freedom award, currently named the Gerald Hodges Intellectual Freedom Chapter Relations Award. Consisting of a $1000 prize and citation, the award "recognizes an intellectual freedom focused organization that has developed a strong multi-year, ongoing program or a single, one-year project that exemplifies support for intellectual freedom, patron confidentiality, and anti-censorship efforts." The IFRT posthumously named this award for Gerald Hodges, a longtime ALA officer who devoted his library career to his passion for both intellectual freedom and chapter relations until his death in 2006. In 2010 the Gerald Hodges Intellectual Freedom Award replaced the IFRT State and Regional Intellectual Freedom Achievement Award which had been annually awarded "to the most innovative and effective intellectual freedom project covering a state or region."

=== AASL Intellectual Freedom Award ===
Since 1982, the American Association of School Librarians (AASL), a division of the ALA, annually awards the Intellectual Freedom Award. Consisting of a $2000 prize to the recipient and a $1000 prize to the school library program of the recipient's choice, the award honors a school librarian "for upholding the principles of intellectual freedom as set forth by the American Association of School Librarians and the American Library Association."

=== Gordon M. Conable Award ===
Since 2007, the Public Library Association (PLA), a division of the ALA, annually awards the Gordon M. Conable Award. Consisting of a $1500 prize and commemorative plaque, the award "honors a public library staff member, a library trustee, or a public library that has demonstrated a commitment to intellectual freedom and the Library Bill of Rights."

== Intellectual freedom under authoritarian rule ==
Intellectual freedom is often suppressed under authoritarian rule and such governments often claim to have nominal intellectual freedom, although the degree of freedom is a matter of dispute. The former USSR, for example, claimed to provide intellectual freedom, but some analysts in the West have stated that the degree of intellectual freedom was nominal at best.

== Intellectual freedom in democratic countries during times of crises ==
During times of crises there is often debate within democratic countries as to the balance between national security, a successful conclusion to the crises and the maintenance of democratic civil liberties. This debate often takes the form of to what extent a democratic government can curtail civil liberties in the interest of successfully ending the crises.

=== Canada ===
Such a debate existed in Canada during the Second World War. Since the First World War the War Measures Act had existed as legislation in Canada to allow the government to operate with greater powers during times of national crises, such as in wartime. During the Second World War the federal Liberal government of Prime Minister William Lyon Mackenzie King enacted the measure by Order-in-Council. The War Measures Act and with it the Defence of Canada Regulations were passed by the federal government in early September 1939. With their implementation civil liberties, especially the intellectual freedom of political dissenters, were curtailed. As well, in Quebec the Union Nationale government of Premier Maurice Duplessis enacted “An Act Respecting Communist Propaganda”, which came to be known as the Padlock Act. It gave Premier Duplesis, as Attorney General of Quebec, the power to close (hence padlock) any premises used for the purposes of “propagating Communism or Bolshevism.” The Act was criticized by Eugene Forsey, for example, as being far too broad in definition and that it gave the Premier the power to suppress any opinions that he wished to. Forsey cited examples of such abuse in the Canadian Forum.

All of these measures were criticized by writers in the Canadian Forum such as Eugene Forsey and Frank R. Scott and by the League for Social Reconstruction in general; a group to which both Forsey and Scott belonged. Indeed, during the Second World War the Canadian Forum printed an anonymous monthly column outlining civil liberties abuses by Canadian authorities.

=== United States ===
In the aftermath of the September 11th attacks issues concerning the suspension or reduction of civil liberties in the name of national security have arisen. Legislation such as the Homeland Security Act (HSA) of 2002 and the USA PATRIOT Act (often shortened to the Patriot Act) of 2001 encroach upon intellectual freedom rights to privacy and freedom of information to enhance domestic security from potential terrorist threats and acts.

The Patriot Act in particular has come under fire from numerous intellectual freedom organizations. The Electronic Privacy Information Center (EPIC) has criticized the Patriot Act as unconstitutional, especially when "the private communications of law-abiding American citizens might be intercepted incidentally," Additionally, the Electronic Frontier Foundation (EFF) maintains that the lower standard applied to wiretaps "gives the FBI a 'blank check' to violate the communications privacy of countless innocent Americans". The American Library Association (ALA) has partnered with American libraries in opposition to a provision in Section 215 which allows the FBI to apply for an order to produce materials that assist in an investigation undertaken to protect against international terrorism or clandestine intelligence activities. The "tangible things" that can be targeted include "books, records, papers, documents, and other items".

== See also ==
- Academic freedom
- Censorship
- Cognitive liberty
- Freedom of thought
- Information wants to be free
- Intellectual diversity
- Political freedom
