= Lester Asheim =

American librarian

- Born: January 22, 1914; Spokane, Washington, US
- Died: July 1, 1997 (aged 83); Chapel Hill, North Carolina, US
- Occupations: Librarian, educator

Lester Eugene Asheim (January 22, 1914 – July 1, 1997) was an American librarian and scholar of library science and film history. He was on the faculty of the University of Chicago Graduate Library School and the University of North Carolina and held positions in the American Library Association (ALA). He was included among the "100 most important leaders we had in the 20th century" by the American Library Association.

== Early life ==
Lester Asheim was born on January 22, 1914, in Spokane, Washington. His family moved to Seattle. He attended the University of Washington. While there he earned two undergraduate degrees, one in English in 1936, and another in Librarianship in 1937. He also earned his master's degree in American literature in 1941 from the same institution.

When the United States entered World War II, Asheim joined the Army Signal Corps for three years. After his tour of duty, Asheim attended the University of Chicago Graduate Library School

He earned the Ph.D. in librarianship from the university's graduate program in 1949. His dissertation, From Book to Film, was the subject of an analysis in Hollywood Quarterly.

== Academic life ==
Asheim's first faculty position was at the University of Chicago, which started in 1948 while he was still attaining his Ph.D. He became dean in 1952 and held the position until he left the school in 1961.

From 1961 until 1971 he held two different positions with the American Library Association (ALA). His first was director of International relations until 1966, then he moved on to be the director of the ALA's office for library education.

Asheim left the ALA in 1971 to return to the University of Chicago as a faculty member.

In 1975 he accepted a position as a faculty member at the University of North Carolina. He remained at the School of Information and Library Science until his retirement in 1984. His papers are archived at the Southern Historical Collection of the Louis Round Wilson Library on the University of North Carolina at the Chapel Hill campus

== Death and afterward ==
Asheim died on July 1, 1997, in Chapel Hill, North Carolina. The Library and Science department at the University Of North Carolina has created a scholarship fund in his name.

== Contribution to library science ==
Asheim made some of the most important contributions in Library science through his work on censorship in the library atmosphere. Asheim was an active librarian in a time of great growth in the library science community. His most famous article entitled "Not Censorship, But Selection" has become as ingrained to library science as the five laws of Ranganathan.

Asheim's article articulated the difference between censorship and selection in several parts that address each of the problems that were associated with collection continuation. He presents and advocates several rules that librarians should follow in deciding what materials to include and exclude in their libraries' collections.

Asheim's article is still cited by library science community decades later when dealing with the problems of cyber materials. The article "Lester Asheim in Cyberspace: A tribute to Sound reasoning" by June Pinnell-Stephens takes Asheim's arguments and applies them to the cyber age.

== Published works ==
- Asheim, Lester, ed. A Forum on the Public Library Inquiry : The Conference at the University of Chicago Graduate Library School August 8–13.1949. Oxford University Press: Columbia University Press; 1950.
- Berelson, Bernard; Lester Asheim (1949). The Library's Public: A Report of the Public Library Inquiry. New York: Columbia University Press. doi:10.7312/bere93730.
- Asheim, Lester (September 1953). "Not Censorship But Selection". Wilson Library Bulletin. 28: 63–67.
- Asheim, Lester, ed. (1955). The Future of the Book: Implications of the Newer Developments in Communication. University of Chicago Studies in Library Science. Chicago: University of Chicago Graduate Library School. pp. v+105.
- Asheim, Lester E. "Training needs of librarians doing adult education work." The Library Quarterly. 1956:153-154.
- Asheim L. The Humanities and the Library: Problems in the Interpretation Evaluation and Use of Library Materials. Chicago: American Library Association; 1957.
- Asheim, Lester (1957). Great Novels and Plays as Films. New York: U.S. Information Service.
- Asheim, Lester, ed. (1961). Persistent Issues in American Librarianship: Papers Presented before the Twenty-Fifth Annual Conference of the Graduate Library School of the University of Chicago. University of Chicago studies in library science. Chicago: University of Chicago, Graduate Library School. pp. v, 114. ISBN 0-226-02960-3.
- Stanford University. Institute for Communication Research; Asheim, Lester (1962). Educational Television: The Next Ten Years; a Report and Summary of Major Studies on the Problems and Potential of Educational Television. Washington: U.S. Department of Health, Education, and Welfare, Office of Education. pp. xi, 375.
- Asheim, Lester (1966). Librarianship in the Developing Countries. Phineas L. Windsor lectures in librarianship. Urbana: University of Illinois Press. pp. vii, 95. LCCN 66029774.
- Asheim, Lester; Fenwick, Sara I., eds. (1975). Differentiating the Media: Proceedings of the Thirty-Seventh Annual Conference of the Graduate Library School, August 5–6, 1974. University of Chicago studies in library science. Chicago: University of Chicago Press. p. 74. ISBN 0-226-02964-6. LCCN 74028809.
- Asheim, L. E. (1983). Selection and censorship: a reappraisal. Wilson Library Bulletin, 58, 180–184.
- Asheim, Lester (1987). The Reader-Viewer-Listener: An Essay in Communication. Washington: Library of Congress. p. 33. ISBN 0-8444-0550-7.
- Asheim, Lester; et al. (November 15, 1993). "Library Journal Classics". Library Journal. 118 (19): S1–3, 6–8, 10, 12. ISSN 0363-0277.

== Awards ==
Professor Asheim received many awards during his lifetime. These included:

- University of Washington Distinguished Alumni Award in 1966.
- Illinois Library Association Intellectual Freedom Award in 1966.
- Beta Phi Mu Award for Distinguished Service to Education for Librarianship in 1973.
- The Joseph W. Lippincott Award from the American Library Association in 1976.
- American Library Association Honorary Membership in 1984.
- ALISE (Association for Library and Information Science Education) Award for Professional contribution to Library and Information Science Education in 1992.

In 1979, in honor of Asheim's 65th birthday, the festschrift, a collection of articles written in his honor, As Much to Learn as to Teach, was published.
