= Adele Fasick =

American novelist and academic (1930–2025)

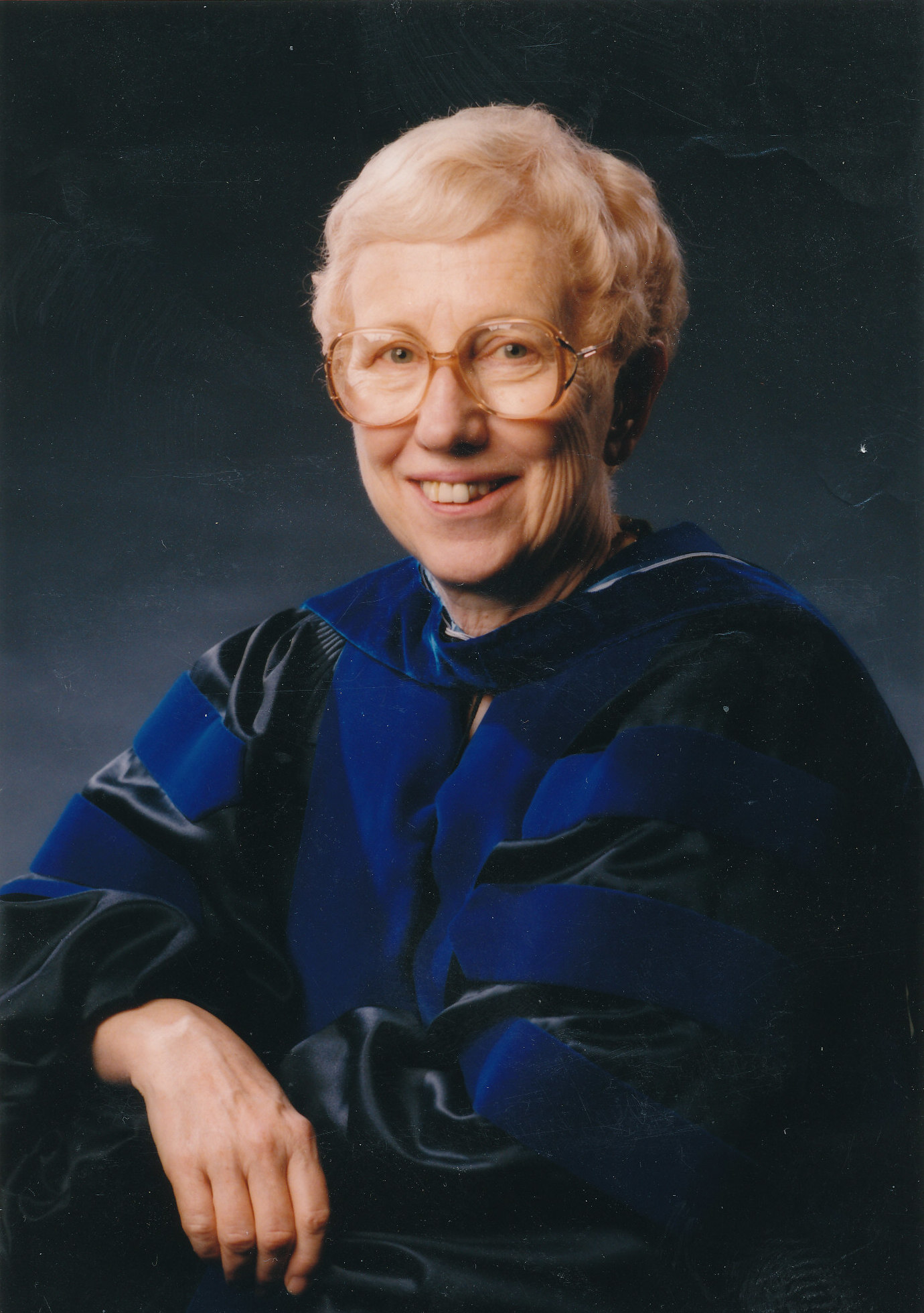
- Born: March 18, 1930; New York City, New York, U.S.
- Died: May 26, 2025 (aged 95)
- Education: Cornell University (1951); Columbia University (1954, 1956); Case Western Reserve University (1970)
- Occupations: author; academic; librarian
- Children: 3

Adele Fasick (née Mongan; March 18, 1930 – May 26, 2025) was an American author, scholar, professor emerita and dean of library and information science for the Faculty of Information Studies, University of Toronto.

== Early life ==
Adele Mongan was born in New York City on March 18, 1930, to Florence (née Geary) and Stephen Mongan. She attended Cornell University, receiving her Bachelor of Arts in 1951. After graduation, she and her sister went on a student trip to post-war Europe. She then went on to receive a Master of Arts (1954) and Master of Library Science (1956) from Columbia University. Accessed March 13, 2024.

== Career ==
Fasick began working at the New York Public Library in 1955 as a children's librarian, moving to Long Island University the following year. In 1958, she quit her job to become a housewife; she had three daughters with her husband, whom she later divorced. During this period she also pursued a doctorate in library science from Case Western Reserve University; her dissertation was titled A comparative linguistic analysis of books and television for children.

In 1970 she was hired as an assistant professor in the graduate school at Rosary College. The following year she moved to the Faculty of Library and Information Science at the University of Toronto, becoming dean of the faculty in 1990 and remaining in that position until 1995. In 1996 she moved to San Francisco, teaching as an adjunct professor at San Jose State University.

She chaired the Children's Library Section of the International Federation of Library Associations and Institutions. She is a past president of the Association for Library and Information Science Education for 1992/93. She also volunteered with the League of Women Voters of San Francisco and assisted in the preparation of the Guide to California Government.

Fasick died on May 26, 2025, at the age of 95.

== Writing ==
Fasick is the author of the Charlotte Edgerton historical mystery series, set in the 1840s. A Death in Utopia (2014) considers the death of a minister in Brook Farm, Massachusetts. Death Visits a Bawdy House (2015) features the brothels of New York City. Death Calls at the Palace centers on activities in the court of Queen Victoria and the death of an Irishwoman in London. Death Enters the Convent (2018) set in Florence, Italy during the year of European revolutions (1849) unravels a tale of deceit and intrigue. She also wrote a picture book for children, The Beauty Who Would Not Spin (Scholastic, 1988), in which she hoped "that her young readers will take from her theme the message that the world offers many options to women and that their choices should be guided by the natural talents and instincts rather than by the expectations of others".

Her text, Managing Children's Services in Libraries, in its 4th edition (2015) supports librarians who work with youth. Her other non-fiction works include:

- Margaret Fuller: An Uncommon Woman, S.F. MonganBooks, 2012.
- From Boardbook to Facebook: Children's Services in an Interactive Age. Libraries Unlimited, 2011.
- Lands of Pleasure: Essays on Lillian H. Smith and the Development of Children's Libraries (Editor with R. Osler and M. Johnston). Metuchen, New Jersey: Scarecrow Press, 1990.
- ChildView: Evaluating and Reviewing Materials for Children. (with Claire England) Littleton, Colorado: Libraries Unlimited, 1987.
- What Should Libraries Do for Children? Parents, Librarians and Teachers View Materials and Services in the South Central Regional Library System (Ontario). Hamilton: South Central Regional Library System, 1978.
- Children Using Media; Reading and Viewing Preferences Among the Users and Nonusers of the Regina Public Library. Centre for Research in Librarianship, Faculty of Library Science, University of Toronto, 1977.

She operated a blog called Teacups and Tyrants.
