= Ken Haycock =

Canadian educator and librarian

Kenneth Roy Haycock D.Litt. (Hon.), MBA, Ed.D.
- Born: February 15, 1948 (age 78); Hamilton, Ontario, Canada
- Education: University of Western Ontario; University of Ottawa; University of Michigan; Brigham Young University; Royal Roads University
- Occupations: Educator, librarian, consultant
- Employer(s): San José State University (professor emeritus); University of British Columbia (professor emeritus); University of Southern California; Dominican University; Queensland University of Technology
- Website: www.about.me/kenhaycock

Kenneth Roy Haycock (born February 15, 1948) is a Canadian educator, librarian, and consultant in the field of library and information science. He is professor emeritus at San José State University and the University of British Columbia, and has held leadership roles at institutions in Canada, the United States, and Australia. Haycock is known for his contributions to education for library professionals, teacher-librarianship, board governance and leadership development in the nonprofit sector.

== Early life and education ==
Haycock was born in Hamilton, Ontario, to Bruce Frederick Travis Haycock and Doris Marion Page Downham.

He attended public schools in Hamilton and London, Ontario, and earned a Bachelor of Arts in Political Science (1968) and a Diploma in Education (1969) from the University of Western Ontario. He received a Master of Education in Curriculum and Foundations from the University of Ottawa (1973), a Master of Arts in Library Science from the University of Michigan (1974), Doctor of Education in Administration and Leadership from Brigham Young University (1991), and a Master of Business Administration in Human Resources Management from Royal Roads University (2004).

== Career ==
Haycock began his professional career as a secondary school teacher and department head in 1969 at Glebe Collegiate Institute and Colonel By Secondary School in Ottawa, Ontario. In 1972, he transitioned to a role as consultant (K-12) with the Wellington County Board of Education in Guelph, Ontario. He moved to Vancouver, British Columbia in 1976 to serve as coordinator of library services for the Vancouver School Board, where he oversaw school and school/public libraries. He introduced the terms teacher-librarian and Cooperative Program Planning and Teaching during this period.

In 1984, Haycock joined the Vancouver School Board's senior management, overseeing curriculum and staff development. He returned to academic librarianship in 1992 as director and professor at the University of British Columbia's School of Library, Archival and Information Studies, where he supported the development of several graduate programs, including a PhD program and an MA in Children's Literature.

In 2005, Haycock became the director of the School of Library and Information Science at San Jose State University, where he led the transition to a fully online model with a large international student base. He introduced an Executive MLIS program, a Master of Archives and Records Administration, and an international PhD program. In 2010, Haycock was appointed the Follett Chair in Library and Information Science at Dominican University. In 2012, he was appointed research professor in the Marshall School of Business at the University of Southern California, where he developed a Master of Management in Library and Information Science. He also held an adjunct position at Queensland University of Technology.

In 1991, he founded the consultancy Ken Haycock & Associates, offering governance and leadership services to libraries, nonprofit organizations, and educational institutions.

He has served in leadership roles with several professional organizations, including as president of the Canadian School Library Association (1974–1975), the Canadian Library Association (1977–1978), the American Association of School Librarians (1997–1998), and the Association for Library and Information Science Education. Haycock was a member of the executive board of the American Library Association (1996–2000) and chaired its Committee on Accreditation in 2011–2012.

In public service, Haycock was chair of the West Vancouver School Board (1994–1997) and was elected municipal councillor in the District of West Vancouver (1999–2002). He served as chancellor of Capilano University from 2014 to 2015.

== Selected publications ==
- Haycock, K. (Ed.). Foundations for Effective School Library Media Programs. Englewood, CO: Libraries Unlimited, 1999.
- Haycock, K., & Sheldon, B. (Eds.). The Portable MLIS: Insights from the Experts. Santa Barbara, CA: Libraries Unlimited, 2008. (Second edition with M. Romaniuk, 2017).
- Haycock, K. (2003). The Crisis in Canada's School Libraries: The Case for Reform and Re-investment. Toronto: Association of Canadian Publishers.
- Haycock, K. (2006). “Dual Use Libraries: Guidelines for Success.” Library Trends, 54(4), 488–500.
- Haycock, K. (2010). “Predicting Sustainability for Programs in Library and Information Science: Factors Influencing Continuance and Discontinuance.” Journal of Education for Library and Information Science, 51(3), 130–141.
- Haycock, K. (2011). “Connecting British Columbia School Libraries and Student Achievement: A Comparison of Higher and Lower Performing Schools with Similar Overall Funding.” School Libraries Worldwide, 17(1), 37–50.
- Haycock, K., & Romaniuk, M.-J. (2011). “Designing and Evaluating Library Leadership Programs: Improving Performance and Effectiveness.” Australian Library Journal, 60(1), 29–40.
- Haycock, K., & Stenstrom, C. (2014). “The Role of Interpersonal Influence in Budget Decision Making: The Canadian Public Library Experience.” Administration & Society, 47(8), 983–1014.
- Haycock, K. (2014). “Reviewing the Research and Evidence: Towards Best Practices for Advocacy for Library Support and Funding.” Chicago: American Library Association.
- Haycock, K. (2025). “Advocacy and Influence: What We Know After Fifty Years of Training and Research: An Interview with Ken Haycock.” In R. Pun, S. Durney, & T. Anantachai (Eds.), Legislative Advocacy and Public Policy for Academic Research Library Workers (pp. 155–164). Chicago: Association of College and Research Libraries.

== Editor ==
Haycock served as editor for several publications in the field, including Emergency Librarian. He was the founding editor of Teacher Librarian: The Journal for School Library Professionals and ResourceLinks: Connecting Classrooms, Libraries, and Canadian Learning Resources.
