= Rudolph Hjalmar Gjelsness =

American librarian and literary translator (1894–1968)

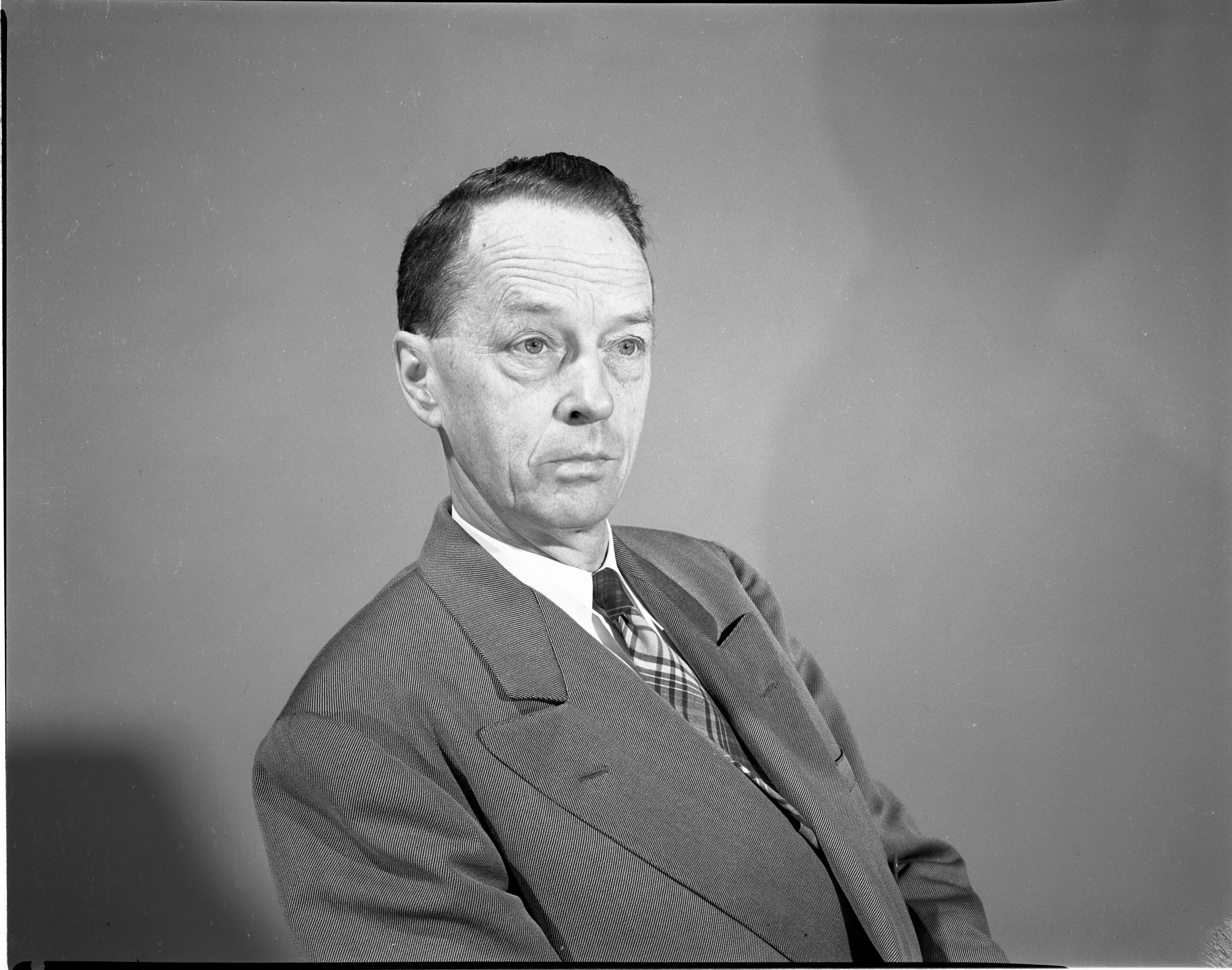
- Born: October 18, 1894
- Died: August 16, 1968 (aged 73)
- Alma mater: University of Illinois Urbana-Champaign; University of North Dakota
- Occupation: Librarian, translator
- Employer: American Expeditionary Forces; University of California, Berkeley; University of Michigan; University of Oregon; University of Oslo

Rudolph Hjalmar Gjelsness (October 18, 1894 – August 16, 1968) was a prominent American librarian and literary translator who served as Dean of the University of Michigan's Library Science Department from 1940 to 1964. He was the first recipient of the Beta Phi Mu Award recognizing distinguished service to education for librarianship.

Additionally, Gjelsness held positions at a variety of public and university libraries, including the New York City Public Library, the University of Arizona, and the University of California-Berkeley, as well as several others both in the United States and abroad. He also contributed articles to numerous scholarly journals within the library field, including Public Libraries, The Library Quarterly, and the Journal of Education for Librarians. In 1999, American Libraries named him one of the "100 Most Important Leaders We Had in the 20th Century."

== Early life and education: 1894–1925 ==
Rudolph Hjalmar Gjelsness was born in the farming community of Reynolds, North Dakota on October 18, 1894. A first-generation American, Gjelsness was raised by his Norwegian immigrant parents Marius and Karoline Gjelsness to speak both the Norwegian and English languages. Gjelsness began his college education at the University of North Dakota and graduated with a degree in zoology and a teacher's certificate in 1916. Following a brief stint as principal of a high school in the small town of Adams, North Dakota, he enrolled in the Library School at the University of Illinois.

Gjelsness postponed his education due to the United States' entry into World War I. Following a year of service in the United States Army Air Service in Western Europe, Gjelsness was discharged to serve as a reference librarian at the American Expeditionary Forces University in Beaune, France.

After his time in Europe, Gjelsness returned to the University of Illinois to finish his education, earning a bachelor's degree in library science in 1920.

This allowed Gjelsness to take a variety of jobs at both public libraries and at major universities. These included positions as head of the Ordering Department at the University of Oregon's library and later as senior bibliographer at the University of California-Berkeley. In 1924, Gjelsness was given an offer to study literature in his parents' homeland by The American-Scandinavian Foundation. Over the course of his year at the University of Oslo, he translated numerous works from Norwegian into English. His experiences were detailed in "A Librarian's Year in Norway," an article he contributed to the July 1925 issue of Public Libraries.

== Professional career: 1925–1964 ==
Upon his return to the United States, Gjelsness took a job in the University of Michigan Library, where he spent four years principally in the cataloging department. In 1929, he left the university and moved to New York City. Here, he divided his time between heading the preparation division of the New York City Public Library and the Library Science department at Columbia University, where he served as a lecturer. While living in New York, Gjelsness married Ruth Weaver. The couple later had two children, Elizabeth and Barent.

Also while in New York, Gjelsness also became active in the American Library Association and served on various high-profile committees within the organization. These included the Committee on Cataloging and Classification, the American Agricultural Libraries Section, and the International Relations Board. He was also the group's treasurer between 1941 and 1947. Among Gjelsness's achievements with the ALA was his work as editor-in-chief revising the standard Anglo-American Cataloging Rules between 1935 and 1941 and the subsequent publication of ALA Catalog Rules: Author and Title Entries in 1941.

After a brief stint back at the University of Michigan, Gjelsness took a job heading the Special Collections Division at the University of Arizona while concurrently lecturing at the University of Illinois and serving as a consultant at Vanderbilt University. In 1937, he again left Arizona to return to the University of Michigan. After serving three years as a professor, he was promoted to Dean of the Library Science Department 1940, a position he held until 1964. Although he taught many courses at the university, his primary interest was in the history of American publishing of both books and periodicals.

He was elected president of the Association for Library and Information Science Education in 1948-1949.

In 1954 he was honored with the inaugural Beta Phi Mu Award by the American Library Association for distinguished service to education for librarianship.

The printer's mark of Aldus Manutius is the insignia of Beta Phi Mu. Gjelsness was the inaugural recipient of the Beta Phi Mu Award

During his tenure as dean, he also began to aid in the establishment and progress of libraries and library science department in foreign countries. Among these were a program he helped set up in Bogota, Colombia, and Mexico City's Benjamin Franklin Library, where he served as director between 1943 and 1944. Gjelsness later returned to Mexico, resulting in the publication of one of his major works, The American Book in Mexico: A Bibliography of Books by Authors of the United States of America Published in Mexico, 1952-55. For this project, Gjelsness compiled and sorted a list of books written by Americans that were published and sold in Mexico, as well as wrote an introduction regarding publishing and readership in Mexico. In October 1962, he went to Iraq to act as consultant to the President of the University of Baghdad, as part of a Ford Foundation project to develop the University’s libraries. However, he never managed to establish a relationship with the President, and seems to have done little other than organise some training on cataloguing and classification for 5 of the Central Library’s staff over a 2-month period in 1963. His appointment was for 2 years, but he had taken sabbatical leave only for a year, and his departure surprised the Foundation.

Gjelsness also contributed many articles to various scholarly journals on a variety of topics regarding libraries and the role of library schools. During his tenure as dean at the University of Michigan, Gjelsness observed in one such article originally published in 1945 that library science departments were improving but more still needed to be done to attract better candidates to careers in the field. He recommended increases in salaries to remedy the situation, putting the minimum figure at three thousand dollars per year.

== Retirement and death: 1964–1968 ==
In 1964, Gjelsness retired from the University of Michigan. Still, he continued to serve the library profession, including a return to the University of Arizona's Special Collections Division. His final appointment sent him to San Juan, Puerto Rico where he was hired to assist in the foundation of the University of Puerto Rico's Library Science Department. However, the day after his arrival, Gjelsness was killed in a hit-and-run traffic accident on August 16, 1968.

== Personal papers ==
A collection of Gjelsness' personal papers, including some material written by members of his family, is housed at the Bentley Historical Library at the University of Michigan.
