= Sarah Bogle =

American librarian

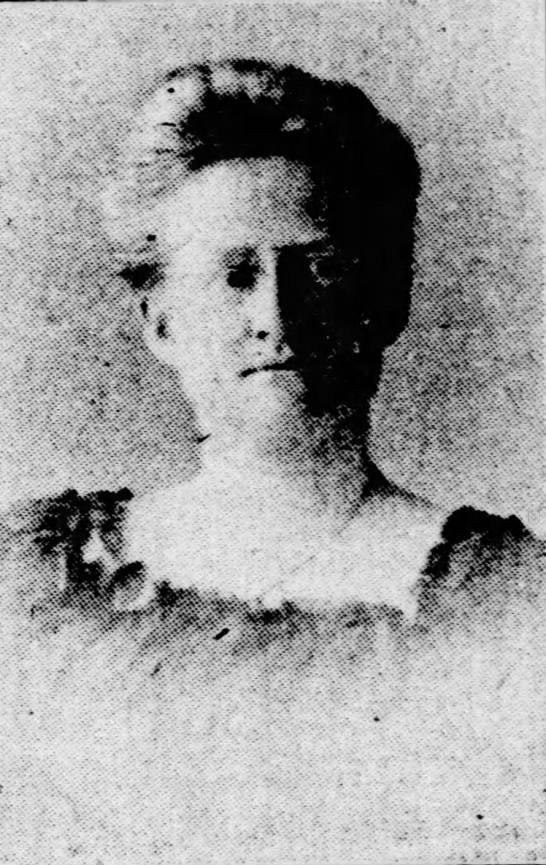
- Born: November 17, 1870; Milton
- Died: January 11, 1932 (aged 61)
- Resting place: Milton
- Alma mater: University of Chicago; Drexel University
- Occupation: Librarian

Sarah Comly Norris Bogle (November 17, 1870 – January 11, 1932) was an American librarian most noted for her influence in establishing education for librarianship. Her achievements lay in creating a system which enabled the American Library Association to accredit existing library school programs. She is considered one of the most influential librarians in the field of library science due to her efforts in implementing a universal curriculum in order to teach students the fundamentals of library science.

== Early life ==
Sarah Bogle was born in 1870, at a time when most women stayed home and attended to domestic affairs. When she was fourteen she began two years of private tutelage at an academy for women. Afterwards she traveled from place to place while attending such colleges as the University of Chicago in Illinois. Her career as a librarian began in 1903 at the age of 32 when she graduated from the Drexel Institute in Philadelphia. After graduation she worked in the academic library at a small college before making the transition to a public librarian for the East Liberty Branch of the Pittsburg library system. Owing to a series of unfortunate circumstances that accumulated with the resignation of the Head of the Children's Department, Bogle stepped into the role of overseeing the branch of the children's library as well as the training school associated with the children's department. In 1911 Bogle became principal of the training school for Children's Librarians (which in 1916 became the Carnegie Library School) and established a core curriculum of required subjects and electives for specialized areas.

== Assistant secretary ==
In 1920 Sarah Bogle accepted a position as assistant secretary for the American Library Association. She worked closely with other colleagues to establish a training school in Paris to educate future librarians. Bogle's time as library school director at the Carnegie Library School helped her prepare for the international scope of this project. Her colleagues often noted Bogle's skill in dealing with people, and her knack for acquiring money through grants and working closely with foundation directors.

== Work overseas ==
Her ability to acquire money through grants led Bogle to develop and implement a training program in 1923 in France while she was assistant secretary to the ALA. She organized the effort to train French students by bringing in American librarians to teach classes in cataloging, references, and administration work. According to Mary Niles Maack, Sarah Bogle was adamant that the French could contribute as much to the new client-centered system of librarianship that was being trained in the schools as American teachers could contribute to the library schools in France. As Sarah Bogle stated in an article in the Library Occurrent concerning the set-up of an American-trained library school in France; "With the richness of her (France) book collections, with the depth of her culture, with the excellence of her bibliographic work she can contribute when proper avenues of interchange are established quite as much to this newer country as the newer country can give to her in the way of library technique, means of accessibility to books and related material, and a progressiveness and outlook which are sadly needed at this time" The Paris Library School was located in the building of the American Library in Paris from 1924 to 1929.

== Work in the South ==
Bogle was notably supportive of minority groups in the United States. With the help of Tommie Dora Parker, Bogle sought to provide a library training program to blacks in the south. One outcome of her efforts was the funding of the Hampton Institute Library.

== Influencing library training ==
As assistant secretary of the American Library Association, Bogle saw her role as a means to harness the lackadaisical efforts of training librarians. She understood that the work of the librarian was constantly changing. In her article, "Trends and Tendencies in Education for Librarianship", she acknowledge that, "it is difficult to try to discern or deduce future trends of library training from a knowledge gained through the study of educational progress in vocations long since self-organized and accepted as professions" Still, she believed it was necessary to lay down a foundation of core curriculum that would be necessary in the field of librarianship. The establishment of the Board of Education for Librarianship in 1924 was a committee made up of those who wanted to lay down a minimum standard that had to be achieved in order to be fully endorsed by the ALA for library schools. The outlined the organization, administration, instructional staff, financial status, and equipment that each school must possess in order to meet the ALA standard to be considered an accredited library program.

== Legacy ==
Bogle died of cancer on January 11, 1932, at the age of 62. In recognition of Sarah Bogle's international activities, her friends wished the Bogle fund's income to support an international-study fellowship which would enable the U.S. and Canadian librarians to study abroad and non-Canadian international librarians to study in the United States or Canada.

In 1982, the ALA executive board directed that the interest from the Sarah C.N. Bogle Memorial fund be used for annual grants to enable a member or members of the American Library Association to attend an international conference for the first time, and signal its original intent by changing its name from the Sarah C.N. Bogle Memorial Fund to the Bogle International Library Travel Fund.
