= Leigh S. Estabrook =

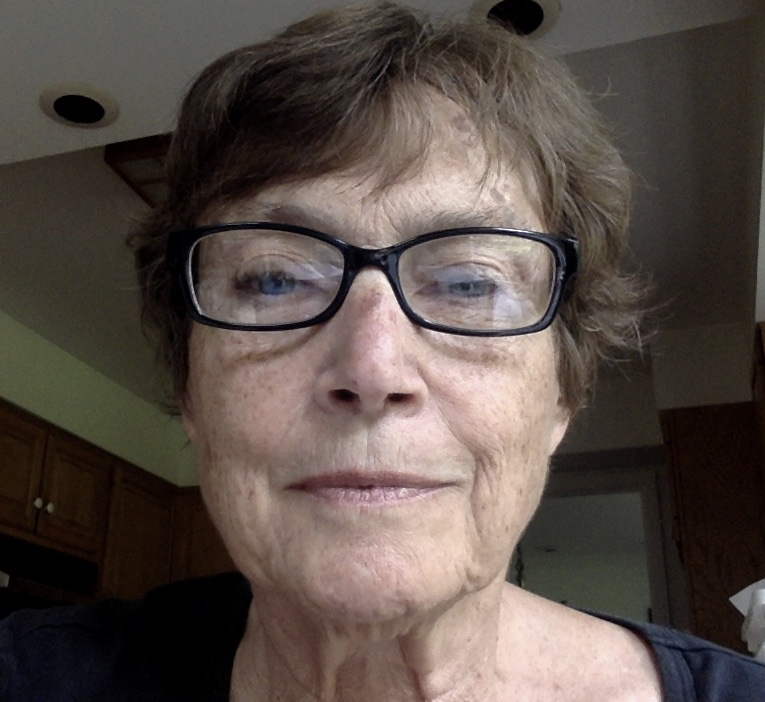
- Born: May 1, 1942 (age 84)
- Education: Boston University PhD
- Occupations: University professor and dean

Leigh Stewart Estabrook (born May 1, 1942) is Dean Emerita at the University of Illinois School of Information Sciences. She is a sociologist and library and information science professor, noted for her innovations in research, including building a diverse faculty actively engaged in research ranging from historical work to digital library initiative projects. She was president of the Association for Library and Information Science Education in 1988–1989.

== Education and career ==
Estabrook holds the AB, Northwestern University, 1964. Master of Science, Simmons College, 1969 and PhD Boston University, 1980.

In 1985 she was appointed professor and dean at the University of Illinois School of Information Sciences with dual appointments in library and information science and the department of Sociology.

Among Estabrook's accomplishments during her time as dean was establishment of LEEP Online Education LEEP, relocating the School's facilities to property purchased from the Acacia fraternity, and bringing The Bulletin of the Center for Children's Books to the program.

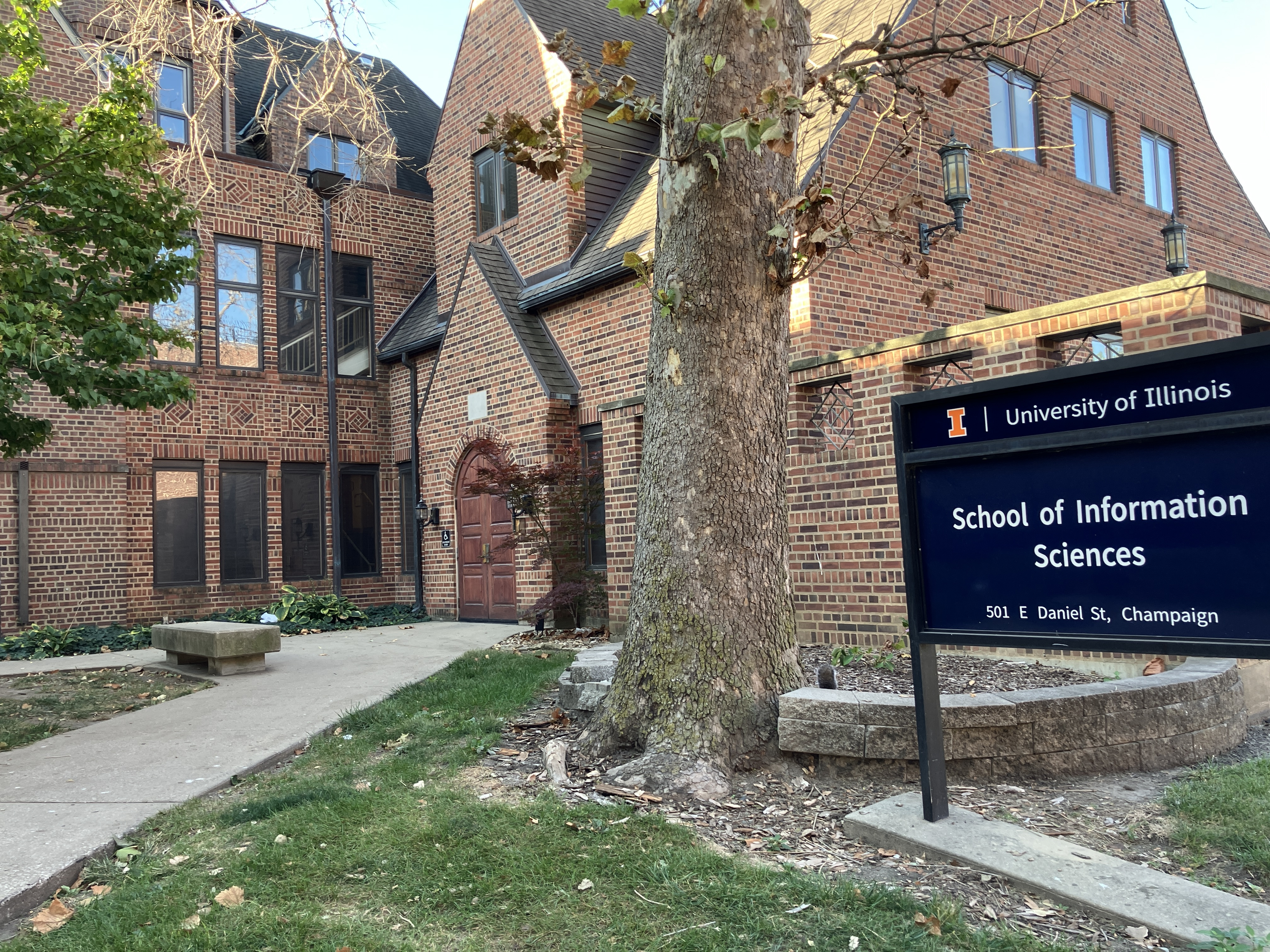
University of Illinois School of Information Sciences.

After her term as dean Estabrook continued as director of the Library Research Center. The Center conducted dozens of studies, including a series on the impact of the USAPATRIOT Act on libraries.

Estabrook was a Scholar in Residence at the Chicago Public Library in 2002.

She is a fellow of the A.K. Rice Institute, president, and consultant to AKRI conferences.

== Personal life ==
She married Carl Galliher Estabrook and they had five children: John, Daniel, Susan, Anne and Helen. Carl Estabrook died in 2026.

== Selected publications ==
- (2017)."Library and Information Science" with Miriam E. Sweeney in the Encyclopedia of Library and Information Sciences.4th Edition.
- (2008). Estabrook, Leigh S., and F. W. Lancaster. 2008. "Reflections: An Interview with F. W. Lancaster." Library Trends 56 (4): 968–74.
- (2007). Varvel, Virgil E., Rae-Anne Montague, and Leigh S. Estabrook. 2007. "Policy and E-Learning." In The SAGE Handbook of E-Learning Research: 269–285.
- (2007) "What Chief Academic Officers Want from Their Libraries: Findings from interviews with Provosts and Chief Academic Officers." Library Research Center, University of Illinois at Urbana-Champaign.
- (2007). Estabrook, Leigh S., G. Evans Witt, and Harrison Rainie, Information Searches That Solve Problems: How People Use the Internet, Libraries, and Government Agencies When They Need Help. [Washington, DC], Urbana-Champaign: Pew Internet & American Life Project; Graduate School of Library and Information Science, University of Illinois at Urbana-Champaign.
- (2005). Estabrook, Leigh S. 2005. "Crying Wolf: A Response." Journal of Education for Library and Information Science 46 (4): 299–303.
- (2003). Bridges, Karl, and Leigh S. Estabrook. Expectations of Librarians in the 21st Century. Westport: Greenwood Press.
- (2003). Estabrook, Leigh S. 2003. The Book as the Gold Standard for Tenure and Promotion in the Humanistic Disciplines. [Champaign, Ill.]: Committee on Institutional Cooperation.
- (2001). Searing, Susan E, and Leigh S Estabrook. 2001. "The Future of Scientific Publishing on the Web: Insights from Focus Groups of Chemists." portal – Libraries and the Academy 1 (1): 77–96.
- (2000). Estabrook, Leigh S., and Ed Lakner. 2000. "Managing Internet Access: Results of a National Survey." American Libraries 31 (8): 60–62.
- (1997). Estabrook, Leigh S. "The Visible College/LEEP3 at the University of Illinois." Journal of Education for Library and Information Science 38 (Spring): 157–160.
- (1997). Estabrook, Leigh S. 1997. "Polarized Perceptions." Library Journal 122 (2): 46–48.
- (1995). Estabrook, Leigh S. Leadership as Legacy: Transformation at the Turn of the Millenium: Proceedings of the Twelfth Scientific Meeting of the A.K. Rice Institute. A.K. Rice Institute Washington-Baltimore Center, and University of Maryland at College Park Center for Political Leadership and Participation. 1997.
- (1996). Estabrook, Leigh S. "Sacred Trust or Competitive Opportunity: Using Patron Records." Library Journal 121 (2): 48–49.
- (1992). Estabrook, Leigh S., and Chris Horak."Public vs. professional opinion on libraries: the great divide ?"Library Journal 117:52-55.
- (1992). Estabrook, Leigh S. Applying Research to Practice: How to Use Data Collection and Research to Improve Library Management Decision Making. Allerton Park Institute, Urbana-Champaign, Ill.: University of Illinois, Graduate School of Library and Information Science.
- (1986). Estabrook, Leigh S. 1986. "Librarianship and Information Resources Management: Some Questions and Contradictions." Journal of Education for Library and Information Science 27 (1): 3–11.
- (1986). Estabrook, Leigh S. Libraries in the Age of Automation: A Reader for the Professional Librarian. White Plains, NY: Knowledge Industry Publications.
- (1986). Estabrook, Leigh S. "Librarianship and Information Resources Management: Some Questions and Contradictions." Journal of Education for Library and Information Science 27 (1): 3–11.
- (1983). Heim, Kathleen M. and Leigh S. Estabrook. Career Profiles and Sex Discrimination in the Library Profession. Chicago: American Library Association.
- (1980). Estabrook, Leigh S., and Kathleen M. Heim. "A Profile of ALA Personal Members." American Libraries 11 (11): 654–59.
- (1979) Estabrook, Leigh S. "Emerging Trends in Community Library Services." Library Trends.
- (1977). Estabrook, Leigh S. Libraries in Post-Industrial Society. Phoenix, AZ: Oryx Press.
