= LeRoy C. Merritt =

LeRoy Charles Merritt (September 10, 1912 – May 22, 1970) was an American librarian, library educator, editor, and one of the profession’s leading advocates against censorship. He is remembered as a vigorous defender of intellectual freedom and as the namesake of the LeRoy C. Merritt Humanitarian Fund.

== Early life and education ==
Merritt was born in Milwaukee, Wisconsin, on September 10, 1912. He began working in the Milwaukee Public Library while attending University of Wisconsin Extension classes and continued weekend and summer work there while studying at the University of Wisconsin–Madison.

In 1935, he earned a B.A. and a diploma (certificate) in librarianship. He received a Ph.D. in librarianship from the University of Chicago Graduate Library School in 1942. His dissertation, published in 1943, was The United States Government as Publisher, which examined federal government publishing.

== Career ==
During World War II, Merritt served two years in the Armed Forces. Near the end of the European campaign, he worked on a Special Services project in Paris supplying books and magazines to troops at the front.

From 1946 to 1966, he was on the faculty of the University of California, Berkeley School of Librarianship, serving as vice-chairman (1954–1960) and acting dean (until 1962).

In 1966, he became the first dean of the newly established School of Librarianship at the University of Oregon in Eugene. Under his leadership, the school achieved American Library Association (ALA) accreditation in 1968.

At the time of his death, he was president-elect of the American Library Association Library Education Division and had previously served as president of the Association of American Library Schools in 1966-1967.

== Intellectual freedom work ==
Merritt was a longtime opponent of censorship. He chaired the California Library Association Intellectual Freedom Committee.

He served on the ALA Intellectual Freedom Committee (IFC) from 1959 to 1965. During his IFC service, the committee confronted segregation in libraries, gaps in the Library Bill of Rights, and broader access issues.

Merritt was editor of the ALA Newsletter on Intellectual Freedom from 1962- 1970 and compiled the 1952–1962 index to the newsletter.

== Death ==
Merritt died in 1970 in Eugene, Oregon.

== Awards and honors ==
He received the first Robert B. Downs Intellectual Freedom Award from the University of Illinois Graduate School of Library Science in 1969. He donated the honorarium to the newly formed Freedom to Read Foundation, becoming its first benefactor.

== Selected publications ==
- Merritt, LeRoy C. (1943). The United States Government as Publisher. University of Chicago Studies in Library Science. Chicago: University of Chicago Press. pp. xv, 179. LCCN a43001562.
- Burchard, John E.; David, Charles W.; Boyd, Julian P., eds. (1949). Planning the University Library Building: A Summary of Discussions by Librarians, Architects, and Engineers. with the assistance of LeRoy C. Merritt. Princeton, N.J.: Princeton University Press.
- Merritt, LeRoy C. (April 1950). "Government Publications for the Citizen". The Library Quarterly. 20 (2): 139–143.
- 1962–1970. Editor, Newsletter on Intellectual Freedom (ALA Intellectual Freedom Committee). Bi-monthly compilation of censorship incidents, legal developments, and professional commentary.
- Merritt, LeRoy C. (Summer 1970). "Informing the Profession about Intellectual Freedom". Library Trends. 19 (1). Graduate School of Library and Information Science, University of Illinois at Urbana-Champaign: 67–83. ISSN 0024-2594. hdl:2142/6527.
- Merritt, LeRoy C. (1970). Book Selection and Intellectual Freedom. New York: H. W. Wilson. p. 100. ISBN 0-8242-0420-4. LCCN 79116998.
