= Elizabeth Futas =

American librarian (1944-1995)

- Born: May 8, 1944
- Died: February 6, 1995 (aged 50); Philadelphia, Pennsylvania
- Education: Brooklyn College; University of Minnesota; Rutgers University-New Brunswick
- Occupation: Librarian

Elizabeth Dorothy Futas (May 8, 1944–February 6, 1995) was the head of the University of Rhode Island, Graduate School of Library and Information Science from 1986–1995. Earlier in her career, she worked as a cataloger for the Ford Foundation in New York and as a reference librarian at Queens College. She also held faculty positions at Rutgers University-New Brunswick, Emory University and the University of Washington in Seattle, among other institutions. Her text on collection development is widely regarded.

== Legacy ==
Futas is best known for her collections development polices and procedures. The American Library Association offers an annual award to librarians in Futas' name titled Futas Catalyst for Change Award.

== Works ==
- Collection Development Policies and Procedures. (1995) Oryx Press, ISBN 0897747976
- Developing public library collections, policies, and procedures : a how-to-do-it manual for small and medium-sized public libraries. Neal-Shuman (1991) ISBN 1555700608
- Library Acquisition Policies and Procedures. (1984) Oryx Press, ISBN 0897740246
- The Library Forms Illustrated Handbook. (1984) Neal-Schuman, ISBN 0918212693
- Dissertation: Communication and information patterns in the emerging, interdisciplinary area of women's studies. Rutgers University (1980)
