= Mortenson Center for International Library Programs =

Academic program at the University of Illinois at Urbana-Champaign in the USA

The Mortenson Center for International Library Programs was created in 1991 with a gift from C. Walter and Gerda B. Mortenson to the University of Illinois at Urbana-Champaign. The Center promotes international peace through library training programs.

The Mortenson Center has worked with several grant agencies, including the Bill & Melinda Gates Foundation, to develop training programs for librarians in developing countries. They have also worked with the Carnegie Corporation and Mellon Foundation to support education efforts in African libraries.

In 17-28 October, 2016 Mortenson Center for International Library Programs organized the "Innovative management methods of libraries" training programs for the librarians in Armenia. The trainings were attended by 100 librarians of public libraries of Armenia, 60 from the regions and communities of Armenia, 40 from the public libraries of Yerevan.
