= Association for Library and Information Science Education =

Association for Library and Information Science Education (ALISE)
- Formation: 1900
- Type: Non-profit; NGO
- Website: www.alise.org

The Association for Library and Information Science Education (ALISE) (pronounced "Ah-lease") promotes education for the information professions internationally through engagement, advocacy and research.

ALISE is a non-profit professional association for faculty, staff, and students in the library and information sciences and allied disciplines.

== History ==
ALISE is the successor organization to the Association of American Library Schools (AALS), which was founded in 1900. AALS replaced the American Library Association (ALA) Roundtable of Library School Instructors (1911–1915) but was not affiliated with the American Library Association until 1953. Organizationally, AALS and ALA had many connections, especially in the first 30 years of AALS's existence.

Donald G. Davis traced the efforts within ALA for the improvement of library education.

== Journal of Education for Library and Information Science (JELIS) ==
Since 1960, ALISE has published the peer-reviewed scholarly publication, Journal of Education for Library and Information Science. JELIS serves as a primary source of research about issues pertinent to library and information science educators and scholars.

== Presidents ==
| Year | President | Affiliation |
|---|---|---|
| 1915-16 | James Ingersoll Wyer | New York State Library School |
| 1916-17 | June R. Donnelly | Simmons College |
| 1917-18 | Sarah Bogle | Carnegie Institute (Pittsburgh) |
| 1918-19 | Alice S. Tyler | Western Reserve University |
| 1919-20 | Frank K. Walter | New York State Library School |
| 1920-21 | Josephine Adams Rathbone | Pratt Institute |
| 1921-22 | Phineas L. Windsor | University of Illinois Urbana-Champaign |
| 1922-23 | Ernest J. Reece | New York Public Library |
| 1923-24 | Harriet P. Sawyer | St. Louis Public Library |
| 1924-25 | Susie Lee Crumley | Carnegie Library of Atlanta |
| 1925-26 | William E. Henry | University of Washington |
| 1926-27 | Phineas L. Windsor | University of Illinois Urbana-Champaign |
| 1927-28 | Josephine Adams Rathbone | Pratt Institute |
| 1928-29 | June R. Donnelly | Simmons College |
| 1929-30 | Charles C. Williamson | Columbia University School of Library Service |
| 1930-31 | Charles C. Williamson | Columbia University |
| 1931-32 | Clara E. Howard | Emory University |
| 1932-33 | Arthur Elmore Bostwick | St. Louis Public Library |
| 1933-34 | Sydney B. Mitchell | University of California, Berkeley |
| 1934-35 | Phineas L. Windsor | University of Illinois Urbana-Champaign |
| 1935-36 | Ralph Munn | Carnegie Institute of Technology |
| 1936-37 | Ethel M. Fair | New Jersey College, Rutgers |
| 1937-38 | Harriet E. Howe | University of Denver Graduate Library School |
| 1938-39 | Louis Round Wilson | University of Chicago Graduate Library School |
| 1939-40 | Tommie Dora Barker | Emory University |
| 1940-41 | Lucie E. Fay | Columbia University |
| 1941-42 | Herman H. Henkle | Simmons College |
| 1942-43 | Leon Carnovsky | University of Chicago Graduate Library School |
| 1943-44 | Frances H. Kelly | Carnegie Institute of Technology |
| 1944-45 | Alice Higgins | Rutgers School of Library Service, New Jersey |
| 1945-46 | Anne M. Boyd | University of Illinois Urbana-Champaign |
| 1946-47 | Florrinell F. Morton | Louisiana State University |
| 1947-48 | George C. Allez | University of Wisconsin, Madison |
| 1948-49 | Rudolph Hjalmar Gjelsness | University of Michigan |
| 1949-50 | J. Periam Danton | University of California, Berkeley |
| 1950-51 | Rose B. Phelps | University of Illinois Urbana-Champaign |
| 1951-52 | C. Irene Hayner | University of Minnesota |
| 1952-53 | Carl Melinat | Syracuse University |
| 1953-54 | Louise LeFevre | Western Michigan University |
| 1954-55 | Harold Lancour | University of Illinois Urbana-Champaign |
| 1955-56 | Frances N. Cheney | Peabody University |
| 1956-57 | Lowell A. Martin | Rutgers University |
| 1957-58 | Esther Stallmann | University of Texas, Austin |
| 1958-59 | David K. Berninghausen | University of Minnesota |
| 1959-60 | David K. Berninghausen | University of Minnesota |
| 1960-61 | Edward A. Wight | University of California, Berkeley |
| 1961-62 | Martha Boaz | University of Southern California |
| 1962-63 | Wayne Yenawine | Syracuse University |
| 1963-64 | Wayne Yenawine | Syracuse University |
| 1964-65 | Jesse Shera | Case Western Reserve University |
| 1965-66 | L. Dorothy Bevis | University of Washington |
| 1966-67 | LeRoy C. Merritt | University of California |
| 1967-68 | Virginia Lacy Jones | Atlanta University |
| 1968-69 | Samuel Rothstein | University of British Columbia |
| 1969-70 | Rev. James J. Kortendick | Catholic University |
| 1970-71 | Patricia B. Knapp | Wayne State University |
| 1971-72 | Margaret E. Monroe | University of Wisconsin-Madison |
| 1972-73 | Thomas Slavens | University of Michigan |
| 1973-74 | R. Brian Land | University of Toronto |
| 1974-75 | Elizabeth W. Stone | Catholic University |
| 1975-76 | Kenneth E. Vance | University of Michigan |
| 1976-77 | Guy Garrison | Drexel University |
| 1977-78 | Margaret K. Goggin | University of Denver |
| 1978-79 | Gary R. Purcell | University of Tennessee |
| 1979-80 | Genevieve Casey | Wayne State University |
| 1980-81 | Charles A. Bunge | University of Wisconsin-Madison |
| 1981-82 | Harold Goldstein | Florida State University |
| 1982-83 | F. William Summers | University of South Carolina |
| 1983-84 | Robert D. Stueart | Simmons College |
| 1984-85 | Jane B. Robbins | University of Wisconsin-Madison |
| 1985-86 | Norman Horrocks | Dalhousie University |
| 1986-87 | Ann Prentice | University of Tennessee |
| 1987-88 | Kathleen M. Heim | Louisiana State University |
| 1988-89 | Leigh S. Estabrook | University of Illinois |
| 1989-90 | Miles M. Jackson | University of Hawaii at Manoa |
| 1990-91 | Phyllis Van Orden | Florida State University |
| 1991-92 | Evelyn Daniel | University of North Carolina at Chapel Hill |
| 1992-93 | Adele M. Fasick | University of Toronto |
| 1993-94 | Timothy W. Sineath | University of Kentucky |
| 1994-95 | Charles Curran | University of South Carolina |
| 1995-96 | June Lester | University of Oklahoma |
| 1996-97 | Joan C. Durrance | University of Michigan |
| 1997-98 | Toni Carbo | University of Pittsburgh |
| 1998-99 | Shirley Fitzgibbons | Indiana University |
| 1999-00 | Shirley Fitzgibbons | Indiana University |
| 2000-01 | James M. Matarazzo | Simmons College |
| 2001-02 | Prudence Dalrymple | Dominican University |
| 2002-03 | Elizabeth Aversa | University of Tennessee |
| 2003-04 | Louise S. Robbins | University of Wisconsin-Madison |
| 2004-05 | Louise S. Robbins | University of Wisconsin-Madison |
| 2005-06 | Ken Haycock | San Jose State University |
| 2006-07 | John Budd | University of Missouri-Columbia |
| 2007-08 | Connie Van Fleet | University of Oklahoma |
| 2008-09 | Michèle V. Cloonan | Simmons College |
| 2009-10 | Linda C. Smith | University of Illinois at Urbana-Champaign |
| 2010-11 | Lorna Peterson | University at Buffalo |
| 2011-12 | Lynne C. Howarth | University of Toronto |
| 2012-13 | Melissa Gross | Florida State University |
| 2013-14 | Eileen Abels | Simmons College |
| 2014-15 | Clara Chu | University of North Carolina at Greensboro |
| 2015-16 | Samantha Hastings | University of South Carolina |
| 2016-17 | Louise Spiteri | Dalhousie University |
| 2017-18 | Dietmar Wolfram | University of Wisconsin-Milwaukee |
| 2018-19 | Heidi Julien | University at Buffalo |
| 2019-20 | Stephen Bajjaly | Wayne State University |
| 2020-21 | Sandra Hirsh | San Jose State University |
| 2021-22 | Lisa O’Connor | University of North Carolina at Greensboro |
| 2022-23 | Rong Tang | Simmons University |
| 2023-24 | Lucy Santos Green | University of Iowa |
| 2024-25 | Vanessa Irvin | East Carolina University |
| 2025-26 | Sean Burns | University of Kentucky |
