= Joseph W. Lippincott Award =

Award for librarians established in 1938

The Joseph W. Lippincott Award was established in 1938 by publisher Joseph Wharton Lippincott and is now awarded by the American Library Association.

It is presented annually to a librarian for distinguished service to the profession of librarianship, such service to include outstanding participation in the activities of the professional library association, notable published professional writing, or other significant activity on behalf of the profession and its aims.

It is named for its founder, publisher Joseph Wharton Lippincott, past president and chairman of the board of J. B. Lippincott Company. His son, Joseph Wharton Lippincott, Jr., who also led the Philadelphia publishing company and was a chair of National Library Week, regularly attended the annual conference of the American Library Association to present the award. It is now presented by his grandson, Joseph Wharton Lippincott III, who was the fifth generation of the Lippincott family at J. B. Lippincott Company and led its successors, Lippincott-Raven Publishers and Lippincott Williams and Wilkins.

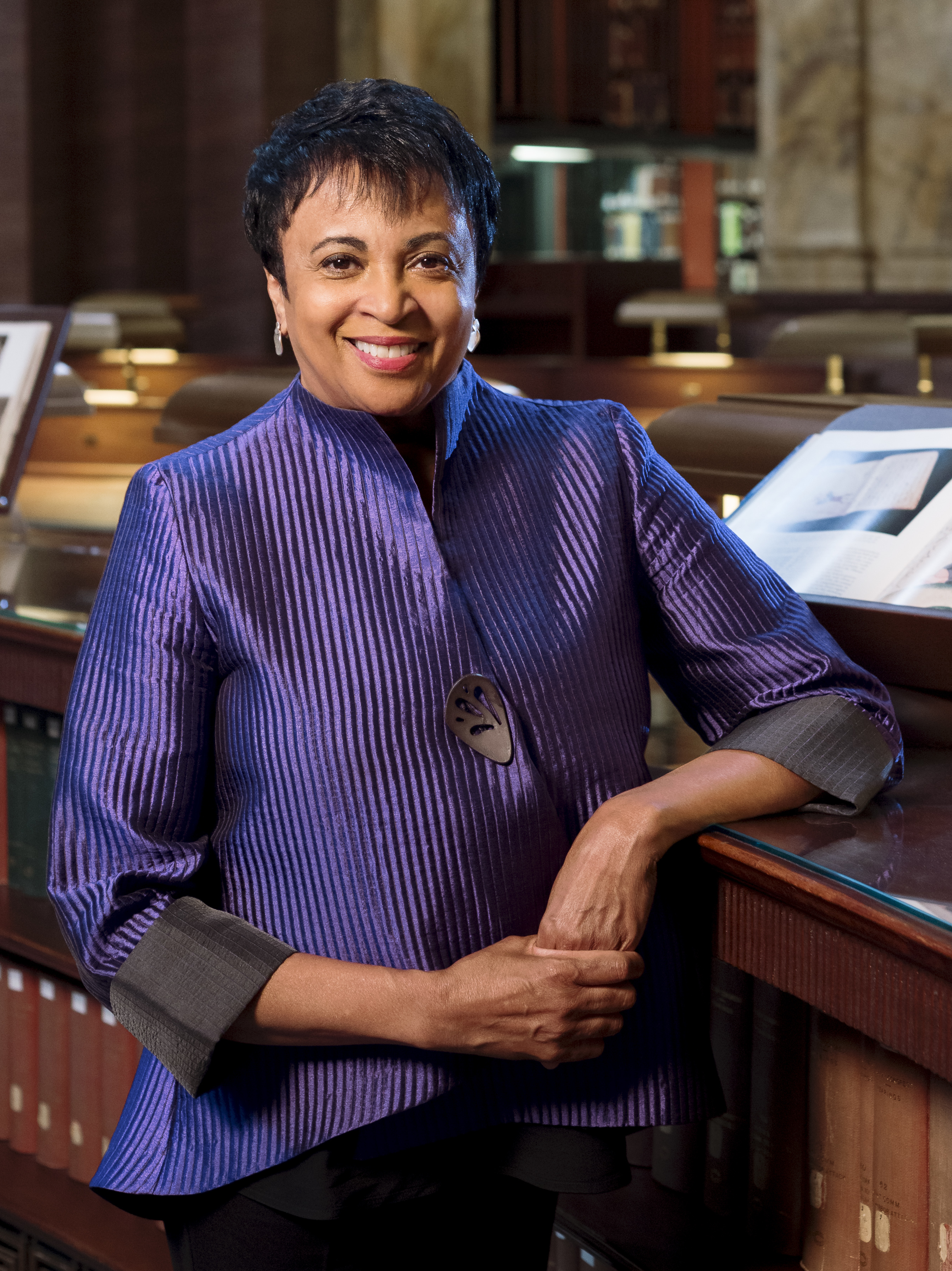
Librarian of Congress, Carla Hayden, 2013-Joseph W. Lippincott Award

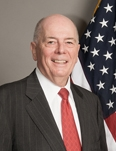
Winston Tabb, 2007 - Joseph W. Lippincott Award

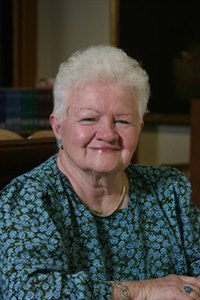
Peggy Sullivan, 1991 - Joseph W. Lippincott Award

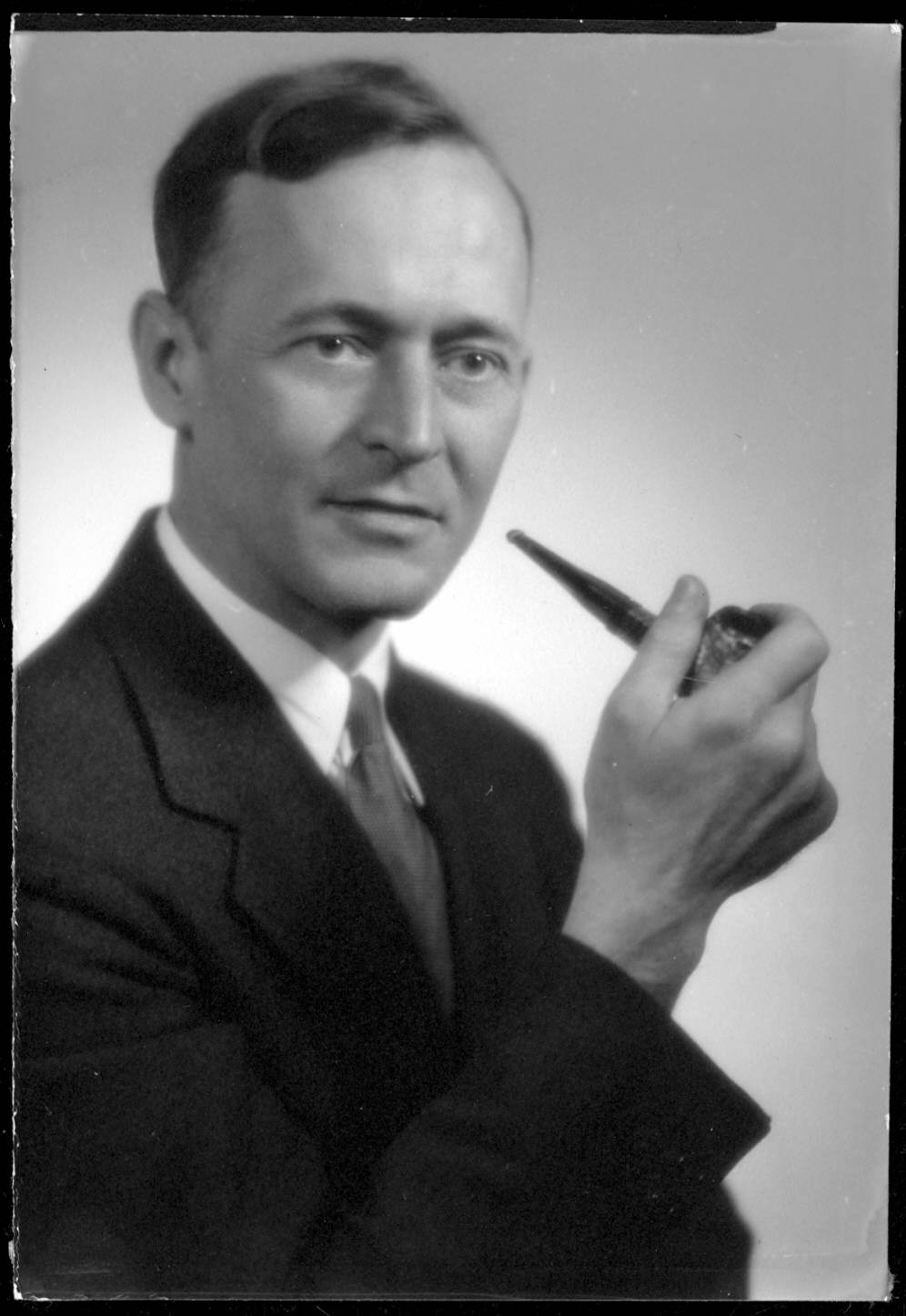
Verner W. Clapp, 1960 - Joseph W. Lippincott Award

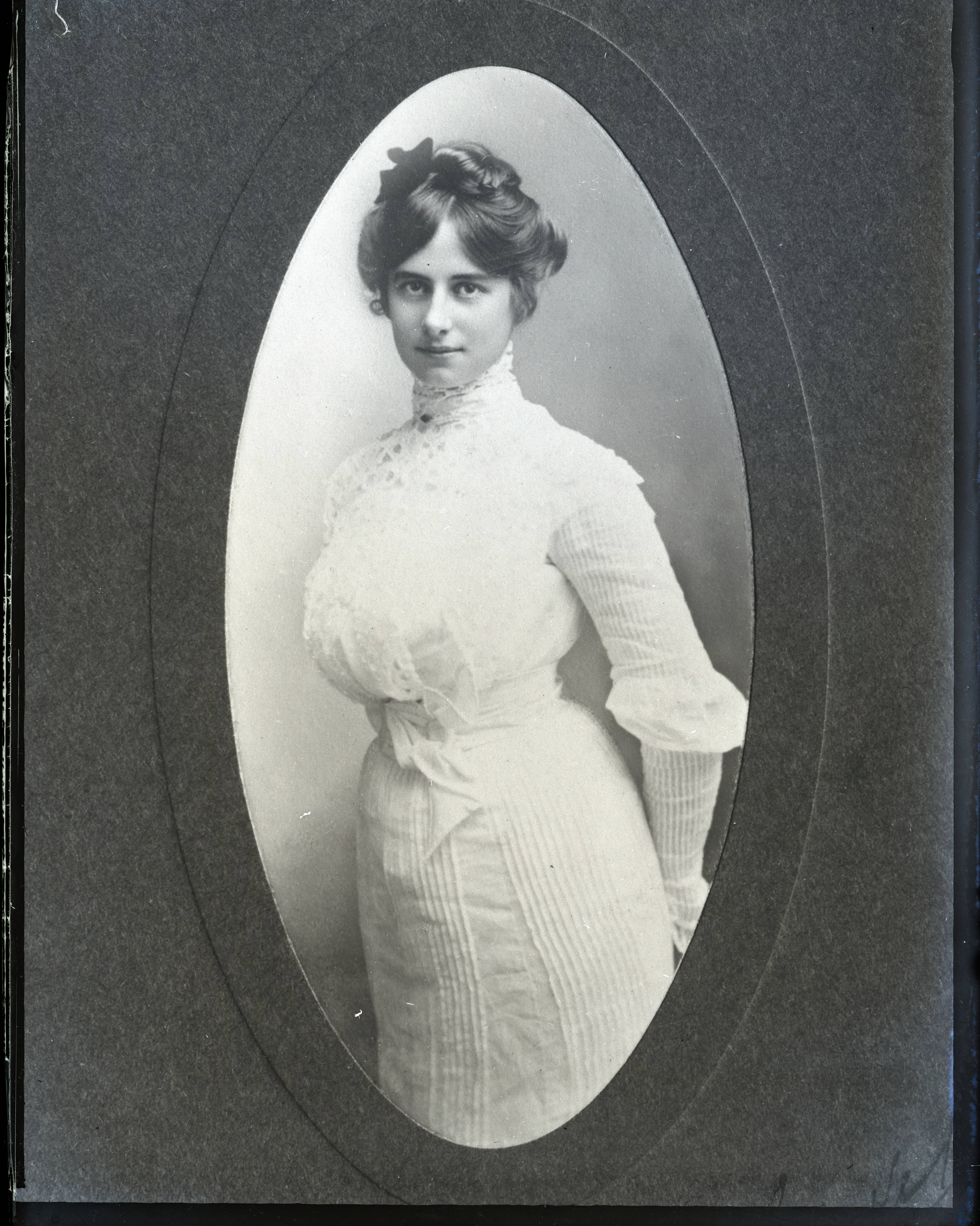
Essae Martha Culver, 1959 - Joseph W. Lippincott Award

H. W. Wilson, 1950 -Joseph W. Lippincott Award

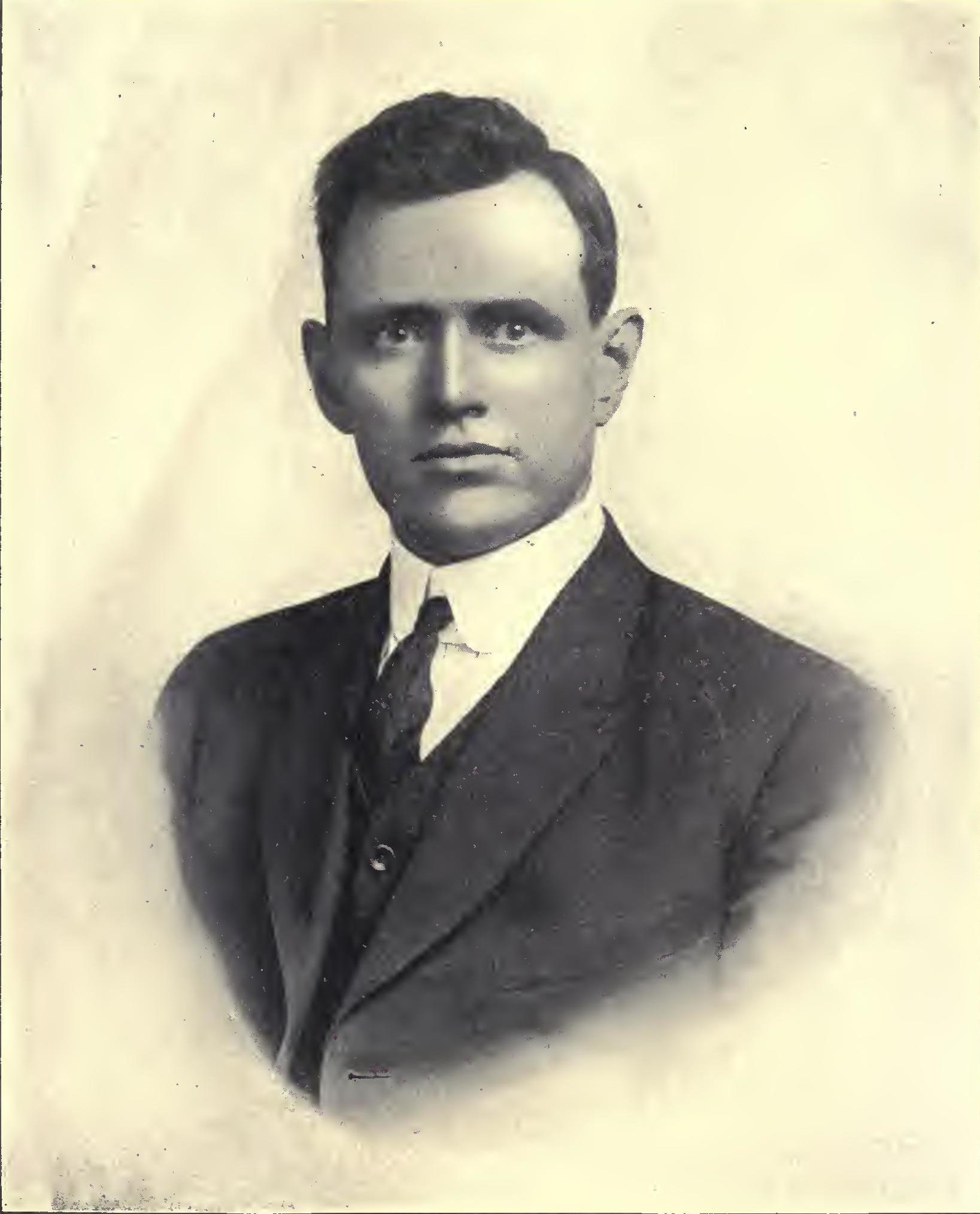
Carl H. Milam, 1948 - Joseph W. Lippincott Award

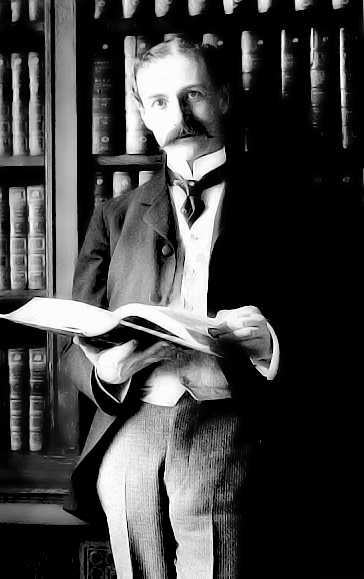
Herbert Putnam, 1939 - Joseph W. Lippincott Award

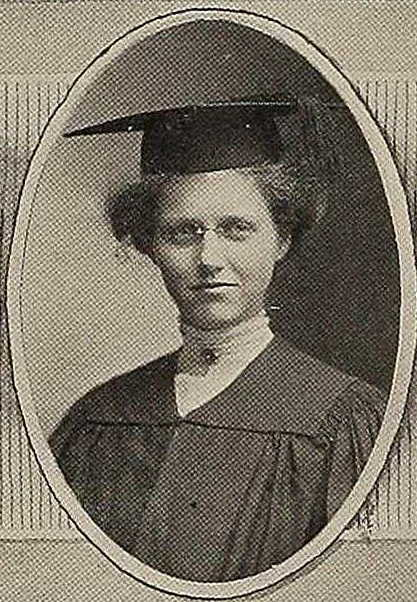
Mary Utopia Rothrock, 1938 - Joseph W. Lippincott Award

Joseph W. Lippincott Award	Date	Major accomplishments
Sara Kelly Johns	2026	President, American Association of School Librarians; President, New York Library Association
Clara Bohrer	2025	President, Public Library Association; Every Child Ready to Read-leadership.
Nicole A. Cooke	2024	Augusta Baker Endowed Chair, University of South Carolina, American Library Association Equality Award.
Julius C. Jefferson Jr.	2023	Section Head, Foreign Affairs, Defense and Trade at the Library of Congress, President, American Library Association, President, Freedom to Read Foundation.
Kenneth Yamashita	2022	President, Asian Pacific American Librarians Association, Joint Council of Librarians of Color.
Robert R. Newlen	2021	Deputy Librarian of Congress, American Library Association Endowment Trustee.
Mary Ghikas	2020	Executive Director, American Library Association.
Kathleen de la Peña McCook	2019	Professor of librarianship, University of South Florida, Beta Phi Mu Award, President, Association for Library and Information Science Education.
Sally Gardner Reed	2018	Executive Director, FOLUSA, (Friends of Libraries USA), integration of FOLUSA into American Library Association as United for Libraries.
Barbara Stripling	2017	President, American Library Association, President, Freedom to Read Foundation, professor, Syracuse University School of Information Studies.
Maureen Sullivan	2016	President, American Library Association, President Association of College and Research Libraries, President Library Leadership and Management Association.
James G. Neal	2015	Vice President for Information Services and University Librarian at Columbia University, President, American Library Association.
Maurice J. Freedman	2014	President, American Library Association, Director, Westchester Library System, NY.
Carla Hayden	2013	Librarian of Congress, President, American Library Association, executive director, Enoch Pratt Free Library.
Carla J. Stoffle	2012	Dean of the University of Arizona Libraries, ALA Medal of Excellence.
Camila Alire	2011	President, American Library Association, President, REFORMA.
Thomas C. Phelps	2010	Director of the Division of Public Programs at the National Endowment for the Humanities, Director Salt Lake City Public Library, Central Library.
Beverly P. Lynch	2009	Dean, University of California Los Angeles UCLA School of Education and Information Studies, President, American Library Association, Beta Phi Mu Award.
Duane Webster	2008	Executive Director, Association of Research Libraries, founder of Library Copyright Alliance.
Winston Tabb	2007	Dean of University Libraries and Museums at Johns Hopkins University, Associate Librarian of Congress.
Betty J. Turock	2006	President, American Library Association, Dean and professor, Rutgers School of Communication and Information
Donald J. Sager	2005	President, Public Library Association, Director of the Milwaukee Public Library.
Clifford A. Lynch	2004	Director, Coalition for Networked Information, President and recipient of Award of Merit, American Society for Information Science and Technology.
Susan Kent	2003	Director of Los Angeles Public Library, President, Public Library Association.
Ann K. Symons	2002	President and Treasurer, American Library Association.
Patricia G. Schuman	2001	President and Treasurer, American Library Association, Founder, Neal-Schuman Publishers
John Y. Cole	2000	Founding director of the Center for the Book, Library of Congress, first official historian of the Library of Congress.
Peggy Barber	1999	Director of Communications, founder of ALA Graphics, American Library Association.
Judith Krug	1998	Director, Office for Intellectual Freedom, American Library Association, Director, Freedom to Read Foundation.
Richard M. Dougherty	1997	Director, Libraries University of California, Berkeley and University of Michigan, President, American Library Association.
F. William Summers	1996	Dean, Florida State University School of Information, President, American Library Association.
Norman Horrocks	1995	Director, School of Information Management, Dalhousie University, Officer of the Order of Canada.
Frank Kurt Cylke	1994	Director, National Library Service for the Blind and Physically Handicapped at the Library of Congress.
John G. Lorenz	1993	Director, Library Services Branch, U.S. Office of Education, Deputy Librarian of Congress, executive director of the Association of Research Libraries.
John N. Berry	1992	Editor of Library Journal for over fifty years.
Peggy Sullivan	1991	President and executive director, American Library Association, author of Carl H. Milam and the American Library Association.
Alphonse F. Trezza	1990	Executive Director of the National Commission on Libraries and Information Science, Director of the Illinois State Library.
Robert Wedgeworth	1989	President, International Federation of Library Associations, University Librarian, University of Illinois at Urbana-Champaign, Founding President of ProLiteracy Worldwide, executive director of the American Library Association.
Henriette D. Avram	1988	Developed the MARC format (Machine Readable Cataloging), Associate Librarian for Collections Services, Library of Congress.
Edward G. Holley	1987	Dean UNC School of Information and Library Science, President, American Library Association, Beta Phi Mu Award.
Elizabeth W. Stone	1986	Director, Catholic University School of Library and Information Science, President of the American Library Association, Beta Phi Mu Award.
Robert G. Vosper	1985	Director, libraries at the University of California, Los Angeles, President, American Library Association, President, Association of College and Research Libraries.
Nettie Barcroft Taylor	1984	Director, Maryland State Library, Command Librarian for the U.S. Army in Heidelberg, Germany, Maryland Women's Hall of Fame.
Russell E. Bidlack	1983	Dean, School of Library Science, University of Michigan, chair, Committee on Accreditation. Beta Phi Mu Award.
Keith Doms	1982	Director, Free Library of Philadelphia , President, American Library Association.
Eric Moon	1981	Editor-in-Chief, Library Journal, President, American Library Association.
E.J. Josey	1980	President, American Library Association, President Black Caucus of the American Library Association.
Helen H. Lyman	1979	Director Adult Education Survey at American Library Association, faculty member, University of Wisconsin–Madison iSchool.
Henry T. Drennan	1978	State Librarian Idaho State Library, Senior Program Officer, Office of Libraries and Learning Resources, U.S. Department of Health, Education and Welfare.
Virginia Lacy Jones	1977	Dean, Atlanta University School of Library Sciences, President, Association for Library and Information Science Education, Beta Phi Mu Award.
Lester Asheim	1976	Director, International Relations and Director. Office for Library Education, American Library Association. Professor, University of Chicago Graduate Library School and UNC School of Information and Library Science, Beta Phi Mu Award.
Leon Carnovsky	1975	Professor, University of Chicago Graduate Library School, editor of the Library Quarterly, President, Association for Library and Information Science Education, Beta Phi Mu Award
Jerrold Orne	1974	Chaired Z39 Committee, precursor to National Information Standards Organization, Librarian who established a working reference library for the first United Nations Conference. Director, University of North Carolina at Chapel Hill libraries and professor of Library Science at the University of North Carolina at Chapel Hill.
Jesse H. Shera	1973	President, Association for Library and Information Science Education, library historian,Beta Phi Mu Award.
Guy R. Lyle	1972	President, Association of College and Research Libraries, Director of libraries at Louisiana State University, and Emory University, author of The Administration of the College Library.
William S. Dix	1971	Librarian at Princeton University, President, American Library Association, primary author of The Freedom to Read statement.
Paul Howard	1970	First Director of American Library Association Washington Office. Library of Congress. Chief Librarian, Office of War Information, World War II.
Germaine Krettek	1969	Director of the American Library Association, Washington Office (1957-1972), secured the actual funding for rural library service which was authorized under the Library Services Act.
Lucile Nix	1968	Chief Library Consultant for the Public Libraries of Georgia, President, Southeastern Library Association, Tennessee Library Association
Edmon Low	1967	Head librarian, Oklahoma State University 1940–1967 named in his honor: Edmon Low Library, President, Association of College and Research Libraries.
Keyes DeWitt Metcalf	1966	Director, Harvard Library, President, American Library Association, author.
Frances Clarke Sayers	1965	Superintendent of the Department of Work with Children, New York Public Library, author, lecturer and consultant on children's literature.
Robert Bingham Downs	1964	University Librarian, University of Illinois at Urbana-Champaign, President, American Library Association, President, Illinois Library Association, author.
Frances E. Henne	1963	Professor, University of Chicago Graduate Library School and School of Library Service at Columbia University, AASL Standards for School Library Programs, Beta Phi Mu Award.
David Horace Clift	1962	Executive Director, American Library Association, President of the Connecticut Library Association, U.S. Army, Office of Strategic Services during World War II.
Joseph L. Wheeler	1961	Director, Enoch Pratt Free Library, author Library War Service during World War I.
Verner W. Clapp	1960	Library of Congress- many positions including Acting Librarian of Congress, author, founder of the United Nations Library, President of the Council on Library Resources.
Essae Martha Culver	1959	First state librarian of Louisiana, President, American Library Association, President, Louisiana Library Association.
Carleton B. Joeckel	1958	Director, Berkeley Public Library, Captain in World War I-Silver Star, President, California Library Association and Michigan Library Association, Professor, University of Chicago Graduate Library School, author.
Flora Belle Ludington	1957	Head librarian for Mount Holyoke College, President, American Library Association.
Ralph A. Ulveling	1956	Director, Detroit Public Library, President, Michigan Library Association, President, American Library Association, defender of intellectual freedom.
Emerson Greenaway	1955	Director, Enoch Pratt Free Library, Director, Free Library of Philadelphia, President, American Library Association.
Marian C. Manley	1953	Chair, American Library Association. Committee on Relations with Local Groups, Head, Business Branch Newark Public Library, Editor, Special Libraries Association journal, Special Libraries.
Carl Vitz	1952	Director, Toledo-Lucas County Public Library, Minneapolis Public Library, Public Library of Cincinnati and Hamilton County, President, American Library Association.
Helen E. Haines	1951	Author of Living with Books, editor, lecturer.
H.W. Wilson	1950	Publisher, founder of the H. W. Wilson Company, creator of the Readers' Guide, the Cumulative Book Index, and the Book Review Digest.
Harry Miller Lydenberg	1949	Director, New York Public Library, President, American Library Association, author.
Carl H. Milam	1948	Executive Director of the American Library Association, Library War Service in World War I, Director of the United Nations Library.
No award given	1943-1947	
Herbert Putnam	1939	Librarian of Congress, Librarian, Boston Public Library, President, American Library Association.
Mary U. Rothrock	1938	Supervisor, Tennessee Valley Authority libraries, President, Tennessee Library Association and Southeastern Library Association, President, American Library Association.
Jennie M. Flexner	1938	Readers' advisor, New York Public Library, suffragist, author.
