= Break the Bank (1945 game show) =

American quiz show hosted by Bert Parks

- Also known as: Break the $250,000 Bank
- Genre: Game show
- Presented by: Bert Parks; Bud Collyer
- Country of origin: United States

Production
- Running time: 30 minutes

Original release
- Network: Mutual Radio (1945-1946, 1954-1955); ABC Radio and / or ABC (1946-1949, 1954-1956); NBC Radio Network and / or NBC (1949-1952, 1953-1955, 1956-1957); CBS (1952-1953)
- Release: October 20, 1945 – January 15, 1957

Break the Bank is an American quiz show which aired variously – and sometimes co-existed in separate radio and television forms – on Mutual Radio (where it was originally launched, in 1945), ABC Radio and NBC Radio Network, as well ABC (first televised version, in 1948), CBS and NBC television, from 1945 to 1957. From October 1956 to January 1957, NBC aired a short-lived prime-time television version called Break the $250,000 Bank.

== Broadcast history ==
Sponsored by Vicks, the series began on Mutual Radio on October 20, 1945, heard Saturdays until April 13, 1946. Initially, it featured different hosts each week, including John Reed King and Johnny Olson. Bert Parks became the full-time host in 1946. The questions were written by Joseph Nathan Kane, the author of Famous First Facts, who hand-delivered the sealed envelopes to the radio studio. Jack Rubin directed for producers Walt Framer and Ed Wolf.

With Vitalis Hair Tonic as the sponsor, the series returned Friday, July 5, 1946, on ABC Radio for a run until September 23, 1949. Bud Collyer and Bob Shepherd were the announcers, and Peter Van Steeden provided the music.

On October 5, 1949, the radio series moved to the NBC Radio Network, continuing until September 13, 1950. The radio broadcast was heard weekdays on NBC in 1950-51 and moved back to ABC weekdays for 1951–53. With Miles Laboratories as the sponsor, the radio show moved back to weekdays on NBC for 1953–55, overlapping with a weekday radio series on Mutual during 1954–55.

=== 1948 television ===
On October 22, 1948, a televised version started broadcasting on ABC as a simulcast of the radio program. An announcement of the premiere TV episode said that the program would be unchanged from the radio version except for some staging modifications. Bert Parks was the host, and Marshall Diskin was the director. The co-existing radio and television broadcasts were co-hosted by Parks and Collyer. That same year, Radio Mirror called Break the Bank "the highest-paying quiz program in the world".

== Gameplay ==
Contestants were drawn from the studio audience and brought up on stage to play a quiz game. The contestant was asked a series of questions, each worth progressively more money. The goal was to provide enough correct answers (eight, later seven) before making two mistakes. The final question was the "break the bank" question worth all the money in the bank, which began at $1,000. The first incorrect answer returned the player to the previous cash level, and a second miss ended the game and the contestant kept his or her current winnings. The same amount would then be added to the bank. At first, the question values before the bank were $10, $20, $50, $100, $200, $300, and $500. By the mid 1950s, the first right answer won the contestant $25, and the values increased to $50, $100, $200, $300, $500, and finally the bank. On the short-lived daytime edition, the values were $10, $20, $30, $50, $100, $200, $300, and the bank which started at $500.

== Break the $250,000 Bank ==
In this 1956 NBC prime time revival, the rules slightly changed. The contestant picked a category and was asked five questions on that category worth $100 a piece with one wrong answer ending the game. If they get all five right they could walk with $500 or risk it and answer on one question that would up the score to $5,000. The contestant would then return for the next several weeks to answer more $5,000 questions. Prize money increased as the player continued, up to $250,000. A wrong answer along the way simply ended the game. Each multiple of $25,000 would be guaranteed in case of a miss.

== Records ==
The record bank win was $9,020 until Break the $250,000 Bank was created in response to The $64,000 Question and other big-money shows. However, that version ran for only three months (October 9, 1956, to January 15, 1957), and no contestants won any more than $60,000 (won by dentist Harry Duncan).

The most notable contestants during this period were actress Ethel Waters, who in January 1957 won $10,000 she said would go toward back taxes, and two escapees from the 1956 Hungarian Revolution who competed in a special category – "Fight for Freedom". Waters appeared on the last episode before the show was cancelled. She was announced for a new quiz show program Hold That Note, also hosted by Parks, which replaced Bank the following week and ran through April 2.

== Episode status ==
Some episodes survive, including three at the UCLA Film and Television Archive (two from 1950, one from 1955). An episode from October 19, 1949, survives at the Paley Center for Media.

== Board game ==
A board game based on the show was made by Bettye-B Games in 1955.

== See also ==
- Break the Bank (1976 game show)
- Break the Bank (1985 game show)
