= Halsey William Wilson =

American publisher (1868–1954)

- Born: May 12, 1868; Wilmington
- Died: March 1, 1954 (aged 85)
- Alma mater: University of Minnesota; Beloit College
- Occupation: Publisher
- Awards: Joseph W. Lippincott Award (1950); American Library Association Honorary Membership (1945)

Halsey William Wilson (May 12, 1868 – March 1, 1954) was the creator of the Readers' Guide, the Cumulative Book Index, and the Book Review Digest and founder of the H. W. Wilson Company, a publisher. In 1999, American Libraries named him one of the "100 Most Important Leaders We Had in the 20th Century".

== Biography ==
Born in Wilmington, Vermont, Wilson was orphaned at the age of two, and raised by his maternal grandparents. When he was 12, he moved to Iowa to live with an aunt, and later to Minnesota. He attended Beloit College, and later the University of Minnesota. He and a fellow student, Henry S. Morris, set up a student textbook store on campus in 1889, the roots of what would become the H. W. Wilson Company. In 1891, Wilson first conceived the idea of a regularly updated catalog of books, alphabetized by subject.

Wilson saved sufficient money to launch a service in 1898, investing $500 in the hope that he and his wife could enlist 500 subscribers to the service for a dollar a year. His first year, he would say later, "was memorable for some heartening endorsements, nearly 300 subscriptions, and a rapidly growing deficit". It was in 1900 that Wilson created the United States Catalog and the well-known green volumes of the Readers' Guide to Periodical Literature, known to librarians, teachers and students simply as "The Readers' Guide". The Book Review Digest was introduced in 1905. By 1913, Wilson had outgrown his Rochester, Minnesota, location and relocated his business, in 13 railcars, to White Plains, New York. Four years later, he moved to the Bronx, and the H.W. Wilson Company became one of the leading publishers of contemporary reference materials. As a supplement to the general interest magazine articles in the Readers' Guide, Wilson created more specialized guides to professional journals, such as the Industrial Arts Index (1913), the Agricultural Index (1916), the Education Index (1929), the Art Index (1929), the Bibliographic Index (1938), Current Biography (1940), the Biography Index (1946), the Play Index (1949), and the Short Story Index (1953). In addition to the subscription based guides, the H.W. Wilson Company published numerous well-known reference books, including Joseph Nathan Kane's Facts About the Presidents and Famous First Facts.

H.W. Wilson was awarded American Library Association Honorary Membership in 1945. and was honored with the Joseph W. Lippincott Award in 1950.

Halsey died on March 1, 1954, at the age of 85.

After his death the company established a program of scholarships for students studying to become librarians.
