= PUBLIB =

Public library online discussion forum

PUBLIB is an electronic discussion list devoted to issues relating to public-library administration and use. It was founded in December 1992 by Jean Armour Polly (then of NYSERNET, Inc., now a librarian in upstate New York) and the late John Iliff. PUBLIB is currently managed by volunteers Sara Weissman and Karen G. Schneider. Housed on the NYSERNET server until March 1997, and then on the UC Berkeley SunSITE until May 2005, PUBLIB is now hosted by WebJunction, a service of OCLC.

For several years, PUBLIB had a subset, PUBLIB-Net, focused on Internet use in public libraries. Because the Internet has become well integrated into library services, support for PUBLIB-Net as a separate list ended in 2000.

PUBLIB is oriented toward public librarians and public library managers and directors. Subscribers also include library trustees, members of library friends' groups, library-science students and faculty, library journalists, and advocates of librarianship. On June 13, 2010, PUBLIB had 9,684 subscribers in 14 countries, according to data gathered by WebJunction's administrative software.

PUBLIB's subscribers discuss library use and management, library technology, the mission of the library, librarianship as a profession, and library ethics. Operational questions are posed and answered (Hill, p. 34). Postings of library jobs are accepted and encouraged. Friday of each week is devoted to library anecdotes and humor.

Only subscribers may post to PUBLIB. Instructions for subscribing may be found on PUBLIB's general information page managed by OCLC.

Authors in the field of library and information science occasionally tap PUBLIB as a resource. One such author described PUBLIB as "a good cross-section of librarians engaged in public services, administration, technical support, and related responsibilities" (Sager, p. 73).

Postings from February 1993 to the present have been archived and can be browsed and searched.

PUBLIB mascot and social activities

The unofficial mascot of PUBLIB is the gadfly, representing the questioning and advocacy that are characteristic of its subscribers. Mary Jane Anderson wrote a pithy response to John N. Berry III editorial about PUBLIB. It is here: http://listserv.oclclists.org/scripts/wa.exe?A2=ind9702&L=Publib&P=R15904&1=Publib&9=A&J=on&K=2&d=No+Match%3BMatch%3BMatches&z=4

PUBLIB participants have gathered informally off the list, either online through personal email messages, through personal visits while traveling, or at library conferences such as those held by the Public Library Association and the American Library Association.

Best of PUBLIB

In June 2009, Robert Balliot set up a blog which reproduces postings from PUBLIB. He called it Best of PUBLIB. The posts are grouped by topic, and there is a listing of topics in the left hand column.{Note: Latest post is June 2014.}
