= CCNM =

CCNM may refer to:

- Canadian College of Naturopathic Medicine
- Canadian Council of Natural Mothers

== See also ==
- CCNMTL or Columbia Center for New Media Teaching and Learning
