= Lucile Nix =

American librarian (1903–1968)

- Born: March 4, 1903; Commerce, Georgia, United States
- Died: December 1, 1968 (aged 65)
- Education: Furman University (BA, 1925); Emory University (BA, 1930, library science)
- Occupation: Librarian

Lucile Nix (March 4, 1903 – December 1, 1968) was an American librarian. She was Georgia's head of public library services for 23 years.

== Career ==
Nix was born on March 4, 1903, in Commerce, Georgia to John Morgan and Ella Ludora Bennett Nix. Her father was a grocer and her mother had a passion for reading. She attended Furman University followed by Emory University, where in 1930 she earned a degree in library science. While in school Nix attended summer programs at Columbia University and the University of Chicago.

During the first years of her career, Nix worked at libraries in Winston-Salem, North Carolina and Knoxville, Tennessee, as well as at Emory. Her first job as a librarian was at Reynolds High School in Winston-Salem. Later, while in Tennessee and serving as president of the Tennessee Library Association, Nix was influential in convincing the Tennessee legislature to pass its first bill intended to provide state aid for regional libraries.

In 1945 she returned to Georgia. At the time, 33% of Georgia's population had no library access—after her decades-long service with Georgia's libraries, by 1968 the percentage had fallen to just 1.5%.

Nix was elected president of the Southeastern Library Association in 1958, and continued her involvement with the organization throughout the 1960s. She was also a trustee of the Georgia Library Trustees and Friends Association from 1949 to 1951. In 1963, Georgia governor Carl Sanders named her a member of the Georgia Commission on Aging. Nix served as president of the Atlanta Library Club, and in 1968 she was awarded the Joseph W. Lippincott Award.

== Legacy ==
After her death, the Nix–Jones Award for Distinction in Library Service was co-named in her honor. She never married and had no children.

On March 9, 2017, Nix was inducted into the Georgia Women of Achievement Hall of Fame at a ceremony at Wesleyan College in Macon. She was nominated by the Northeast Georgia Historical and Genealogical Society, the Georgia Library Association, and the Hall County Library System. Even during her lifetime Nix was known as "Miss Public Library."
