= Steven Anzovin =

American author (1954–2005)

- Steven Anzovin, c. 2000
- Born: September 10, 1954; Hartford, Connecticut
- Died: December 25, 2005 (aged 51); Amherst, Massachusetts
- Education: Connecticut College (BA); Pratt Institute (MFA)
- Known for: Author
- Parent(s): Russell Anzovin (Ames); Beverly (Gold) French

Steven E. Anzovin (September 10, 1954 – December 25, 2005) was an author and editor of reference and computer books, a computer journalist, and the co-founder of Anzovin Studio, a computer animation company. He wrote and edited 25 books and more than 300 magazine articles and was a pioneering advocate for green computing.

== Biography ==
Anzovin was born in Hartford, Connecticut, on September 10, 1954. His parents were Beverly (Gold) French, of Flat Rock, North Carolina, and Russell Ames (born Anzovin). Anzovin grew up in Wethersfield, Connecticut, where he attended the public schools. He studied at the University of Connecticut and graduated from Connecticut College with a Bachelor of Arts in studio art, cum laude, in 1976. In 1980 he received his Master of Fine Arts in New Media from Pratt Institute.

From 1981 to 2005, Anzovin and his wife, Janet Podell, ran a freelance writing and editing business, first in Englewood, NJ, and later in Amherst, MA. They specialized in compiling historical reference books, including many volumes in H.W. Wilson Company’s Famous First Facts and Facts About the Presidents series. For 14 years, they also compiled Art in America's Annual Guide to Galleries, Museums, and Artists for Brant Publications. Anzovin was senior contributing editor for MacAddict Magazine, East Coast editor for Computer Entertainment News, contributing editor and columnist for CD-ROM Today, and columnist and feature writer for Compute Magazine. His book The Green PC: Making Choices That Make a Difference (1993) drew attention to the impact of personal computing on the environment and encouraged readers to take steps to combat computer-generated pollution.

In 2000, Anzovin and his son Raf founded Anzovin Studio in the basement of their home in Amherst, Massachusetts. Anzovin served as President and CEO. Anzovin Studio provided animated content to numerous commercials, games, and made-for-DVD productions, including “GI Joe: Valor vs Venom” and “Halo 2.” Anzovin and his son also produced several short films during this time, including Duel (2005), Puppet (2001), and Java Noir (1997), all of which won numerous awards at international animation festivals.

== Works ==
- Facts about the Presidents
- Speeches of the American Presidents
- Famous First Facts About American Politics
- The green PC: making choices that make a difference
- Famous First Facts: First Happenings, Discoveries and Inventions in the United States

== Death ==
Anzovin died at his home in Amherst of colon cancer on December 25, 2005, at the age of 51. In addition to his wife and son, Steven was survived by two daughters, Miriam and Hannah, as well as his brother and mother.

== See also ==
- Miriam Anzovin
