= Camila Alire =

American librarian

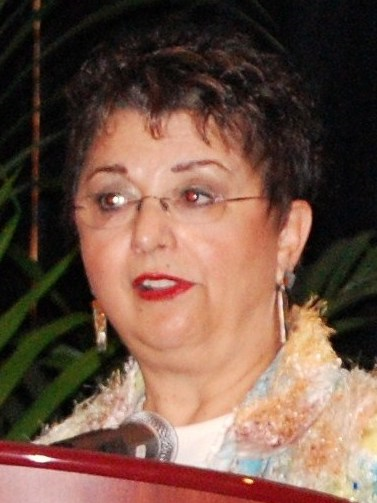
- Alire in 2010

President of the American Library Association
- In office 2009–2010
- Preceded by: James R. Rettig
- Succeeded by: Roberta A. Stevens

Personal details
- Occupation: Librarian

Camila Alire is an American librarian and was president of the American Library Association from 2009 to 2010. She was the first Hispanic president of the ALA. She was previously the president of REFORMA, National Association to Promote Library and Information Services to Latinos and the Spanish-speaking, in 1993-1994.

Alire is dean emerita at the University of New Mexico and Colorado State University. She is also the former dean of libraries at the University of Colorado at Denver. She has served as a professor of practice for Simmons College’s PhD program in managerial leadership in the information professions and as adjunct professor at San Jose State University Executive MLIS program.

In 2012 President Barack Obama appointed Alire as a member of the National Council on the Humanities. Her appointment began on January 7, 2013 and expired on January 26, 2018.

== Awards ==
Alire was honored with the Dr. Arnulfo D. Trejo Librarian of the Year Award by REFORMA in 1997.

In 2011 the American Library Association honored her with the Joseph W. Lippincott Award for distinguished service to the profession of librarianship.

She was honored with the American Library Association Equality Award in 2015.

In June 2019, Alire was recipient of the Elizabeth Martinez (librarian) Lifetime Achievement Award (LAA) by REFORMA. It is an award created to recognize those who have achieved excellence in librarianship over an extended (over 20 years) period of service and who have made significant, and lasting contributions to REFORMA, as well as to the Latino and the Spanish-speaking communities.

== Bibliography ==
- Management basics for information professionals (3rd ed.) with G. Edward Evans. ALA Editions (2013) ISBN 978-1555709099
- Academic Librarianship with G. Edward Evans. Neal-Schuman (2010) ISBN 1555707025
- Serving Latino Communities (Rev. ed.). Monograph co-authored with Jacqueline Ayala. Neal-Schuman Publishing (2007) ISBN 1555706061
- Academic Librarians as Emotional Intelligence Leaders. Monograph co-authored with Peter Hernon and Joan Giesecke. Westport, Connecticut: Libraries Unlimited, (2007). ISBN 1591585139
- Charting our Future: Advocating to Advance Academic Libraries in College and Research Libraries News. Vol. 55, No. 8, September 2005.
- Ask Camila [Alire]: It Can Be Done! Hispanic Outlook in Higher Education Magazine, November 7, 2005.
- “The Library Professional” in Perspectives, Insights & Priorities: 17 Leaders Speak Freely of Librarianship.(Norman Horrocks, ed.) (Lanham, Maryland: Scarecrow Press, Inc.), 2005. ISBN 0810853558
- “Two Intriguing Practices to Library Management Theory: Common Sense and Humanistic Applications,” Library Administration and Management, Vol. 18, No. 1, 2004.
- “The Silver Lining: Recovering from the Shambles of a Disaster,” Journal of Library Administration, Vol. 38, No. 1 and 2, 2003.
- “The New Beginnings Program: A Retention Program for Junior Faculty of Color,” Journal of Library Administration, Vol.33, No. 1 and 2, 2001.
- “Diversity and Leadership: The Color of Leadership,” Journal of Library Administration, Vol.32, Nos.3/4, 2001.
- Research Libraries in Colorado “Create Change. In ARL: A Bimonthly Report on Research Library
- "Issues and Actions from ARL, CNI, and SPARC," August, 2000. Co-authored with Jim Williams.
- Library Disaster Planning and Recovery Handbook, Neal-Schuman Publishing Company, New York, (Editor) 2000. Wrote four chapters.
- Serving Latino Communities. Monograph co-authored with Orlando Archibeque. Neal-Schumann Publishing Co., 1998.
- Ethnic Populations: A Model for Statewide Services, (28) American Libraries, November 1997: 38-40.
- Mentoring On My Mind: It Takes a Family to Graduate a Minority Library Professional, (28) American Libraries, November 1997: 41. Hispanic Business Magazine, October 1997
- Recruitment and Retention of Librarians of Color: The Future. In Creating Our Future: Essays on Librarianship. (Sally Reed, ed.) (Jefferson, NC: McFarland and Co.), 1996.
- Equal Access for All: A Reaction to ‘A Nation Connected, In Envisioning a Nation Connected. (Betty Turock, ed.) (Chicago: ALA), 1996.
- Changing a Library Services Faculty Model: The Major & Minor (M & M) Approach, In ACRL National Conference Proceedings, 1995. Co-authored.
- Recruitment of Minority Personnel in Libraries. In Culture Keepers II. Unity Through Diversity, Presentation, Conference Proceedings of the Second National Conference of African American Librarians. (Westwood, MA: Faxon), September 1995.
- Minorities and the Symbolic Potential of the Academic Library: Stewardship and Management Beyond Paternalism, College and Research Libraries, (56) November 1995: 509-517. Co-authored.
- Library Services to Ethnic Minority Populations - Long Range Plan, ERIC ED366 338. (Editor), August 1993.
- Futures: The Continued Search for Excellence, In Community College Libraries: A Pattern of Excellence, (Roseanne Kalich, ed.). (Metuchen, NJ: Scarecrow Press), 1992.
- Collection Evaluation: ‘Where’s the Beef' in Community College Library Collections? In Community College Reference Services, (William Katz, ed.). (Metuchen, NJ: Scarecrow Press), 1992.
- Libraries, Lobbying, and Legislative Issues, Colorado Libraries (18/4), December 1992: 4-5. (Guest Editor).
- The Community College Library’s Role in the Recruitment and Retention of Minority Students, Colorado Libraries, (17/3) September 1991: 5-8.
- If You Don’t Know Which Road to Take, Any Road Will Get You There, Colorado Libraries, (17/3) September 1991: 20-21.
- Education of Library Personnel, Colorado Libraries, September 1988. (Guest Editor).
- CLA Human Resources Directory, Colorado Library Association, 1987. (Editor).
- “Information and Library Technician Curriculum for Paraprofessionals,” Colorado Libraries, June 1987.
- Needs Analysis for Designing an Information/Library Technician Curriculum for Pikes Peak Community College, Community and Junior College Libraries, Summer 1986.

Non-profit organization positions
Preceded by James R. Rettig	President of the American Library Association; 2009–2010	Succeeded by Roberta A. Stevens
