= Peggy Barber =

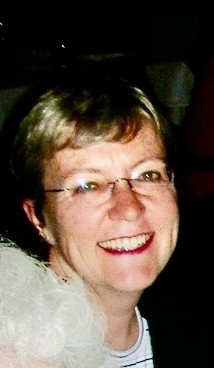
- Peggy Barber
- Born: Margaret Barber; 1943
- Died: 2019 (aged 75–76)
- Education: University of California, Riverside (B.A. English) Rutgers University (M.L.I.S.)
- Occupations: Librarian Marketing and communications expert
- Employer: American Library Association
- Known for: Pioneering library marketing and promotion Public Information Office
- Awards: Joseph W. Lippincott Award (1999)

Margaret “Peggy” Barber (1943 – 2019) was a pioneering librarian and marketing/communications expert at the American Library Association from 1970 to 2000.

== Education and career ==
Barber held a B.A. in English from the University of California–Riverside and an M.L.I.S. from Rutgers University.

She worked as a coordinator for the Orange County Cooperative Library System in California and as a reference librarian at the San Francisco Public Library.

== American Library Association ==
Barber served as Associate Executive Director for Communication at the American Library Association from 1970 -2000 and established several key programs that professionalized how libraries promote themselves nationwide.

These included creation of the ALA Public Information Office and Public Programs Office; the ALA Graphics program, which created Celebrity READ posters series; and the universal library logo.

In her role as associate executive director for communication, Barber launched National Library Week in 1975 as an initiative of the American Library Association.

Barber also chaired the National Coalition for Literacy.

== Legacy ==
In 1999, Barber received the American Library Association Joseph W. Lippincott Award for distinguished service to the library profession.

After Barber's death the Peggy Barber Tribute Grant was established within the American Library Association to support innovative library programming.

== Selected publications ==
- Barber, Peggy (January–February 2014). "Contagious Marketing: How Libraries Can Get More Word-of-Mouth Buzz". American Libraries. 45 (1/2): 32–35.
- Barber, Peggy (May 2003). "Mickey Mouse, Miss Piggy, and the Birth of ALA Graphics". American Libraries. 34 (5): 60–63.
- McCook, Kathleen de la Peña; Barber, Peggy (Fall 2002). "Public Policy as a Factor Influencing Adult Lifelong Learning, Adult Literacy and Public Libraries". Reference & User Services Quarterly. 42 (1): 66–75.
- McCook, Kathleen de la Peña; Barber, Peggy (January 2002). Chronology of Milestones for Libraries and Adult Lifelong Learning and Literacy (Report). ALA Committee on Literacy. ERIC ED458888.
- Barber, Peggy (2001). "The American Library Association's Literacy Initiatives: History and Hope". In DeCandido, GraceAnne A. (ed.). Literacy and Libraries: Learning from Case Studies. Chicago: American Library Association, Office for Literacy and Outreach Services. pp. 154–158.
- Barber, Peggy (May 1997). "Computers, Technology, Books—Yes, But Literacy Must Come First". American Libraries. 28: 42–43.
- Barber, Peggy; Crowe, Linda D. (1993). Getting Your Grant: A How-to-Do-It Manual for Librarians. New York: Neal-Schuman Publishers.
- Barber, Peggy, ed. (1982). Sixty-Eight Great Ideas: The Library Awareness Handbook. Chicago: American Library Association.
