= Barbara Stripling =

American librarian

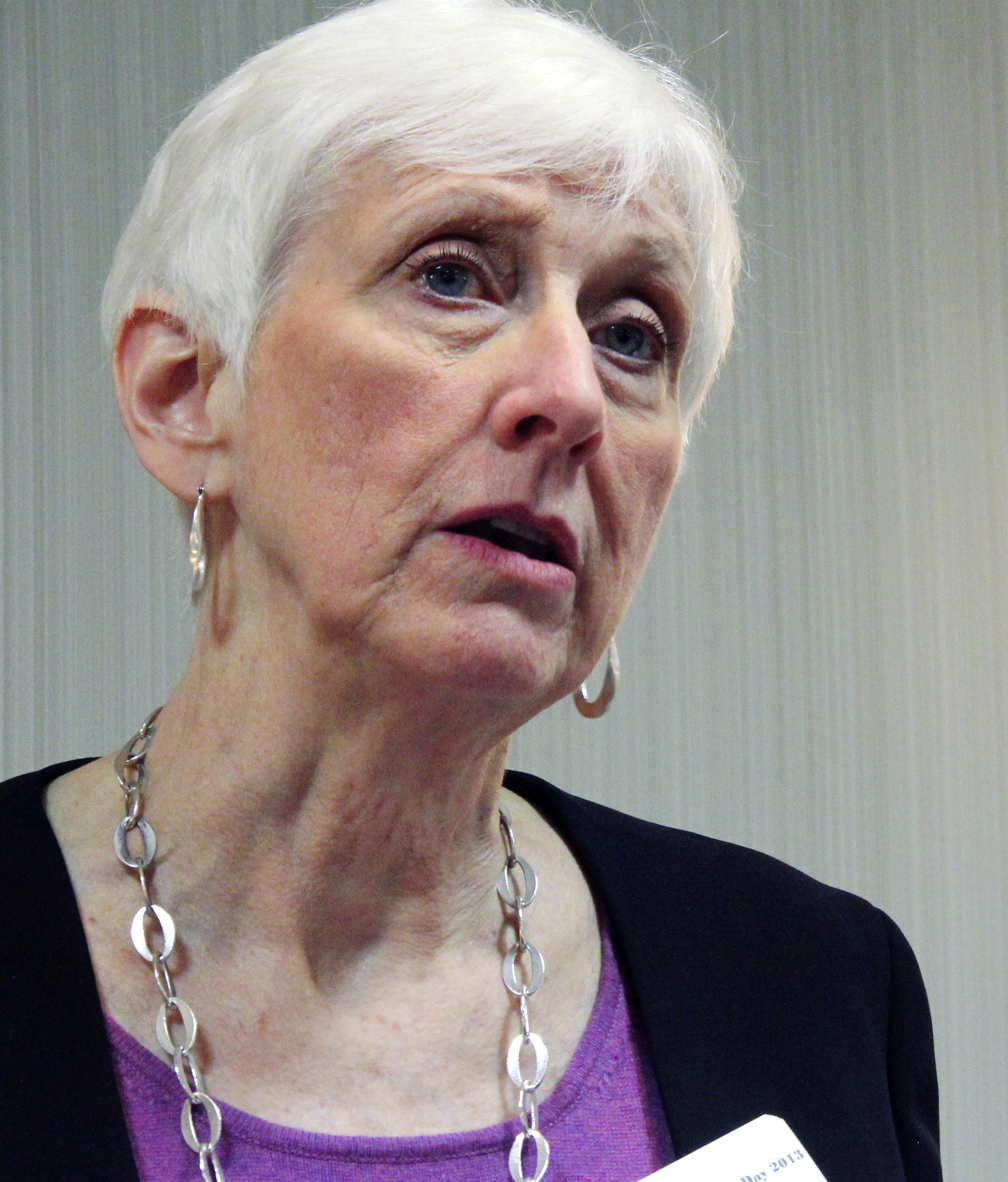

President of the American Library Association
- In office 2013–2014
- Preceded by: Maureen Sullivan
- Succeeded by: Courtney Young

President of the Freedom to Read Foundation
- In office 2020–current
- Preceded by: Emily Knox

Personal details
- Occupation: Librarian

Barbara Stripling is an American librarian and is the President of the Freedom to Read Foundation, a non-profit legal and educational organization affiliated with the American Library Association. Stripling served as president of the American Library Association from 2013 to 2014. During her term as president, she stressed that "Libraries Change Lives."

== Career ==
In July 2018, Stripling retired from her position as Senior Associate Dean at Syracuse University's School of Information Studies. She had previously served as assistant professor of Practice at Syracuse University. She started her career as a school librarian, and served as Director of Library Services for the New York City schools, a school library media specialist and school district director of libraries in Arkansas, and a library grant program director in Tennessee.

Stripling also serves on the board of the Freedom to Read Foundation. She was first elected as a trustee in 2018, reelected in 2020, and was later named president.

== Awards ==
- 2017 recipient of the Joseph W. Lippincott Award from the American Library Association.
- 2014 President's Award, presented by the Arkansas Library Association.
- 2012 New York State School Library System Association's Distinguished Service Award.
- 1990 Arkansas School Library Media Specialist of the Year.
- 1989 Retta Patrick Award, presented by the Arkansas Library Association.

== Selected publications ==
- Stripling, Barbara K., and Sandra Hughes-Hassell. Curriculum Connections Through the Library. Westport: Libraries Unlimited, 2003. ISBN 1563089734
- Stripling, Barbara K. Learning and Libraries in an Information Age: Principles and Practice. Englewood, Colorado: Libraries Unlimited and its Division Teacher Ideas Press, 1999. ISBN 1563086662
- Stripling, Barbara K., and Judy M. Pitts. Brainstorms and Blueprints: Teaching Library Research As a Thinking Process. Englewood, Colorado: Libraries Unlimited, 1988. ISBN 0872876381

Non-profit organization positions
Preceded by Maureen Sullivan	President of the American Library Association; 2013–2014	Succeeded by Courtney Young
