= Winston Tabb =

American academic administrator

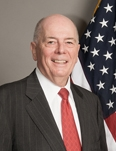
- Born: Tulsa, Oklahoma
- Education: Oklahoma Baptist University; Harvard University; Simmons College
- Occupation: Librarian
- Years active: 1972-Present
- Employer(s): Library of Congress; Johns Hopkins University
- Known for: Sheridan Dean of University Libraries and Museums at Johns Hopkins University
- Successor: Elisabeth Long (Sheridan Dean at Johns Hopkins University)

Winston Tabb was the Sheridan Dean of University Libraries and Museums at the Johns Hopkins University in Baltimore, Maryland from September 2002 to January 2023.

Tabb received his B.A. from Oklahoma Baptist University and earned an M.A. from Harvard University as a Woodrow Wilson Fellow. After returning from Thailand as an instructor of English for the U.S. Army, Tabb received his degree in library science in 1972 from Simmons College. Upon his graduation from Simmons, he was recruited to join the professional staff of the Library of Congress.

During his tenure at the Library of Congress Tabb served in a variety of roles. These include Assistant Chief of the General Reading Rooms Division; Chief of the Information & Reference Division, US COpyright Office; Chief of the Loan Division; and Acting Director of Research Services. He served as Acting Deputy Librarian of Congress, 1989-1992, and in 1992, was appointed as Associate Librarian of Congress for Library Services, where he managed 53 of the library's divisions and offices.

In September 2002, Tabb became Sheridan Dean of University Libraries and director of the Sheridan Libraries at the Johns Hopkins University. In July 2006, Tabb was appointed for a two-year term as Vice Provost for the Arts at JHU. He also served in other various offices: Director, the Sheridan Libraries, and Dean of University Museums, overseeing activities at both the Evergreen House & Library and Homewood House. On January 3, 2023, Tabb was succeeded by Elisabeth Long as the Sheridan dean.

In 1985 he was honored with the Melvil Dewey Medal by the American Library Association and in 2007 received the Association's Joseph W. Lippincott Award. He also received the L. Roy Patterson Award for contributions to copyright; and the OCLC /Forest Press Award for distinguished service to international librarianship.

In 2010, Tabb was appointed to the Board of the Institute for Museum and Library Services (IMLS) by President Obama.

Mr. Tabb has been very active in international librarianship, for 35* years, having served the International Federation of Library Associations & Institutions (IFLA) in a variety of roles. These include service as secretary of the Interlending & Document Delivery Section; Chair and Secretary of the National Libraries Section; Chair and Secretary of the division comprising national libraries; Chair of the Professional Committee; member of the Governing Board; Chair of the Copyright & Other Legal Matters Committee; Head of IFLA's delegation to the World Intellectual Property Organisation (2002-2022). In 2013 Mr. Tabb was awarded IFLA's highest honor, being named by the Governing Board as an IFLA Honorary Fellow.

In other areas of international librarianship Mr. Tabb was chosen by UNESCO as a member of the committees overseeing planning for the new national library of Latvia, and rebuilding of the national library in Sarajevo. Mr. Tabb also served on UNESCO's Memory of the World Committee, 1999-2003. He was appointed as ALA's representative to the Board of the American Library in Paris in 2010, and continues to serve on its advisory board. He is also a member of the board of the American Trust for the British Library, where he serves as chair of the lectures committee; and in that role most recently organized a broadcast "conversation" between the Librarian of Congress, Dr. Carla Hayden, and the current chief executive of the British Library, Sir Roly Keating, and his recently named successor, Rebecca Lawrence.
