= James R. Rettig =

American librarian (1950–2022)

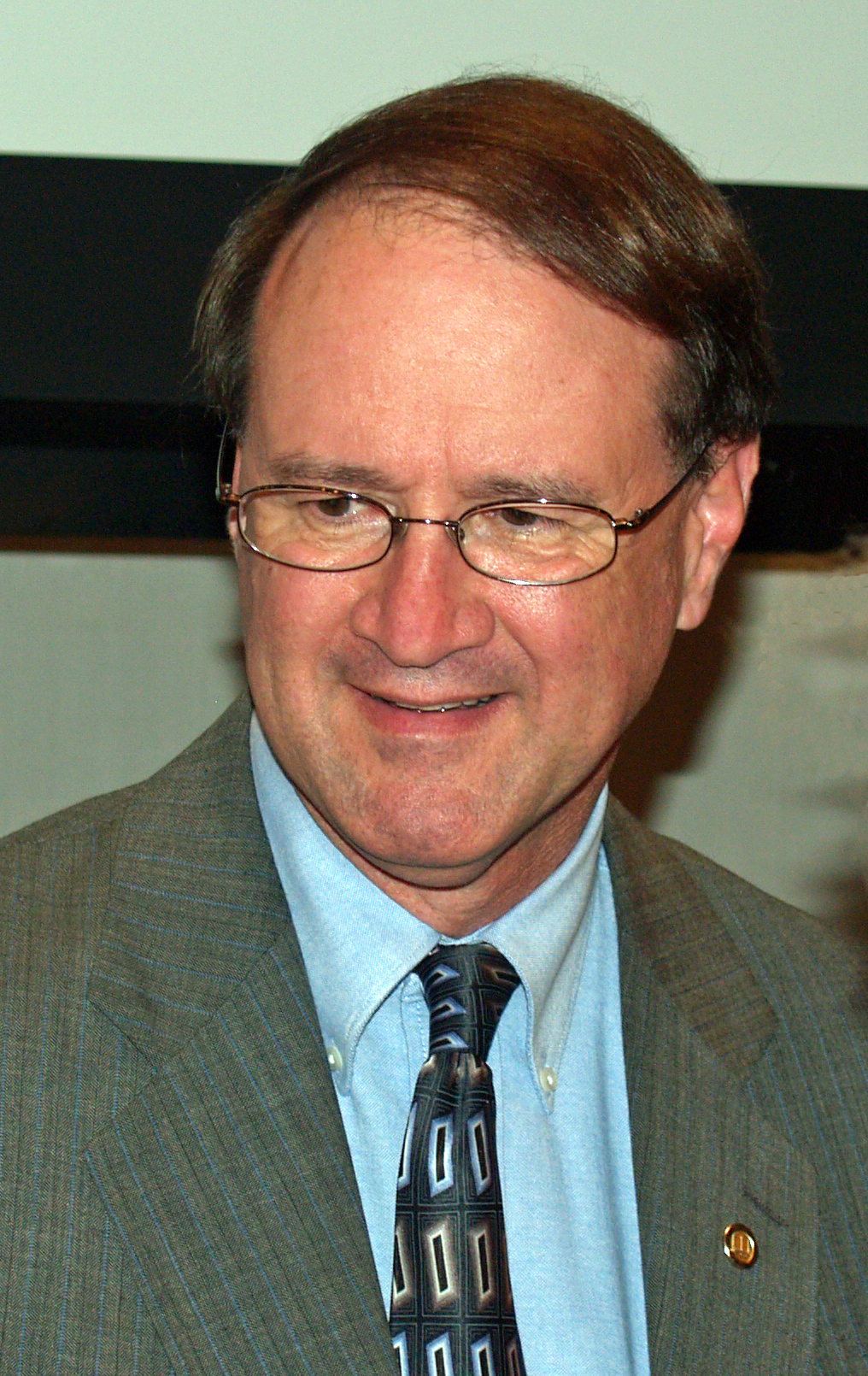
- Jim Rettig in 2008

President of the American Library Association
- In office 2008–2009
- Preceded by: Loriene Roy
- Succeeded by: Camila A. Alire

Personal details
- Born: November 11, 1950
- Died: August 17, 2022 (aged 71)
- Education: Marquette University; University of Wisconsin-Madison
- Occupation: Librarian
- Nickname: Jim Rettig

James R. Rettig (November 11, 1950 – August 17, 2022) was an American librarian and educator. He served as dean of libraries at the United States Naval Academy and as president of the American Library Association, the largest and oldest library association in the world.

== Life and career ==
Rettig graduated with bachelor's and master's degrees in English from Marquette University and a master's in library science from the University of Wisconsin-Madison in 1975. He worked in leadership and public service at the College of William and Mary, the University of Illinois at Chicago, the University of Dayton and Murray State University. Rettig served as the university librarian at the University of Richmond from 1998 to 2012. He subsequently served as dean of libraries at the United States Naval Academy until his retirement in 2017.

Rettig served as president of the American Library Association from 2008 to 2009. He also served as president of the Reference and User Services Association, served on the ALA Executive Board and the ALA Council, and chaired the ALA Committee on Organization and the ALA Publishing Committee.

== Awards and honors ==
- Distinguished Alumnus Award from the University of Wisconsin-Madison School of Library and Information Studies
- G.K. Hall Award for Library Literature
- Mudge Citation and Shores-Oryx Press Award from the Reference and User Services Association
- Online magazine's author award

== Selected publications ==
- Rettig, James (April 10–13, 2013). Counting, Counting, and More Counting… Let’s Begin the Countdown to Counting What Really Counts (PDF). ACRL 2013 Conference. Indianapolis, IN. pp. 126–136.
- Rettig, James (2004). "Art for Everyone's Sake". Virginia Libraries. 50 (3): 4–5. doi:10.21061/valib.v50i3.944.
- Rettig, James (2003). "Technology, cluelessness, anthropology, and the memex: the future of academic reference service". Reference Services Review. 31 (1): 17–21.
- Rettig, James (2002). "Old borders, new borders, bridges and new relationships: Transforming academic reference service". College & Research Libraries News. 63 (11): 790–793.
- Rettig, James. "Beyond 'Cool': Analog Models for Reviewing Digital Resources on the Web". Online. 20 (5): 52–54, 56, 58–62, 64.
- Rettig, James (1995). "The convergence of the twain or titanic collision? BI and reference in the 1990s' sea of change". Reference Services Review. 23 (1): 7–20.
- Rettig, James, ed. (1992). Distinguished Classics of Reference Publishing. Phoenix, Arizona: Oryx Press. ISBN 978-0-89774-640-3.
- Rettig, James (Winter 1992). "Self-determining information seekers". RQ. 32 (2): 158–163.
- Rettig, James, ed. (1987–1998). Bibliographic Guides in the Humanities. Libraries Unlimited.
- Miller, Constance; Rettig, James (Fall 1985). "Reference obsolescence". RQ. 25 (1): 52–58.

Non-profit organization positions
Preceded by Loriene Roy	President of the American Library Association; 2008–2009	Succeeded by Camila A. Alire
