= Loida Garcia-Febo =

Puerto Rican American librarian

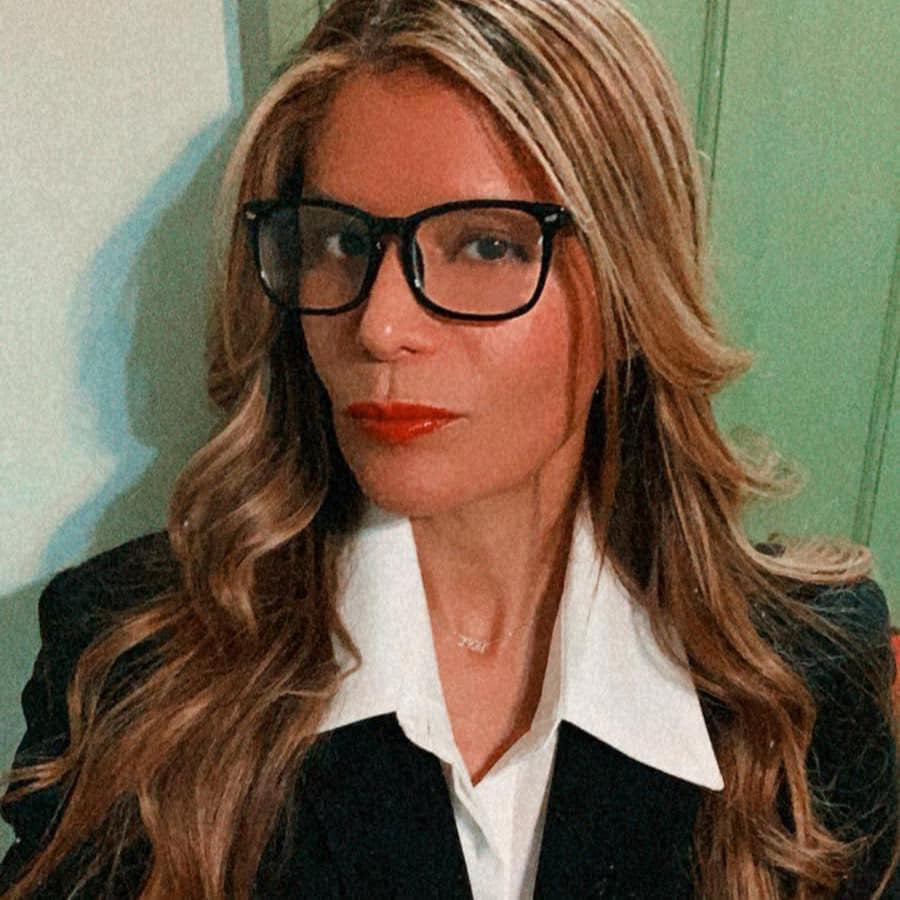

Past-President of the American Library Association
- In office 2018–2019
- Preceded by: James G. Neal
- Succeeded by: Wanda Kay Brown

Personal details
- Occupation: Librarian
- Committees: International Federation of Library Associations

Loida Garcia-Febo is a Puerto Rican American librarian and library consultant. Garcia-Febo served on the Governing Board of the International Federation of Library Associations (IFLA) 2013-2015 and 2015-2017. She was President of the American Library Association in 2018-2019 and member of its executive board from 2015-2020. She was president of the National Association to Promote Library and Information Services to Latinos and the Spanish Speaking (REFORMA) from 2009 to 2010.

== Career ==
Garcia-Febo has served as an elementary school librarian in Puerto Rico. She earned the Library degree at the Graduate School of Information Science and Technology (EGCTI), University of Puerto Rico.

She was a librarian at the Centro de Informacion (PRATP) of the Unidad de Servicios Bibliotecarios para Personas con Impedimentos (SBPI) de la Universidad de Puerto Rico, [University of Puerto Rico, Library Services for Persons with Disabilities’ Assistive Technology Information Center], Chief of the SBPI, and Manager at Queens Library.

She served on advisory boards, notably:

- Access to Learning Award Advisory Board for the Bill & Melinda Gates Foundation - Global Libraries.
- Library 2.0 advisory board for the San Jose State University School of Information.
- Library Advisory Board of Praeger an imprint of ABC-Clio.
- Public Libraries Advisory Committee

In 2009-2010 Garcia-Febo was president of REFORMA, the National Association to Promote Library and Information Services to Latinos and the Spanish-Speaking, and served on the board from 2008 to 2011.

Garcia-Febo was the President of Information New Wave, an international charity seeking to enhance the education of minority groups in the US and in developing countries.

=== American Library Association ===
Garcia-Febo was elected president of the American Library Association for 2018–2019. She made a national tour of libraries during her presidential term leading the "Libraries = Strong Communities" national advocacy initiative. She represented the American Library Association at "Generation Code: Born in the Library" interactive exhibition presenting to the members of the European Parliament.

She was elected to the board of trustees for the Freedom to Read Foundation in June 2020.

She chairs the American Library Association Task Force on United Nations 2030 Sustainable Development Goals.

=== International Federation of Library Associations and Institutions ===
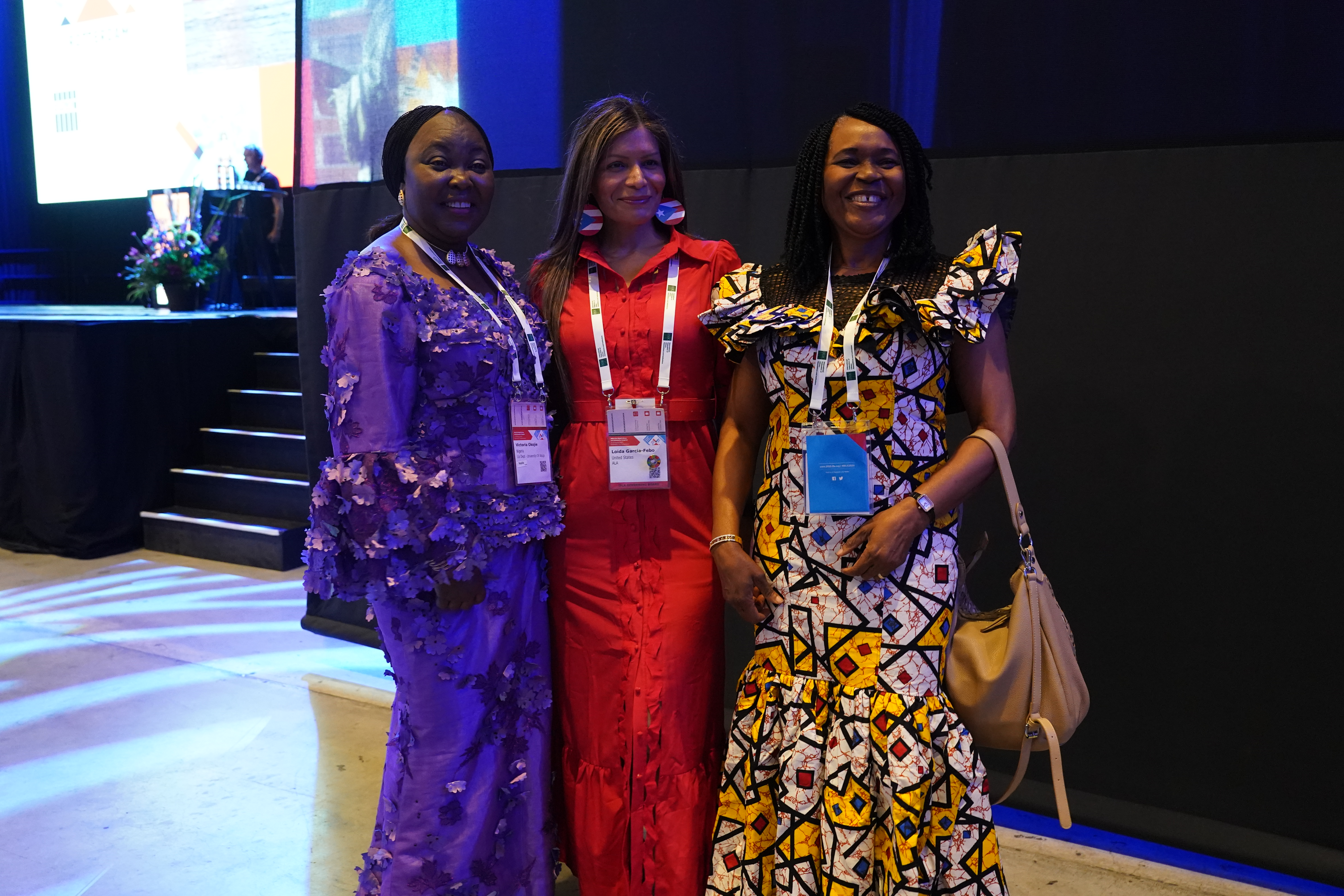
IFLA World Library and Information Congress 2023 The Hague, The Netherlands

Garcia-Febo's involvement with the International Federation of Library Associations and Institutions has included:

- Co-founder of the IFLA New Professionals SIG (Special Interest Group), an international forum for library and information services students and newly qualified librarians.
- Speaker at the United Nations Development Programme Meeting on Data Accountability for the Post-2015 Development Agenda in New York.
- Chair of the IFLA Management of Library Associations Section (MLAS) 2023-2025, and re-elected 2025-2027 also serving ex officio member of the IFLA Governing Board-- the first Latina and ALA Past President to serve in this capacity.
- IFLA Delegation Member to the United Nations High Level Political Forum (HLPF)
- Speaker."Libraries as Spaces of Hope and Belonging". IFLA WLIC 2026 Programme. International Federation of Library Associations and Institutions.

== Works ==
- Garcia-Febo, Loida (2026-07-09). "Interpersonal Skills and Office Politics: Building and Maintaining Positive Relationships with Colleagues". In Keppler, Nay (ed.). Librarianship Beyond the Textbook: A Practical Guide for Real-World Challenges. Bloomsbury Libraries Unlimited. ISBN 979-8-2164-5391-8.
- Garcia-Febo, Loida (3 August 2026). "The History and Strategic Role of the Management of Library Associations Section (MLAS): Building Strong Library Associations in an Era of Global – Transformation An Institutional History of MLAS, 1983–2026". IFLA Repository. International Federation of Library Associations and Institutions.
- Garcia-Febo, Loida; Tammaro, Anna Maria (2026). "Libraries as proactive agents in the age of artificial intelligence (AI): an interview with Loida Garcia Febo". Digital Library Perspectives. 42 (2). Emerald Publishing: 413–420. doi:10.1108/DLP-05-2026-267.
- Garcia-Febo, Loida (1 May 2019). "Supporting Our Agenda: Promoting greater community participation through collaboration". American Libraries. Vol. 50, no. 5. Chicago, Ill. pp. 4–5.
- Garcia-Febo, L. 2016. Working together: access to information and our power to cause change. Paper presented at: IFLA WLIC 2016 – Columbus, OH.
- Garcia-Febo, L. 2015. “La privacidad y la proteccion de datos.” In Analysis sobre tendencias de informacion propuestas por la IFLA. Mexico: UNAM, 2015.
- Garcia-Febo, L. 2013. Fundamental Freedoms, Library Services and Multi-Lingual Populations. Special Issue of Indiana Libraries: Intellectual Freedom & Censorship 32 (1): 45–46.
- Garcia-Febo, L. and R. Kear. 2012. “Worldwide Perceptions of New Librarians.” In Wolf-Fritz Riekert and Ingeborg Simon (Eds.), Information in e-motion Proceedings BOBCATSSS 2012 – 20th International Conference on Information Science. Amsterdam, 23–25 January 2012. Bad Honnef, Germany: Bock+Herchen Verlag, p. 122-125.
- Martínez Arellano, F. F. and L. Garcia-Febo. (eds.). 2011. Servicios bibliotecarios en America Latina: tres casos prominentes = Library services in Latin American: three outstanding cases. México UNAM, Centro Universitario de Investigaciones Bibliotecológicas : Federación Internacional de Asociaciones e Instituciones Bibliotecarias para America Latina y el Caribe.
- Garcia-Febo, L. 2011. “ALA, IFLA and their relationship with Latin America.” In John Ayala and Sal Guerena (Eds.), Pathways to Progress: Issues and Advances in Latino Librarianship. California: Libraries Unlimited.

== Awards ==
- 2024 ALA Medal of Excellence
- 2015 REFORMA Elizabeth Martinez Lifetime Achievement Award
- Notable Member on ALA's International Relations Round Table
- 2010 Elizabeth Futas Catalyst for Change Award
- 2007 Library Journal Mover & Shaker Freedom Fighter
- 2004 ALA/IFLA Fellowship for the 2004 IFLA Congress where she co-founded the IFLA New Professionals

Non-profit organization positions
Preceded by James G. Neal	President of the American Library Association; 2018–2019	Incumbent
