= Courtney Young (librarian) =

American librarian

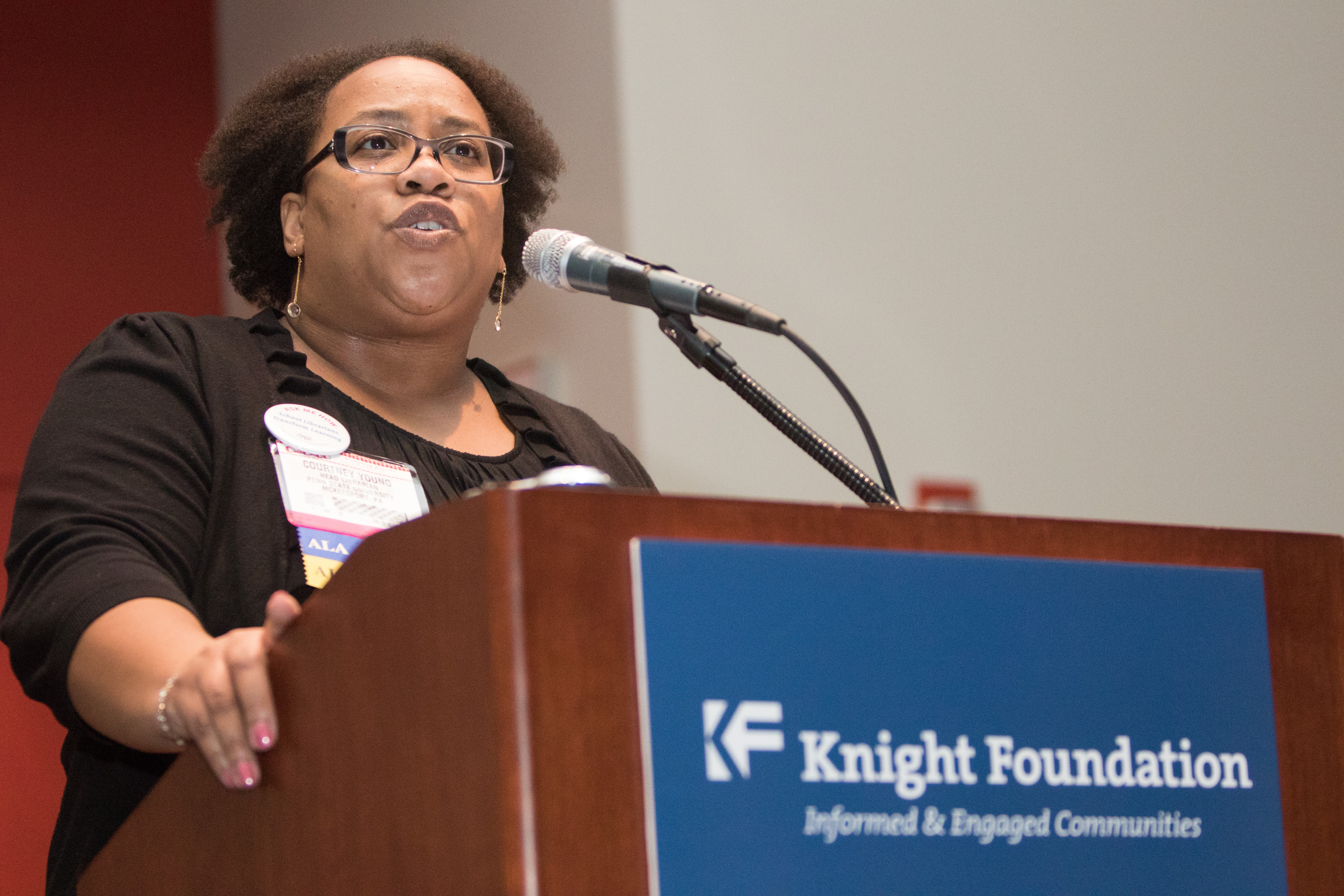
- Young at ALA Midwinter 2015

President of the American Library Association
- In office 2014–2015
- Preceded by: Barbara Stripling
- Succeeded by: Sari Feldman

Personal details
- Education: The College of Wooster; Simmons College
- Occupation: Librarian
- Website: courtneyyoung.org

Courtney Young is an American librarian and scholar, who served as the president of the American Library Association for the 2014–2015 year. On June 30, 2015, her term as ALA President ended, and she passed the title on to Sari Feldman.

== Education and career ==
Young received a BA in English from The College of Wooster in 1996, and an MLS from Simmons College the following year. She currently serves as University Librarian at Colgate University. Young was previously the Head Librarian and Professor of Women's Studies at Pennsylvania State University, Greater Allegheny campus. Young has previously worked at other campuses of Penn State, as well as at Michigan State University and Ohio State University.

== Honors and committee work ==
Young was a 2011 Library Journal Mover & Shaker – Change Agent. She was honored for her work to highlight issues of diversity in libraries and academia.

Additionally, Young has served as a member for several ALA boards and roundtables, including the ALA Executive Board, New Member's Round Table, ALA Resolutions Committee and the ALA Task Force on Electronic Member Participation.

== ALA presidency ==
Young was inaugurated as president of the American Library Association at the 2014 ALA Annual Conference in Las Vegas. She served as president until the conclusion of the 2015 ALA Annual Conference in San Francisco, when President-elect Sari Feldman was sworn in as president.

During her tenure as president, Young continued her work with ALA's Special Presidential Task Force on Equity, Diversity, and Inclusion. She also supported a new Career Development Facilitator program from ALA's Office for Human Resource Development and Recruitment. Additionally, Young has used her presidency to provide resources to help the ALA bolster its social media presence.

In 2024 Young was named chair of the American Library Association's 150th anniversary commemoration.

== Publications ==
- Young, Courtney. “Collaboration as a Key Component of Library Service: A Presidential Perspective.” Collaborative librarianship 6.3 (2014): 121–123
- Young C, Diaz K. "E-reference: incorporating electronic publications into reference". Library Hi Tech Journal [serial online]. March 1999;17(1):55–62. Available from: Library, Information Science & Technology Abstracts, Ipswich, MA. Accessed January 11, 2016.

Non-profit organization positions
Preceded by Barbara Stripling	President of the American Library Association; 2014–2015	Succeeded by Sari Feldman
