= Frank Moretti =

Frank Anthony Moretti (1943–2013) was a Professor of Communications, Computing, and Technology at Teachers College, Columbia University and visiting professor in the Columbia University School of Journalism.

He was a researcher in the area of new media teaching and learning and the use of digital technology in education, as well as co-founder and Executive Director of the Columbia Center for New Media Teaching and Learning. He earned a Ph.D. in History and an M. Phil from Columbia University, an M.Ed. from Teachers College and a B.A. in Greek and Latin from St. Bonaventure University. Moretti's 1983 dissertation was entitled "Augustus and Vergil: Pietas and the Pedagogy of Power". In 2012, Moretti published a work on the communications theorist James W. Carey, co-authored by Annie Rudd, entitled "James W. Carey: Sentinel of Democracy".

== Early life and education ==
From his birth late in 1943 through high school, Frank A. Moretti lived in [West New York, New Jersey]]. After high school, he went to St. Bonaventure University, where he majored in Classics, graduating in 1965.

Moretti had a love of teaching and maintained a continuous presence in one or another classroom. In 1966 he started as an instructor in Greek and Latin at St. Peter's Preparatory School in Jersey City. He worked as an instructor at St. Bonaventure and Adelphi University. In 1966, he had entered graduate school in classics at Columbia, shifting in the fall of 1968 to a Ph.D. program in the history of education at Teachers College.

== Career ==
Moretti became an independent teacher and a professional student. He amassed a succession of productive opportunities in his career, among them at Barnard College (1970–73), at Bloomfield College (1973–75), in a variety of instructional/administrative roles at the NYU School of Continuing Education (1971-1994), through diverse courses at Teachers College, Columbia University (1981-2013), as assistant and associate headmaster at the Dalton School (1981-1997), and finally as executive director of the Columbia Center for New Media Teaching and Learning (1999-2013).

Moretti was also President of the Black Rock Forest Consortium, an alliance of colleges and universities, public and independent schools, and leading scientific and cultural institutions that promotes scientific research, education, and conservation in Black Rock Forest. He worked with William T. Golden to help create the Consortium, and served as Board President from 1994 - 2013. Black Rock Forest later dedicated the Moretti Outpost and Moretti Education Center in his honor.

Moretti's output as an academic writer was small. He began a dissertation on Augustus and Vergil in 1973 and defended it in 1983. He read literary and scholarly works daily and annotated them extensively. He also worked as an administrator. Beyond his academic writing, he left correspondence, lecture notes, memos, and other material documenting his work.
