= Columbia Center for New Media Teaching and Learning =

Columbia Center for New Media Teaching & Learning
- Motto: Purposeful use of technology in education
- Founders: Frank A. Moretti, A. Maurice Matiz,
- Established: March 1, 1999
- Owner: Columbia University
- Location: New York, New York
- Website: ccnmtl.columbia.edu
- Dissolved: July 1, 2015

The Columbia Center for New Media Teaching and Learning (CCNMTL) was established on March 1, 1999, under the Provost Office at Columbia University. The mission of the Center was to enhance teaching and learning through the purposeful use of technology and new media. CCNMTL staff worked closely with faculty partners to provide support ranging from the construction of course websites to the development of elaborate custom-made projects. CCNMTL used the design research methodology, an iterative cycle of discovery, design, development, implementation, and evaluation. CCNMTL was part of Columbia's Information Services Division, which included the Columbia University Library System.

== History ==
In 1998, a Columbia University Task Force representing a broad cross-section of junior and senior faculty and administrators produced a platform of seven far-reaching recommendations embodied in a strategic-planning document of May 1998, entitled “Implications of New Media Technologies for Columbia's Educational Programs.” The Task Force recommended that the University provide incentives to encourage a larger number of faculty members to adopt at least some level of new technology in their teaching. The Task Force committed itself to the notion that any viable program fostering the integration of informational technology must be structured in such a way that the value of risk-taking would be clearly evident and occasional failures would be viewed as opportunities for future success. In this regard, it was deemed to be of the utmost importance that a means to achieve broad implementation of digital technologies be found. The Task Force unanimously agreed upon and mandated that the University create a service, support, and development group to provide assistance and advice in matters of digital and communications technology and new media to Columbia University's faculty and instructional staff.

In collaboration with faculty, this new group would help to create innovative pedagogical approaches to course content through the use of advanced technologies that would significantly alter and enhance various instructional environments. The same organization would serve as the campus hub for technology initiatives as they relate to the classroom. Activities would entail developing means to augment academic quality and learning environments at Columbia University. Hence, the Task Force gave its wholehearted endorsement of what was to become the Columbia Center for New Media Teaching and Learning (CCNMTL) as a collaborative effort building on the success of Academic Information Systems (AcIS) and the Institute for Learning Technologies (ILT). CCNMTL, rooted in the pedagogy developed by ILT, is buttressed by the superior network and computer systems provided by AcIS. Thus, the University's intention to combine inventiveness and the efficacious use of advanced instructional technologies and their broad dissemination was realized in CCNMTL.

== Leadership ==
The Columbia Center for New Media Teaching and Learning, was led by co-founders Frank Moretti and A. Maurice Matiz until Moretti's death in 2013. The group was then led by Matiz reporting to the University Librarian and Vice President for Information Services, James G. Neal. The University's Information Services Division also includes the Center for Digital Research and Scholarship.

== CCNMTL Services ==
CCNMTL's service philosophy is to provide the most supportive environment possible for Columbia University faculty who invest their time and energy in new media technologies for their courses. The Center's educational technologists have extensive pedagogical training and offer advice and direction to faculty who wish to discover and develop best practices in the educational uses of new media.

These efforts often lead to the creation of a course website that offers students convenient access to online course information, including custom content, selections from Columbia's Digital Library Collection, and communication tools. CCNMTL's educational technologists assist faculty and instructors interested in using CourseWorks, Columbia University's course management system, and Columbia Wikispaces, a service from Wikispaces.com that provides a wiki to every registered course at Columbia University. In 2008, CCNMTL also launched Columbia on iTunes U, which allowed Columbia students, faculty, and the public to download free lectures, seminars, and other Columbia-produced media content to mobile devices or personal computers via Apple's iTunes. Additionally, CCNMTL offers workshops for Columbia faculty and instructors who wish to explore uses of new media in teaching and learning.

== Sample Projects ==
While each of CCNMTL's projects pursues its own objectives, the unifying feature across these efforts is the innovative use of learning technologies and the high level of interaction among faculty and technologists as they share ideas and collaboratively design curricular resources and tools. Projects emphasize collaboration, interaction, and student activity.

Mapping the African American Past (MAAP) is a public Web site created to enhance the appreciation and study of significant sites and moments in the history of African Americans in New York from the early 17th-century through the recent past. The Web site is a geographic learning environment, enabling students, teachers, and visitors to browse a multitude of locations in New York and read encyclopedic profiles of historical people and events associated with these locations. The site is further enhanced by selected film and music clips; digitized photographs, documents, and maps from Columbia University's libraries; and commentary from Columbia faculty and other specialists. MAAP was the recipient of the 2009 Award for Innovative Use of Archives from the Archivists Round Table of Metropolitan New York.

Millennium Village Simulation is a Web-based simulation of economics and survival for one family and their village in a sub-Saharan African village. In a virtual world of extreme poverty, disease, and environmental variability, students are challenged to help a family of two survive and prosper over a fifty-year period. By making decisions regarding the family's allocation of time and financial resources, students develop a greater understanding of the manifold disciplines—such as agronomy, nutrition, economics, epidemiology, public health and development management—that constitute sustainable development and how those disciplines interact with each other in "real world" scenarios.

The Civil War and Reconstruction - Online Course with Eric Foner introduces students to the most pivotal era in American history. The Civil War transformed the nation by eliminating the threat of secession and destroying the institution of slavery. It raised questions that remain central to our understanding of ourselves as a people and a nation – the balance of power between local and national authority, the boundaries of citizenship, and the meanings of freedom and equality. The three-part series will examine the causes of the war, the road to secession, the conduct of the Civil War, the coming of emancipation, and the struggle after the war to breathe meaning into the promise of freedom for four million emancipated slaves. One theme throughout the series is what might be called the politics of history – how the world in which a historian lives affects his or her view of the past, and how historical interpretations reinforce or challenge the social order of the present.
