= Sari Feldman =

American librarian

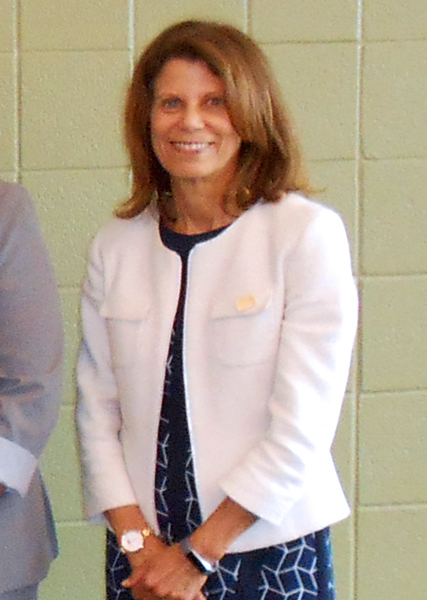

President of the American Library Association
- In office 2015–2016
- Preceded by: Courtney Young
- Succeeded by: Julie Todaro

Personal details
- Born: South Fallsburg, New York
- Education: State University of New York; University of Wisconsin
- Occupation: Librarian

Sari Feldman is an American librarian who served as president of the American Library Association (ALA) from 2015 to 2016. During her presidency, she launched the Libraries Transform public awareness campaign that increased funding support for libraries and sought to advance information policy.

== Education and career ==
Sari Feldman received a master's degree in Library Science from the University of Wisconsin in 1977 and a bachelor's in English from State University of New York at Binghamton. While in graduate school, Feldman became a jail librarian at Dane County, Wisconsin Correctional Facility.

Since 1984, she has served as an adjunct faculty member at the School of Information Studies, Syracuse University, in New York, teaching graduate courses in library management, reference services, policy and grant writing.

She made her way to Ohio in 1997 and became head of community services at the Cleveland Public Library and later became deputy director. She served as president of the Public Library Association from 2009 to 2010 and numerous other boards and committees as a long-lasting ALA member

Feldman was executive director of Cuyahoga County Public Library from May, 2003 to August 2, 2019.

== Committee work ==
Feldman has been a member of ALA since 1990 and has served on several boards and committees.

- Co-chair of the ALA Digital Content and Libraries Working Group – 2011 to 2014
- President of the Public Library Association (PLA) – 2009 to 2010
- Chair of the ALA Office of Literacy/Outreach Services Advisory Committee – 2000 to 2003
- Chair of the Urban Libraries Council Urban Youth Strategy Group – 2005 to 2006
- Member of the PLA Every Child Ready to Read Task Force – 2007 to 2008
- Member of PLA Pre-School Literacy Task Force – 2001 to 2005
- Founding Member and Trustee of OneCommunity – 2003 to Present
- Board Member of In Counsel with Women – 2003 to Present

== Honors ==
- "Alumna/Alumnus Award Winners". University of Wisconsin–Madison School of Library and Information Studies. University of Wisconsin–Madison.
- PLA Charlie Robinson Award (2013)
- Crain's Cleveland Business Women of Note Award (2011)
- USA Toy Library Association Player of the Year (2008)
- YMCA Woman of Achievement (2005)
- Leadership Academy's Community Impact Award (2002)
- Syracuse University Vice President's Award for Teacher of the Year (1995)
- ALA Loleta D. Fyan Grant (1994)

== Publications ==
=== Books ===
- Feinberg, S., Kuchner, J. F., & Feldman, S. (1998). Learning environments for young children: Rethinking library spaces and services. Chicago: American Library Association.

=== Articles ===
- McClure, C. R., Feldman, S., & Ryan, J. (2007). Politics and advocacy: The role of networking in selling the library to your community. Public Library Quarterly, 25(1), 137–154. doi:10.1300/J118v25n01_10
- Feldman, S., & Gonick, L. (2005). The dream of One Cleveland. Library Journal, 130(14), 34.
- Feldman, S. (2015, September 29). Celebrate the Freedom to Read. Huffington Post.

Non-profit organization positions
Preceded by Courtney Young	President of the American Library Association; 2015–2016	Succeeded by Julie Todaro
