= Maureen Sullivan (librarian) =

American librarian, educator and organizational consultant

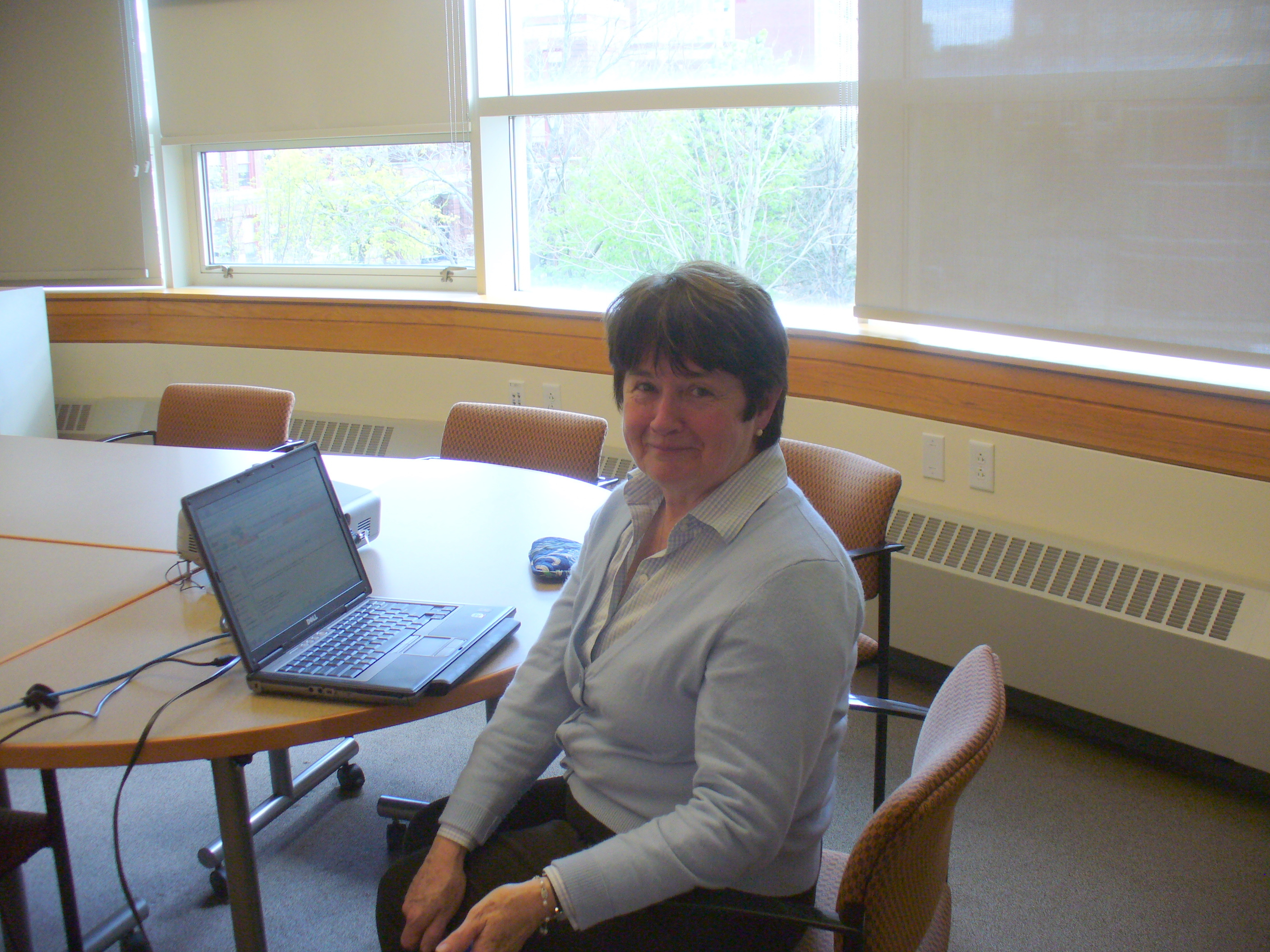

President of the American Library Association
- In office 2012–2013
- Preceded by: Molly Raphael
- Succeeded by: Barbara Stripling

Personal details
- Education: University of Maryland
- Occupation: Librarian; educator

Maureen Sullivan is an American librarian, educator, and organizational consultant who served as the president of the American Library Association from 2012 to 2013.

== Education and career ==
Sullivan grew up in Norwich, Connecticut, and attended the Norwich Free Academy. She received her Bachelor of Arts from the University of Maryland in 1974 and a Master of Library Science degree from the University of Maryland in 1976.

She has been a professor of practice in the Simmons College Graduate School of Library and Information Science doctoral program since 2006; she also was the interim dean of the school from January to June 2013.

== Library leadership ==
Sullivan served as the president of the Association of College and Research Libraries from 1998 to 1999. During her ACRL presidency, Sullivan successfully proposed the formation of the Leadership Institute for Academic Librarians at the Harvard Graduate School of Education; she also helped develop the curriculum and served as faculty for the program.

Sullivan began her one-year term as president of the American Library Association in 2012. During her time as president of ALA, one of Sullivan's main focuses was developing a training programs for community engagement that partnered with the Harwood Institute for Public Innovation. She also helped launch an association-wide effort ("Reimagining ALA") to help libraries face the challenges of the digital age.

Sullivan has over thirty years of experience as a consultant on topics such as organization development, strategic planning, and leadership development. She has designed and facilitated many leadership development programs for individual libraries and library associations, including the New England Library Leadership Symposium and the Maryland Library Leaders Institute. Along with her husband Jack Siggins, Sullivan has facilitated the TALL Texas Leadership Development Institute for over twenty years.

== Professional recognition ==
Sullivan was named the 2010 Academic/Research Librarian of the Year by the Association of College and Research Libraries. The University of Maryland College of Information Studies named her their 2013 alumnus of the year, describing her as "a widely recognized leader and educator in the library profession." In 2016, she was awarded the Joseph W. Lippincott Award by the American Library Association.

In 2022 Sullivan was awarded American Library Association Honorary Membership.

Non-profit organization positions
Preceded by Molly Raphael	President of the American Library Association; 2012–2013	Succeeded by Barbara Stripling
