= Molly Raphael =

American librarian

President of the American Library Association
- In office 2011–2012
- Preceded by: Roberta A. Stevens
- Succeeded by: Maureen Sullivan

Personal details
- Occupation: Librarian

Molly Horst Raphael is an American librarian. From 2011 to 2012, she was president of the American Library Association.

== Education and career ==
She graduated from Oberlin College, and Simmons College.

Raphael's 33 years at the District of Columbia Public Library (DCPL) began as a youth librarian and culminated in her appointment as Library Director in 1997. She was president of the District of Columbia Library Association in 1987-88.

In 2003, Raphael was recruited to lead the award-winning Multnomah County Library (MCL) in Portland, Oregon. She retired from Multnomah County Public Library in May 2009.

== American Library Association ==
Raphael held many roles in the American Library Association including president of the Library Leadership and Management Association (LLAMA), Councilor at Large, Executive Board, Budget Analysis and Review Committee, and Committee on Professional Ethics. She also served on the Freedom to Read Foundation Board of Directors.

She was elected president of the American Library Association in 2011. Her presidential initiative was "Empowering Voices, Transforming Communities."

Non-profit organization positions
Preceded by Roberta A. Stevens	President of the American Library Association; 2011–2012	Succeeded by Maureen Sullivan
