= John N. Berry =

American librarian and magazine editor (1933–2020)

John N. Berry III
- Born: June 12, 1933; Montclair, New Jersey, US
- Died: October 10, 2020 (aged 87)
- Education: Simmons University (MLIS), Boston University (BA)
- Occupations: Journal editor, writer
- Employer: Library Journal
- Known for: Provocative editorials on librarianship

John Nichols Berry III (June 12, 1933 – October 10, 2020) was an American librarian who was an editor at Library Journal for over fifty years. He died on October 10, 2020, at age 87. Berry began working at Library Journal in 1964, becoming editor-in-chief in 1969, succeeding Eric Moon. He retired in 2006, but continued to write his column Blatant Berry, in which he advocated for progressive library values. Prior to coming to Library Journal, Berry was editor of the Massachusetts Library Association publication Bay State Librarian, which won the H. W. Wilson Library Periodical Award.

Berry received the Joseph W. Lippincott Award for distinguished service to librarianship. He taught library science at many graduate schools, including the University of Pittsburgh, Dominican University, Simmons College, and Louisiana State University, and he was active in the American Library Association's Social Responsibilities Round Table. The Association for Library and Information Science Education awarded him the Service to ALISE Award in 1993.

== Early life and education ==
Berry was born to Mr. and Mrs. John N. Berry Jr. in Montclair NJ. He received a BA from Boston University and an MLS from Simmons College.

Berry was married to Louise (née Parker) Berry, director of Connecticut's Darien Public Library for 35 years until her retirement. The couple had one child, and he had two from a previous marriage.

== Library Journal ==
Berry wrote many articles and columns for Library Journal. The tribute, "Remembering John N. Berry III", which appeared in Library Journal after his death includes many accolades for his writing, mentoring, and teaching.

A few citations from his many writings are listed below:

- "Equity & Education for All". 2019.
- "Of, By, and For the People". 2018.
- "To calm the angry or argumentative: Take on "the Burden." 2017.
- "Eric Moon dies at 93." 2016.
- "Courage in Crisis."2015.

Berry captured the changes in policies and practices of U.S. libraries as they moved from paper to digital. He identified political forces that influenced the national library infrastructure from the White House Conferences on Libraries and Information Services to the National Commission on Libraries and Information Science (1970–2008) to the Institute of Museum and Library Services.
