= Center for Digital Research and Scholarship =

The Center for Digital Research and Scholarship (CDRS) at Columbia University was a unit of the University Libraries that partnered with researchers and scholars at Columbia to share their research broadly with the world. Using innovative new media and digital technologies, CDRS sought to empower the Columbia research community with online tools and services to enable them to make the most of scholarly communication, collaboration, data sharing, and preservation. CDRS was part of Columbia University Libraries/Information Services (CUL/IS).

== History ==
CDRS was created by James G. Neal in 2007 as part of the reorganization of the Columbia libraries that consolidated the technology-focused divisions (the Columbia Center for New Media Teaching and Learning, Libraries Digital Program Division, Library Information Technology Office, and the Preservation and Digital Conversion Division) and that also including the establishing of the Copyright Advisory Office. Its founding director was Rebecca Kennison.

== Services and Projects ==
CDRS’ portfolio included support for a range of services and project.

=== Academic Commons ===
Now a part of the Libraries' Open Scholarship unit (formerly Digital Scholarship), Columbia University's institutional repository, called Academic Commons, showcases the research output of Columbia University and enhances the visibility of this work through indexing by search engines, including Google Scholar. Academic Commons guarantees long-term preservation of files. As an open-access repository, Academic Commons’ contents are universally accessible.

Storing work in Academic Commons help researchers meet deposit, archiving, and dissemination stipulations for federal and private funding requirements, such as those by the National Institutes of Health or the National Science Foundation — and also provides participants with secure, long-term preservation for many digital file types.

Academic Commons supports the deposit of a variety of types of content: articles, conference papers, datasets, dissertations, monographs, multimedia creations, pre- and post-prints, technical reports, theses, videos, working papers, etc.

=== Conference Services ===
CDRS offered hosting and Web site support for Columbia-based scholarly events by installing and training conference organizers on Open Conference Systems platform. An in-house video team captures many of Columbia's academic events on digital video, shoots interviews, digitizes offline audio and video resources, and creates training videos and mini-documentaries.

=== Publication Services ===
==== Columbia-Based Journals ====
CDRS provided journal hosting support services to Columbia faculty and students who are involved in publishing an online journal. Services offered by CDRS included advice on the digitization of print back issues; platform software hosting, updates, and enhancements; integration of interactive elements such as blogs and wikis; and copyright consulting. CDRS used WordPress and Open Journal Systems as their primary platforms. Most of their journals were law reviews, including the Columbia Business Law Review.

==== Monographs and Publishing Partnerships ====
CDRS provided support for traditional and new publishing models by working with Columbia-based authors and their editors at university presses and academic publishers to create enhanced digital publications of their print books. One prize-winning project was Dangerous Citizens Online, a book by anthropology professor Neni Panourgiá developed jointly with Fordham University Press.

=== Wikischolars ===
CDRS also supported research collaboration by managing a wiki platform called Wikischolars, hosted by Wikispaces.

=== Scholarly Communication Program ===
Columbia's Scholarly Communication Program was operated by CDRS’ staff. Founded in 2008, the program's aim is to provide education about issues of importance within scholarly communication. Among other activities, the program presents a speaker series called Research Without Borders.

== See also ==
- Library publishing
