= Elisabeth Long =

U.S. librarian, book artist, and academic administrator

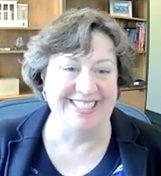
- Long in 2023

Academic background
- Education: St. John's College; University of Maryland, College Park; Columbia College Chicago

Academic work
- Discipline: Library sciences, book art
- Institutions: University of Chicago Library; Johns Hopkins University

Elisabeth M. Long is an American librarian, book artist, and academic administrator serving as the Sheridan dean of university libraries, archives, and museums at Johns Hopkins University since 2023. From 2021 to 2022, she served as the interim library director and university librarian of the University of Chicago Library.

== Early life and education ==
Long's family moved to Baltimore when she was nine years old. She attended the Bryn Mawr School.

Long earned a B.A. from St. John's College in 1986. She completed a Master of Library and Information Science from the University of Maryland, College Park in 1993. In 2018 she was accepted into the prestigious Association of Research Libraries Leadership Fellows program. She attended Columbia Colleges Rare Book School in 1993, and earned a M.F.A. in book and paper arts in 2006 from the Columbia College Chicago.

== Career ==
Long joined the University of Chicago Library in 1998. In 2016, she was promoted to associate university librarian for information technology and digital scholarship. From 2018 to 2019, she was a leadership fellow of the Association of Research Libraries. From December 1, 2021, to April 21, 2022, Long served as the interim library director and university librarian, succeeding Brenda Johnson.

On January 3, 2023, Long succeeded Winston Tabb as dean of the Sheridan Libraries & University Museums at Johns Hopkins University. She is a member of the Academic Preservation Trust (APTrust) governing board.

Long is a book artist and has a printing studio.

== Publications ==
- "A Single Portal to Chicago History: UChicago Library Partners with 21 Institutions to Create a Tool for Exploring the History and Culture of Chicago.” Libra. v. 20 [2015], p. 7.
- “From the Editor.” Openings: Studies in Book Art. v.1 [2012], pp. 2–3.
- “The SDSS and e-science archiving at the University of Chicago Library.” International Association of Scientific and Technological University Libraries 31st Annual Conference. Paper 9. Co-authored with Charles Blair, Elisabeth Long, Barbara Kern, et alia, June 2010.
- “The Hybrid Book.” Conference review for new Artists’ Books section in caa.reviews.
- “The Dream-Maker.” Little Bang. v. 1 [October 2008], pp. 51–56.
- “Chapbook Presses – Poet as Maker.” Journal of Artists’ Books. v. 24 [2008], pp. 44–45.
- “Book Reviews: Lift and Deciphering Human Chromosome 16.” Journal of Artists’ Books. v. 23 Spring [2008], pp. 45–46.
- “Conference Overview” and “On the Printing of the JAB Covers by the Side of Bubbly Creek.” Journal of Artists’ Books, v. 22 (2007), pp. 4–6 and 40.
- “Written Landscapes.” AfterImage. v. 34 n. 6 [May/June 2007], pp. 26–27.
- “Editioning One-of-a-Kind Multiples: Notes Toward An Understanding of Anselm Kiefer’s Books.” Journal of Artists’ Books, v. 21 (2007), pp. 14–16.
- “Recognizing Digitization as a Preservation Reformatting Method.” Microform & Imaging Review. v. 33 no. 4 [2007] pp. 171–180.
