= Roberta A. Stevens =

American librarian

President of the American Library Association
- In office 2010–2011
- Preceded by: Camila A. Alire
- Succeeded by: Molly Raphael

Personal details
- Occupation: Librarian

Roberta A. Stevens is an American librarian. From 2010 to 2011, she was president of the American Library Association.

== Life ==
She graduated from State University of New York at Buffalo, and State University of New York at Binghamton.

She worked at the Fairfax County Public Library, and the Library of Congress.

Non-profit organization positions
Preceded by Camila A. Alire	President of the American Library Association; 2010–2011	Succeeded by Molly Raphael
