= Julie Todaro =

American librarian

President of the American Library Association
- In office 2016–2017
- Preceded by: Sari Feldman
- Succeeded by: James G. Neal

Personal details
- Occupation: Librarian

Julie Todaro is an American librarian. She served as president of the American Library Association from 2016 to 2017.

== Career ==
Todaro currently serves as the Dean of Library Services at Austin Community College in Austin, Texas. She has been a member of the American Library Association since 1972.

She previously served as president of the Association of college and Research Libraries from 2007 to 2008, and of the Texas Library Association from 2000 to 2001.

== Selected publications ==
- Library Management for the Digital Age: A New Paradigm, Rowman and Littlefield, 2014
- Emergency Preparedness for Libraries, Government Institutes, 2009
- Training Library Staff and Volunteers to Provide Extraordinary Customer Service, Neal-Schuman, 2006 (co-author)

Non-profit organization positions
Preceded by Sari Feldman	President of the American Library Association; 2016–2017	Succeeded by James G. Neal
