= James G. Neal =

American library administrator

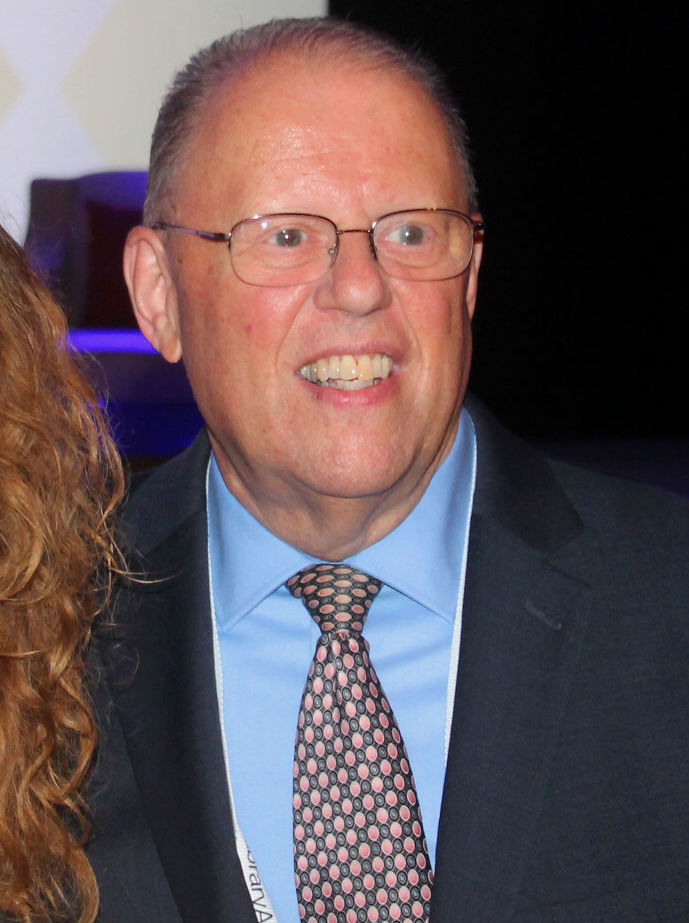
- Neal in 2018

President of the American Library Association
- In office 2017–2018
- Preceded by: Julie Todaro
- Succeeded by: Loida Garcia-Febo

Personal details
- Occupation: Librarian

James G. Neal is an American librarian, library administrator, and a prominent figure in American and international library associations. In 2022, President Joe Biden appointed him to the National Museum and Library Services Board which advises the agency on general policies with respect to the duties, powers, and authority of the Institute of Museum and Library Services relating to museum, library, and information services, as well as the annual selection of the National Medal for Museum and Library Service.

Neal, whose career dates back to at least 1973, when he was social sciences librarian at City College of New York's Queensborough Community College, is widely active in national and international forums in the areas of copyright and scholarly communication. From 2001 to 2014 he was Vice President for Information Services and University Librarian at Columbia University, and he now serves as University Librarian Emeritus. At the Columbia University Libraries, he focused on the development of the digital library, special collections, global resources, instructional technology, library facility construction and renovation, and electronic scholarship. Before taking up his position at Columbia, he was Dean of University Libraries at Indiana University and Johns Hopkins University and held administrative positions at Penn State's library, Notre Dame's library, and the City University of New York's library.

In 2007, Neal received the Hugh C. Atkinson Award from the Association of College and Research Libraries, In 2009, he was honored by the American Library Association with the Melvil Dewey Medal and in 2015 with the Joseph W. Lippincott Award. In April 2016, Neal was elected president of the American Library Association for 2017–2018.

== Columbia Librarian ==
The University Librarian at Columbia is charged with overseeing:

- Columbia's 25-library network.
- Columbia's Center for Digital Research and Scholarship.
- Columbia's Copyright Advisory Office.
- Columbia's Center for Human Rights Documentation and Research. He participates on key academic, technology, budget and policy groups at the university.

In addition, Neal participated in key academic, technology, budget and policy groups in the university. At Columbia, he has focused in particular on the development of the digital library, special collections, global resources, instructional technology, building construction/renovation, and fundraising programs.

== Columbia-Google digitization partnership ==
Neal was ultimately responsible for Columbia's participation in the Google Books Library Project, which involves a series of agreements between Google and major international libraries through which a collection of its public domain books will be scanned in their entirety and made available for free to the public online. Neal moderated the institutional debate about anticipated consequences inherent in conventional content-vs.-collection strategies; and sometimes he took on the role of public spokesman.

== Librarianship ==
Neal is a frequent speaker at national and international conferences, consultant and published author, with a focus in the areas of scholarly communication, intellectual property, digital library programs, organizational change and human resource development. He has worked on editorial boards of journals in the field of academic librarianship. He has represented the American library community in testimony on copyright matters before Congressional committees, was an advisor to the U.S. delegation at the World Intellectual Property Organization (WIPO) diplomatic conference on copyright, has worked on copyright policy and advisory groups for universities and for professional and higher education associations. In 2019, he was named a Senior Policy Fellow for the American Library Association to advise the Washington Office on Public Policy and Advocacy on licensing and copyright.

In 2022, Neal was elected to American Library Association Honorary Membership, its highest honor, for his "influential and wide-ranging role in the arena of information and public policy over four decades." In 2022, he was also honored with the L.Ray Patterson Award which recognizes an individual for supporting the Constitutional use of U.S. Copyright Law, fair use and the public domain

== Professional associations ==
- Association of College and Research Libraries (ACRL).
  - ACRL's Academic Librarian of the Year (1997).
  - ACRL, Scholarly Communication Committees.
  - ACRL's Hugh Atkinson Memorial Award (2007).
- American Council of Learned Societies (ACLS).
  - ACLS Advisory Board for the E-History Book Project.
- American Library Association (ALA), Council and Executive Board.
- Association of Research Libraries (ARL), Board and President.
  - ARL, Scholarly Communication committee.
- Columbia University Press (CUP), Board.
- Digital Preservation Network (DPN), Board.
- Freedom to Read Foundation, Board.
- International Federation of Library Associations and Institutions (IFLA).
- Metropolitan New York Library Council (METRO), Board and Treasurer.
- National Information Standards Organization (NISO), Board and Chair.
- National Institutes of Health (NIH), Advisory Board of PubMed Central.
- Online Computer Library Center (OCLC) Research Library Advisory Council, Board and Chair.
- Project MUSE, Board.
- Research Libraries Group (RLG), Board and Chair.
  - RLG Program Committee of the OCLC Board, Chair.
- Scholarly Publishing and Academic Resources Coalition (SPARC).
  - SPARC Steering Committee of SPARC, Chair.
- U.S. Copyright Office Section 108 Study Group (2005–2008).
- University of the People, Library Advisory Board.

== Published work ==
In addition to his own published work, Neal has worked on the editorial boards of journals in the field of academic librarianship.

- Neal, James G. (2006). "Raised By Wolves: integrating the new generation of feral professionals into the academic library." Library Journal. February 15, 2006.
- Neal, James G. (2004). "The ReCAP artifactual repository planning project". Library Collections, Acquisitions, and Technical Services. 28: 25–28. doi:10.1016/j.lcats.2003.11.004. S2CID 62143475.
- Neal, James G. (2006). "The Research and Development Imperative in the Academic Library: Path to the Future". Portal: Libraries and the Academy. 6: 1–3. doi:10.1353/pla.2006.0007. S2CID 62170016.
- Wilson, Lizabeth; Neal, James G.; Jordan, Jay (2006). "Guest Editorial: RLG and OCLC: Combining for the Future". Portal: Libraries and the Academy. 6 (4): 395. doi:10.1353/pla.2006.0061. S2CID 62137176.
- Neal, James G. (May 13–15, 1998). Research Library Leadership: Network Policy and Applications Development. The Future Network: Transforming Learning and Scholarship. Association of Research Libraries. pp. 103–11. Archived from the original on January 26, 2013.

== Sources ==
- "Testimony of James G. Neal Dean, University Libraries, Johns Hopkins University," Hearings on Distance Education Through Digital Technologies, U.S. Copyright Office, Library of Congress. January 26, 1999.
- Neal, James G. (2005). "The Library of the Future: An Information Technologist's Perspective," Space and Knowledge Conference (University of Chicago), November 17, 2005—video record of oral remarks.
- Riding, Alan. "France Detects a Cultural Threat in Google"(subscription required) New York Times. April 11, 2005.

Non-profit organization positions
Preceded by Julie Todaro	President of the American Library Association; 2017–2018	Succeeded by Loida Garcia-Febo
