= James F. Williams =

American librarian

James F. Williams II is a retired American librarian. He was the Dean of Libraries at the University of Colorado at Boulder from 1988–2017.

He holds a bachelor's degree in sociology from Morehouse College (1966) and a master's degree in library science from Atlanta University. His wife, Nancy Allen, is also a librarian, the Dean of Libraries at the University of Denver.

He is a former member of the editorial board of the journal Portal: Libraries and the Academy. He was on the board of directors of the Association of Research Libraries and chaired the ARL's Strategic Direction Steering Committee on Influencing Public Policies for 2010–2013. He is on the board of visitors for the School of Information Sciences at the University of Pittsburgh, and has been a member of the visiting committee for the libraries at the Massachusetts Institute of Technology. He is a member of the Libraries' National Council of Washington University in St. Louis, and a trustee of the Denver Art Museum.

In 2002, Williams won the Melvil Dewey Medal of the American Library Association for his "distinguished service to the profession of librarianship".

In 2017, Williams was honored by the Colorado Association of Libraries with their Career Achievement Award.

== Publications ==
- Strategic Planning in Higher Education: Implementing New Roles for the Academic Library
- Managing Diversity Library Management in Light of the Dismantling of Affirmative Action
- Leadership competencies and the importance of research methods and statistical analysis in decision making and research and publication: A study of citation patterns
- Leadership Evaluation and Assessment
- Collaboration between practitioners and teaching faculty: A study of research, publication, and citation patterns
