= Famous First Facts =

Book by Joseph Nathan Kane

- Author: Joseph Nathan Kane
- Language: English
- Genre: Non-fiction
- Publisher: H. W. Wilson Company
- Publication date: 1933
- ISBN: 978-1-61925-468-8

Famous first facts: a record of first happenings, discoveries, and inventions in American history is a book listing "First Happenings, Discoveries and Inventions in the United States". The book's seventh edition (ISBN 978-1-61925-468-8), published in March 2015 — includes more than 8,000 entries on 1,400 pages.

The book was originally published by H. W. Wilson Company in 1933, weighing in at 757 pages and selling for $3.50. The book was created by Joseph Nathan Kane, a freelance journalist who had assembled 3,000 "firsts" into a text that had been rejected by 11 other publishers before it was accepted by its current publisher. The book became a library reference standard.

The first edition led to a 1938–39 radio show hosted by Kane on the Mutual Broadcasting System.

The second edition of the book was published in 1950, the third in 1964, the fourth in 1981 and the fifth in 1997. The sixth edition (1,300 pages) was published in 2006, and the seventh edition (1,400 pages) was published in 2015.

A version focused on world history was published in 2000 (titled Famous first facts, international edition: a record of first happenings, discoveries, and inventions in world history).

== See also ==
- Notable Last Facts
- Steven Anzovin
