= National Library Week =

Observance week

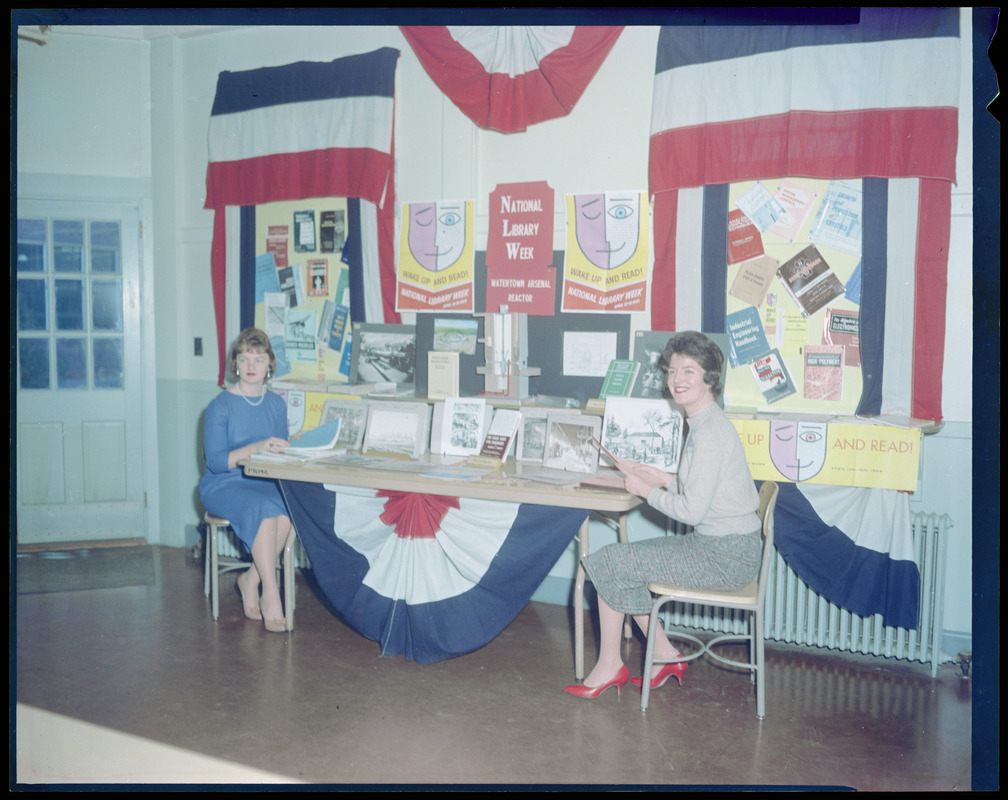
National Library Week at the Watertown Arsenal in 1959

National Library Week (sometimes known as Libraries Week) is observed by a number of countries, initially just by the United States (since 1957).

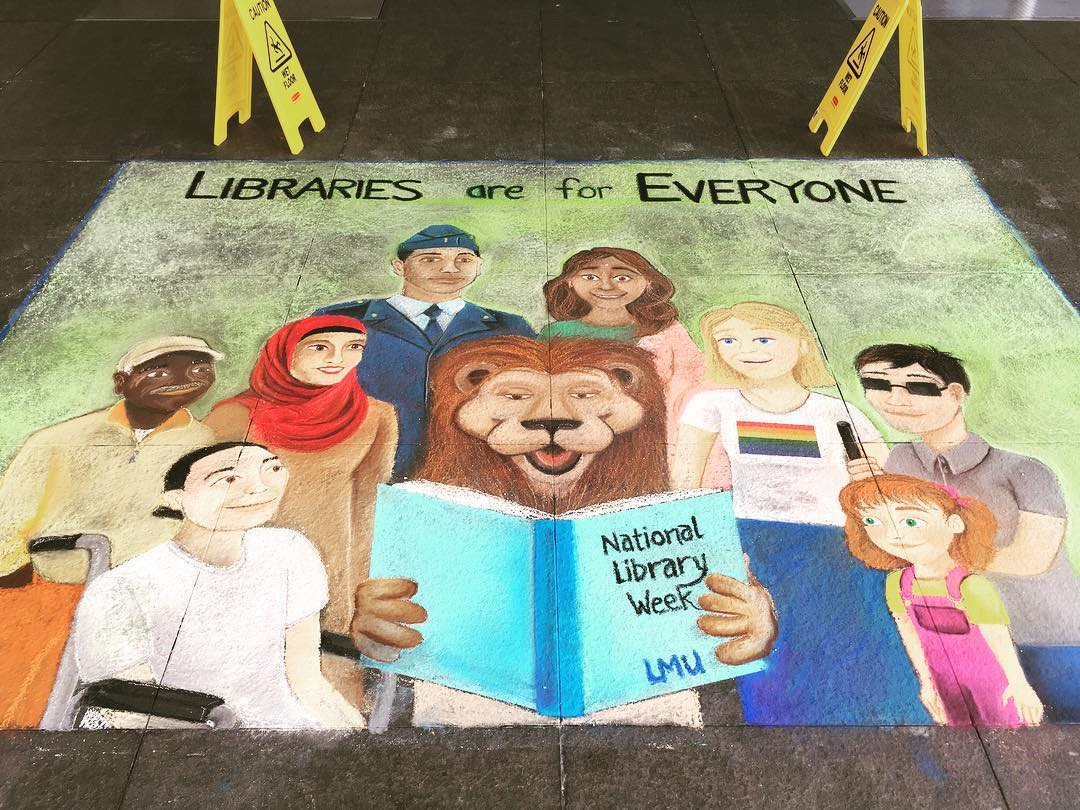
Artwork created for National Library Week at Loyola Marymount University, 2017.

First sponsored in 1958, National Library Week (NLW) as observed in the United States is sponsored by the American Library Association (ALA) and libraries across the USA each April, typically the second full week. It promotes library use and support.

In 1954, a nonprofit National Book Committee was established between the ALA and the American Book Publishers. Virginia Mathews served as Deputy Director and then Director of the National Book Committee. In 1957, the committee developed the idea for National Library Week, hoping that it would motivate people to read and support libraries.

In 1975 National Library Week moved to the American Library Association where it was coordinated by Peggy Barber.

National Library Week occurs in April which is School Library Month. National Library Workers Day (Tuesday of the week), National Bookmobile Day, and Support Teen Literature Day (Thursday of the week) all occur during National Library Week. Each year the week has a new theme. The theme of the first sponsored week in 1954 was "Wake Up and Read!" and 2021's theme is "There's More to the Story."

The honorary chair of National Library Week, April 3–9, 2022, was actress, comedian Molly Shannon. The American Library Association released the State of America's Libraries Report, highlighting the challenges U.S. libraries faced in the second year of the pandemic.

== Other countries ==
NLW has spread to different countries. The first National Library Week of the Jamaica Library Association was held March 6–12, 1966.

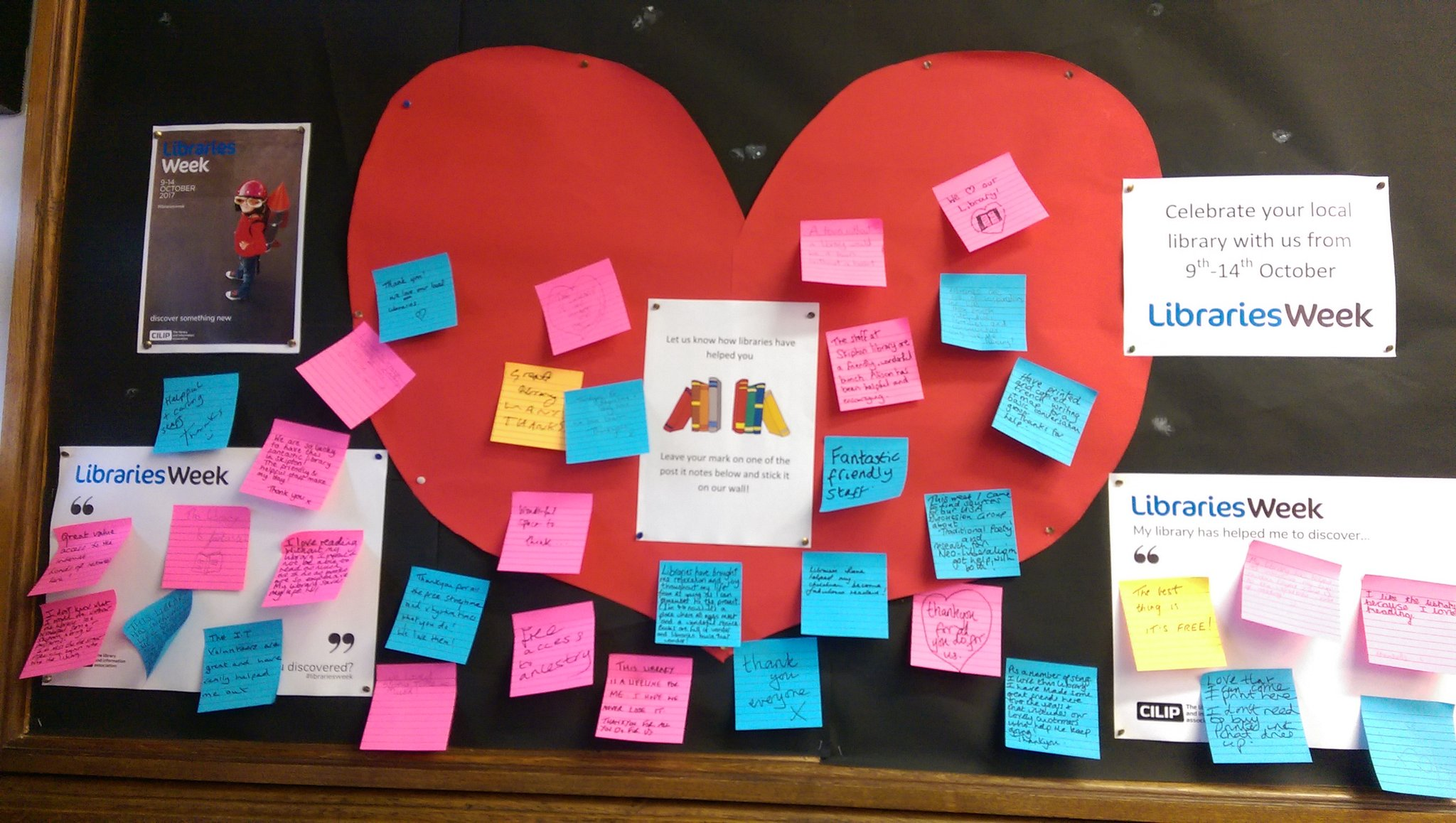
Libraries Week display in 2017, Skipton Library, UK

Australia's Library and Information Week is organized by the Australian Library and Information Association, and held annually at the end of May. The first Australian Library Week was held in 1968 by the Australian Library Promotion Council.

The UK observes Libraries Week, with celebrations dating back to at least 1966. It was revived as a one-day event, National Libraries Day, in 2012. It is now a week long observance, more formally organised by CILIP. In 2023, the week had an environmental focus, rebranded as Green Libraries Week and held 2–8 October.

South African Library Week is observed annually, since the early 2000s.

India has celebrated National Library Week in November since 1968.
