= Joseph Nathan Kane =

American writer, historian and journalist

- Born: January 23, 1899; New York City, New York
- Died: September 22, 2002 (aged 103); West Palm Beach, Florida
- Occupation: Author
- Known for: Reference books
- Spouse: Bertha Roche (m. 1932)
- Parents: Albert Norman Kane (father); Hulda (Ascheim) Kane (mother)

Joseph Nathan Kane (January 23, 1899 – September 22, 2002) was an American non-fiction writer.

== Works ==
Kane wrote a total of 52 books, some of which are these below.

- Famous First Facts (1933) H. W. Wilson (New York, NY), Fifth revised edition (1997).
- More First Facts (1935) H. W. Wilson (New York, NY).
- What Dog Is That? (1942) Greenberg (New York, NY).
- Centennial History of King Solomon Lodge, Number 279, Free and Accepted Masons, 1852-1952, King Solomon Lodge, Number 279 F & A.M. (1952) (New York, NY).
- The Perma Quiz Book, (1956) Permabooks (New York, NY).
- The Second Perma Quiz Book, (1958) Permabooks (New York, NY).
- American Counties: Record of Names of 3,067 counties (1960) Scarecrow Press (New York, NY).
- Nicknames of Cities and States of the United States, Scarecrow Press (1965) (w/ Gerard L. Alexander) New York, NY.
- Nicknames and Sobriquets of United States Cities, States, and Counties (1979).
- American Counties: Origins of County Names, Including 1980 Census Figures, Historical Data, and Published Sources (1983).
- Necessity's Child: Story of Walter Hunt (1997).
- Presidential Fact Book, (1998) Random House (New York, NY).
- Facts about the Presidents: A Compilation of Biographical and Historical Data, (1959), H. W. Wilson Company (New York, NY), Seventh revised edition (2001).
