= Tennessee Library Association =

Professional association for librarians in Tennessee

- Nickname: TNLA
- Formation: May 29, 1902; 123 years ago
- Founded at: Nashville, TN
- Tax ID no.: 62-0792105
- Parent organization: American Library Association
- Website: www.tnla.org

The Tennessee Library Association (TNLA) is a professional organization that offers support for library staff working in Tennessee. It is headquartered in Memphis, Tennessee. TLA was originally organized in Nashville on May 29, 1902, by members of the Nashville Public Library staff and the Nashville Library Club and had 41 members by 1905. G.H. Baskette, president of the Nashville Public Library, was the first president of TLA and served from 1902 to 1913. The first annual meeting of the association was in Nashville on January 18, 1905 and had an opening address by Governor Frazier.

TNLA publishes a regular newsletter and a quarterly journal called Tennessee Libraries (ISSN:1935-7052).

== See also ==
- List of libraries in the United States
