= H. W. Wilson Company =

American publishing company

- Parent company: EBSCO Publishing
- Founded: 1898; 128 years ago
- Founder: Halsey William Wilson
- Country of origin: United States
- Headquarters location: Highbridge, The Bronx, New York
- Publication types: Books, databases
- Official website: www.hwwilson.com (online) www.hwwilsoninprint.com (print)

The H. W. Wilson Company, Inc. is a publisher and indexing company that was founded in 1898 and is located in the Bronx, New York. It provides print and digital content aimed at patrons of public school, college, and professional libraries in both the United States and internationally. The company also provides indexing services that include text, retrospective, abstracting and indexing, as well other types of databases. Image gallery indexing includes art museum and cinema. The company also indexed reference monographs. An online retrieval system with various features, including language translation, is also available. The company merged with EBSCO Publishing in June 2011. Grey House Publishing currently publishes print editions of H. W. Wilson products under license.

== History ==
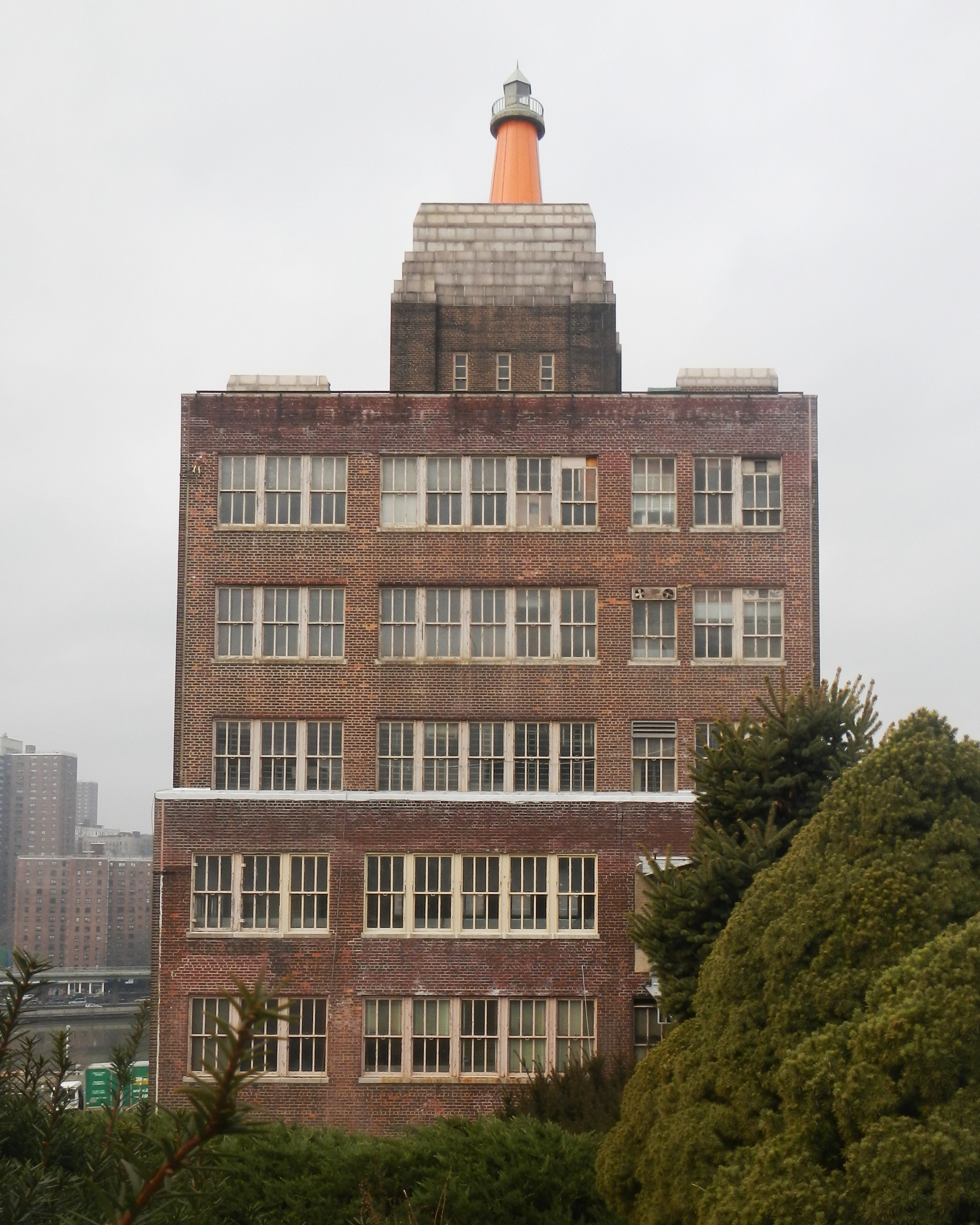
Lighthouse building, South Bronx

The H. W. Wilson Company was founded in 1898 by Halsey William Wilson, a student working his way through the University of Minnesota in Minneapolis, Minnesota. Together with his roommate, Henry S. Morris, Wilson started a book selling business serving educators and students at the university. When it was time for Morris to graduate, he sold his share of the business to Wilson. The H. W. Wilson Company's first original reference title was the Cumulative Book Index, first published in 1898. This was followed by the Readers' Guide to Periodical Literature in 1901.

In 1911, Wilson relocated the company to White Plains, New York, to be nearer to its main markets. By 1917, demand for more specialized indexes had grown to the point where the company had to move again. Wilson bought a five-story building in The Bronx on the banks of the Harlem River. The building's distinctive lighthouse was added in 1929.

The company also published some print references, such as Facts About the Presidents, Famous First Facts, and the monthly magazine Current Biography. The company published Monroe N. Work's A Bibliography of the Negro in Africa and America in 1928

=== Merger with EBSCO Publishing, June 2011 ===
On June 2, 2011, H. W. Wilson Company merged with EBSCO Publishing. Staff at the Dublin office of the company went to the Labour Court in Ireland and protested at EBSCO's failure to abide by its recommendations. Wilson's Bronx headquarters with its iconic lighthouse is not included in the merger and will be closed. Wilson's operations will relocate to EBSCO headquarters in Ipswich, Massachusetts which “offers room for expansion and is the logical choice for streamlining physical operations. While not always easy, making fiscally-responsible decisions such as this will allow us [to] invest more resources into increasing the value of the products and services that we create, and keep costs in check for our mutual companies” said Sam Brooks, EBSCO Publishing senior vice president, sales and marketing.

== John Cotton Dana Library Public Relations Award ==
The John Cotton Dana Award, sponsored by H.W. Wilson, honors outstanding library public relations, whether a summer reading program, a year-long centennial celebration, fundraising for a new college library, an awareness campaign, or an innovative partnership in the community. Award winners receive a cash development grant of $5,000 from the H.W. Wilson Foundation. The awards are presented at a reception hosted by H.W. Wilson Company, held during the American Library Association's annual conference.

== Database descriptions ==
=== Applied Sciences ===
H. W. Wilson Company's applied sciences indexing encompasses services under the title Applied Science & Technology. These are "abstracts", "full text", and "retrospective". Broad subject coverage includes the major scientific disciplines and their respective sub disciplines in abstracts or full text. For example, topical coverage includes acoustics, environmental and earth sciences, engineering (chemical, civil, environmental, electrical, industrial, etc.), geological sciences (including space science), food industry (and sciences), plastics, textile industry (including fabrics), transportation, and waste management. The retrospective indexing of Applied Science and Technology covers more than 1,350 periodicals from 1913 to 1983.

Applied Science & Technology covers over 780 periodicals, as well as sources such as conference proceedings and directories.

=== Art indexes ===
H. W. Wilson Company's indexing pertaining to art encompasses "Art Abstracts", "Art Full Text", "Art Index", and "Art Index Retrospective: 1929-1984". It includes 304 full-text journals that focus on fine art, decorative art, commercial art, photography, folk art, film, architecture and other areas. Subjects covered include art history and criticism, architecture and architectural history, archaeology, antiques, museum studies, graphic arts, industrial design, landscape architecture, interior design, folk art, painting, photography, pottery, sculpture, decorative arts, costume design, television, video, motion pictures, advertising art, non-western art, textiles and other related subjects.

== WilsonWeb ==
WilsonWeb is "an online based information retrieval system that offers an interface, multiple search modes, interactive help messages, and text translation into various languages".

== Publishings ==
- Best books on the war
- Index to short stories
- The vision of Anton as told by Walter A. Dyer
- A Bibliography of the Negro in Africa and America edited by Monroe N. Work (1928)
