= Keyes Metcalf =

American librarian

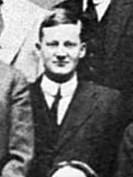

President of the American Library Association
- In office 1942–1943
- Preceded by: Charles Harvey Brown
- Succeeded by: Althea Warren

Personal details
- Born: April 13, 1889 Elyria, Ohio, US
- Died: November 3, 1983 (aged 94) Cambridge, Massachusetts, US
- Occupation: Librarian

Keyes DeWitt Metcalf (April 13, 1889 – November 3, 1983) was an American librarian. He has been identified as one of the 100 most important leaders in librarianship by the journal American Libraries. In a career spanning over 75 years, he worked in various roles at the New York Public Library and served as the director of the Harvard University library system. He was known for his expertise in planning and designing research libraries. He was a founder of the Farmington Plan.

== Early life and education ==
Keyes Metcalf was born on April 13, 1889, in Elyria, Ohio, the son of Issacs Stevens Metcalf and Harriet Metcalf. Both of his parents died when he was very young and his sister, Marion, raised him. Among the values he learned growing up was an important emphasis on education. It was expected that he would, at least, earn an undergraduate degree. Growing up, his sister put together a family newsletter, and everyone was expected to contribute. Metcalf's love of reading resulted in his contributions often being reviews of books he was reading.

Metcalf's experience in libraries began when he was thirteen years old, when he worked for at the Oberlin College library. His brother-in-law, Azariah Root, was the librarian. Here, he was taught how to organize the shelves and process new orders that came to the library. Despite being promised pay at five cents an hour, Metcalf was never paid for his efforts. He says about this oversight, "I'm inclined to believe that absent-mindedness on my employer's part, rather than poor work on mine, was why I was never paid ... but I never ventured to complain." Regardless of why he wasn't paid, Metcalf greatly enjoyed what he did and he knew he had found his life's work in librarianship.

After graduating high school, Metcalf attended Oberlin, once again working in the library under Root's tutelage. It was during this period that Metcalf assisted in the opening of a new library at Oberlin, an experience that would help him later in life as he planned new libraries at Harvard. After the facility was completed, Metcalf was charged with coordinating the move of the stacks to the new building. While moving books into the library, Metcalf acted as the building's security guard, setting up an elaborate system of stacked books in strategic locations to detect intruders. After graduating in 1911, Metcalf was accepted into the New York Public Library's Library School. He graduated from the school in 1915.

== Career ==
=== New York Public Library ===
While still in the library school, he began working in the stacks of the New York Public Library. This began a relationship that would last for over a quarter of a century. While working at the library, he served in many capacities, including the Chief of Stacks for three years and Assistant to the Director starting in 1919. Ultimately, in 1928 Metcalf was appointed Chief of the Reference Department. This was a position he would hold for the next ten years. While at the New York Public Library, he became interested in the use of technology in the library, when he expanded the use of the first photostat machine to the library in 1912. This innovation made the copying of documents significantly easier. He also introduced a microfilm system to the library. His goal here was primarily to save certain books from damage from heavy use. (Metcalf 1980: 279) Metcalf considered these contributions to be the things he was most proud of in his years at the New York Public Library.

=== Harvard University ===
In 1937, Metcalf was appointed Director of University Libraries at Harvard. His tenure at Harvard was where he made a significant impact to librarianship. Early on, he encountered a problem that would face many libraries – a lack of adequate space. Widener Library, the university's main library, would run out of space in a few years. In addition, the collection was so immense and the catalog so complex, it was often difficult to find materials. Metcalf recalled stories of students who were proud of the fact that they never had to use the library. Metcalf's mandate was to design a system that would meet the space needs of the library until the end of the twentieth century. The plan he came up with in 1938 was what he called “coordinated decentralization.” While recognizing that decentralizing library services wasn't the ideal solution, he also realized that Harvard, with 76 individual collections or facilities, already was very decentralized. He became convinced that students could be well served by separate libraries, as long as each building was organized around a single topic or, in some cases, audience. To realize this plan, he proposed the construction of new facilities, including the Houghton Library for rare books in 1942, and the Lamont Library, a library designed for the needs of undergraduates in 1949. The construction of Lamont succeeded in addressing a major complaint of the university's undergraduate population – they couldn't easily find materials in Widener because of the sheer volume, or they would find that some materials were reserved for graduate students and inaccessible to undergraduates. He also expanded interlibrary cooperatives. Besides building new facilities, he also proposed splitting up Widener's collection to libraries focused on the subject matter of the material.

When planning these new facilities, Metcalf was concerned about the security of the collection – damage to manuscripts and books from variations in heat and humidity, or worst of all, damage from a flood. In the case of Houghton, the building that was to house the rare collections at Harvard, many features were designed into the air conditioning and plumbing systems that were meant to mitigate the risk of damage. Catch basins were installed under any pipe running horizontally to catch and divert any water from leaks. The plumbing system itself was designed so that the location of leaks could be found quickly through a series of shut-off valves, and the walls were designed with easy access to plumbing. The display cases themselves were designed so that they were well ventilated. This allowed lighting to be installed in the cases (rather than outside) without impacting the temperature and humidity levels. It was features like these that helped keep the collections safe.

Metcalf's experience at Harvard made him and his staff experts in the problems that were facing many research libraries at the time. Metcalf was often called on to consult with other libraries. Harvard became the benchmark for solutions to these problems. Metcalf consulted on the libraries for the Army and Navy, and in 1942 was asked to chair a study of the University of Illinois Library School.

During this time, Metcalf was also active in the American Library Association. He served as its president in 1942 and 1943. His participation in the ALA may have contributed to Metcalf being among the first of Harvard's staff to be targeted by Senator Joseph McCarthy in his search for communists. As chair of the ALA's International Relations Board, Metcalf was asked to participate on a government committee that selected books to be included in US libraries abroad. McCarthy sought information from Metcalf on whether he had approved of the selection of a book written by Howard Fast, a Communist. If he had, would he approve it again? In his response to McCarthy, Metcalf endorsed freedom of information in all libraries, including those managed by the government, and stated plainly that if the opportunity arose, he would select Fast's book again. McCarthy never responded.

After 17 years of service, Metcalf retired in 1955 and was named Director Emeritus.

He was a member of the American Antiquarian Society from 1937 and a member of the Council.

== Retirement ==
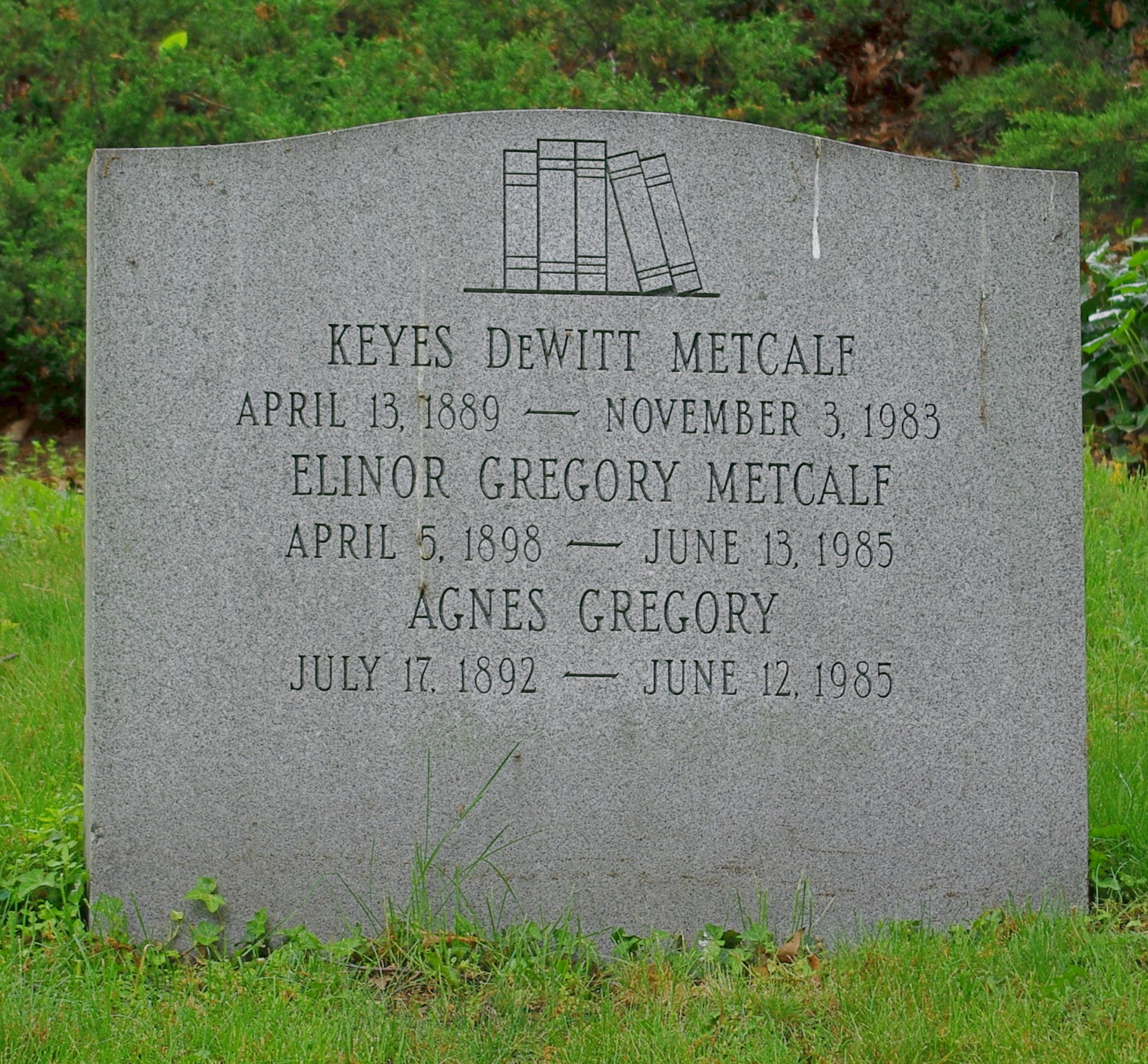
Headstone, Mount Auburn Cemetery

Metcalf continued to be active in librarianship throughout his retirement. Based on his experiences in redesigning the Harvard Library System and other research libraries, he wrote the book Planning Academic and Research Library Buildings in 1965. This book is widely regarded as the most comprehensive work on the topic. He taught classes and seminars, including a stint as an adjunct faculty member at Rutgers University.

Over the span of his career, he received many awards and honoraria, including 13 honorary doctorate degrees. In 1963 he was awarded American Library Association Honorary Membership, recognizing contribution "so outstanding that it is of lasting importance to the advancement of the whole field of library service.". In 1966 the Association honored him with the Joseph W. Lippincott Award.

Metcalf also worked as a consultant in the planning stages of what is today the Harold B. Lee Library at Brigham Young University, Hillman Library at the University of Pittsburgh, and Bracken Library at Ball State University.

Keyes Metcalf died of a heart attack on November 3, 1983, in Cambridge, Massachusetts.

== Notes ==
Non-profit organization positions
Preceded by Charles Harvey Brown	President of the American Library Association; 1942–1943	Succeeded by Althea Warren
