= Orosi Branch Library =

- U.S. National Register of Historic Places
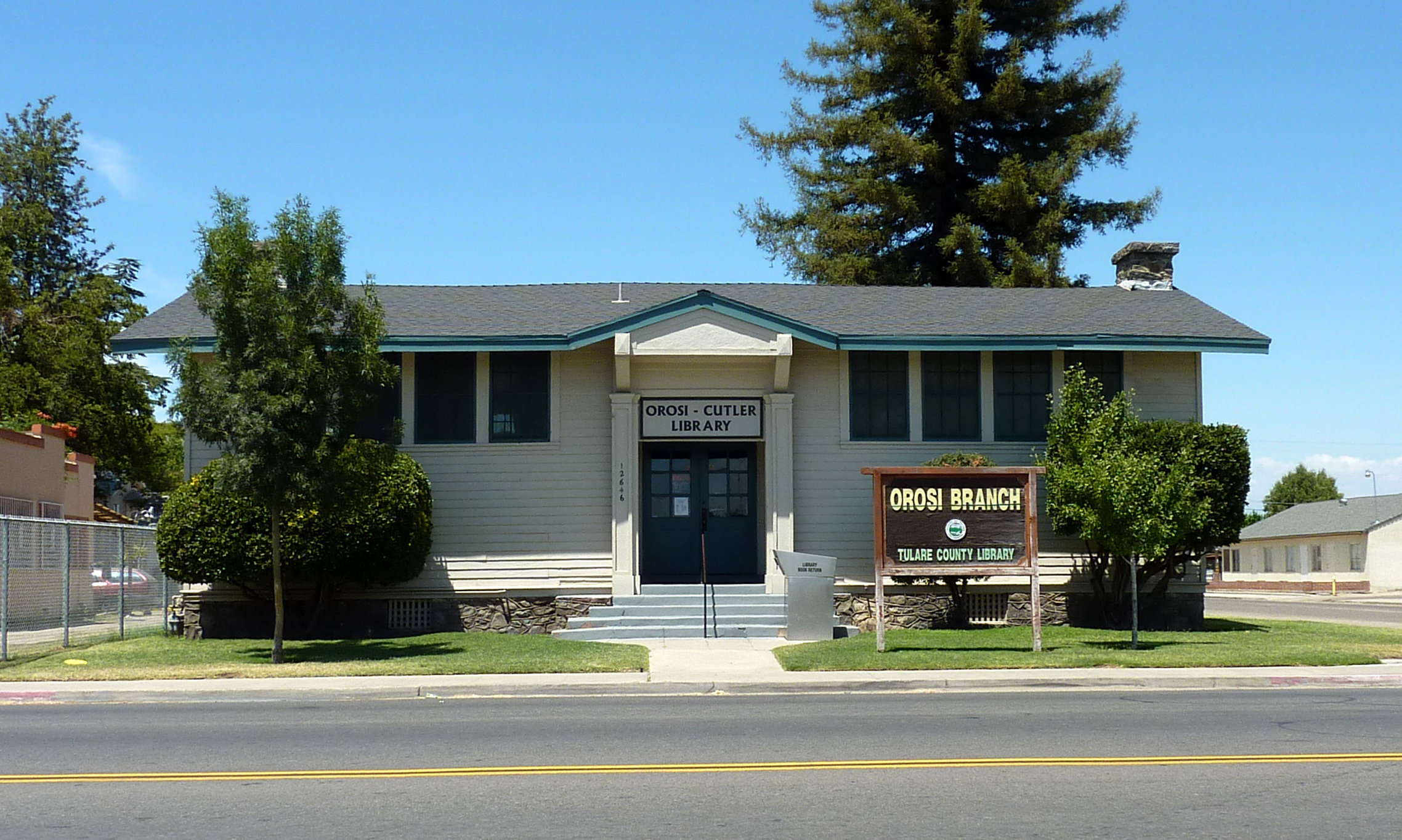

- Location within California Location within the United States
- Location: 12662 Ave. 416, Orosi, California
- Coordinates: 36°32′42″N 119°17′22″W
- Area: 0.1 acres (0.040 ha)
- Built: 1921
- Built by: Fred Hill
- Architectural style: Bungalow
- NRHP reference No.: 83001247
- Added to NRHP: August 25, 1983

The Orosi Branch Library, also known as the Orosi/Cutler Branch Library, is a Carnegie library located at 12662 Ave. 416 in Orosi, California. The library was built in 1921 with a $3000 grant from the Carnegie Foundation; while the foundation had issued the grant in 1917, construction was held up for four years by World War I. The wood frame library is a California bungalow, a plain style following James Bertram's suggestions for Carnegie Library design; it is one of the few wood-frame Carnegie libraries constructed. The library is still in use; it is one of two remaining Carnegie libraries in Tulare County, along with the Exeter Public Library.

The Orosi Branch Library was added to the National Register of Historic Places on August 25, 1983.
