= Charles Belden (disambiguation) =

Charles Belden (1887–1966) was an American photographer and rancher.

Charles Belden may also refer to:

- Charles F. D. Belden (1870–1931), American librarian, president of the American Library Association
- Charles William Belden, birth name of Bunny Belden (1900–1976), American football player
- Charles S. Belden (1904–1954), Hollywood screenwriter
