= Alma Dawson =

American scholar of librarianship (1943–2025)

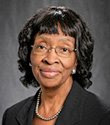
- Born: February 4, 1943
- Died: September 11, 2025 (aged 82)
- Occupations: Librarian, scholar, library science educator

Alma Dawson (February 4, 1943 – September 11, 2025) was an American scholar of librarianship. She retired as Russell B. Long Professor at the School of Library & Information Science, Louisiana State University in 2014 and was awarded Emeritus status in 2015. In 2019 Dr. Dawson was honored with the Essae Martha Culver Distinguished Service Award from the Louisiana Library Association which honors a librarian whose professional service and achievements, whose leadership in Louisiana association work, and whose lifetime accomplishments in a field of librarianship within the state merit recognition of particular value to Louisiana librarianship.

== Life and career ==
Dawson earned the B.S. degree from Grambling State University in secondary education and taught in the Natchitoches Parish School System. She earned the master's degree in library and information science from the University of Michigan in Ann Arbor. She then worked as head Serials Librarian in the W. R. Banks Library at Prairie View A&M University. She was selected for the Mellon-ACRL Internship Project in 1978 and assigned to the University of Wisconsin Library, in Milwaukee, January–June 1978.

In 1982 Dawson joined the Louisiana State University Libraries faculty as the library and information science librarian. She served as editor of the "Professional Sources" column for the Reference and User Services Association journal, RQ and as a reviewer during the 1980s.

Dawson earned the PhD in Library Science and Higher Education from the Texas Woman's University in 1996 and joined the faculty of the School of Library and Information Science at Louisiana State University where she was promoted through the academic ranks to the named professorship: Russell B. Long Professor.

The history of the Louisiana Library Association under Jim Crow was documented by Dawson in "The Participation of African Americans in the Louisiana Library Association."

Dawson was featured as a pioneering African American scholar in American Libraries in 2018.

Dawson died on September 11, 2025, at the age of 82.

== Mentorship and recruitment ==
Dawson established a program of mentorship for minority and international students at Louisiana State University in 1995 in collaboration with the Louisiana Library Association Minority and Professional Concerns Interest Group. In 1997 she was granted funds for an Institute to train public and school librarians about selection and evaluation of multicultural literature. She documented this work in the journal, Louisiana Libraries.

== Project Recovery ==
Dawson was awarded a grant from the Institute of Museum and Library Services in 2009 titled “Project Recovery." Students recruited under this initiative received IMLS-funded scholarships to earn master's degrees in librarianship. As part of their education and early-career development, the students participated in projects identified by partner libraries affected by Hurricane Katrina and Hurricane Rita. Suzanne M. Stauffer collaborated on public library recruitment.

== Publications ==
- "Educating the Next Generation of Librarians for South Louisiana Libraries: Project Recovery Scholars Tell Their Stories." Louisiana Libraries 75 (Fall 2012).
- "Preserving memories, community, and restoring hope: Katrina and Haiti: Experiences after the disasters." Acuril Xli: Proceedings from the Annual Conference : the Role of Libraries and Archives in Disaster Preparedness, Response, and Research. Tampa, Fla: Association of Caribbean University, Research and Institutional Libraries (ACURIL), 2011.
- “Rebuilding Community in Louisiana after the Hurricanes of 2005.” Reference and User Services Quarterly. 46 (Summer 2006): 292–296.
- The African-American Reader’s Advisor: A Guide for Readers, Librarians, and Educators. Edited by Alma Dawson and Connie Van Fleet. Englewood, Colorado: Greenwood Publishing Group, 2004.
- A History of the Louisiana Library Association. Edited by Alma Dawson and Florence Jumonville. Baton Rouge: The Louisiana Library Association, 2003.
- Celebrating African American Librarians and Librarianship. Library Trends, 49.1 (Summer 2000): 49–87.
- "A Marriage Made in Heaven or a Blind Date: Successful Library-Faculty Partnering in Distance Education". with Dana Watson. Catholic Library World. 70(September 1999): 14–22.
- Dawson, Alma. Report on the Survey of Library Science Collections. ACRL Discussion Group of Library Science Librarians, 1990.
- Development of a Core Library Collection for Library Automation: Report to the Council on Library Resources on Project CLR #4026-B. Baton Rouge, LA: Research Center Annex, School of Library and Information Science, Louisiana State University, 1989.

== Awards ==
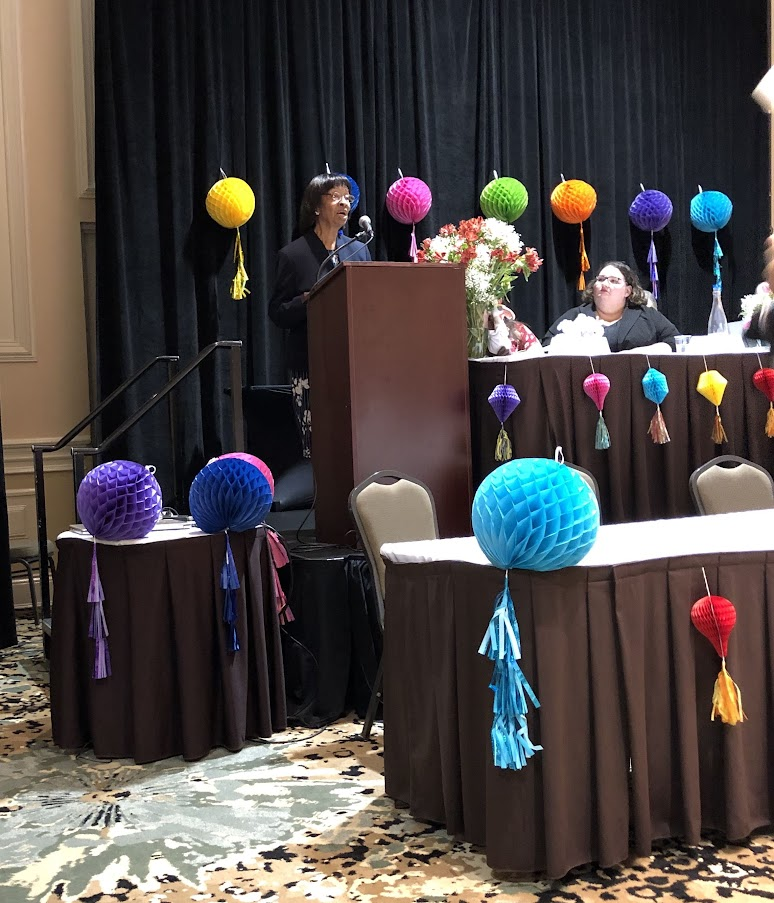
Dr. Alma Dawson honored with the Essae Martha Culver Award, Louisiana Library Association

- 2005 recipient of the American Library Association Equality Award, which recognizes contributions for promoting equality in the library profession.
- 2012 Louisiana Library Association's Meritorious Service Award. The Award honors a librarian who has demonstrated sustained and exemplary leadership and service to further the development services and visibility of the Louisiana Library Association.
- 2013 Advocate for Diversity Award-Louisiana State University, College of Human Sciences and Education.
- 2015 Emeritus Professor at Louisiana State University.
- 2019 Louisiana Library Association. Essae Martha Culver Award.
- 2026. American Library Association (January 28, 2026). "Memorial Resolution Honoring Dr. Alma Dawson."
