= Exeter Public Library =

- U.S. National Register of Historic Places
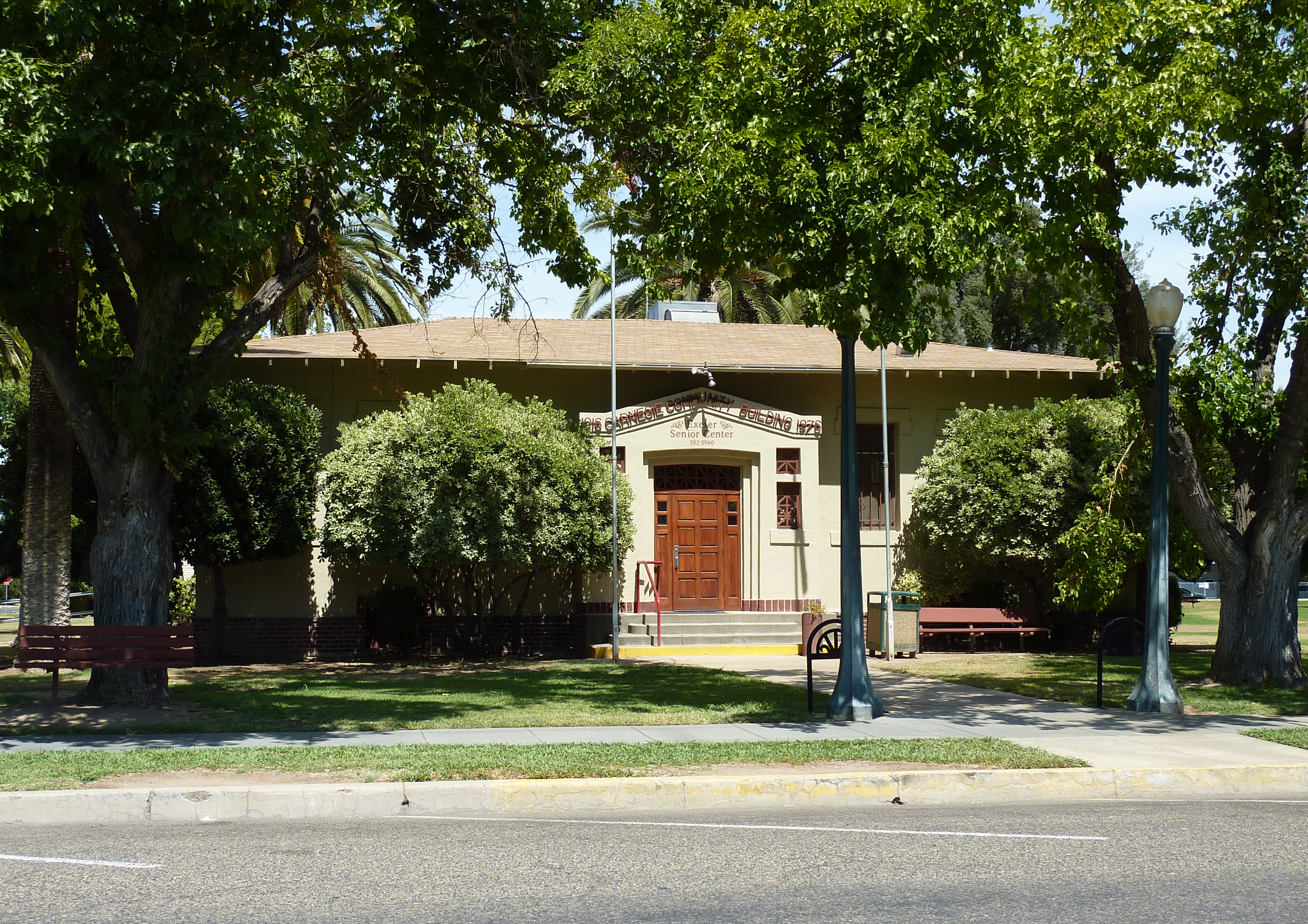

- Location within California Location within the United States
- Location: 309 S. E St., Exeter, California
- Coordinates: 36°17′36″N 119°8′17″W
- Area: less than one acre
- Built: 1916; 110 years ago
- Architect: Merrill A. Bowser
- Architectural style: Mission Revival
- MPS: California Carnegie Libraries MPS
- NRHP reference No.: 90001811
- Added to NRHP: December 10, 1990

The Exeter Public Library is a Carnegie library located at 309 S. E St. in Exeter, California. The library was built in 1916 with a $5000 grant from the Carnegie Foundation; it was one of six Carnegie libraries built in Tulare County. Exeter's library program had been started in 1910 by the city Women's Club but lacked its own building prior to the construction of the Carnegie Library. The library was designed in the Mission Revival style by A. Merrill Bowser, whose plans were selected from three designs submitted to James Bertram. The design includes a low hip roof, a gabled parapet, and a wide entrance with panels of glass to the sides of the door. A Union Jack motif is used in the windows and the transom above the front door. The building served as the city's library until 1976, when it became a community center. It is one of two surviving Carnegie libraries in Tulare County, the other being the Orosi Branch Library.

The Exeter Public Library was added to the National Register of Historic Places on December 10, 1990.
