= Louisiana Library Association =

Professional association for librarians in Louisiana

- Nickname: LLA
- Formation: 1909
- Tax ID no.: 72-0643689
- Purpose: Promote library interests of the State of Louisiana
- Headquarters: Baton Rouge, Louisiana
- Parent organization: American Library Association

The Louisiana Library Association (LLA) is a professional organization for Louisiana's librarians and library workers. It is headquartered in Baton Rouge, Louisiana. The LLA publishes The LLA Bulletin (est. 1937) and Louisiana Libraries magazine.

It was originally founded in 1909, called the Louisiana State Library Association, after a call for a statewide library group from the New Orleans Library Club. An initial meeting of thirty people was held at Tulane University in 1909 with the goal of increasing the number of trained librarians in the state and drafting library legislation. The main speaker was Chalmers Hadley president of the American Library Association. The LLA fell into some disorder during and after World War I, and was reorganized in 1925. The LLA Convention or Conference began in 1909 has been held annually (except for 1914-1924, 1933, and 1945).

LLA became a chapter member of the American Library Association in 1939, and has been a member since then with the exception of a period from March 5, 1963 through mid-1965 when the Executive Board of LLA resigned from ALA because the organization was not integrated. LLA had voted in 1947 to admit Black members, but because of state segregation laws had not been able to implement the change.

The history of the association under Jim Crow has been documented by Alma Dawson in "The Participation of African Americans in the Louisiana Library Association." Before 1965 the Louisiana Colored Teachers’ Association (later called the Louisiana Education Association) had a libraries section which counted public, school, and academic librarians among its members.

In 1992 a joint conference was held in New Orleans with the Southeastern Library Association.

The first Black president of LLA was Idella Washington who was elected in 1998.

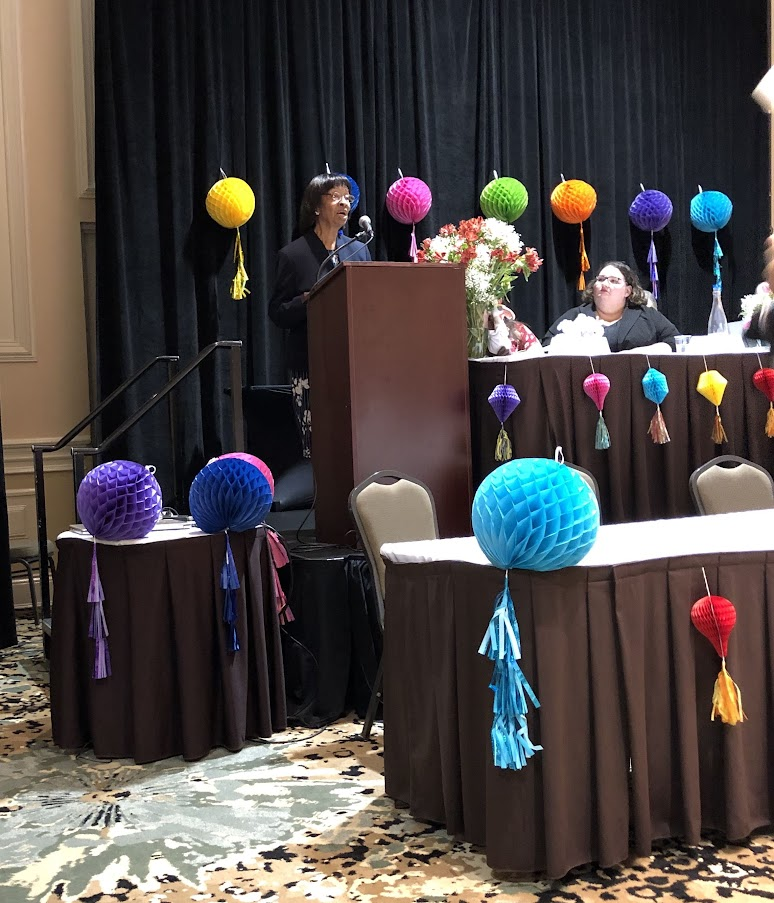
Dr. Alma Dawson awarded Essae M. Culver Award at 2019 LLA Conference.

In 1999 the LLA Bulletin was renamed Louisiana Libraries.

The 2021 conference was held as a virtual conference during the COVID-19 pandemic.

== Awards ==
The Louisiana Library Association established its Awards program in 1944.

- The Association bestows the Essae Martha Culver award for lifetime contributions to librarianship in Louisiana. In 2019 the award was given to Dr. Alma Dawson, the first African American so honored.
- The Alex Allain Intellectual Freedom Award recognizes the contribution of an individual or a group who/which has actively promoted intellectual freedom in Louisiana. It is named for Alexander Allain, lawyer and library trustee who was first chair of the Louisiana Library Association Intellectual Freedom Committee.
- James O. Modisette Awards are given in memory of James O. Modisette, a Louisiana Library Commissioner who worked with Essae M. Culver to develop library services in the state.
- Lucy B. Foote Award recognizing the contributions of subject specialists to the library profession in memory of Lucy B Foote, who made lasting contributions to Louisiana State Documents librarianship and special collections.
- The Louisiana Literary Award promotes books related to Louisiana. The first award in 1949, was to folklorist, Hewitt L. Leonard Ballowe, for Creole Folk Tales: Stories of the Louisiana Marsh Country. Recent award winning books:
  - 2024. Necropolis: Disease, Power, and Capitalism in the Cotton Kingdom by Kathryn Olivarius.
  - 2023. Monumental: Oscar Dunn and His Radical Fight in Reconstruction Louisiana by Brian K.Mitchell published by the Historic New Orleans Collection.
  - 2022. The Vanishing Half by Britt Bennet.
  - 2021. Spreading the Gospel of Books: Essae M. Culver and the Genesis of Louisiana Parish Libraries.by Florence M. Jumonville.
  - 2020. Tinderbox: The Untold Story of the Up Stairs Lounge Fire and the Rise of Gay Liberation by Robert W. Fieseler.
  - 2019. Tragedy of Brady Sims by Ernest J. Gaines.
  - 2018. Ain't There No More: Louisiana's Disappearing Coastal Plain by Carl A. Brasseaux and Donald W. Davis.
  - 2017. Legendary Louisiana Outlaws: The Villains and Heroes of Folk Justice by Dr. Keagan LeJeune.
  - 2016. Billy Cannon: A Long, Long Run by Charles N. deGravelles.
  - 2015. Bourbon Street: A History by Richard Campanella.
  - 2014. Louisiana Eats! The People, the Food, and Their Stories by Poppy Tooker and David G. Speilman.

== Scholarships ==
The LLA offers multiple scholarships each year. The LLA Scholarship is for students enrolled in full-time study toward a Master's Degree in Library Science at Louisiana State University School of Library and Information Science. The Mary Moore Mitchell Scholarship is for part-time study. Recipients of both scholarships are selected by the Scholarship Committee with advice of the faculty at the Louisiana State University School of Library and Information Science.

== See also ==
- List of libraries in the United States
