= Orosi, California =

Orosi
- census-designated place
- Location in Tulare County and the state of California

- Location in the United States
- Coordinates: 36°32′33″N 119°17′20″W
- Country: United States
- State: California
- County: Tulare

Area
  - Total: 2.576 sq mi (6.672 km^{2})
  - Land: 2.576 sq mi (6.672 km^{2})
  - Water: 0 sq mi (0 km^{2}) 0%
- Elevation: 374 ft (114 m)

Population (2020)
  - Total: 8,329
  - Density: 3,233/sq mi (1,248/km^{2})
- Time zone: UTC-8 (Pacific (PST))
  - Summer (DST): UTC-7 (PDT)
- ZIP code: 93647
- Area code: 559
- FIPS code: 06-54372
- GNIS feature IDs: 230107, 2409000

Orosi is a census-designated place (CDP) in Tulare County, California, United States. The population was 8,329 at the 2020 census, down from 8,770 at the 2010 census.

== History ==
The community was founded in 1888 by Daniel R. Shafer. It was named "oro," or gold, for the golden poppies covering the nearby fields. A post office was established in 1892.

== Geography ==
According to the United States Census Bureau, the CDP has a total area of 2.6 square miles (6.7 km^{2}), all land.

== Demographics ==
Historical population
Census	Pop.	Note	%±
1960	1,048		—
1970	2,757		163.1%
1980	4,076		47.8%
1990	2,412		−40.8%
2000	2,320		−3.8%
2010	14,266		514.9%
2020	8,329		−41.6%
U.S. Decennial Census; 1850–1870 1880-1890; 1900 1910 1920; 1930 1940 1950; 1960 1970 1980; 1990 2000 2010

Orosi first appeared as a census designated place in the 1960 U.S. census; and as a census designated place in the 1980 U.S. census.

=== 2020 census ===
As of the 2020 census, Orosi had a population of 8,329. The population density was 3,233.3 inhabitants per square mile (1,248.4/km^{2}). The median age was 30.4 years. 30.8% of residents were under the age of 18, and 10.4% of residents were 65 years of age or older. For every 100 females, there were 100.1 males, and for every 100 females age 18 and over there were 100.4 males.

95.8% of residents lived in urban areas, while 4.2% lived in rural areas.

The whole population lived in households. There were 2,065 households, of which 57.2% had children under the age of 18 living in them. Of all households, 55.1% were married-couple households, 8.4% were cohabiting couple households, 12.6% were households with a male householder and no spouse or partner present, and 23.9% were households with a female householder and no spouse or partner present. About 10.7% of all households were made up of individuals, and 5.6% had someone living alone who was 65 years of age or older. The average household size was 4.03. There were 1,796 families (87.0% of all households).

There were 2,101 housing units at an average density of 815.6 units per square mile (314.9 units/km^{2}). Of all housing units, 1.7% were vacant and 98.3% were occupied. The homeowner vacancy rate was 0.1%, and the rental vacancy rate was 1.1%. Of occupied units, 51.5% were owner-occupied and 48.5% were occupied by renters.

Racial composition as of the 2020 census
Race	Number	Percent
White	1,740	20.9%
Black or African American	28	0.3%
American Indian and Alaska Native	130	1.6%
Asian	669	8.0%
Native Hawaiian and Other Pacific Islander	8	0.1%
Some other race	3,352	40.2%
Two or more races	2,402	28.8%
Hispanic or Latino (of any race)	7,418	89.1%

=== Demographic estimates ===
In 2023, the US Census Bureau estimated that 44.0% of the population were foreign-born. Of all people aged 5 or older, 10.6% spoke only English at home, 82.7% spoke Spanish, 0.6% spoke other Indo-European languages, 5.9% spoke Asian or Pacific Islander languages, and 0.2% spoke other languages. Of those aged 25 or older, 51.4% were high school graduates and 5.8% had a bachelor's degree.

=== Income and poverty ===
The median household income in 2023 was $49,279, and the per capita income was $16,393. About 18.2% of families and 24.7% of the population were below the poverty line.

=== 2010 census ===
The 2010 United States census reported that Orosi had a population of 8,770. The population density was 3,586.2 inhabitants per square mile (1,384.6/km^{2}). The racial makeup of Orosi was 3,861 (44.0%) White, 65 (0.7%) African American, 57 (0.6%) Native American, 803 (9.2%) Asian, 1 (0.0%) Pacific Islander, 3,638 (41.5%) from other races, and 345 (3.9%) from two or more races. Hispanic or Latino of any race were 7,606 persons (86.7%).

The Census reported that 8,770 people (100% of the population) lived in households, 0 (0%) lived in non-institutionalized group quarters, and 0 (0%) were institutionalized.

There were 1,985 households, out of which 1,285 (64.7%) had children under the age of 18 living in them, 1,180 (59.4%) were opposite-sex married couples living together, 375 (18.9%) had a female householder with no husband present, 197 (9.9%) had a male householder with no wife present. There were 196 (9.9%) unmarried opposite-sex partnerships, and 7 (0.4%) same-sex married couples or partnerships. 167 households (8.4%) were made up of individuals, and 85 (4.3%) had someone living alone who was 65 years of age or older. The average household size was 4.42. There were 1,752 families (88.3% of all households); the average family size was 4.50.

The age distribution was 3,086 people (35.2%) under the age of 18, 1,083 people (12.3%) aged 18 to 24, 2,397 people (27.3%) aged 25 to 44, 1,552 people (17.7%) aged 45 to 64, and 652 people (7.4%) who were 65 years of age or older. The median age was 26.4 years. For every 100 females, there were 107.0 males. For every 100 females age 18 and over, there were 108.1 males.

There were 2,070 housing units at an average density of 846.5 per square mile (326.8/km^{2}), of which 1,118 (56.3%) were owner-occupied, and 867 (43.7%) were occupied by renters. The homeowner vacancy rate was 2.6%; the rental vacancy rate was 3.7%. 4,928 people (56.2% of the population) lived in owner-occupied housing units and 3,842 people (43.8%) lived in rental housing units.

== Arts and culture ==
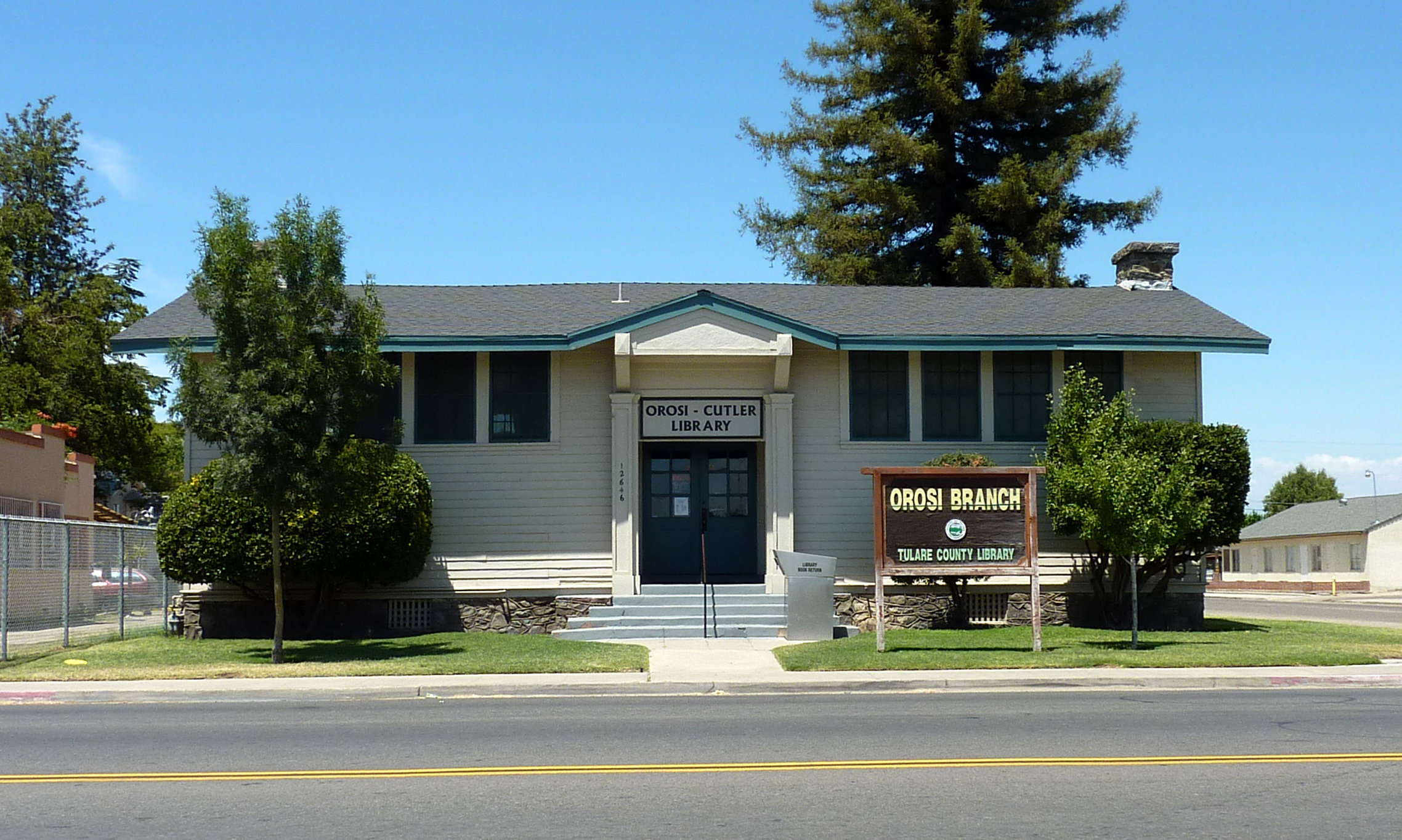
Orosi Branch Library

The Orosi Branch Library is listed on the National Register of Historic Places.

== Government ==
In the state legislature, Orosi is located in the 16th senatorial district, represented by Democrat Melissa Hurtado, and in the 33rd Assembly district, represented by Republican Alexandra Macedo.

In the United States House of Representatives, Orosi is in California's 21st congressional district, represented by Democrat Jim Costa.

== Education ==
The community is served by the Cutler-Orosi Joint Unified School District. The zoned comprehensive high school is Orosi High School.

A campus of the College of the Sequoias is located on Orosi High School grounds.

== Notable people ==
- Mike Garcia, professional baseball pitcher.
- Tad Wieman, college football player and coach; member of College Football Hall of Fame.

== See also ==
East Orosi, California- though commonly considered merely the east side of Orosi, has its own CDP with a population of approximately 500.
