= Judson Toll Jennings =

American librarian

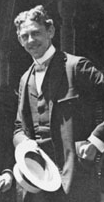

President of the American Library Association
- In office 1923–1924
- Preceded by: George Burwell Utley
- Succeeded by: Herman H. B. Meyer

Personal details
- Born: September 24, 1872; Schenectady, New York, US
- Died: February 8, 1948 (aged 75); Seattle, Washington, US
- Occupation: Librarian

Judson Toll Jennings (September 24, 1872 – February 8, 1948) was an American librarian. Jennings served as the director of the Seattle Public Library from 1907 to 1942. Upon retirement, Jennings became the first chair of a new King County Rural Library District, the predecessor to the modern-day King County Library System.

He was president of the American Library Association from 1923 to 1924.

== Bibliography ==
- Bibliography of New York Colonial History (1901)
- With the ALA Service Overseas Bulletin of the American Library Association, Volume 13 (July 1, 1919)
- Library Recruiting Bulletin of the American Library Association, Volume 16 (July 1, 1922)
- Voluntary education through the public library American Library Association (1929)
- A program for library development in the state of Washington Washington Library Association (December, 1934)

Non-profit organization positions
Preceded by George Burwell Utley	President of the American Library Association; 1923–1924	Succeeded by Herman H. B. Meyer
