= George Burwell Utley =

American librarian (1876–1946)

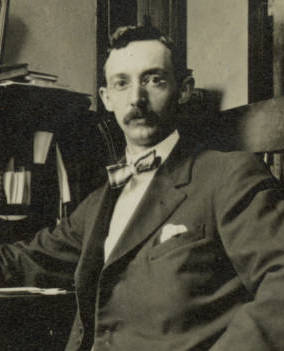

President of the American Library Association
- In office 1922–1923
- Preceded by: Azariah Smith Root
- Succeeded by: Judson Toll Jennings

Personal details
- Born: December 3, 1876 Hartford, Connecticut, U.S.
- Died: October 4, 1946 (aged 69) Pleasant Valley, Connecticut, U.S.
- Spouse: Lou Mabel Gilbert (m. 1901)
- Education: Colgate University; Brown University
- Occupation: Librarian

George Burwell Utley (December 3, 1876 – October 4, 1946) was an American librarian. Utley was a published author, first director of the Jacksonville Public Library (Florida), librarian of the Newberry Library in Chicago, Illinois, and served terms as secretary and later as president of the American Library Association. In 1999, American Libraries named him one of the "100 Most Important Leaders We Had in the 20th Century".

== Education ==
Utley was born in Hartford, Connecticut. George Burwell Utley received his formal education from Vermont Academy, Colgate University, and Brown University. It was "from Brown University that Utley received his Ph.B. in 1899. While his formal education ended with the bachelor of philosophy, Brown bestowed upon him an honorary A.M. in 1923."

== Early career ==
George Utley's first position in the library science field came at the Watkinson Library on the campus of Trinity College, Hartford, Connecticut. Utley stayed at Watkinson from when finished his degree at Brown in 1899 through 1901. "Watkinson had a strong collection of Americana that appealed to Utley's scholarly instincts."

After Watckinson, Utley was employed by the Maryland Diocesan Library in Baltimore, Maryland. Utley "remained in Baltimore until 1905 when he left for a position in Jacksonville, Florida".

== Jacksonville Public Library ==
In June 1905, after two years of construction, the Jacksonville Public Library in Florida was completed and opened its doors for patron and public use. George Burwell Utley was the selection to be the "first librarian of the first tax supported public library in the state of Florida."

After only two years the Jacksonville Library, under the guidance of George B. Utley, had become a cornerstone of the community. "In 1907 George B. Utley said that the Jacksonville Public Library was "fast becoming securely established as a part of the municipal fabric, and is considered more and more a necessity and less and less a luxury by the citizens of Jacksonville.""

After six years with Jacksonville Library "Utley left Florida and began his tenure with the American Library Association in 1911."

== American Library Association Secretary ==
In 1911 when the American Library Association was searching for a replacement secretary for Chalmers Hadley they turned to George Utley. At that time he resigned from his post in Jacksonville, Florida, and moved with his wife to Chicago, Illinois.

George Utley served as secretary of the American Library Association from 1911 through 1920 with one break in that span. "From 1917 to 1919 Mr. Utley and his wife moved to Washington DC where he served as executive secretary of the Library War Service during the American involvement in World War I." During this period the American Library Association was also located in Washington, D.C., and supplied books and materials to American troops involved in the conflict. Utley was a key part of this effort for the length of the American involvement in World War One.

== Newberry Library and American Library Association President ==
In 1920, after World War One had drawn to a conclusion, George Utley moved back to Chicago with the intention of resuming his duties as secretary of the American Library Association. It was at this time that "Mr. Edward L Ryerson from the Newberry Library, also located in Chicago, came to the American Library Association headquarters to recruit Utley. George Utley accepted a position as librarian of the Newberry Library."

Utley resigned as secretary of the American Library Association and began his long career working as librarian of the renowned Newberry Library. Even though he had moved into his position with the Newberry Library it would not be the end of his days in prominence with the American Library Association. From 1922 to 1923 Utley was able to handle both his duties at the Newberry Library and served a term as president of the American Library Association.
After his term as president of the American Library Association came to an end Utley served as president of the Illinois Library Association in 1925 and would focus his energies on the Newberry Library. Under Utley's direction the Newberry's "collection increased to one of 180,000 volumes of carefully chosen works in English and American literature and history."
He was at Newberry until his retirement in 1942. Utley did not voluntarily retire but was caught up in a policy move by the Newberry Library's board of trustees. "The Board had passed a policy stating that all employees would be forced to retire when they reached the age of 65. At this time Utley was reaching his 65th year and was forced to step down from his post at the Newberry Library."

At the time of his stepping down from the Newberry Library, Utley was very well known, and his retirement was even noted in the June 15, 1942, issue of Time.

== Author ==
Utley's "research while writing papers on the Maryland Diocesan Library's rare books led him to write" his first published and perhaps best known work The Life and Times of Thomas John Claggett, First Bishop of Maryland and the First Bishop Consecrated in America. This title was first published in 1913 and is still in print.

In 1926 Utley's Fifty Years of the American Library Association was published by the American Library Association.

In 1951, five years after his death, the American Library Association published Utley's The Librarians’ Conference of 1853. "Utley had not completely finished this work before his death and the book was edited and finished by Utley's nephew, Gilbert H. Doane, before it went to print."

== Personal life ==
Utley married Lou Mabel Gilbert of Fairfield, Vermont, in 1901.

Upon retirement George Utley and his wife left Chicago and returned to his native Connecticut. He spent the next four years there until his death. Utley died at his home in Pleasant Valley, Connecticut, on October 4, 1946.

Non-profit organization positions
Preceded by Azariah Smith Root	President of the American Library Association; 1922–1923	Succeeded by Judson Toll Jennings
