= Alice S. Tyler =

American librarian

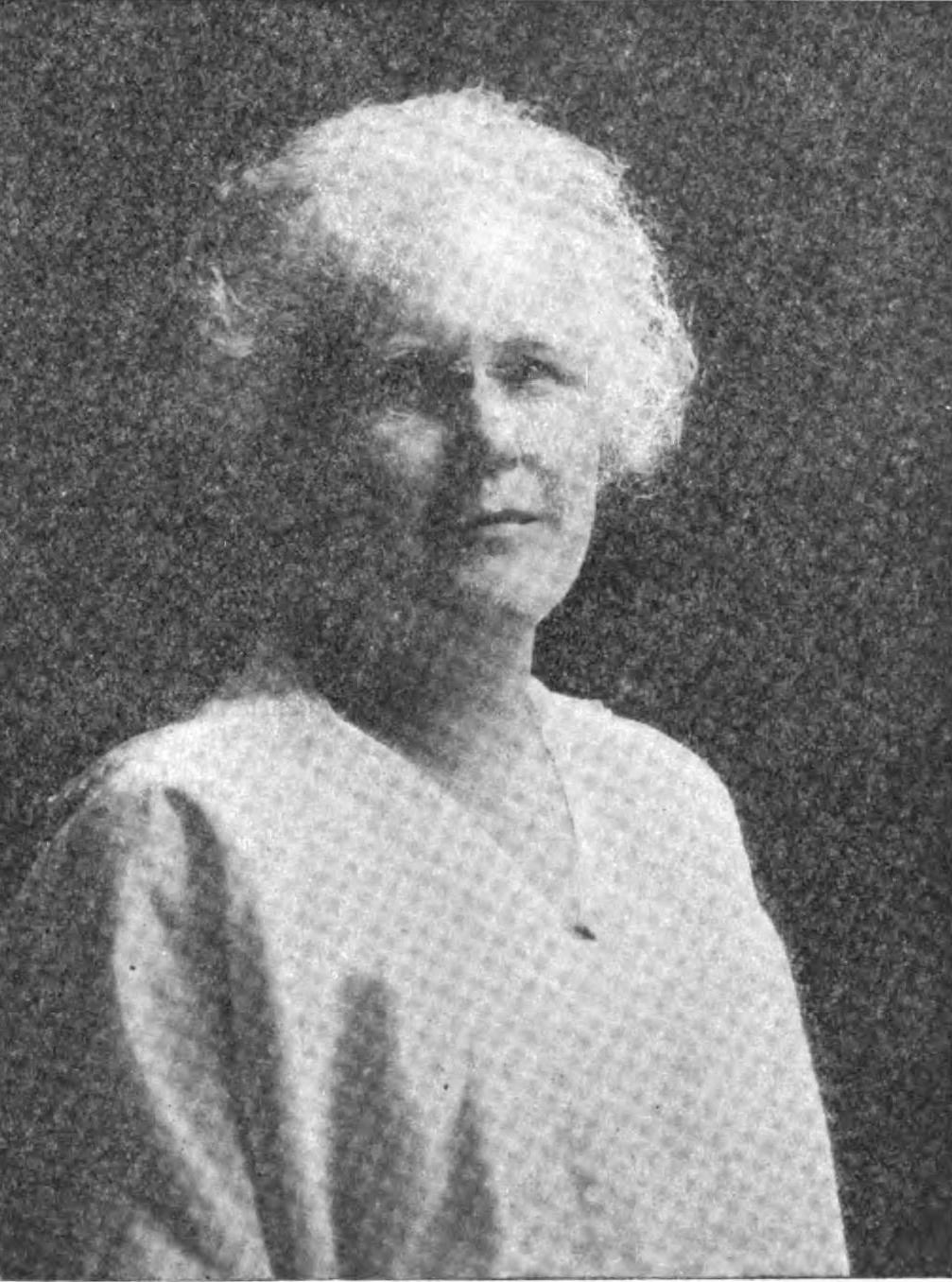

President of the American Library Association
- In office 1920–1921
- Preceded by: Chalmers Hadley
- Succeeded by: Azariah Smith Root

Personal details
- Born: Alice Sarah Tyler; April 27, 1859 Decatur, Illinois, U.S.
- Died: April 18, 1944 (aged 84)
- Education: Armour Institute of Technology
- Occupation: Librarian

Alice Sarah Tyler (April 27, 1859 – April 18, 1944) was an American librarian and advocate.

== Personal life ==
Tyler was born in Decatur, Illinois, to John W. and Sarah Roney Tyler and was a descendant of Presidents James Monroe and John Tyler. She never married and shared an apartment with her friend and colleague Bessie Sargeant-Smith until her death in 1944.

== Career ==
Alice S. Tyler graduated from the Armour Institute of Technology (now the Illinois Institute of Technology) in Chicago in 1894. In 1895 she became the first library school graduate on staff at the Cleveland Public Library, where she worked as head of the Catalog Division. From 1900 to 1913 she served as secretary of the Iowa State Library Commission where she improved existing libraries and established new ones. Reflecting on the legacy of these thirteen years, Stuart (2013) maintains that Tyler "left a state that had a stronger, more fully developed library system. “Under Tyler’s leadership, public libraries in Iowa flourished as she oversaw the education of librarians, the expansion of the traveling library system, and the increase of libraries from 41 to 113" (p. 91). ".

=== Tyler and Carnegie libraries ===
New library buildings, the vast majority of which were funded by grants from Andrew Carnegie, were the most visible aspect of the state’s library growth. Generally, Tyler did not promote Carnegie funding. Instead, it is evident that Tyler came to believe that the Carnegie-funded buildings represented two potential liabilities for Iowa’s communities:

- the buildings were often designed with poor functionality. However, she supported a successful application to Carnegie on the part of Chariton. Chariton Public Library was designed by library specialists Patton & Miller.
- Communities had to agree to provide a subvention of 10% of whatever Carnegie funding was granted for a period of 10 years. For Tyler the stipulation of 10 percent support meant that the libraries were underfunded for further growth and development.

An example of one of the quiet controversies that arose from Andrew Carnegie's cultural mission of funding of libraries occurred in Davenport, Iowa. Here local author Alice French, a personal friend of Carnegie, requested his assistance in the provision of a new library building (a building which has since been demolished because of structural problems). Carnegie empowered his personal secretary, James Bertram, to establish the eligibility requirements for a community to receive funding, which Alice S. Tyler quietly but strongly objected to. Previously, library funding came from local sources which Tyler preferred over outside sources.

In December 1908, she received requests by people in Oklahoma and South Dakota seeking Carnegie grants to fund their library plans and her response to these requests contained important information and relevant publications about the process and advantages of Carnegie funding which she apparently did not provide to Iowa communities. Although Tyler did not openly campaign against the Carnegie grants, she, nevertheless, engaged in a quiet opposition to the communities’ acceptance of them. The conflict of interests between Tyler and the various state officials and community entities agreeing with the Carnegie requirements extended to issues regarding library design, functionality, and services. While Tyler's objections remained muted throughout, she clearly stated her views about the negative consequences of widespread, unmonitored acceptance of the Carnegie grants.

She appears to have had little success in dissuading Iowans from applying for Carnegie grants, as the state´s communities ultimately received the fourth highest number of Carnegie-funded buildings in the country. "Ironically, the development of Iowa’s libraries occurred despite Tyler’s unrelieved misgivings regarding the benefits of Carnegie’s largesse” (p. 106). Stuart (2013) also notes that the provisions of the arrangement between the communities and Carnegie did not define an oversight, consultancy, or approval role for Tyler. In fact, over the years, any suggestions Tyler made about any aspect of the library constructions were ignored, thus her actual influence on the outcome of the Iowa Free Public Libraries Project was minimal.

=== University work ===
She started a summer school at Iowa State University and served as director from 1901 to 1912.

From 1913 she was Director of the School of Library Science at Western Reserve University, Ohio, becoming Dean there from 1925 to her retirement in 1929. Tyler was appointed Dean Emeritus after her retirement.

During her time at Western Reserve University, she became the third woman President of the American Library Association in 1920–1921.

== Publications ==
- Effect of the commission plan of city government on public libraries 1911
- Some aspects of library progress 1921
- Recruiting for library schools 1922
- Education for librarianship: as it is and as it might be 1924
- Library extension: a national responsibility 1928
- The need for more specialized training for the county librarian 1931

== Other accomplishments ==
- Editor of Iowa Library Quarterly 1901-13
- President of the Association of American Library Schools 1918-19
- President of the Library Club of Cleveland and Vicinity 1922-23
- President of the Ohio State Library Association 1922-23
- Member of the League of Women Voters (LWV) of Cleveland
- Member of Citizens League of Greater Cleveland
- President of Women's City Club, Cleveland

Non-profit organization positions
Preceded by Chalmers Hadley	President of the American Library Association; 1920–1921	Succeeded by Azariah Smith Root
