= Suzanne M. Stauffer =

American librarian and academic

Suzanne M. Stauffer (born 1957) is professor emerita, School of Information Studies, Louisiana State University. She is a cultural heritage scholar and historian of libraries focusing on the role of the public library in American society and culture.

== Education and academic career ==
Stauffer holds a Ph. D.in Library and Information Science from the UCLA School of Education and Information Studies University of California, Los Angeles,(2004); M.L.S. Library Science Brigham Young University,(1986); B.S. Psychology Weber State University,(1978)

Her career in professional service included being the Adult Services Reference Librarian at the Long Beach Public Library New York, 1987–1989, the Judaica/Technical Services Librarian, Hebrew Union College-Jewish Institute of Religion, New York City, 1989–1996, the Children's Librarian, County of Los Angeles Public Library, San Fernando Library, 2001–2003.

On 2006, Stauffer was appointed assistant professor at the School of Information Studies at Louisiana State University, and in 2012, she was promoted to associate professor, and to professor in 2020. She held the Russell B. Long professorship in 2014–2016.

She collaborated with Alma Dawson on "Project Recovery: Educating the Next Generation of Librarians for South Louisiana." Stauffer was also a Doctor of Design in Cultural Preservation as an affiliate faculty member in the College of Art & Design at Louisiana State University from 2019 to 2024.

== Professional associations ==
Stauffer held many leadership positions in the Library History Round Table of the American Library Association including chair. She also chaired the Library History Seminar XIV committee in 2021.

She presented papers at the International Federation of Library Associations, Popular Culture Association, Society for the History of Authorship, Reading and Publishing, and the Association for Library and Information Science Education and participated on committees and sections of these associations.

== Mystery Writer ==
Upon retirement from LSU, Stauffer moved on to a third career as a mystery novelist living in Albuquerque, New Mexico.

Stauffer's debut novel, Fried Chicken Castañeda, was published by Artemesia Publishing in May 2025. It won the 2025 New Mexico Book Award for Cozy Mystery and the Bronze Medal in Mystery/Crime/Detection of the Collective of Independent Publishers and Authors.

== Selected academic publications ==
- Stauffer, Suzanne M. ""Correct Provision Can Be Made for Their Wants: The Reading Rooms of the Santa Fe Railroad." Library & Information History, 39(1): 1-22, 2023.
- Stauffer, Suzanne M. "The Ancient World;" "The Influence of the Muslim World on the West (610-1299);" "Muslim Spain (Al-Andalus) (711-1492);" "Twentieth Century Libraries." In Libraries, Archives, and Museums: History & Theory of Cultural Heritage Institutions in the West. Edited by Suzanne M. Stauffer. Rowman & Littlefield, 2021.
- Stauffer, Suzanne M. "Historical Research" in Research Methods for Librarians and Educators: Practical Applications in Formal and Informal Learning Environments. Edited by Ruth V. Small and Marcia Mardis. Santa Barbara: ABC CLIO, 2017.
- Stauffer, Suzanne M. "The Band of American Ladies : Children’s Librarians and the Creation of Children’s Literature in the Long 19th Century." Nineteenth-Century Gender Studies, 18(2), http://ncgsjournal.com/issue182/stauffer.html.
- Stauffer, Suzanne M. "An Emergency Job Well Done": Friends of Freedom Libraries and the Mississippi Freedom Libraries." Libraries: Culture, History, and Society, 2021. 5(1): 102-128. doi.org/10.5325/libraries.5.1.0102
- Stauffer, Suzanne M. "Marilla Waite Freeman: The Librarian as Literary Muse, Gatekeeper, and Disseminator of Print Culture." Library & Information History, 35(3): 151–167.2021. DOI: 10.1080/17583489.2019.1668156
- Stauffer, Suzanne M. "Let Us Forget this Cherishing of Women in Library Work: Women in the American Library War Service, 1918-1920." Libraries: Culture, History, and Society 3(2): 155–174.2019.
- Stauffer, Suzanne M. "Libraries are the Homes of Books: Whiteness in the Construction of School Libraries." Libraries: Culture, History and Society 1(2):194-212.2017.
- Stauffer, Suzanne M. "Supplanting the Saloon Evil and Other Loafing Habits: Utah’s Library-Gymnasium Movement, 1907-1912." Library Quarterly: Information, Community, Policy, 86(4):434–448. 2016.
- Stauffer, Suzanne M. "The Dangers of Unlimited Access: Fiction, the Internet and the Social Construction of Childhood." Library & Information Science Research, 36(3/4):154-162. 2014.
- Stauffer, Suzanne M. "A Good Social Work: Women’s Clubs, Libraries, and the Construction of a Secular Society in Utah, 1890-1920." Libraries and the Cultural Record, 46(2):135-55. 2011.

== Mystery Novel ==
Stauffer, Suzanne M. 2025. Fried Chicken Castañeda. Tijeras, New Mexico: Artemesia Publishing.
