= Charles Harvey Brown =

American librarian (1875–1960)

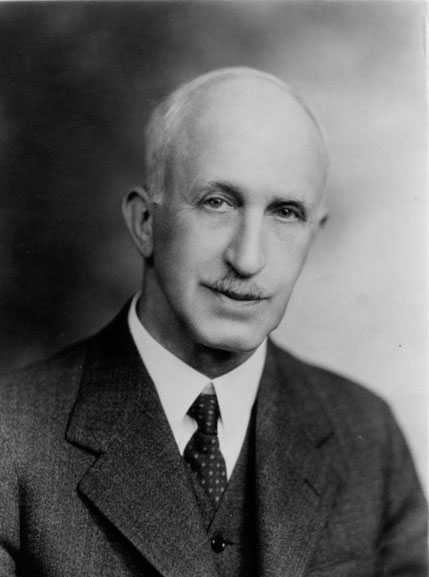
- Brown c. 1940

President of the American Library Association
- In office 1941–1942
- Preceded by: Essae Martha Culver
- Succeeded by: Keyes D. Metcalf

Personal details
- Born: December 23, 1875 Albany, New York, US
- Died: January 19, 1960 (aged 84)
- Education: Wesleyan University
- Occupation: Librarian

Military service
- Allegiance: United States
- Branch/service: United States Navy
- Years of service: 1919–1922

Charles Harvey Brown (December 23, 1875 – January 19, 1960) was an American librarian and leader in the American Library Association. He received a bachelor's degree from Wesleyan University in 1897 and a master's degree in 1899. He went on to receive a second bachelor's degree in Library Science at the New York State Library School in 1901. He later received a Literary Doctorate from Wesleyan University in 1937. He worked at Wesleyan University from 1897 to 1899 and the Library of Congress from 1901 to 1903. Brown worked for the John Crerar Library from 1903 to 1909 and the Brooklyn Public Library from 1909 to 1919.

Brown joined the United States Navy in 1919, leaving the service in 1922 to work for the Iowa State College Library. Brown directed the Iowa State University Library from 1922 to 1946 until he retired and was named Librarian Emeritus.

He was president of the American Library Association from 1941 to 1942. Brown helped to form the Association of Research Libraries and in 1932, and the Association of College and Research Libraries in 1938.

In 1947 the journal, College & Research Libraries published essays in his honor.

He helped to organize the National Diet Library in Japan.

In 1954 Brown was awarded American Library Association Honorary Membership.

== Publications ==
- Scientific serials (Association of College and Reference Libraries, 1956)
- List of titles on municipal government, with special reference to city charters and to local conditions in Chicago (Chicago, City Club, 1906)

Non-profit organization positions
Preceded by Essae Martha Culver	President of the American Library Association; 1941–1942	Succeeded by Keyes D. Metcalf
