= Exeter, California =

City in California, United States

- City
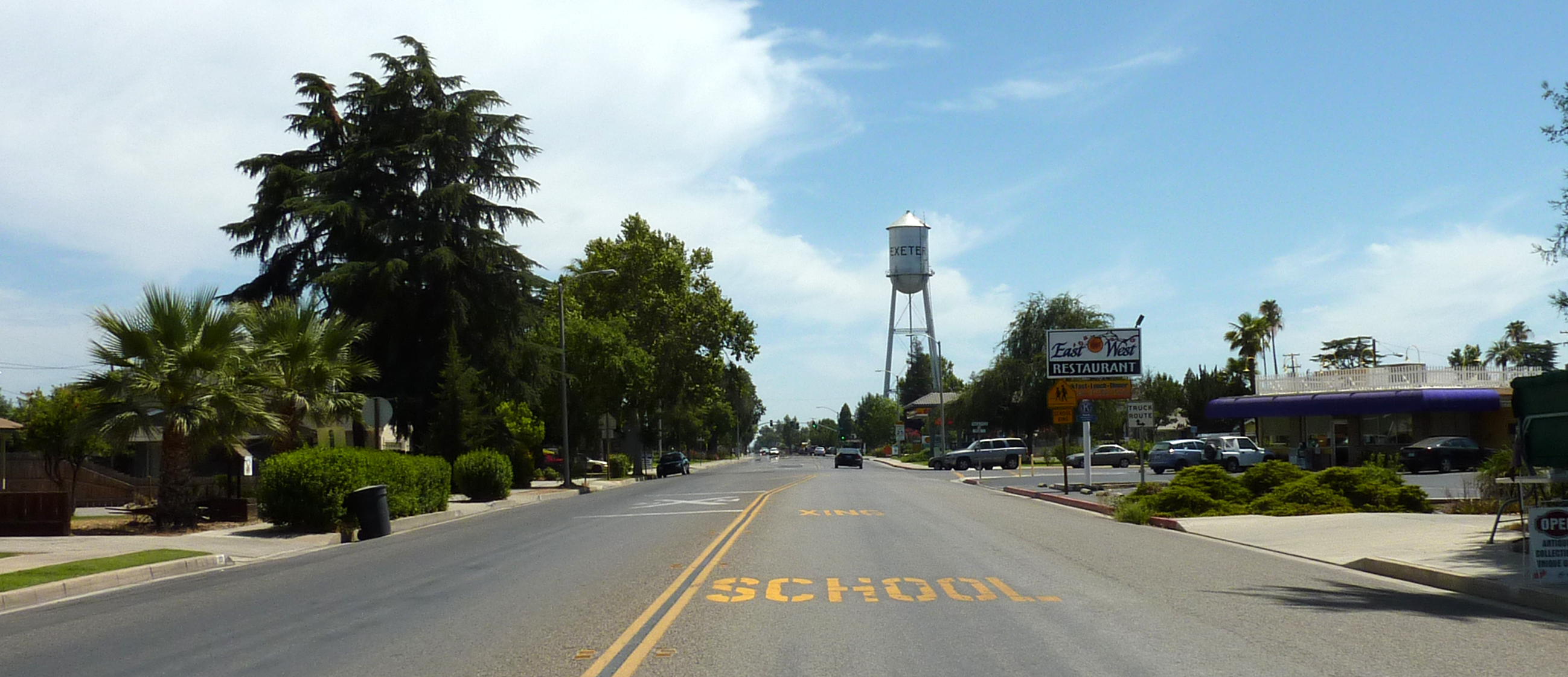
- CA Hwy 65 through Exeter

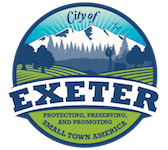
- Seal
- Motto: Citrus Capital of the World
- Interactive map of Exeter, California
- Location in California Location in the United States
- Coordinates: 36°17′39″N 119°8′34″W
- Country: United States
- State: California
- County: Tulare
- Incorporated: March 2, 1911
- Named for: Exeter

Government
  - Type: Council-Manager
  - City council: Mayor Jacob Johnson; Jeff Wilson; Vicki Riddle; Frankie Alves; Bobbie Lentz
  - City administrator: Jason Ridenour

Area
  - City: 2.46 sq mi (6.37 km^{2})
  - Land: 2.46 sq mi (6.37 km^{2})
  - Water: 0 sq mi (0.00 km^{2}) 0%
- Elevation: 390 ft (119 m)

Population (2020)
  - City: 10,321
  - Estimate (2024): 10,186
  - Density: 4,200/sq mi (1,620/km^{2})
  - Metro: 473,117
- Time zone: UTC-8 (Pacific)
  - Summer (DST): UTC-7 (PDT)
- ZIP code: 93221
- Area code: 559
- FIPS code: 06-23126
- GNIS feature ID: 1652707
- Website: cityofexeter.ca.gov

Exeter is a city in Tulare County, California, United States. It is situated in the San Joaquin Valley near the foothills of the Sierra Nevada. The population was 10,321 at the 2020 census, down from 10,334 at the 2010 census.

Exeter is located on State Highway 65, 2 miles (3.2 km) south of Highway 198 and 15 miles (24 km) east of Highway 99.

== History ==
Before the arrival of European settlers, Yokuts settled around an area in an oak forest two miles north of Exeter. The current town site was a plain that possessed elk, antelope, frogs, and deer. Rocky Hill, to the east of the city, offered shelter to native tribes when the plain flooded. Several caves on the hill contain petroglyphs, though some of the most important of these were destroyed by local vandals/looters and poorly managed and unsupervised steer.

The town site traces its roots to the construction of a railroad line through the San Joaquin Valley, by 1888 a line passed through the area. A representative of the Southern Pacific Railroad, D.W. Parkhurst, purchased the land from an early settler, John Firebaugh, and formed the town which he named after his own hometown of Exeter, England.

The damming of the Kaweah valley during the 1930s provided a reliable source of water for agriculture. Cattle ranching grew at the beginning of the 20th century, led by the Gill Cattle Company, which opened in the late 1800s and was once the largest such business in the United States. The town incorporated in 1911. In October 1929, Exeter was the site of a large Anti-Filipino race riot. A mob stormed a Filipino work camp, bludgeoning 50 Filipino laborers and burning their camp to the ground. This race-riot sparked a wave of Anti-Filipino hatred.

Professional artists depicting the history of the area have painted huge murals on exterior walls throughout the downtown area. There are currently 31 murals in this outdoor art gallery.

== Geography ==
According to the United States Census Bureau, the city has a total area of 2.5 square miles (6.5 km^{2}), all land.

=== Climate ===
Exeter, California

Climate chart (precipitation, max. and min. temperature)
J	F	M	A	M	J	J	A	S	O	N	D
2.4 58 36	2.3 65 39	2.6 70 42	0.9 77 45	0.4 85 51	0.1 93 57	0 98 61	0 96 60	0.3 91 55	0.7 81 47	1.3 67 39	1.5 58 34
- █ Average max. and min. temperatures in °F
- █ Precipitation totals in inches
- Source: Weather.com / NWS
Metric conversion
J	F	M	A	M	J	J	A	S	O	N	D
62 14 2	57 18 4	65 21 6	23 25 7	10 29 11	3.3 34 14	0.3 37 16	0.5 36 16	8.6 33 13	17 27 8	34 19 4	38 14 1
- █ Average max. and min. temperatures in °C
- █ Precipitation totals in mm

== Demographics ==
Historical population
Census	Pop.	Note	%±
1920	1,852		—
1930	2,685		45.0%
1940	3,883		44.6%
1950	4,078		5.0%
1960	4,264		4.6%
1970	4,475		4.9%
1980	5,606		25.3%
1990	7,276		29.8%
2000	9,168		26.0%
2010	10,334		12.7%
2020	10,321		−0.1%
2024 (est.)	10,186	▼	−1.3%
U.S. Decennial Census

=== 2020 census ===
As of the 2020 census, Exeter had a population of 10,321 and a population density of 4,193.8 inhabitants per square mile (1,619.2/km^{2}). The median age was 35.0 years. The age distribution was 27.1% under the age of 18, 9.7% aged 18 to 24, 26.1% aged 25 to 44, 22.1% aged 45 to 64, and 15.1% who were 65 years of age or older. For every 100 females, there were 93.9 males, and for every 100 females age 18 and over, there were 90.6 males age 18 and over.

The census reported that 99.6% of the population lived in households, 0.3% lived in non-institutionalized group quarters, and 0.1% were institutionalized. Additionally, 99.8% of residents lived in urban areas, while 0.2% lived in rural areas.

There were 3,487 households, out of which 42.2% had children under the age of 18 living in them. Of all households, 48.0% were married-couple households, 9.1% were cohabiting couple households, 28.1% had a female householder with no spouse or partner present, and 14.9% had a male householder with no spouse or partner present. About 20.5% of households were made up of individuals, and 10.8% had someone living alone who was 65 years of age or older. The average household size was 2.95, and there were 2,577 families (73.9% of all households).

There were 3,667 housing units at an average density of 1,490.0 units per square mile (575.3 units/km^{2}), of which 3,487 (95.1%) were occupied and 4.9% were vacant. Of occupied units, 60.7% were owner-occupied and 39.3% were occupied by renters. The homeowner vacancy rate was 2.1%, and the rental vacancy rate was 3.6%.

Racial composition as of the 2020 census
Race	Number	Percent
White	5,604	54.3%
Black or African American	65	0.6%
American Indian and Alaska Native	295	2.9%
Asian	148	1.4%
Native Hawaiian and Other Pacific Islander	17	0.2%
Some other race	2,706	26.2%
Two or more races	1,486	14.4%
Hispanic or Latino (of any race)	5,287	51.2%

=== 2023 ACS estimates ===
In 2023, the US Census Bureau estimated that the median household income was $71,198, and the per capita income was $35,747. About 15.6% of families and 17.2% of the population were below the poverty line.

=== 2010 census ===
At the 2010 census Exeter had a population of 10,334. The population density was 4,195.6 inhabitants per square mile (1,619.9/km^{2}). The racial makeup of Exeter was 7,150 (69.2%) White, 67 (0.6%) African American, 171 (1.7%) Native American, 138 (1.3%) Asian, 8 (0.1%) Pacific Islander, 2,416 (23.4%) from other races, and 384 (3.7%) from two or more races. Hispanic or Latino of any race were 4,703 persons (45.5%).

The census reported that 10,261 people (99.3% of the population) lived in households, 57 (0.6%) lived in non-institutionalized group quarters, and 16 (0.2%) were institutionalized.

There were 3,378 households, 1,552 (45.9%) had children under the age of 18 living in them, 1,801 (53.3%) were opposite-sex married couples living together, 575 (17.0%) had a female householder with no husband present, 227 (6.7%) had a male householder with no wife present. There were 233 (6.9%) unmarried opposite-sex partnerships, and 12 (0.4%) same-sex married couples or partnerships. 652 households (19.3%) were one person and 313 (9.3%) had someone living alone who was 65 or older. The average household size was 3.04. There were 2,603 families (77.1% of households); the average family size was 3.45.

The age distribution was 3,285 people (31.8%) under the age of 18, 1,020 people (9.9%) aged 18 to 24, 2,586 people (25.0%) aged 25 to 44, 2,255 people (21.8%) aged 45 to 64, and 1,188 people (11.5%) who were 65 or older. The median age was 31.2 years. For every 100 females, there were 94.5 males. For every 100 females age 18 and over, there were 90.4 males.

There were 3,600 housing units at an average density of 1,461.6 per square mile, of the occupied units 2,036 (60.3%) were owner-occupied and 1,342 (39.7%) were rented. The homeowner vacancy rate was 3.4%; the rental vacancy rate was 6.3%. 6,111 people (59.1% of the population) lived in owner-occupied housing units and 4,150 people (40.2%) lived in rental housing units.

== Economy ==
Major employers in Exeter include Waterman Industries, Svenhard's Swedish Bakery and Peninsula Packaging.

== Government ==
=== Local government ===
The current mayor is Jacob Johnson.

=== State and federal ===
In the California State Legislature, Exeter is in the 12th senatorial district, represented by Republican Shannon Grove, and in the 32nd Assembly district, represented by Republican Stan Ellis.

In the United States House of Representatives, Exeter is in California's 21st congressional district, represented by Democrat Jim Costa.

== Education ==
The city is served by the Exeter Unified School District for grades PK-12.

Exeter USD consists of: Exeter Union High School (9–12), the Wilson Middle School (6–8), Rocky Hill Elementary (K-5), Lincoln Elementary (K-5) and Kaweah High School (a continuation high school). The 1999-2000 enrollment was: grades K-8, 1,936 and grades 9–12, 1101 students.

== Notable people ==
- Joseph James DeAngelo, convicted as the Golden State Killer and the Visalia Ransacker in 2020, was a police officer in Exeter. from 1973 to 1976, same time as when the Ransacker crimes occurred in neighbouring Visalia.
- William DeGrado, entrepreneur and biochemist, born in Exeter.
- Kenny Guinn, former Republican governor of Nevada.
- Satoshi Hirayama, former baseball star for Hiroshima Toyo Carp, born and raised in Exeter.
- Robert List, former Republican governor of Nevada.
- Brad Mills, former player and coach of Major League Baseball.
- Jim Qualls, former Major League Baseball outfielder for the Chicago Cubs.
- Jeriome Robertson, former baseball pitcher with Houston Astros and Cleveland Indians, grew up and died in Exeter.
- Ron Robinson, former Major League Baseball pitcher for the Cincinnati Reds and the Milwaukee Brewers.

== Gallery ==
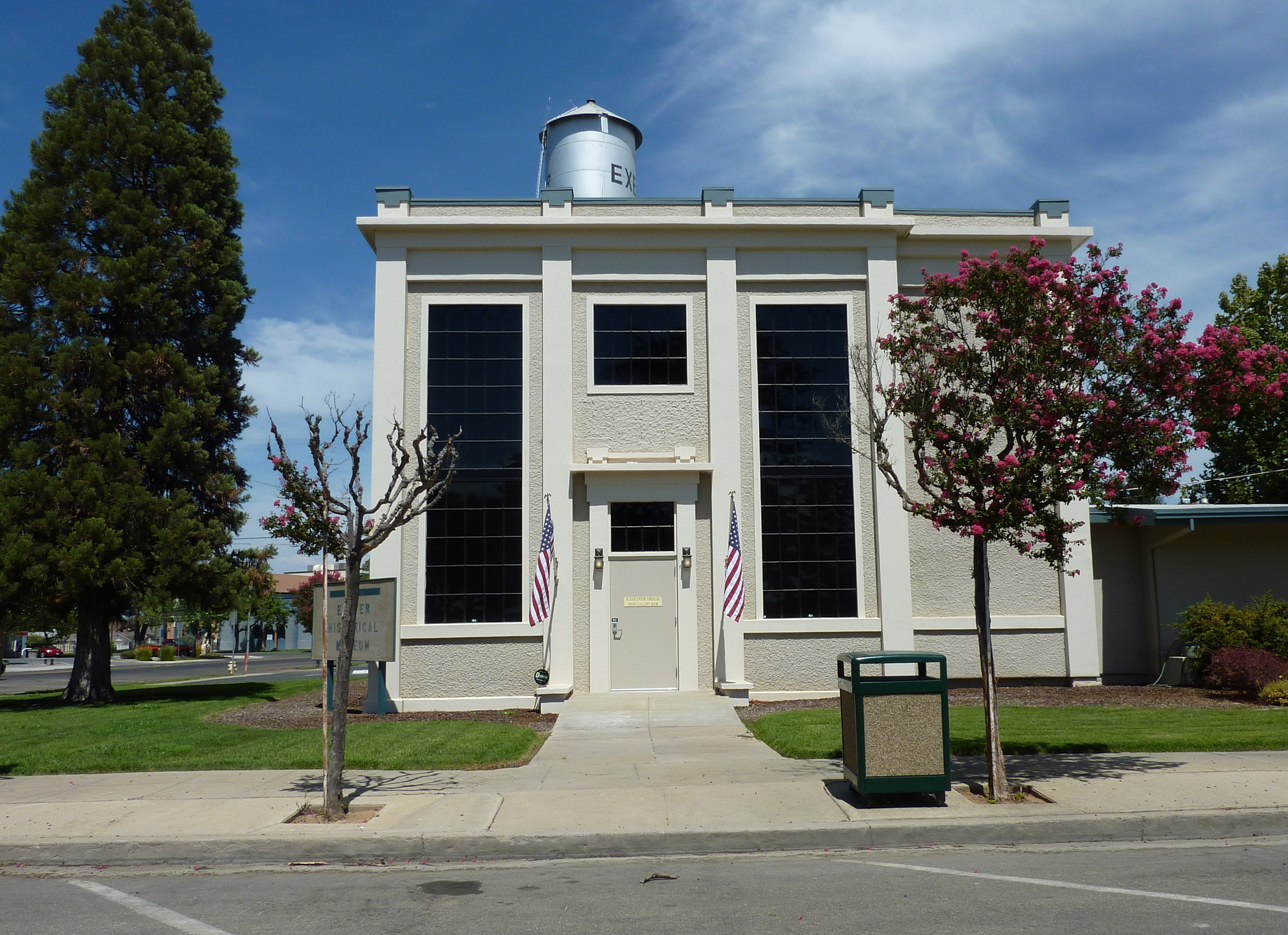
The Exeter Historical Museum is housed in the old Mt. Whitney Power Company Substation, formerly the headquarters of the Exeter Police Department.

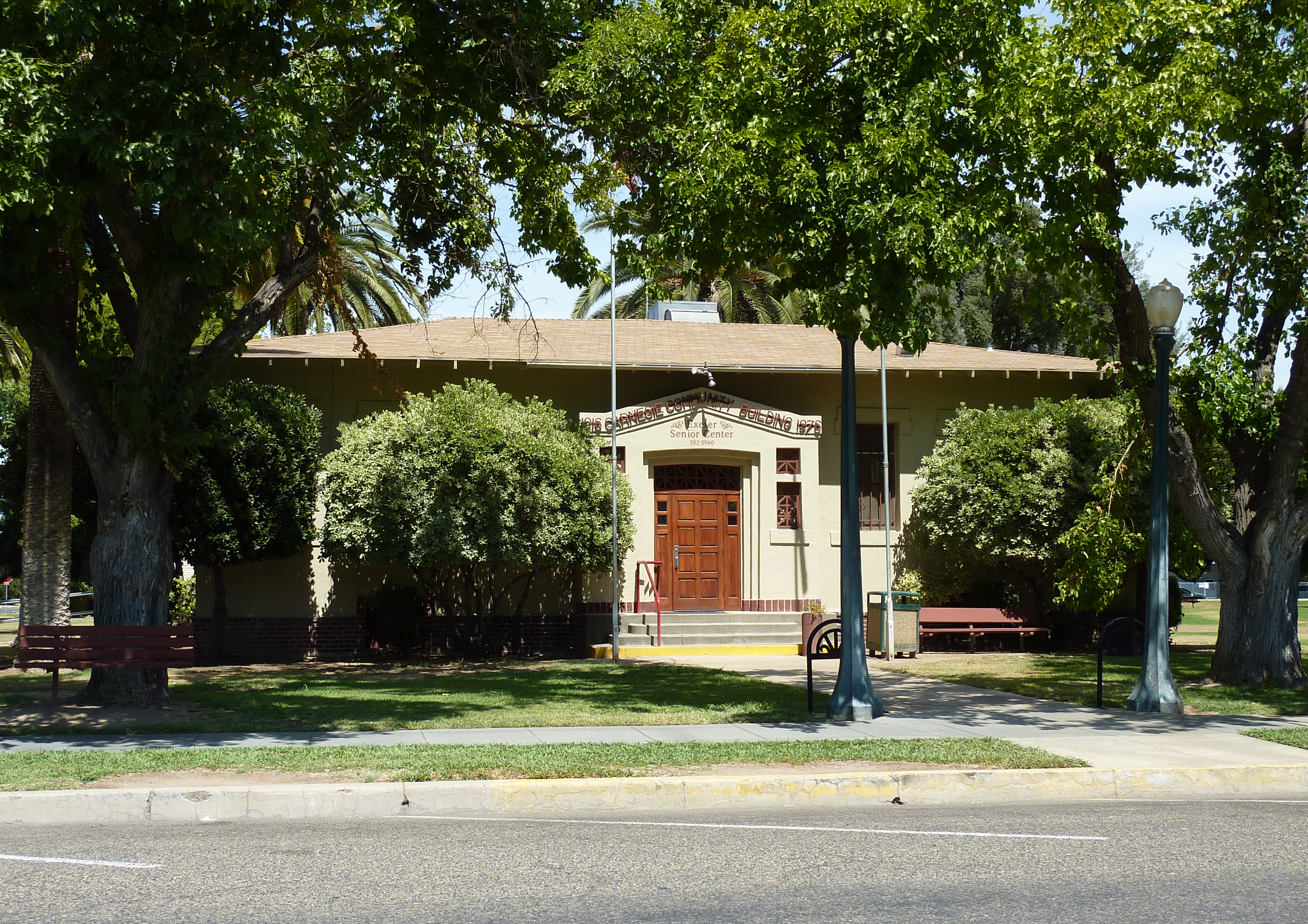
The Exeter Public Library building, a Carnegie library, is on the National Register of Historic Places; it now serves as a community center.

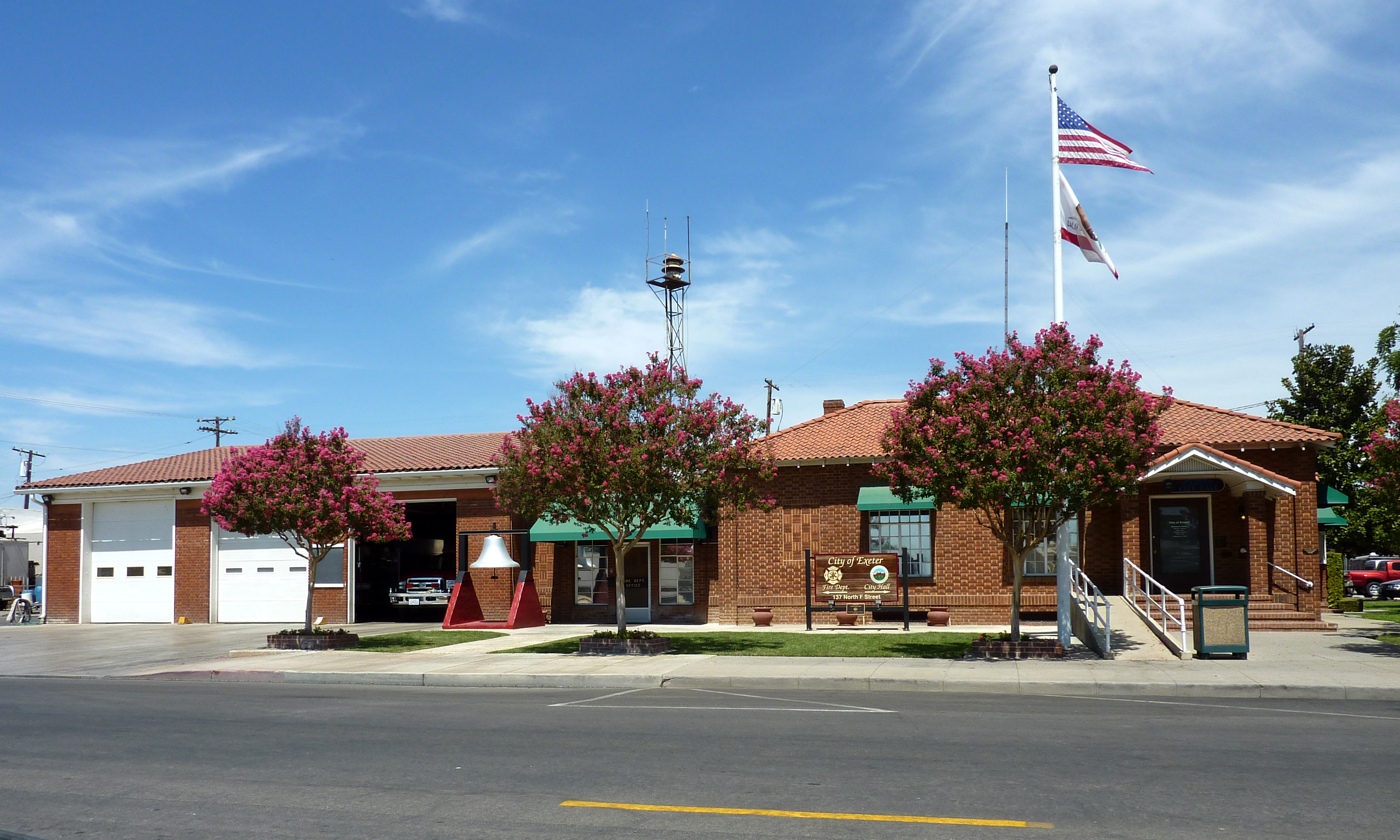
City Hall and Fire Department
