= Oberlin College Library =

Academic library system in Oberlin, Ohio

Oberlin College Libraries
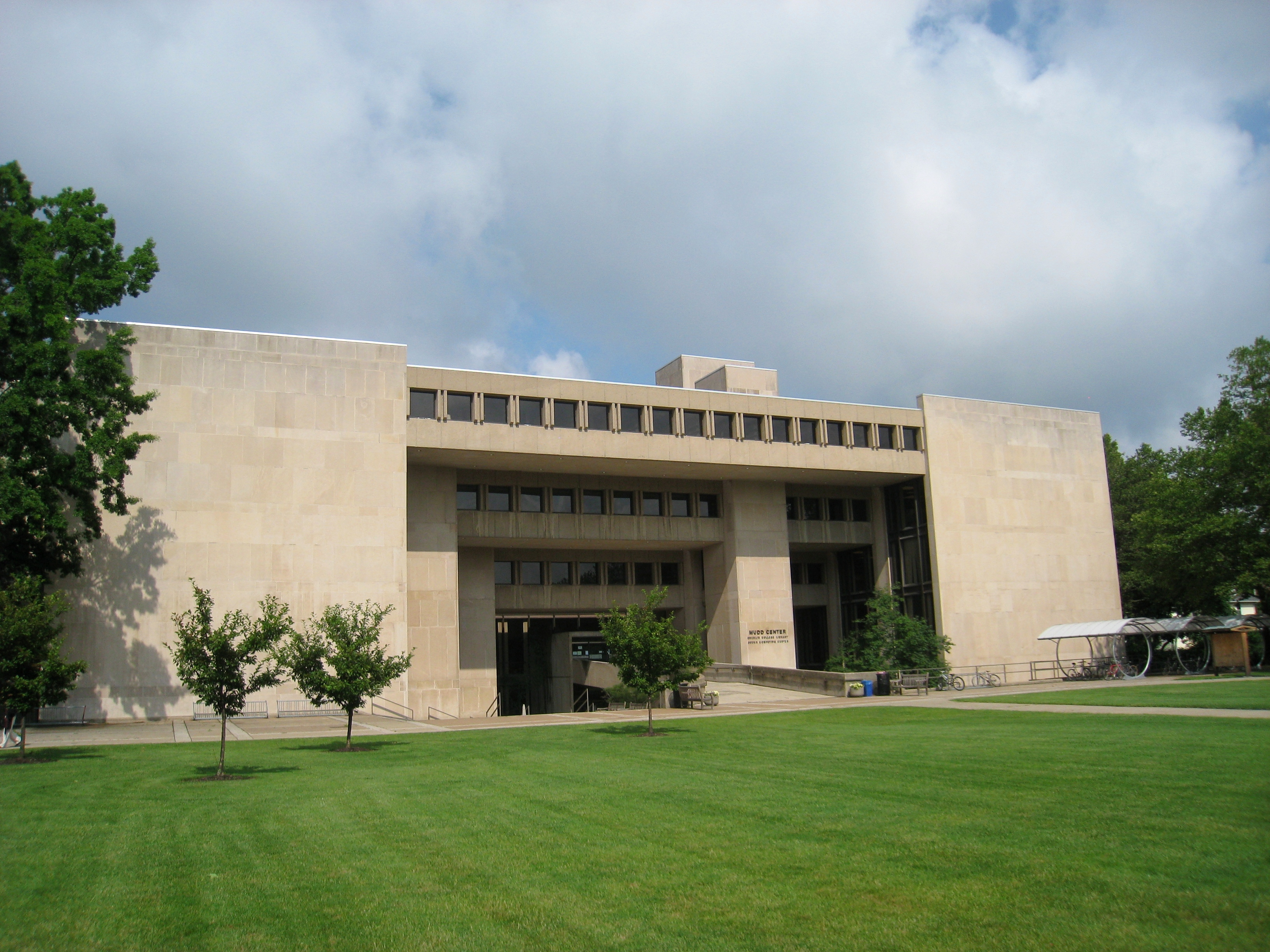
- 41.293714°N 82.216782°W
- Location: Oberlin College; 148 West College Street; Oberlin, Ohio 44074 United States
- Type: Academic library
- Established: 1833

Other information
- Director: Dr. Valerie Hotchkiss
- Website: libraries.oberlin.edu

The Oberlin College Libraries (OCL) is a system of libraries located in Oberlin, Ohio comprising the Mary Church Terrell Main Library, Clarence Ward Art Library, Conservatory Library, and Science Library.

The recipient of the ACRL Excellence in Academic Libraries Award in 2002, the Oberlin College Libraries are recognized for superior collections and services. The library system has more than 2.4 million items of print and media materials, as well as extensive online journals and research databases. OCL is a member of the OhioLINK consortium which provides rapid access to an additional 50 million volumes from colleges and universities across Ohio. On October 6, 2018, the Main Library located in the Mudd Center, was renamed for Oberlin graduate Mary Church Terrell (class of 1884, 1888, and Hon. 1948), who is held in high esteem because she was one of the first African-American women to earn a college degree

== History ==
Under the leadership of college librarian Azariah Smith Root (1887–1927), the Oberlin College Library grew by the end of his tenure to the sixteenth largest academic library in the nation. The former central library, which was funded by Andrew Carnegie, opened in 1908 and served both the college and the town of Oberlin for almost seven decades. The current main library in Mudd Center opened in 1974. The Oberlin College Library, under the direction of Library Director Eileen Thornton, was a founding member of OCLC and under the direction of Ray English was the first independent college library to join the OhioLINK consortium.

The Oberlin College Library went under a name change from "library" to "libraries" in 2017 under the direction of Alexia Hudson-Ward (the second woman and first person of color to lead the libraries). This change highlighted the system's distinctiveness of being one of the few liberal arts college library systems with four libraries in the nation. Hudson-Ward also led the naming of the Mary Church Terrell Main Library in October 2018.

The library directors of the Oberlin Group, a national consortium of selective liberal arts college libraries, first met at Oberlin College in 1986.

== Facilities and Services ==
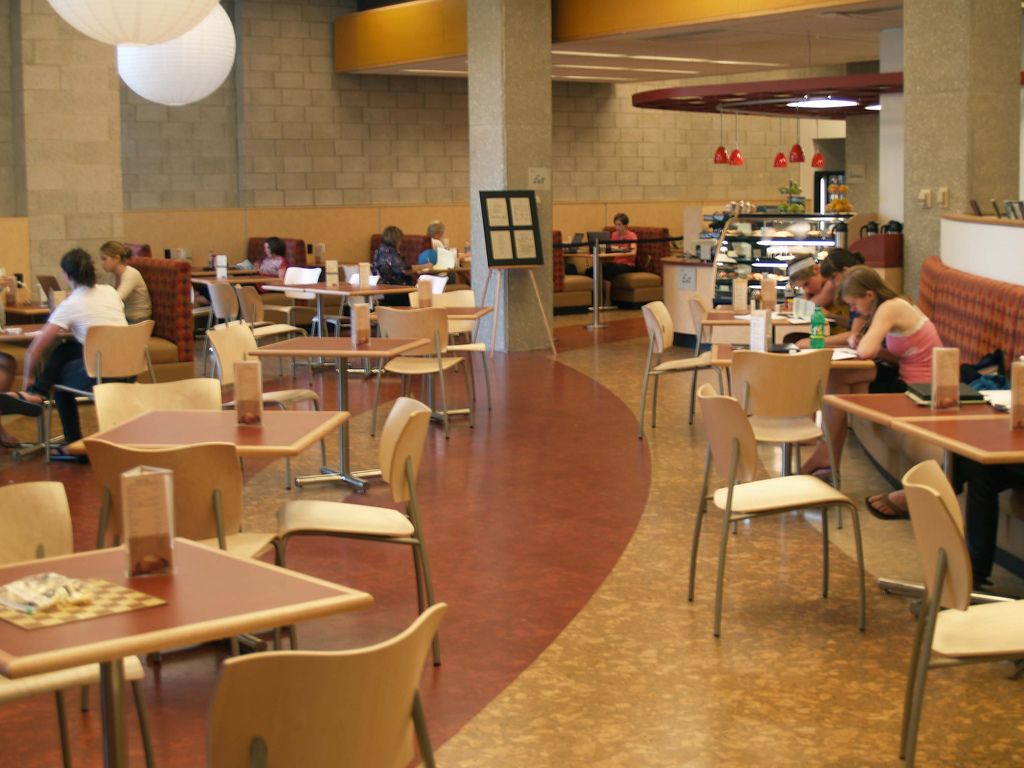
Azariah's Café in the Academic Commons.

The Mary Church Terrell Main library, located in Mudd Center, houses the social sciences and humanities collections, special collections, and the Oberlin College Archives. The library system also encompasses the Conservatory Library, the Clarence Ward Art Library, the Science Library, and a central storage facility. The Academic Commons on the main level of Mudd Center opened in 2007 and was dedicated as the Robert S. Lemle ‘75 and Roni Kohen-Lemle ‘76 Academic Commons in 2011. It is a hub of social and academic activity, with spaces for collaborative work and tutoring, in-depth research appointments, learning support services, and technology support in partnership with the Center for Information Technology. The Academic Commons features an electronic classroom, Azariah's Café, computer workstations, six group study rooms, circulation and reference services, and the Writing Center.
