= Herman H. B. Meyer =

American librarian

President of the American Library Association
- In office 1924–1925
- Preceded by: Judson Toll Jennings
- Succeeded by: Charles F. D. Belden

Personal details
- Born: October 17, 1864 New York City, New York, USA
- Died: January 16, 1937 (aged 72)
- Education: Pratt Institute
- Occupation: Librarian

Herman Henry Bernard Meyer (1864 – January 16, 1937) was an American librarian. Meyer attended the Pratt Institute Library School. He worked in several positions at the Library of Congress, including the Head of the Newspaper and Periodical Division (1907), the Chief Bibliographer (1914-1920), and the Head of the Legislative Reference Service (1921-1935) and initiated the Library's services for the blind.

He was president of the American Library Association from 1924 to 1925 and the Bibliographical Society of America from 1926-1929.

Non-profit organization positions
| Preceded by Judson Toll Jennings | President of the American Library Association; 1924–1925 | Succeeded by Charles F. D. Belden |
