= George Locke =

Canadian librarian

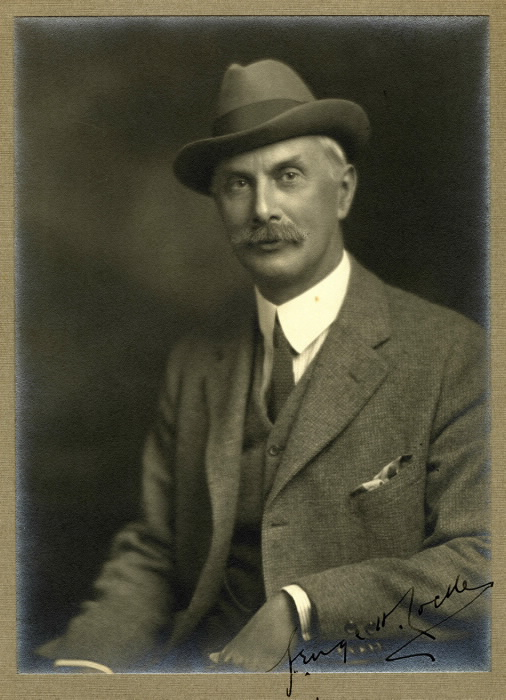

President of the American Library Association
- In office 1926–1927
- Preceded by: Charles F. D. Belden
- Succeeded by: Carl B. Roden

Personal details
- Born: George Herbert Locke; March 29, 1870 Beamsville, Ontario, Canada
- Died: January 28, 1937 (aged 66) Toronto, Ontario, Canada
- Education: Victoria College, Toronto
- Occupation: Librarian

George Herbert Locke (March 29, 1870 – January 28, 1937) was a Canadian librarian. He was chief librarian of the Toronto Public Library from 1908 until his death, a time of great expansion in that library system. In 1926–1927 he became the second Canadian to be president of the American Library Association. The George H. Locke Memorial Branch of the Toronto Public Library, which opened in 1949, is named after him.

== Early life and education ==
Locke was born in Beamsville, Ontario, on March 29, 1870, and was educated at Ryerson Public School in Toronto, Brampton High School, and Collingwood Collegiate Institute. He studied at Victoria College, and graduated from the University of Toronto in 1893.

== Career ==
After graduating, Locke taught as a professor of ancient history at the University of Toronto, and continued to teach at other colleges in subsequent years. He served as editor of the School Review while at the University of Chicago, and also wrote books on Canadian history. He was a member of the Arts and Letters Club of Toronto, and served as its president from 1910 to 1912.

In 1930, Locke, along with Mary J. L. Black and John Ridington, were hired as part of a commission of inquiry into the conditions of Canadian public libraries. The commissioners toured Canada to visit and report on local libraries. The commission concluded in 1933 with the publication of Libraries in Canada: A Study of Library Conditions and Needs.

By 1930, Toronto's public library system was recognized as one of the best in North America, and Locke's reputation as a visionary leader had vaulted him to the presidency of the American Library Association.

== Death ==
Locke died on January 28, 1937, in Toronto. He was survived by his wife Grace Moore Locke.

== Bibliography ==
- Builders of the Canadian Commonwealth. 1923.
- The education of a people: the inaugural lecture delivered at Macdonald College. 1908.
- English History (ALA: Reading with a purpose). 1930.
- Libraries in Canada: a study of library conditions and needs. 1933.
- When Canada Was New France. 1919.

Non-profit organization positions
Preceded by Charles F. D. Belden	President of the American Library Association; 1926–1927	Succeeded by Carl B. Roden
