= Essae Martha Culver =

American librarian

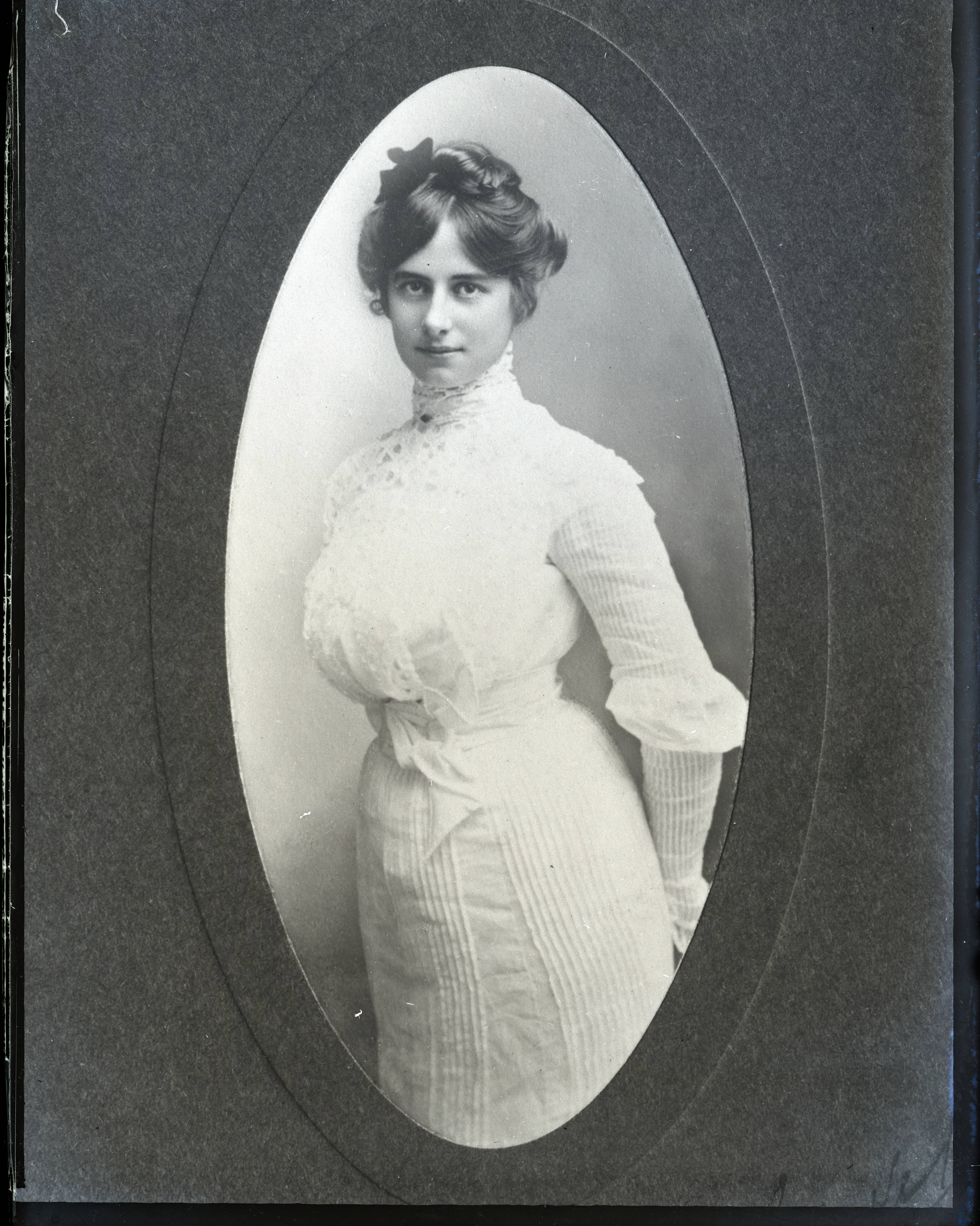
- Culver in 1904

President of the American Library Association
- In office 1940–1941
- Preceded by: Ralph Munn
- Succeeded by: Charles Harvey Brown

Personal details
- Born: November 15, 1882 Emporia, Kansas, USA
- Died: January 3, 1973 (aged 90) Baton Rouge, Louisiana, US
- Education: Pomona College
- Occupation: Librarian

Essae Martha Culver (November 15, 1882 – January 3, 1973) was an American librarian, the first state librarian of Louisiana and president of the American Library Association.

== Early life ==
Culver was born in Emporia, Kansas to Joseph Franklin Culver and Mary Murphy Culver. She was the youngest in a family of four boys and four girls. She graduated from Pomona College in Claremont, California in 1905 with a major in piano and voice. Working in the college library led to an interest in librarianship. She attended the New York State Library School from 1907 to 1908 but left that program early to join the Public Library of Salem, Oregon.

== Library career ==
Culver worked with rural libraries in Oregon for two years before accepting a job in California in 1914. From 1914 to 1925, Culver held a variety of positions with the California State Library and in county libraries across the state. Culver became familiar with developing and working in rural libraries as both the Oregon and California library systems had both developed a model for rural library development. Particularly in California, a model had emerged from innovative legislation, enacted in 1909 and 1911, which provided for a state library at the apex of a network of highly visible libraries spread throughout each county. Culver's familiarity with this model equipped her to undertake the development of rural libraries in other states, such as Louisiana.

In 1925 the American Library Association (ALA) became interested in supporting the development of libraries in Louisiana and provided a three-year grant of $50,000.00 to promote the development of libraries and the creation of a library commission. Louisiana was chosen out of twelve competing states. The ALA grant, or the Carnegie grant, was offered formally by Milton Ferguson at this Louisiana Library Commission meeting to develop a model of modern library service in the South. The Louisiana Library Commission selected forty-two-year-old librarian, Essae Martha Culver to aid the commission. Culver was familiar with the rural library system which the Louisiana Library Commission sought to replicate.

In the summer of 1925, she moved to Baton Rouge, Louisiana to be the executive secretary of the Louisiana Library Commission. She was later named the first state librarian of Louisiana. The Louisiana Library Commission took Culver's advice and recommendations and decided to establish one demonstration library in a northern Louisiana parish and another in the southern part of the state. Culver directed a project to establish public libraries in rural Louisiana, funded by a grant of $50,000 from the Carnegie Corporation.

After Culver's arrival in Louisiana, she received a letter from Louisiana lawyer J.O. Modisette who wanted to offer his services in any way possible. Culver accepted his offer as she had identified shortcomings in the existing library law. Modisette was a licensed California lawyer, and his familiarity with both Louisiana and California laws was a benefit since the development of rural libraries in Louisiana was modeled on that of California. Culver and Modisette continued their working relationship until his death in 1942. Modisette served as the Louisiana Library Commission's chairman.

Culver also worked to establish a library school at Louisiana State University.

Culver was elected president of the Louisiana Library Association in 1928, and the organization named its highest award for her in 1964 which "Honors a librarian whose professional service and achievements, whose leadership in Louisiana association work, and whose lifetime accomplishments in a field of librarianship within the state merit recognition of particular value to Louisiana librarianship."

She was president of the League of Library Commissions and the Southwestern Library Association. She was also the seventh woman president of the American Library Association and served from 1940 to 1941.

Culver collected bookplates and a web exhibit at Library History Buff displays many of these.

Culver retired in 1962 and she died in Baton Rouge on January 3, 1973, of respiratory failure.

== Awards and honors ==
- Joseph W. Lippincott Award for distinguished librarianship (1959)
- Honorary doctorates from Pomona College and Louisiana State University
- "California Library Hall of Fame: Essae Martha Culver". California Library Association. California Library Association. 2013

Non-profit organization positions
Preceded by Ralph Munn	President of the American Library Association; 1940–1941	Succeeded by Charles Harvey Brown
