= Azariah Smith Root =

American librarian and educator

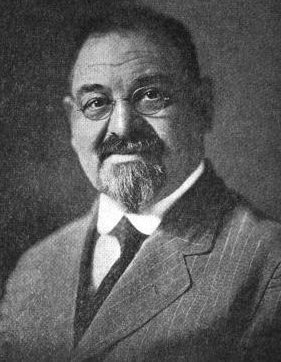

President of the American Library Association
- In office 1921–1922
- Preceded by: Alice S. Tyler
- Succeeded by: George Burwell Utley

Personal details
- Born: February 3, 1862 Middlefield, Massachusetts, US
- Died: October 2, 1927 (aged 65) Oberlin, Ohio, US
- Education: Oberlin College; Boston University; Harvard University; University of Göttingen
- Occupation: Librarian

Azariah Smith Root (February 3, 1862 – October 2, 1927) was an American librarian and educator. Root earned both bachelor's and master's degrees from Oberlin College in 1884 and 1887 respectively. He went on to study law at Boston University from 1884 to 1885 and at Harvard University from 1886 to 1887. Later, Root studied library science and bibliography at the University of Göttingen from 1888 to 1889. Root returned to Oberlin College in 1890 as the library director and a professor of bibliography, positions he would hold until his death.

== Career ==
During his tenure at Oberlin, Root became the premier spokesperson for college librarianship during his era. He led the growth of Oberlin's collection through gifts and exchange programs and by 1924 had established Oberlin's library as the largest college library in the nation. Root was also a leader in the library profession. He was a founding member of the American Library Association's College Library Section in 1899 (precursor of the Association of College and Research Libraries) and a founding member of the Bibliographical Society of America.

He was president of the Ohio Library Association from 1900 to 1901 and again from 1914 to 1915. He was president of the American Library Association from 1921 to 1922. Root was the first secretary of the Hayes Historical Society from 1925 to 1927, and he collaborated with Webb C. Hayes in establishing the Rutherford B. Hayes Memorial Library.

Root taught at Western Reserve University from 1904 to 1927 and served as acting principal of the New York Public Library School from 1916 to 1917. He also oversaw the American Correspondence School of Librarianship from 1923 to 1927.

== Bibliography ==
- The Library School of the Future American Library Association, Volume 11 (July 1, 1917)
- Round Table of Training Class Teachers Bulletin of the American Library Association, Volume 12 (September 1, 1918)
- President's Address Bulletin of the American Library Association, Volume 16 (July 1, 1922)

== See also ==
- Oberlin College Library

Non-profit organization positions
Preceded by Alice S. Tyler	President of the American Library Association; 1921–1922	Succeeded by George Burwell Utley
