= Charles F. D. Belden =

American librarian

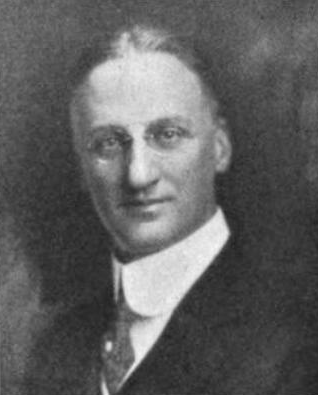

President of the American Library Association
- In office 1925–1926
- Preceded by: Herman H. B. Meyer
- Succeeded by: George H. Locke

Personal details
- Born: Charles Francis Dorr Belden; October 5, 1870 Syracuse, New York, US
- Died: October 24, 1931 (aged 61) Pittsfield, Massachusetts, US
- Spouse: Anna Marion Blackwell (m. 1908)
- Education: Harvard University
- Occupation: Librarian

Charles Francis Dorr Belden (October 5, 1870 – October 24, 1931) was an American librarian. He was a chairman of the Free Public Library Commission of Massachusetts and a former State Librarian of Massachusetts.

== Biography ==
Charles F. D. Belden was born in Syracuse, New York. He moved to Cambridge, Massachusetts in 1891 to pursue his education.

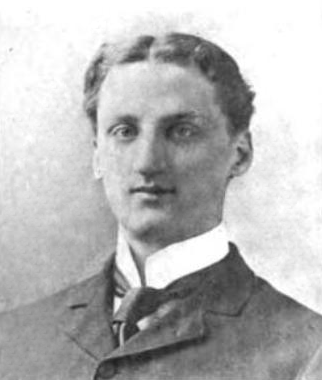
As a Harvard undergraduate, c. 1895

He graduated from Harvard University in 1895 and from Harvard Law School in 1898. He was secretary to the faculty of the Harvard Law School until appointed assistant librarian of the Harvard Law School in 1902. In September 1908, he resigned from the law school to become the librarian for the Social Law Library in Boston. In June, 1909, he was appointed State Librarian of Massachusetts and a member of the Free Public Library Commission. Belden was elected Librarian of the Boston Public Library on January 26, 1917.

Belden served as president of the American Library Association from 1925 to 1926. He was also active during World War I with the Library War Service (1917–19). Belden was a fellow of the American Library Institute, vice-president of the League of Library Commissions, and served as president of the National Association of State Libraries. He married Anna Marion Blackwell on May 26, 1908, and they had two daughters (Elizabeth Blackwell and Alison Blackwell) and two sons, Lawrence Putnam and Charles Hastings.

Charles F. D. Belden died at the House of Mercy hospital in Pittsfield, Massachusetts on October 24, 1931.

Non-profit organization positions
Preceded by Herman H. B. Meyer	President of the American Library Association; 1925–1926	Succeeded by George H. Locke
