= Chalmers Hadley =

American librarian and educator

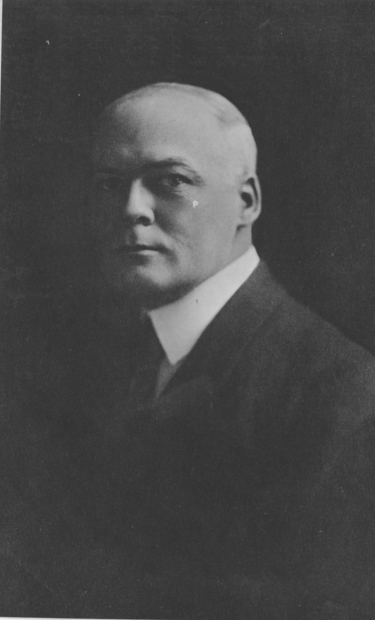

President of the American Library Association
- In office 1919–1920
- Preceded by: William Warner Bishop
- Succeeded by: Alice S. Tyler

Personal details
- Born: September 3, 1872 Indianapolis, Indiana, USA
- Died: May 11, 1958 (aged 85) Wyoming, Ohio
- Occupation: Librarian

Chalmers Hadley (September 3, 1872 – May 11, 1958) was an American librarian and educator. Hadley served as librarian of Denver Public Library from 1911 to 1924 and the Public Library of Cincinnati and Hamilton County from 1924 to 1945.

He was president of the American Library Association from 1919 to 1920.

== Bibliography ==
- The Library War Service and some things it has taught Bulletin of the American Library Association, Volume 13 (July 1, 1919)
- What Library Schools can do for the profession Bulletin of the American Library Association, volume 6 (July 1, 1912)
- Material for a Public Library Campaign (American Library Association, 1907)

Non-profit organization positions
Preceded by William Warner Bishop	President of the American Library Association; 1919–1920	Succeeded by Alice S. Tyler
