= James Bertram (Carnegie secretary) =

Personal secretary of Andrew Carnegie

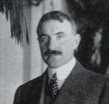
- Born: 17 March 1872; Corstorphine
- Died: 23 October 1934 (aged 62); New York City
- Occupation: Secretary
- Employer: Carnegie Corporation of New York

James Bertram (1872–1934) was the personal secretary of Andrew Carnegie, the industrialist and philanthropist, from 1897 to 1914. Bertram also served the Carnegie Corporation of New York from its inception in 1911 as secretary and trustee until his death in 1934. He thus continued to have an important role in Carnegie's philanthropic projects after Carnegie's death in 1919.

== Early life ==
Bertram was born in Corstorphine, near Edinburgh, the Scottish capital where he was educated at Daniel Stewart's College. His first position was with the Great Northern and Northeastern Railway company in Edinburgh. He emigrated to South Africa, where he continued to work in the railway industry. He returned to Scotland for health reasons in 1897, and was recruited by Andrew Carnegie, who had recently acquired a Scottish home, Skibo Castle.

== Activities in the United States ==
=== Libraries ===
By 1908, Bertram supervised Carnegie's library program in the United States. Carnegie became less directly involved with the project in his old age. Booker T. Washington's published correspondence gives details of how Bertram acted as an intermediary between Carnegie and the recipients of his largesse. Washington obtained Carnegie funding for the construction of a college library at what was then known as the Tuskegee Institute, and advised other institutions on how to obtain Carnegie funding. Washington found that it was worth cultivating Bertram, and when the latter asked for a domestic servant from Tuskegee he was not sent the standard letter denying that the institution trained domestic servants.

Bertram took a close interest in the design of new Carnegie libraries, commenting on the architectural plans submitted by applicants. His interventions discouraged extravagant architectural features, although he continued with "trademark" elements such as steps to the main entrance symbolising the reader's spiritual elevation as she entered the library. Bertram encouraged adherence to published guidelines, authoring Notes on Library Bildings (the non-standard spelling is explained by the fact that Carnegie favoured spelling reform). This 1910 work included complete plans.

Carnegie Library, Coshocton, Ohio Completed in 1904, the library cost $17,000 and has a portico

==== Libraries, the example of Iowa ====
Carnegie began funding libraries in Iowa before the arrival of Bertram in the USA. In 1892, Fairfield, Iowa, received a grant from Andrew Carnegie for $30,000 to build a public library. Apparently, this was at the request of an Iowa senator: until that point, Carnegie had only funded libraries at places to which he was personally connected (Scotland and Pennsylvania). At the turn of the century his giving increased dramatically. By 1903, 44 Carnegie libraries had been built for Iowa communities alone (Carnegie also funded academic libraries in the state, including a second library at Fairfield).

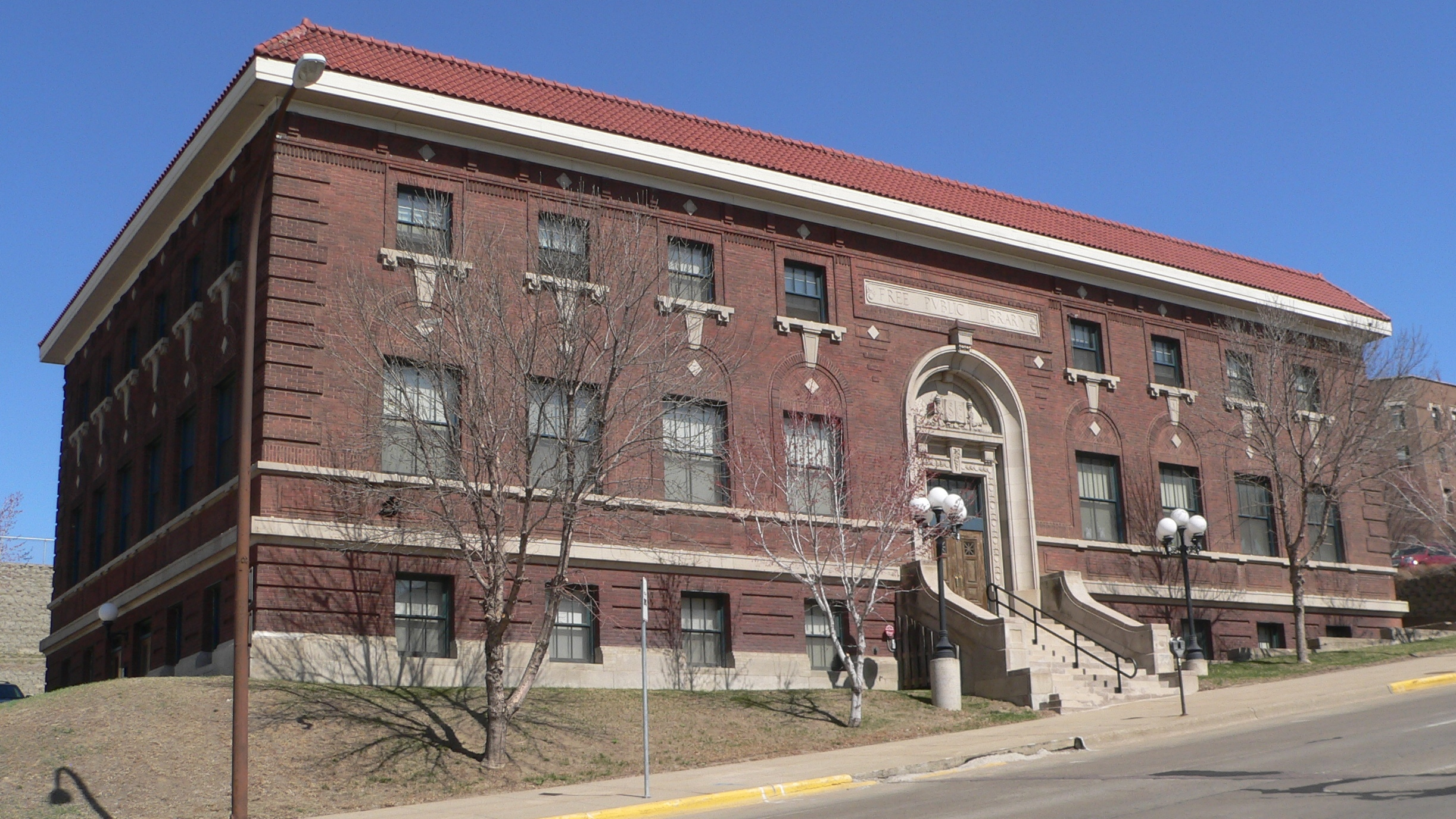
Sioux City Carnegie Library. Opened in 1913, the library cost $75,000. It was designed by library specialist Edward Lippincott Tilton

As well as being empowered by Andrew Carnegie to carry on negotiations, answer questions, and oversee contractual arrangements, Bertram also came to establish the eligibility requirements for communities to receive funding. The host community was required to have a population sufficiently large to support the library (although in the case of Alden Public Library, which served a large rural area, a population well below 1000 was deemed sufficient).

In the opinion of the Carnegie Libraries in Iowa Project, Bertram was not a good communicator, but he took his responsibilities very seriously. Bertram determined, as time went on, that beautiful architectural enhancements that adorned the library buildings (domes, marble staircases, statues) had to be eliminated in order to cut down on costs and to improve library functionality and working space for library services. He would provide inquiring groups with pamphlets on the need for practicality of design so that the grant amount would cover the construction costs to make it ready for immediate occupancy. Bertram's rigorous guardianship of the Carnegie Trust had the immediate effect he desired; however, it also caused substantial difficulties for some Iowa communities seeking to build libraries with Carnegie funding. Alice S. Tyler, secretary of the Iowa Library Commission from its inception in 1900 until 1913, objected to Bertram's stipulations, and would have preferred Iowans to pursue other sources of financial support, rejecting Carnegie funds. However, there appears to have been enthusiasm about Carnegie libraries at a local level. Of about 100 Iowa communities which applied for Carnegie funds, only 5 chose not to accept.

=== Pipe Organs ===
Bertram also involved himself with grants for pipe organs, and other projects.
