= Brooke E. Sheldon =

Librarian and educator

President of the American Library Association
- In office 1983–1984
- Preceded by: Carol A. Nemeyer
- Succeeded by: E. J. Josey

Personal details
- Born: August 29, 1931 Lawrence, Massachusetts, US
- Died: February 11, 2013 (aged 81) Santa Fe, New Mexico, US
- Education: Acadia University; Simmons College; University of Pittsburgh
- Occupation: Librarian

Brooke E. Sheldon was an American librarian and educator who served as the president of the American Library Association from 1983 to 1984.

== Career ==
Born in Lawrence, Massachusetts, Sheldon also grew up in Nova Scotia. She graduated from Cambridge High and Latin School in Cambridge, Massachusetts before returning to Nova Scotia to attend Acadia University as an undergraduate. She earned her master's degree in library science from Simmons College and a doctorate from the University of Pittsburgh.

She was a young adult librarian at the Detroit Public Library. She then worked as head of a branch at the Albuquerque Public Library, and head of the Children's Department at the Santa Fe Public Library.

She was director of Library Development at the New Mexico and at the Alaska state libraries.

Sheldon also worked at several library schools as a faculty member. She worked first as the dean and acting provost of the library school of Texas Woman's University. She later served as dean of the University of Texas at Austin School of Information and as interim director and professor of the University of Arizona School of Information Resources and Library Science. She also taught at the library schools of San Jose State University and the University of Alberta after her formal retirement.

From 1983 to 1984, Sheldon served as the president of the American Library Association, the oldest and largest library association in the world. She was Chair of the Association's Committee on Accreditation and served on Council and Executive Board.

On February 11, 2013, Sheldon died from uterine cancer.

== Awards ==
Awards earned by Sheldon include:

- Distinguished Alumni Award, Simmons College
- Distinguished Alumni Award, University of Pittsburgh
- Honorary doctorate, Acadia University
- Library Leadership Award, Arizona Library Association
- Outstanding Lecturer Award, San Jose State University
- Professional Service Award, Association of Library and Information Science Educators

At the University of Texas, she was honored with the establishment of an endowed professorship in her name. Additionally, the New Mexico Library Foundation created a professional development grant named for Sheldon.

== Selected Publications ==
- Sheldon, Brooke E. (2010). Interpersonal Skills, Theory and Practice: The Librarian's Guide to Becoming a Leader. Santa Barbara, Calif.: Libraries Unlimited.
- Haycock, Ken; Sheldon, Brooke E. (2008). The Portable MLIS: Insights from the Experts. Westport, Conn.: Libraries Unlimited.
- Woolls, Blanche; Sheldon, Brooke E. (2001). Delivering Lifelong Continuing Professional Education across Space and Time the Fourth World Conference on Continuing Professional Education for the Library and Information Science Professions. Berlin, Boston: DE GRUYTER SAUR. doi:10.1515/9783110948585.
- Roy, Loriene; Sheldon, Brooke E. (1998). Library and Information Studies Education in the United States. London: Mansell.
- Sheldon, Brooke E. (1991). Leaders in Libraries: Styles and Strategies for Success. Chicago: American Library Association.
- Sheldon, Brooke E. (1980). Personnel Administration in the Small Public Library. Chicago: Library Administration and Management Association, American Library Association.
- Sheldon, Brooke E. (1973). Planning and Evaluating Library Training Programs: A Guide for Library Leaders, Staffs and Advisory Groups. Washington: Continuing Library Education Network and Exchange.

Non-profit organization positions
Preceded by Carol A. Nemeyer	President of the American Library Association; 1983–1984	Succeeded by E. J. Josey
