= Keith Michael Fiels =

American librarian

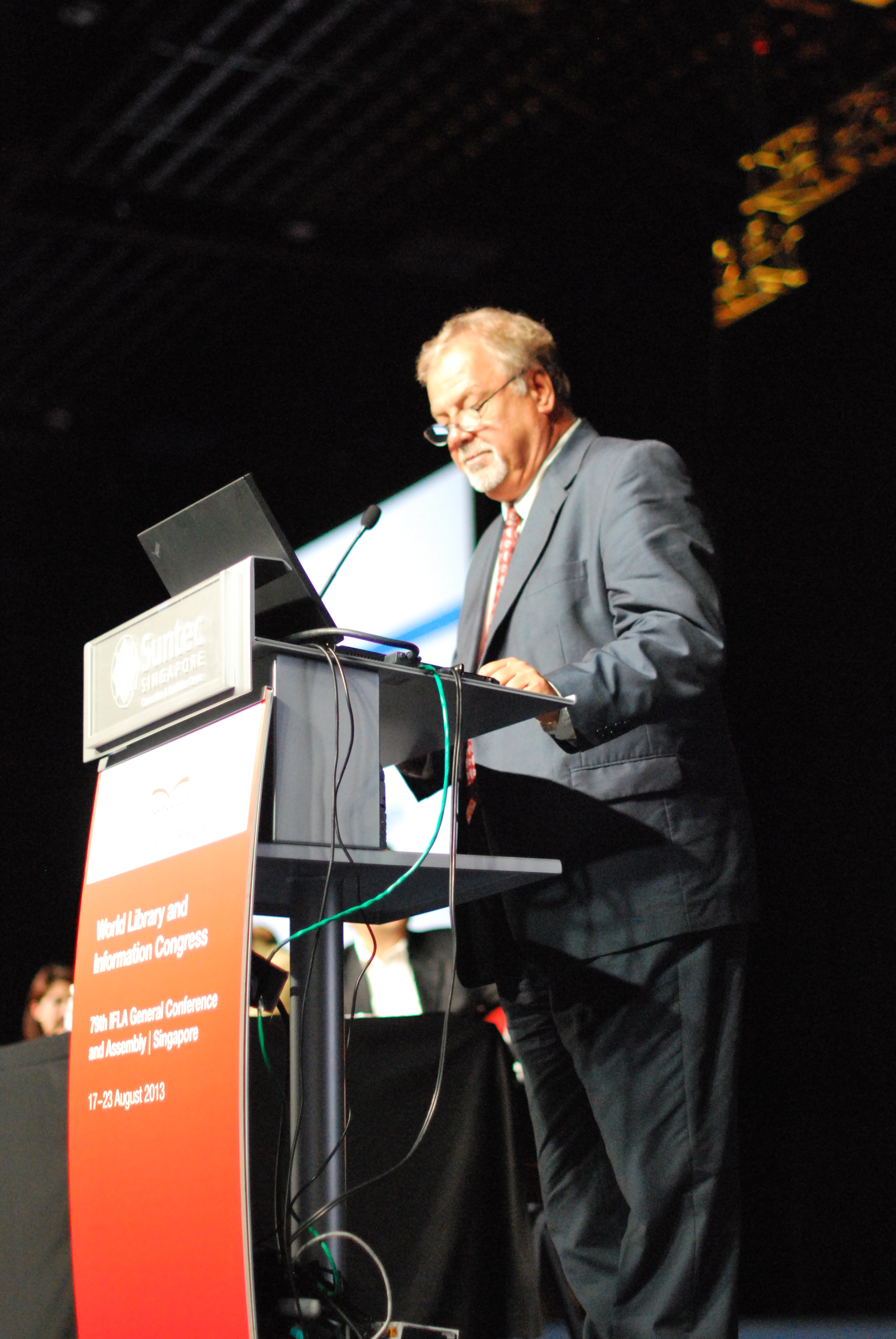
Fiels in 2013

Keith Michael Fiels (born 1949) is an American librarian. He was appointed Executive Director of the American Library Association in July 2002. In September 2016, he announced his retirement from the position. He retired on July 31, 2017. Fiels served as Executive Director longer than anyone else holding that title. Melvil Dewey (1879-1890, 1897-1898) and Carl Milam (1920-1948) served longer as the "Secretary" of the Association. David Clift served as Secretary from 1951-1958, and was the first Executive Director (1958-1972)

== Career ==
Keith Fiels earned a B.A. and an MLS from the State University of New York, Buffalo and did advanced studies at the University of Denver. When hired as the Executive Director of ALA, he was serving as Director of the Massachusetts Board of Library Commissioners. His senior level administrative experience in state libraries also included service as director of a library network, and as a staff consultant for the New York and New Jersey State Libraries. He is a former president of the Chief Officers of State Library Agencies (COSLA).

Keith Fiels has also worked as a public and school librarian and as an independent library consultant. He has been active in ALA committees and Divisions, as well as a succession of state library associations. He is the recipient of the Association of Specialized and Cooperative Library Agencies (ASCLA) Leadership Achievement Award and a Library Public Relations Council Award. He was named to the ALA Association for Library Trustees and Advocates (ALTA) National Advocacy Honor Roll in 2002 and the Massachusetts Library Association Hall of Fame in 2004. He has been a member of the American Library Association since 1976.

Under Fiels’s leadership, the American Library Association launched several initiatives, including the Office for Library Advocacy and the Center for the Future of Libraries; expanded its publishing division; increased community engagement; and expanded its professional development programs.

== Publications ==
- Multitype library cooperation: an annotated guide to working documents, compiled and edited by Keith Michael Fiels and Margie Epple, Association of Specialized and Cooperative Library Agencies, 1988.
- Planning for automation: a how-to-do it manual for librarians, John M. Cohn, Ann L. Kelsey, Keith Michael Fiels. Cohn, John M. Neal Schuman Publishers, c1992.
- Planning for automation, John M. Cohn, Ann L. Kelsey and Keith Michael Fiels. Cohn, John M., Neal-Schuman, c1997.
- Planning for Library Automation: A Practical Handbook, John M. Cohn, Ann L. Kelsey, Keith Michael Fiels, Graeme Muirhead, Facet Publishing, 1998.
- Writing and updating technology plans: a guidebook with sample policies on CD-ROM, John M. Cohn, Ann L. Kelsey, and Keith Michael Fiels. Cohn, John M., Neal-Schuman Publishers, c1999.
- Planning for integrated systems and technologies: a how-to-do-it manual for librarians, John M. Cohn, Ann L. Kelsey, and Keith Michael Fiels. Cohn, John M. Neal-Schuman Publishers, c2001.
- "Why We Need Free Public Libraries More Than Ever," The Atlantic, July 27, 2011.
- Columns from American Libraries (the official journal of the American Library Association) are archived here.
- 101 Boardroom Problems and How to Solve Them, by Eli Mina, Foreword by Keith Michael Fiels. AMACOM, 2008
- Circulating Ideas [podcast]: Episode 100, August 20, 2016
