= National Library Symbol =

The National Library Symbol

The National Library Symbol is a pictogram indicating the location of a library. It features a white silhouette of a book and a reader on a blue background (originally specified Pantone PMS #285). It was adopted by the American Library Association in 1982 to raise awareness of services provided by libraries and to convey a more "modern" image.

== History ==
The 1979 White House Conference on Library and Information Services recommended the adoption of a national library symbol to increase public awareness of libraries. In 1981, American Library Association President Elizabeth W. Stone established a task force, headed by Dorothy Pollet Gray of the Library Congress, to select a symbol. After examining international examples of library symbols, the task force selected a symbol designed by Ralph E. DeVore for the Western Maryland Public Libraries in 1978. It first appeared officially in the 1982 American Library Association publication A Sign System for Libraries, which was the result of a project by Mary S. Mallery and Ralph E. DeVore to develop a standardized system of signs, color codes, and terminology for the Western Maryland Public Libraries.

At the 1982 American Library Association Annual Conference in Philadelphia, the symbol was officially endorsed for nationwide use. As criteria in its decision, the task force noted its clean and simple design, evoking that of existing international symbols, and its potential to accommodate future adaptations and modifications. The symbol was widely promoted during National Library Week, held April 17–23, 1983.

In March 1985, the Federal Highway Administration adopted the symbol for use in the 4th edition of the Manual on Uniform Traffic Control Devices (sign designation I4-1 in the 11th edition).

== Adaptations ==
In 2009, the American Library Association released an updated version of the National Library Symbol to accompany their "Libraries Connect Communities 3: Public Library Funding & Technology Access Study." The symbol was designed by Illinois graphic designed Brian Benson. It was not intended as an official replacement of the original symbol.

In 2017, Rebecca McCorkindale released a series of images based on the National Library Symbol with the phrase "Libraries Are For Everyone". She created them in collaboration with Julie Syler and Ashley Jones from the Saline County Library in Benton, Arkansas, and released them in the public domain. She has released versions in over 100 languages. LAFE signs have been adopted as interior decorations in many libraries throughout the United States.
