= Freedom to Read Foundation =

American nonprofit anti-censorship organization

The Freedom to Read Foundation (FTRF) is an American non-profit anti-censorship organization, established in 1969 by the American Library Association. The organization has been active in First Amendment-based challenges to book removals from libraries, and in anti-surveillance work. In addition to its legal work, the FTRF engages in advocacy and public awareness, such as its sponsorship of the annual celebration of "Banned Books Week".

== History ==
The FTRF was established in 1969 by members of the American Library Association, including Judith Krug, Alexander Allain, and Carrie C Robinson. The organization was founded as "the American Library Association's response to its members' interest in having adequate means to support and defend librarians whose positions are jeopardized because of their resistance to abridgments of the First Amendment; and to set legal precedent for the freedom to read on behalf of all people".

The FTRF was set up in conjunction with the ALA's Office for Intellectual Freedom instead of as a separate entity because of the work ALA was already doing to protect the First Amendment and intellectual freedom. When the Foundation was being planned for and organized, Allain expressed concern in a letter to the Director of the Intellectual Freedom Office, Judith Krug, that ALA members would forget what the ALA has done and continues to do for intellectual freedom by covering themselves in this new umbrella of aid and assistance in the FTRF. Allain felt that there should be overlap of both organizations so that the focus remained centered on intellectual freedom and could be worked on in harmony.

Allain also felt that in forming the FTRF with the ALA, the Foundation would be able to benefit from some of the clout and connections that ALA already had. He also suggested keeping policies between the two organizations similar because of his belief in the good work that the ALA does; he was continuously concerned about the ALA in his creation of the foundation and did not want members to see the foundation as a replacement but rather an addition to.

The organization's charter describes four purposes for the Foundation, including:

Promoting and protecting the freedom of speech and of the press;

Protecting the public's right of access to information and materials stored in the nation's libraries;

Safeguarding libraries' right to disseminate all materials contained in their collections; and

Supporting libraries and librarians in their defense of First Amendment rights by supplying them with legal counsel or the means to secure it.

The organization works through litigation, consumer education, and awarding grants to other individuals and entities working on similar projects.

== See also ==
- Book censorship in the United States
- List of most commonly challenged books in the United States
- Uprise Books Project
