= Carol A. Nemeyer =

American librarian

President of the American Library Association
- In office 1982–1983
- Preceded by: Elizabeth W. Stone
- Succeeded by: Brooke E. Sheldon

Personal details
- Born: January 29, 1929
- Died: June 30, 2008 (aged 79) Fort Lauderdale, Florida, US
- Education: Berea College
- Occupation: Librarian

Carol Anmuth Nemeyer (January 29, 1929 – June 30, 2008) was an American librarian and a president of the American Library Association from 1982 to 1983. she married Lieutenant Commander Sheldon Nemeyer on September 23, 1950.

As ALA president, Nemeyer set up a commission to "call national attention to problems threatening broad and equal opportunities for public access to information, including obvious questions of library support." The Commission on Freedom and Equality of Access to Information was chaired by Dan Lacy of McGraw-Hill.

Nemeyer graduated from Berea College and the Columbia University School of Library Service. She worked as the librarian at the McGraw-Hill Publishing Company before she joined the staff of the Association of American Publishers in the early 1970s. In 1977, she joined the Library of Congress as the associate librarian for national programs.

Carol and her husband Sheldon Nemeyer retired in 1986 and lived on a boat, sailing the Caribbean from Fort Lauderdale, Florida.

Non-profit organization positions
| Preceded by Elizabeth W. Stone | President of the American Library Association; 1982–1983 | Succeeded by Brooke E. Sheldon |
