= Alexander Allain =

American lawyer

Allain in 1969

Alexander Peter Allain (June 27, 1920 – January 5, 1994) was an American lawyer and library advocate known for his work securing the freedom of expression. His career was devoted to securing First Amendment rights for libraries.

Allain is recognized as one of American Libraries' "100 of the Most Important Leaders we had in the 20th Century" for being "a true visionary" in his battle to uphold the First Amendment; his work with the American Library Association (ALA) included helping with the creation of the Office for Intellectual Freedom in 1967 and cofounding the Freedom to Read Foundation.

== Early life ==
Born in Louisiana, Allain received his law degree from Loyola University New Orleans in 1942. As a young man, he served as a liaison officer in the French Navy during World War II, stationed in Casablanca. In 1953, Allain was appointed to the St. Mary Parish Library Board of Control in Louisiana. It was during this time that the United States feared communism and scrutinized libraries for harboring any information that could potentially influence the public opinion. This was an influential time in Allain's life as he went on to make intellectual freedom cases his life's work.

== The Louisiana Library Association ==
Allain was very involved in the Louisiana Library Association (LLA) as well as the American Library Association.. In 1964, he was the first chair of the Louisiana Library Association Intellectual Freedom Committee, and he continued to stay active in the state association throughout his life. He was instrumental in the formation of the Council of Louisiana Trustees (COLT), which worked to organize library trustee activity in Louisiana. He also served in numerous other capacities such as chair and vice-chair of the LLA Trustees Section.

In 1970 Allain testified at Congressional Hearings on behalf of libraries for an extension of the Library Services and Construction Act.

The Louisiana Library Association annually recognizes librarians who promote intellectual freedom in Louisiana with the Alex Allain Intellectual Freedom Award.

== The Freedom to Read Foundation and the American Library Association ==
One of Allain's biggest contributions to fight for intellectual freedom within libraries was the work he did with American Library Association's Office for Intellectual Freedom to co-found the Freedom to Read Foundation (FTRF) in 1969.

The Freedom to Read Foundation was set up in conjunction with the ALA's Office for Intellectual Freedom instead of as a separate entity because of the work ALA was already doing to protect the First Amendment and intellectual freedom. When the Foundation was being planned for and organized, Allain expressed concern in a letter to the Director of the Intellectual Freedom Office, Judith Krug, that ALA members would forget what the ALA has done and continues to do for intellectual freedom by covering themselves in this new umbrella of aid and assistance in the Freedom to Read Foundation . Allain felt that there should be overlap of both organizations so that the focus remained centered on intellectual freedom and could be worked on in harmony.

Allain also felt that in forming the Freedom to Read Foundation with the ALA, the Foundation would be able to benefit from some of the clout and connections that ALA already had. He also suggested keeping policies between the two organizations similar because of his belief in the good work that the ALA does; he was continuously concerned about the ALA in his creation of the foundation and did not want members to see the foundation as a replacement but rather an addition to.

== Other works, achievements and awards ==
Library trustees, along with intellectual freedom, were another area of Allain's interest and expertise. Some of his publications in this area include, "Trustees & Censorship," in The Library Trustee: a Practical Guidebook, 1964; "Public Library Governing Bodies & Intellectual Freedom", Library Trends, July 1970; and "The First & Fourteenth Amendment as They Support Libraries, Librarians, Library Systems & Library Development," Illinois Libraries, January 1974.

According to an article in memory of Allain in the Louisiana Library Association (LLA) journal, Louisiana Libraries, he won many awards including:

- Louisiana Library Association, Modisette Award for Trustees (1965),
- ALA's Trustee Award (1969),
- University of Illinois Urbana-Champaign, School of Information Sciences Robert B. Downs Intellectual Freedom Award (1973),
- American Library Association Honorary Membership (1975),
- John Phillip Immroth Memorial Award (1979),
- Freedom to Read Foundation Roll of Honor Award (1989 and 1999),
- Southeastern Library Association President's Award (1990)
- Louisiana Library Association Intellectual Freedom Award (1991).

The Franklin branch of the St. Mary Parish Library in Louisiana is named in Allain's memory.

Outside of his professional life, Allain was an avid volunteer in the community. He was a member of Rotary International, Knights of Columbus, Scouting and president of the Jeanerette, Louisiana Chamber of Commerce.
