= Marianna Tax Choldin =

Marianna Tax Choldin (1942–2023) retired as Mortenson Distinguished Professor Emerita, University of Illinois at Urbana-Champaign.

She was on the faculty during 1969–2002. Her research interests included censorship in Russia, the Soviet Union, and the post-Communist states.

She received the bachelor's (1962) and Ph.D. (1979) from the University of Chicago.

She was the founding director of the Mortenson Center for International Library Programs from 1991 until her retirement in 2002.

In 1995 she served as President of the American Association for the Advancement of Slavic Studies. From 1997 to 2000 she chaired the library program of the Soros Foundation.

Her interests in the study of censorship originated in an incident with the customs officer who confiscated books and magazines from passengers entering the Soviet Union.

== Books ==
- 2016: Garden of Broken Statues: Exploring Censorship in Russia, ISBN 1618115448
- Choldin, Marianna Tax, Maurice Friedberg, and Barbara L. Dash. 1989. The Red Pencil: Artists, Scholars, and Censors in the USSR. Boston: Unwin Hyman.
- 1985: A Fence Around the Empire: Russian Censorship of Western Ideas Under the Tsars

== Awards ==
- 2011: public service award from the University of Chicago
- 2011: Robert B. Downs Intellectual Freedom Award from the Graduate School of Library and Information Science at the University of Illinois at Urbana-Champaign
- 2011: Alumni Medal form the UChicago Alumni Association
- 2005: John Ames Humphry/OCLC/Forest Press Award from the American Library Association's International Relations Committee, for significant contributions to international librarianship
- 2001: She was the first recipient of the University of Illinois' Distinguished Faculty Award for International Achievement
- 2000: Gold Medal of Pushkin, Russia, for "extraordinary contributions in the sphere of Russian culture and education"

== Personal ==
Her grandmother was Jewish coming from Ukraine, Russian Empire. Her father was professor of anthropology at the University of Chicago.
