= Thomas J. Galvin =

American librarian and academic

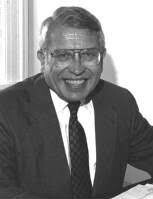
- Dr. Galvin at the University at Albany
- Born: Thomas John Galvin, Jr. December 30, 1932; Arlington, Massachusetts
- Died: February 18, 2004 (aged 71); Chicago, Illinois
- Resting place: Milton, Massachusetts
- Education: Columbia University; Simmons College; Case Western Reserve University
- Occupations: Librarian and Academic
- Years active: 1962-1999
- Spouse: Marie C. Schumb (m. 1956)

President of the American Library Association
- In office 1979–1980
- Preceded by: Russell Shank
- Succeeded by: Peggy A. Sullivan

Thomas J. Galvin (December 30, 1932 – February 18, 2004) was an American librarian and academic. Galvin held a bachelor's degree in English from Columbia University and a master's in library science from Simmons College as well as a doctorate from Case Western Reserve University. From 1962 to 1972, he held a series of combined faculty and leadership positions at the graduate school of library and information science at Simmons College, ultimately being named associate dean and professor. He was then made dean of the school of library and information science at the University of Pittsburgh from 1974 to 1985.

Galvin served as president of the American Library Association from 1979 to 1980 and as its executive director from 1985 to 1989.

Galvin returned to academia as a professor in the School of Information Science and Policy at the University at Albany in 1989, where he implemented an interdisciplincary doctoral program in information science. He retired in 1999 and was made professor emeritus by the faculty.

== Awards and honors ==
- ALISE Award for Professional Contributions to Library and Information Sciences Education (1993)
- Medical Library Association’s Eliot Prize for the most significant contribution to the literature of medical librarianship (1988)
- Best information science book of the year by the American Society for Information Science (1979) for The Structure and Governance of Library Networks with Allen Kent.

Non-profit organization positions
Preceded by Russell Shank	President of the American Library Association; 1979–1980	Succeeded by Peggy A. Sullivan
