= ALA Code of Ethics =

The Library Code of Ethics was created by the American Library Association (ALA). The document is a guideline for librarians and other library associates on how to uphold the values that libraries symbolize. It currently includes nine core principles that "are expressed in broad statements to guide ethical decision making".

The Code was created in 1939 and since has been updated four times. The Code of Ethics was first amended in 1981 and then again in 1995 and 2008. The most current version was accepted by the ALA on June 29, 2021. A common thread within the various Code of Ethics focuses on the significance of intellectual freedom and the dangers of censorship. The changes between the different versions of the Code include the language used and input. In the 1939 and 1981 Code of Ethics some the language included statements such as "librarians must" and "librarians will". The 1995, 2008, and 2021 versions of the Code have different rhetoric. Older versions of the Code use words such as "we as librarians" because many librarians were able to input their concerns and ideas and this language implies a statement of fact. The most recent amendment was codified in 2021, the Social and Racial Justice subgroup of the Committee on Professional Ethics (COPE) in collaboration with groups within the ALA, including the Office for Diversity, Literacy, and Outreach Advisory Committee, the Committee on Diversity, and the Intellectual Freedom Committee, added a ninth principle addressing ethics regarding racial and social justice, diversity, equity, and inclusion.
