= Peggy Sullivan =

American librarian and educator (1929–2020)

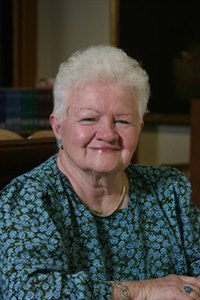

President of the American Library Association
- In office 1980–1981
- Preceded by: Thomas J. Galvin
- Succeeded by: Elizabeth W. Stone

Personal details
- Born: August 12, 1929
- Died: April 13, 2020 (aged 90)
- Education: University of Chicago
- Occupation: Librarian

Peggy Sullivan (August 12, 1929 – April 13, 2020) was an American librarian and educator. She was elected president of the American Library Association and was a scholar of the history of librarianship.

== Biography ==
Sullivan during her work on the ALA Centennial Committee

Throughout her career, Sullivan served as:

- Dean, Graduate School of Library and Information Science, Dominican University (formerly Rosary College), River Forest, Illinois (1995–1997)
- Executive director, American Library Association, Chicago, Illinois (1992–1994)
- Director and professor, University Libraries, Northern Illinois University, De Kalb, Illinois (1990–1992)
- Dean and professor, College of Professional Studies, Northern Illinois University, De Kalb, Illinois (1981–1992)
- Assistant commissioner, Chicago Public Library, Chicago, Illinois (1977–1981).
- Dean of students, University of Chicago Graduate Library School, 1974–1977.

From 1952 to 1977, Sullivan held positions of increasing responsibility in public and school libraries. She directed the national Knapp School Libraries Project for the American Association of School Librarians (1963–1968) which had received $1,130,000 to raise the standards of school libraries.

Sullivan served on the faculties of the University of Pittsburgh and the University of Chicago Graduate Library School. She also taught on part-time, summer or interim bases at six other library education programs (the University of Maryland, Rutgers University-New Brunswick, Syracuse University, the Catholic University of America, Drexel University, and Rosary College) and directed the American Library Association's Office for Library Personnel Resources.

Highlights of Sullivan's career include President of ALA's Children's Services Division (now the Association for Library Service to Children – ALSC) (1976–1977), Chair Centennial Celebration of the American Library Association (1976), assistant commissioner for extension services at the Chicago Public Library (1977–1981), ALA president (1980–1981), ALA executive director (1992–1994), Dean of the LIS Program at Rosary College (now Dominican University), Dean of the College of Professional Studies at Northern Illinois University, and numerous university teaching positions. Sullivan served as director of the Knapp School Libraries Project (1963–1968). This project had great national impact on convincing the public of the need for high quality school library media programs.

Sullivan was the 1991 recipient of ALA's Joseph W. Lippincott Award, and was an alumnus of the University of Chicago, Catholic University and Clarke University.

In 2004, Sullivan established the Sullivan Award for Public Library Administrators. This award is presented annually to an individual who has shown exceptional understanding and support of public library service to children while having general management/supervisory/administrative responsibility that has included public library service to children in its scope. She also presented the Sullivan Award to a faculty member in the NIU College of Health and Human Sciences (formerly the College of Professional Studies, where she was dean) for achievement in research. It is presented every fall on the NIU campus.

== Education ==
- Ph.D., University of Chicago Graduate Library School. 1972
- M.S. in L.S., Catholic University of America, Washington, DC, 1953; Thesis:(1953). Work of public libraries with trade unions in the United States.
- B.A., Clarke College, Dubuque, IA, 1950

== Selected publications ==
- Carl H. Milam and the American Library Association (H. W. Wilson, 1976) ISBN 0824205928
- Public Libraries: Smart Practices in Personnel, with William H. Ptacek (Libraries Unlimited, 1978) ISBN 0872872785
- Opportunities in Library and Information Science (Vocational Guidance Manuals, 1977) ISBN 089022224X (Sullivan had varying responsibilities for later editions of this title with various publishers)
- Problems in School Media Management (Bowker, 1972) ISBN 0835204278
- Many Names for Eileen (Follett, 1969) ISBN 0695455214
- Sullivan, Peggy, ed. (1968). Realization; the Final Report of the Knapp School Libraries Project. Chicago: American Library Association.
- The O'Donnells (Follett, 1956)
- More than 100 articles on various aspects of librarianship, education, administration, and history
- Reviews of books and other media, also numbering in excess of 100, for a variety of educational and library publications, as well as for The Baltimore Sun, The Washington Post, and The Chicago Tribune

== Recognitions and special assignments ==
- UNESCO Consultant on School Libraries, Australia, 1970
- President, American Library Association, 1980–1981. Theme: "Libraries and the Pursuit of Happiness."
- Numerous committee appointments and elective offices in the American Library Association, 1959 and continuing, including the presidency of the Children's Services Division, 1976–1977, and membership on the ALA Council
- Distinguished Service Award, Association for Library Service to Children, 2000
- Joseph W. Lippincott Award, American Library Association, 1991
- Distinguished Alumnus Award, School of Library and Information Science, Catholic University of America
- Distinguished Alumnus Award, Clarke College,
- Honors Award, High School Section, Catholic Library Association
- Inclusion in Marquis Who's Who in America and its various regional and special publications
- Consultancies relating to seminary libraries, fundraising, personnel management, faculty development, library education curriculum, library facilities planning, and general educational and library issues provided to a range of institutions and agencies, including the National Endowment for the Humanities, the New York Public Library, the Ford Foundation, the Lilly Foundation, and the US Department of Education
- Vice President and Program Chair, Caxton Club of Chicago, 2001–2002
- Treasurer, Chicago Literary Club, 2006–2007
- Consulting assignments and the presentation of speeches, workshops, storytelling programs, as well as participation in ALA accreditation of library education programs have taken Peggy Sullivan to every one of the fifty US states and every continent except Antarctica (which she visited on her own).
- Committee appointments in the Illinois Library Association, the Catholic Library Association, the Association of college and Research Libraries, the Library Administration Division of the American Library Association, and the American Association of School Librarians
- Donor, the Sullivan Award for Public Library Administrators, American Library Association, 2004 and continuing annually

== Awards and recognition ==
In 2008, Sullivan was awarded American Library Association Honorary Membership. She was nominated in recognition of over 50 years of dedicated librarianship during which she wrote the definitive scholarly history of the tenure of Carl Milam (ALA secretary 1920–1946) and the growth of the American Library Association to an international organization."

Sullivan was the only honorary member to have a giant image of her book on a parking garage in the Kansas City Library District. The facade includes her 1956 children's book, The O'Donnells, as a title on the Community Bookshelf.

Non-profit organization positions
Preceded by Thomas J. Galvin	President of the American Library Association; 1980–1981	Succeeded by Elizabeth W. Stone
