= Allen Kent =

American information scientist

- Born: October 24, 1921; New York City
- Died: May 1, 2014 (aged 92); Pittsburgh, Pennsylvania
- Occupation: Information scientist
- Years active: 1952–1992

Allen Kent (October 24, 1921 – May 1, 2014) was an American information scientist.

== Early life ==
He was born in New York City. At City College of New York, he earned a degree in chemistry. During World War II, he served in the United States Army Air Forces. After the war, he worked on a classified project at MIT in mechanized document encoding and search.

== Career ==
In 1955, he helped found the Center for Documentation Communication Research at Western Reserve University. This was "the first academic program in the field of mechanized information retrieval, first using cards, then utilizing new reel-to-reel tape technology." In the same year, he introduced the measures of precision and recall in Perry, Kent & Berry (1955). In 1959, he wrote an article for Harper's magazine entitled, "A Machine That Does Research" which provided one of the first insights in mainstream media about how Americans' lives can change due to electronic information technology. He joined the faculty of the University of Pittsburgh in 1963, where in 1970 he began the Department of Information Science. He retired from the university in 1992. At the time of his death, he was Distinguished Service Professor in the School of Information Sciences at the University of Pittsburgh The school named a scholarship after him.

== Selective bibliography ==
- Perry, James W.; Kent, Allen; Berry, Madeline M. (1955). "Machine literature searching X. Machine language; factors underlying its design and development". American Documentation. 6 (4): 242–254. doi:10.1002/asi.5090060411.
- "A Machine That Does Research," (April 1959), Harper's Magazine
- Information Analysis and Retrieval, 1962
- The Structure and Governance of Library Networks with Thomas J. Galvin. New York: Marcel Dekker, 1979.
- The Encyclopedia of Library and Information Science (1968-2003). Edited by Allen Kent, Harold Lancour and Jay E. Daily. New York: Marcel Dekker.
- The Encyclopedia of Computer Science and Technology
- The Encyclopedia of Microcomputers

== Awards ==
- 1980 Best Information Science Book for The Structure and Governance of Library Networks from ASIS
- 1977 Award of Merit from American Society for Information Science and Technology
- 1968 Eastman Kodak Award for significant contributions to the Science of Information Technology
