= Judith Krug =

American librarian and freedom of speech proponent (1940–2009)

Judith F. Krug
- Judith Krug
- Born: Judith Fingeret Krug; March 15, 1940; Pittsburgh, Pennsylvania, U.S.
- Died: April 11, 2009 (aged 69); Evanston, Illinois, U.S.
- Resting place: Shalom Memorial Park, Arlington Heights, Illinois, U.S. 42.131633°N 87.998346°W
- Other name: Judith Fingeret
- Education: University of Pittsburgh; University of Chicago
- Occupation: Librarian
- Years active: 1962–2009
- Employer: American Library Association
- Known for: Freedom of speech proponent; Critic of censorship; Director of American Library Association Office for Intellectual Freedom; Co-founder of Banned Books Week
- Spouse: Herbert Krug
- Children: 2
- Awards: Carl Sandburg Freedom to Read Award; Joseph W. Lippincott Award; William J. Brennan Award

Judith Fingeret Krug (March 15, 1940 – April 11, 2009) was an American librarian, freedom of speech proponent, and critic of censorship. Krug became director of the Office for Intellectual Freedom at the American Library Association in 1967. In 1969, she joined the Freedom to Read Foundation as its executive director. Krug co-founded Banned Books Week in 1982.

She coordinated the effort against the Communications Decency Act of 1996, which was the first attempt by the United States Congress to introduce a form of censorship of speech on the Internet. Krug strongly opposed the notion that libraries should censor the material that they provide to patrons. She supported laws and policies protecting the confidentiality of library use records. When the United States Department of Justice used the authority of the USA PATRIOT Act of 2001 to conduct searches of what once were confidential library databases, Krug raised a public outcry against this activity by the government.

In 2003, she was the leader of the initiative to challenge the constitutionality of the Children's Internet Protection Act. Her efforts led to a partial victory for anti-censorship campaigners; the Supreme Court of the United States ruled that the law was constitutional, but that filtering software on computers in public libraries could be turned off if so requested by an adult guardian. Krug warned that the filters used to censor Internet pornography from children were not perfect and risked blocking educational information about social matters, sexuality, and healthcare.

== Early life and education ==
Krug was born Judith Fingeret in Pittsburgh, Pennsylvania, on March 15, 1940. Her interest in freedom of speech was fostered from an early age. She recalled reading a book about sex education under the covers in her bedroom with a flashlight at the age of 12. Her mother found her and asked what she was doing. When she held up the book, her mother allowed her to continue reading and told her to turn on the bedroom light so she could read properly and avoid damage to her eyes.

Krug studied for a Bachelor of Arts degree at the University of Pittsburgh and graduated in 1962. She received a Master of Arts degree in library science from the Graduate Library School of the University of Chicago. Her Master's thesis compared indexing methodologies for accessing works of literature. She married Herbert Krug in 1964; they had two children and five grandchildren.

== Library career ==
=== Office for Intellectual Freedom director ===
Krug began her library career in 1962 when she began working as a reference librarian at the John Crerar Library in Chicago. In 1963, she became a cataloguer for the Northwestern University Dental School. She became a research analyst for the American Library Association in 1965, and in 1967 she became director of its Office for Intellectual Freedom (OIF) upon its foundation. Krug described the role of the OIF as protection of the right of individuals in the U.S. to have comprehensive availability of information, regardless of those who disapprove of the material itself.

As director of the OIF, Krug organized publication of a newsletter which recounted instances of censorship in the U.S. and suggested ways to deal with these attempts to limit free speech. She supervised publication of the Intellectual Freedom Manual, the Newsletter on Intellectual Freedom, and the events of Banned Books Week. Krug also helped lead the Intellectual Freedom Round Table, the Committee on Professional Ethics, the Freedom to Read Foundation, and the Intellectual Freedom Committee. In 1969, Krug became the first head of the Freedom to Read Foundation, a sister organization to the OIF.

The Freedom to Read Foundation was formed to uphold the First Amendment to the United States Constitution and assist with legal defense. In her capacity as director of the OIF, Krug worked to start Banned Books Week in 1982. She coordinated opposition to the Communications Decency Act of 1996, which was the first attempt by the United States Congress to introduce a form of censorship of speech on the Internet.

=== Opposition to library censorship ===
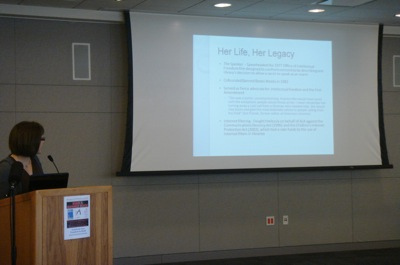
Judith Krug tribute at the ALA Student Chapter of the San Jose State University (2009)

Krug strongly opposed the notion that libraries ought to censor the material that they provide to patrons. She supported laws and policies protecting the confidentiality of library use records. When the United States Department of Justice used the authority of the USA PATRIOT Act of 2001 to conduct searches of once-confidential library databases, Krug raised a public outcry against this government action. When shortly after the September 11 attacks a Florida librarian told police that one of the attackers had been using the Delray Beach public library—although Florida law guarantees confidentiality to library patrons—Krug criticized the action. She stated she wished the librarian had adhered to Florida law, but empathized with the situation and said that most individuals would likely have done the same thing.

In 2003, Krug led the challenge to the constitutionality of the Children's Internet Protection Act. Her efforts led to a partial victory for the Act's opponents; the Supreme Court of the United States ruled that the law was constitutional, but that internet filtering software on computers in public libraries could be turned off if so requested by an adult guardian. She said that filters used to censor Internet pornography from children were not perfect and risked blocking educational information about social matters, sexuality, and healthcare. She emphasized the need to educate children about morality instead of using online filters to block information from them. In 2006, she was elected vice-president of Phi Beta Kappa society.

Krug served as chair of the board of directors of the Center for Democracy and Technology, chair of the Media Coalition, vice-chair of the Internet Education Foundation and was a member of the advisory board of GetNetWise. She sat on the 2006 panel of judges for the PEN/Newman's Own First Amendment Award, which recognizes those who defend the right to freedom of expression in writing enshrined in the First Amendment. Krug also served on the Boards of Directors of the Fund for Free Expression, the Illinois Division of the American Civil Liberties Union, the American Bar Association's Commission on Public Understanding About the Law, and the Advisory Council of the Illinois State Justice Commission.

== Death and memorial ==
After being afflicted with stomach cancer for over a year, Krug died of her illness aged 69 on April 11, 2009, at Evanston Hospital in Evanston, Illinois. The Judith F. Krug Memorial Fund was founded by the American Library Association to ensure that Banned Books Week would remain active after her death. The eighth edition of the Intellectual Freedom Manual published in 2010 by the Office for Intellectual Freedom of the American Library Association was dedicated to Krug's memory.

== Bibliography ==
- Krug, Judith F. (1964). A comparison of the uniterm, descriptor, and role-indicator methods of encoding literature for information retrieval (Thesis). Chicago, Illinois: University of Chicago. OCLC 33214992.
- Krug, Judith F. (January 1966). "ALA Library Research Clearinghouse". ALA Bulletin. 60 (1). Database: Arts & Sciences VI: 72. ISSN 0364-4006. OCLC 4896237150.
- Krug, Judith F. (December 1967). "Writing Research Proposals". ALA Bulletin. 61 (11). American Library Association; Database: Arts & Sciences VI: 1314–1318. ISSN 0364-4006. OCLC 4896242960.
- Krug, Judith F. (1967). Pilot project to develop requirements for establishing an information system for research activities in the field of librarianship and information science. Chicago, Illinois: American Library Association. OCLC 229105196.
- Krug, Judith F.; Stuart M Kaminsky (1969). Memorandum to state intellectual freedom committee chairmen : the Evergreen review controversy at the Los Angeles Public Library. Chicago, Illinois: American Library Association; Office for Intellectual Freedom. OCLC 82265476.
- Krug, Judith F.; Edwin Castagna (1970). The challenges of intellectual freedom and censorship. Carson City, Nevada: Nevada Library Association. OCLC 58876562.
- Krug, Judith F. (November 1972). "Intellectual Freedom — The Struggle Continues". NJEA Review. 46 (3). Database: ERIC; United States Department of Education: 16–17. OCLC 425700201.
- Krug, Judith F. (September 1972). "Growing Pains: Intellectual Freedom and the Child". The English Journal. 61 (6). Database: Arts & Sciences IV: 805–813. doi:10.2307/813982. ISSN 0013-8274. JSTOR 813982. OCLC 4894501430.
- Krug, Judith F. (1973). "Intellectual Freedom and the Rights of Children". School Media Quarterly. 1 (2). Database: ERIC; United States Department of Education: 132–135. OCLC 425680497.
- Krug, Judith F. (1974). The Curse of Interesting Times. Chicago, Illinois: American Library Association; Database: ERIC; United States Department of Education. OCLC 424733428.
- Krug, Judith F. (1979). "Chelsea Case Decided: Judge Reverses Censorship of School Library". School Media Quarterly. 7 (2). Database: ERIC; United States Department of Education: 115–18, 123. OCLC 425808810.
- Krug, Judith F. (1981). "Speech: the 1st Freedom: Locked Books, Locked Minds". Update on Law-Related Education. 5 (1). ERIC; United States Department of Education: 28–33. OCLC 425884329.
- Krug, Judith F. (1989). Libraries and intellectual freedom. Columbia, South Carolina: South Carolina State Library; South Carolina Educational Television Network; (VHS video). OCLC 20054792.
- Krug, Judith F. (October 1991). "The Latest on IF Policies". American Libraries. 22 (9). Database: Arts & Sciences VI: 841. ISSN 0002-9769. OCLC 4895751495.
- Krug, Judith F.; Karen Nussbaum; Gary T Marx; David H Flaherty (1991). Computer-based surveillance of individuals. Topanga, California: Freedom & Privacy Video Library Project (VHS video). OCLC 25623462.
- Krug, Judith F. (April 1992). "Applying Intellectual Freedom Principles". American Libraries. 23 (4). Database: Arts & Sciences VI: 279. ISSN 0002-9769. OCLC 4895752909.
- Krug, Judith F.; Anne Levinson Penway (1993). Confidentiality in Libraries: An Intellectual Freedom Modular Education Program. Chicago, Illinois: American Library Association; Book and Access edition. ISBN 978-0838934203.
- Krug, Judith F. (1995). Political correctness meets netiquette : new frontiers for intellectual freedom in the academic setting. Garden Grove, California: InfoMedix; Association of College and Research Libraries. National Conference; (Audiocassette). OCLC 37541937.
- Krug, Judith F.; David Horowitz (2000). Getting a grip on internet law. Chicago, Illinois: Public Library Association; (Audiocassette). OCLC 45133416.
- Krug, Judith F. (2000). "Internet and Filtering in Libraries: The American Experience". IFLA Journal. 26 (4). München : Verlag Dokumentation; British Library Serials: 284. doi:10.1177/034003520002600408. ISSN 0340-0352. OCLC 95101287. S2CID 62611573.
- Krug, Judith F. (2003). "Foreword". Intellectual freedom 2002 : living the Chinese curse. Library of Congress. Office of the Director for Public Service Collections.; American Library Association. Office for Intellectual Freedom. OCLC 54024484.

=== As contributor ===
- Helen R., Adams; Krug, Judith F. (2005). Privacy in the 21st century : issues for public, school, and academic libraries. Westport, Connecticut: Libraries Unlimited. ISBN 9781591582090. OCLC 57557718.
- Alifano, Alison; Krug, Judith (2001). Pornography on the Internet : a new reality. Mobiltape; Series: 01AALL-B7; (Audiocassette). OCLC 47828690.
- Bobker, Lee R. (director); Krug, Judith F. (executive producer) (1977). The Speaker ... a film about freedom. (starring Mildred Dunnock). American Library Association, Intellectual Freedom Committee; Vision Associates. OCLC 5641089. Archived from the original on December 21, 2021.
- Krug, Judith F. (1976). "In defense of liberty: extremism and other vices". In Braden, Waldo Warder (ed.). Representative American speeches, 1975–1976. New York: H. W. Wilson Co.; Series: Reference shelf; vol. 48, no. 4. ISBN 9780824205980. OCLC 2583982.
- Choldin, Marianna T; Jonathan D Culler; Judith F Krug; Donné Raffat; Sally Placksin (1997). What's the word? : Censorship : how does literature survive?. New York, New York: Modern Language Association; (Audiocassette). OCLC 57705004.
- Delzell, Robert F; Judith F Krug (November 1971). "ALA Awards, Citations, Scholarships, and Grants for 1971". American Libraries. 2 (10). ISSN 0002-9769. OCLC 4895710758.
- Goldberg, Beverly; Judith F Krug (September 1995). "On the Line for the First Amendment". American Libraries. 26 (8). Database: Arts & Sciences VI: 774–778. ISSN 0002-9769. OCLC 4895761179.
- Hedlund, Patric; Krug, Judith F. (1991). Computers, freedom, & privacy. / 10, Computer-based surveillance of individuals. Topanga, California: Computers, Freedom & Privacy Video Library Project; (VHS video). OCLC 42495790.
- Krug, Judith F. (1976). "Intellectual freedom and the rights of children". In Cohen, Monroe D. (ed.). Personal liberty and education. New York: Citation Press. ISBN 9780590094061. OCLC 565561210.
- Krug, Judith F. (1974). "Intellectual freedom. Censorship and an enlightened public". In Cooper, Janet (ed.). Censorship and the schools. Washington, D.C.: National Education Association of the United States (Audiocassette). OCLC 2868601.
- Krug, Judith F. (2002). "ALA and Intellectual Freedom: A Historical Overview". In American Library Association Office for Intellectual Freedom (ed.). Intellectual freedom manual. Chicago, Illinois: American Library Association. ISBN 9780838935194. OCLC 47023478.
- Lynn, Barry W.; Lowell Weicker; Judith F Krug; Oliver S Thomas; Rudy A Pulido (1997). Mobilize America : a national videoconference to stop the religious right. Washington, D.C.: Americans United for Separation of Church and State (VHS video). ISBN 9780961716431. OCLC 43639095.
- Mach, Daniel; Judith F Krug; Beverley C Becker (2002). Intellectual freedom : it's not just a good idea, it's the law!. Chicago, Illinois: Public Library Association; (Audiocassette). OCLC 49848823.
- Mach, Daniel; Candace Morgan; Judith F. Krug (2001). Why filtering is unconstitutional : an update on ALA's legal challenge to CIPA. Chicago, Illinois: American Library Association (VHS video). OCLC 48403876.
- Oboler, Eli M.; Krug (foreword), Judith F. (1983). To free the mind : libraries, technology, and intellectual freedom. Littleton, Colorado: Libraries Unlimited. ISBN 9780872873254. OCLC 9971492.
- Weibel, Stuart L.; James Miller; Eric Miller; Paul Resnick; Judith F Krug (1997). Content selection, PICS and the Internet : a discussion of technologies, problems and solutions. Dublin, Ohio: American Library Association; Office for Intellectual Freedom (VHS video). OCLC 37609333.

== Awards and honors ==
Year	Award / honor	Organization	Notes
1976	Irita Van Doren Award	American Booksellers Association	For her many contributions to the cause of the book as an instrument of culture in American life
1976	Harry Kalven Freedom of Expression Award	American Civil Liberties Union	Presented to the Office for Intellectual Freedom of the American Library Association
1978	Robert B. Downs Intellectual Freedom Award	Graduate School of Library and Information Science, The iSchool at Illinois, University of Illinois at Urbana-Champaign	For her outstanding contribution to the cause of intellectual freedom in libraries
1983	Carl Sandburg Freedom to Read Award	Friends of the Chicago Public Library	The award honors those who take a stand against censorship. Two years after receiving her award, Krug was leader of the committee to select the 1985 recipient.
1984	Open Book Award	Minnesota Civil Liberties Union	
1985	President's Award	Minnesota Civil Liberties Union	
1990	Intellectual Freedom Award	Illinois Library Association	The Intellectual Freedom Award recognizes those who have supported the goals of accessibility to information as advocated by the Illinois Library Association and the American Library Association.
1994	Award for Intellectual Freedom	Ohio Educational Library Media Association	The Intellectual Freedom Award of the Ohio Educational Library Media Association honors those who support the Ohio library system and American Library Association values of free access to information and freedom to read as protected by the First Amendment to the United States Constitution.
1995	Roll of Honor Award	Freedom to Read Foundation	She was honored by American Library Association Executive Director Elizabeth Martinez, for time serving as the executive director of the Freedom to Read Foundation.
1998	Joseph W. Lippincott Award	American Library Association	Described by the ALA as the highest honor of the profession
2005	Doctor of Humane Letters	University of Illinois at Urbana-Champaign	Honorary doctorate
2009	William J. Brennan Award	Thomas Jefferson Center for the Protection of Free Expression	She was only the fifth person selected to receive this award since the award was initiated in 1993. Krug was recognized for her efforts in support of open-mindedness and free access to books.
2009	Judith Krug Memorial Intellectual Freedom Panel	State of the Net Conference; Advisory Committee to the Congressional Internet Caucus	Annual panel initiated in 2009 at the conference

== See also ==
- Censorship in the United States
- Civil liberties in the United States
- Freedom of the press in the United States
- Freedom of speech in the United States
- Free speech fights
- List of librarians
- List of University of Pittsburgh people
