= Library Awareness Program =

American FBI investigation into library patron records

The Library Awareness Program was an operation by the US Federal Bureau of Investigation which attempted to track reading habits of types of library patrons they had deemed suspicious.

== History ==
As early as 1973, the FBI was running a program aimed at securing information about reading habits of many library users; this program was ultimately called the "Library Awareness Program". The Library Awareness Program was designed as a counterintelligence effort that would provide information to the FBI including the names and reading habits of users of many different libraries. The FBI was particularly interested in learning this type of information about foreign diplomats or their agents. Librarians and the public were unaware of this program until 1987 when its existence was made public in an article in the New York Times.

The FBI claimed that one of the major reasons this program was initiated was because hostile intelligence agents had been able to find some information that could be dangerous to the security of the United States. The area of greatest concern was the information at academic libraries that could be accessed through sophisticated databanks used for research. This point was illuminated by the report that a Soviet employee of the United Nations had been able to recruit a college student from Queens to obtain information at the library that was described as "sensitive."

The FBI minimized the significance of the program, saying "Hostile intelligence has had some success working the campuses and libraries... and we’re just going around telling people what to be alert for."

== Public discovery ==
Libraries in New York City that had been the subjects of the FBI visits contacted the New York Library Association (NYLA) about what had happened. They in turn contacted the American Library Association. This led to the opposition of the program by the NYLA, a long time New York Congressman Major R. Owens, and the ALA and resulted in widespread outrage within the field. In October 1987 the ALA's Intellectual Freedom Committee released a statement that explained the threat of this program, and urged libraries not to violate their ethical obligation to protect patrons' rights by providing information to the FBI. The national media picked up the program leading to nationwide awareness of the situation.

In 1988 congressional hearings were conducted on the subject. The purpose of these hearings was to find out what the FBI had been up to in regards to the Library Awareness Program, and whether it was lawful. Congressman Don Edwards who was the Subcommittee Chairman observed when opening the hearing that libraries "...are intended to be havens for scholarly work and quiet relaxation," and that their records "should not be available to intelligence agencies just for the asking."

Following these hearings several FOIA requests were submitted to obtain more information on the subject. The FBI eventually complied with one of the requests and released 37 pages of information about FBI activities related to the program. Through this release it was learned that the actual program name may have been Development of Counterintelligence Among Librarians (DECAL). After the congressional hearings in 1988, many institutions decided to adopt formal policies about what to do in the event that the FBI contacted the library. Most libraries have policies in case of such an event today. Librarians have tried to make it clear that they were not against helping the FBI in general, but rather that they opposed violating the rights of their patrons.

== Current status ==
Since that time the issue has gathered a renewed concern since 9-11, and the Patriot Act. Some people believe that the Patriot Act grants the government the right to inspect patron records without due cause in much the same way as the Library Awareness Program. Many library patrons complain about the difference between passive surveillance of a patron's information and the FBI's active role in censoring online information and the free access to information.

== Selected bibliography ==
- Foerstel, Herbert N. Surveillance in the Stacks: The FBI's Library Awareness Program. New York: Greenwood Press, 1991. ISBN 978-0-313-26715-4
- McFadden, Robert D. (September 18, 1987). "F.B.I. in New York Asks Librarians' Aid In Reporting on Spies". The New York Times. p. 1.
