= Elizabeth W. Stone =

American librarian

President of the American Library Association
- In office 1981–1982
- Preceded by: Peggy Sullivan
- Succeeded by: Carol A. Nemeyer

Personal details
- Born: June 21, 1918 Dayton, Ohio, US
- Died: March 6, 2002 (aged 83) Washington, D.C., US
- Education: American University
- Occupation: Librarian

Elizabeth W. Stone (June 21, 1918 – March 6, 2002) was an American librarian and educator and president of the American Library Association from 1981 to 1982. In 1986 she was honored with the Joseph W. Lippincott Award.In 1988 she was awarded American Library Association Honorary Membership. In 1998 she was honored with the Beta Phi Mu Award for distinguished service to education for librarianship.

== Education ==
Stone received her master's degree in library science in 1961 from the Catholic University of America. She joined the faculty of the Catholic University of America that same year. She went on to get her doctorate in public administration from the American University in 1968 and was named chair of Catholic University's Department of Library Science in 1972. The department became a School of Library and Information Science in 1981 and she retired in 1983. The Dr. Elizabeth W. Stone Lecture series was established in 1991 for her service to the school and the library profession.

== Career ==
Stone developed a plan for continuing library and information science education for the National Commission on Libraries and Information Science. She proposed establishment of a Continuing Library Education Network and Exchange (CLENE). This was incorporated in 1975. In 1982 a proposal to move CLENE to the American Library Association was presented and deferred. Within the American Library Association a Continuing Library Education Network and Exchange Round Table (CLENERT) was established in 1984. In 1985, Stone sponsored the first World Conference on Continuing Professional Education for the Library and Information Professions immediately before the Chicago Conference of the International Federation of Library Associations and Institutions (IFLA). As a result of this meeting, the Continuing Professional Education Round Table (CPERT) of IFLA was established.

== Later life ==
After retirement, Stone continued to be an advocate for continuing education of librarians.

She served as the librarian and archivist of the National Presbyterian Church where her husband had been a minister for 25 years.

Non-profit organization positions
Preceded by Peggy Sullivan	President of the American Library Association; 1981–1982	Succeeded by Carol A. Nemeyer
