= Carl H. Milam =

American librarian (1884–1963)

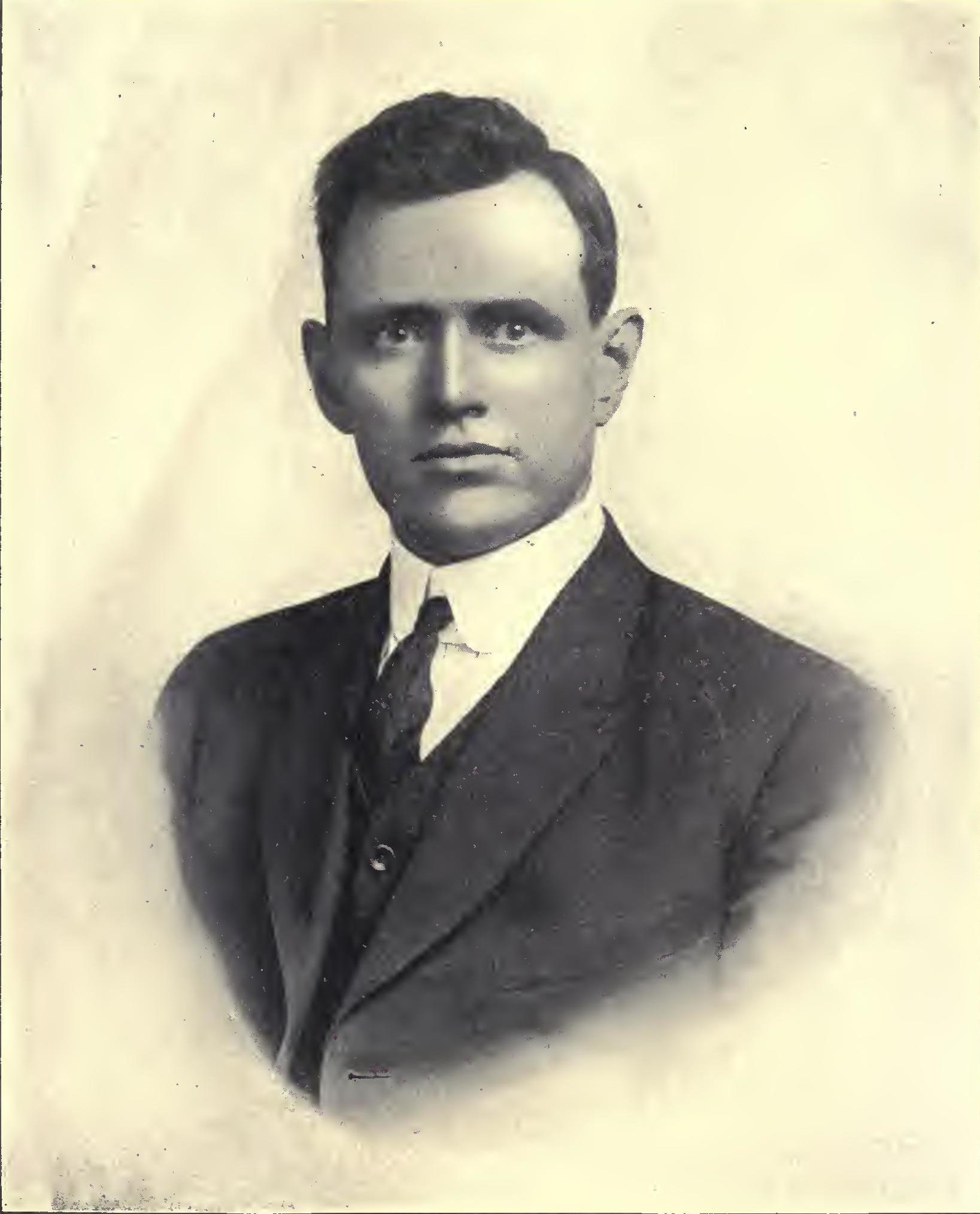
- Born: October 22, 1884; Harper County
- Died: August 23, 1963 (aged 78); Barrington
- Alma mater: University of Oklahoma
- Occupation: Librarian
- Awards: Joseph W. Lippincott Award (1948); American Library Association Honorary Membership (1954)

Carl H. Milam (October 22, 1884 – August 23, 1963) held many positions and made many contributions to the field of American library science. He was noted in an issue of American Libraries as one of the one hundred "most important leaders we had in the 20th century". Known mostly for his lengthy career at the American Library Association (1920–1948), he served as a leader in the association and earned the title “Mr. ALA”. Mentioned throughout the pages of A History of the American Library Association 1876-1972, Milam has proved to be an influential figure in his long history at the ALA and in the field of librarianship. He was at the forefront in providing ideas, public relations strategies, services throughout World War I and World War II, and work in the international field.

== Personal life ==
Although Milam was born in Kansas, he had roots in Oklahoma as he spent his childhood there. He grew up on a family farm and was related to Benjamin Milam, known for leading troops into San Antonio in the "settlers' 1835 revolt against Mexico".

He married Nell Robinson in May 1910 and they adopted a daughter, Margery, in 1914. They eventually had a child in 1918, and named her Mary.

Although he was a very busy man, he recorded his pastimes such as gardening and fishing in the diary he kept while he was at the UN library.

== Education and early career ==
Milam attended New York State Library School, established by Melvil Dewey, after he completed a major in English at the University of Oklahoma. He began to search for a career and finally landed a job at the library at Purdue University. He took positions following this one on the Indiana Public Library Commission and later as director of the Birmingham Public Library. At the Birmingham Public Library he was able to promote the value of public libraries to the public, raise funds, and expand the library system drastically to six branches. He would use the skills he gained through these positions to become a leader in the ALA.

== War time ==
World War I saw many changes in ways of life and in librarianship as well. In 1917, Milam put his career at the Birmingham Public Library on hold in order to be a part of the Library War Service. This organization was labeled as one of the “Seven Sisters” in wartime, in a similar category with organizations that provided services to those involved with the war. Camp libraries were set up for those serving overseas, and librarians agreed that they played a pivotal role in educating the public and establishing national identity.

Herbert Putnam, director of the organization, traveled overseas in December 1918 and placed Milam in the position of interim director, though he would later become permanent director. He was responsible for the general operating of the organization and had a considerable number of tasks related to local and overseas co-ordination. Milam proved to be a central figure in the wartime effort, and the Library War Service did much for librarians in the areas of exposure and funding.

Following the war, Milam wanted to ensure that the progress and exposure libraries and librarianship had gained would remain, and he became director of the "Enlarged Program" in 1919. Milam had believed that this program would "continue on that scale to the glory of libraries and the ALA", but funding was a major issue and they were unable to maintain the program.

During World War II and while with the ALA, Milam began to strategize and develop plans for the period following the war. He worked with a number of individuals to provide figures which illustrated that the field of library science would be able to employ many librarians and ex-servicemen and women following the war. Around the time, Milam was especially outspoken, sharing his opinions on policies with the government and providing suggestions to the Librarian of Congress.

== American Library Association (1920-1948) ==
Milam proved to be a pivotal figure in the American Library Association, not only because of his long career there, but because ALA presidential terms only lasted a year. Therefore, the secretary and executive secretary kept the momentum going and the association would essentially rest on his shoulders. He was able to make recommendations to the executive board and other committees within the Association, showing an unprecedented amount of leadership throughout his time there. Peggy Sullivan outlines that many of Milam's ideas or proposals would end up in the minutes of executive meetings, followed by the statement "at the recommendation of the secretary."

Milam focused his efforts on the areas of personnel, finances and fundraising, aid from the federal government, and public relations. Notably, he pushed for pensions and annuities for the staff, and was generally successful. The end was bittersweet due to criticisms of his work toward the end of his ALA career. He was eventually nominated for president of the ALA in the year following his resignation, 1949, but the whole situation would prove to be an embarrassment due to the previous criticisms, and he was not elected.

In 1954 he was awarded American Library Association Honorary Membership.

Milam's career at the ALA offered him many opportunities to work and attend conferences abroad and in Latin America. As part of the International Relations Office at the ALA, he went on several trips visiting and getting to know the people and the libraries abroad. He worked closely with Sarah C.N. Bogle, director of the American Library in Paris education program, for a number of years, and considered the library his office while traveling in Paris. International work with the ALA had developed as an area of interest for him, and when the United Nations position was offered to him, it is not surprising that he took interest.

== United Nations Library (1948–1950) ==
When Milam was offered a position at the United Nations Library during the criticism he was facing at the ALA, he weighed the pros and cons of accepting the position, and accepted. With the official title of “Director of the Division of Library Services”, he focused on “his chief concerns” of “budget and personnel”. This was probably due to his successes in these areas in his previous positions. He and the UN library had identified problem areas such as organization within the library and within personnel, and Milam developed solutions. He wrote about these experiences in the personal diary he kept throughout his time in the position from 1948 to 1950. Dale argues that “his arrival marked the beginning of two of the most exciting years in the history of the United Nations Library.”

Milam had much to offer the United Nations Library, and certainly left his mark in the profession of library science throughout his career. He respectfully resigned in order to care for his ill wife in 1950, but he continued to be a prominent figure in the field until his death in the summer of 1963.
