= David Horace Clift =

American librarian (1907–1973)

- Born: June 16, 1907; Washington, Kentucky
- Died: October 12, 1973 (aged 66)
- Occupation: Librarian
- Known for: Chief Executive of the American Library Association 1951–72

David Horace Clift (June 16, 1907 – October 12, 1973) was a noted American librarian and former chief executive of the American Library Association (ALA) from 1951 to 1972. He was named by the ALA as one of the 100 Most Important [Library] Leaders of the 20th Century.

== Biography ==
Clift was born in Washington, Kentucky, on June 16, 1907, to Charles L. Sr. and Mary E. (Tomlin) Clift. He attended and graduated from the University of Kentucky in 1930. During his college years, he briefly worked at the Lexington Public Library. After graduation from Kentucky University, he attended Columbia University School of Library Service, graduating in 1931.

== Career ==
After graduating from Columbia University in 1931, Clift found employment at the New York Public Library in the reference section. Drafted into the army in 1942, Clift eventually found himself working for the Office of Strategic Services where he was named executive director of the Interdepartmental Committee for the Acquisition of Foreign Publications, reporting to OSS Executive Director Frederick Kilgour, with whom Clift had become acquainted at the Columbia University Library.

Clift's experience in the OSS had a profound effect on him as an organizer. "[He] was exposed, for example to the ambitious project known as Armed Forces Editions, a program that introduced hundreds of thousands of GIs to paperback books…" Clift was honorably discharged from the Army in 1945.

In 1945–1946, Clift traveled to Germany for the Library of Congress in order to acquire for American research libraries publications which had appeared in enemy countries during the war. Next, Clift took on the role of associate librarian at Yale University. While at Yale, he also became a fellow of Trumbull College and developed a position classification and pay plan that became a model for academic librarians. He was president of the Connecticut Library Association from 1950 to 1951. Clift assumed position of chief executive of the American Library Association in 1951 and served until 1972.

=== Tenure at ALA ===
In 1951, when Clift took over executive duties for ALA, membership was 19,701 and the general funds budget was $191,129. From May 7 to June 5, 1961, Clift was head of the United States Delegation of Librarians while visiting the Soviet Union under the Cultural Exchange Agreement. He was responsible for moving the association's headquarters from rented space to a permanent location in an abandoned mansion in Chicago. He oversaw the promotion and advancement of library growth and literacy growth in America and the world. He also supported the Intellectual Freedom advancements. When Clift retired in 1972, ALA membership had risen to over 30,000 and the general funds budget was over $2 million.

Clift was honored with the Association's Joseph W. Lippincott Award in 1966. He was honored with the American Library Association Honorary Membership in 1972. A special issue of American Libraries titled, "Two Decisive Decades: 1952 to 1972: Festschrift Issue Honoring David H. Clift" was published.

Clift died on October 12, 1973.

On his role as an association executive, he is quoted as saying "it was to administer the policies decided by membership and leave the leadership to those elected by the membership."

== Selected publications ==
- Clift, David H. (Winter 1955). Clift, David H. (ed.). "Library Associations in the United States and British Commonwealth". Library Trends. 3 (3).
- Clift, David H.; Lacy, Dan (1956). National Society for the Study of Education (ed.). How Books Get to Adult Readers. Fifty-fifth Yearbook of the National Society for the Study of Education, Part II. Chicago: University of Chicago Press.
- Ellsworth, Ralph E.; Clift, David H. (October 1961). "Critique of Library Associations in America [with Discussion]". The Library Quarterly. 31 (4): 382–400.
- Clift, David Horace (April 1963). "Role of Library Associations, a Symposium". Bulletin of the Medical Library Association. 51: 44–49.
- Clift, David H. (September 1965). "After the ALA Reorganization". ALA Bulletin. 59 (8): 727–732.
