= Banned Books Week =

Annual awareness campaign

- Observed by: United States
- Significance: Celebrates freedom to read, draws attention to banned books and the persecuted
- Duration: 1 week
- Frequency: Annual

Banned Books Week is an annual awareness campaign promoted by the American Library Association and the American Booksellers Association, that celebrates the freedom to read, draws attention to banned and challenged books, and highlights persecuted individuals. Held in late September or early October since 1982, the United States campaign "stresses the importance of ensuring the availability of those unorthodox or unpopular viewpoints to all who wish to read them" and the requirement to keep material publicly available so that people can develop their own conclusions and opinions. The international campaign notes individuals "persecuted because of the writings that they produce, circulate or read." Some of the events that occur during Banned Book Week are The Virtual Read-Out and The First Amendment Film Festival.

== History ==
Banned Books Week was founded in 1982 by First Amendment and library activist Judith Krug. Krug said that the Association of American Publishers contacted her with ideas to bring banned books "to the attention of the American public" after a "slew of books" had been banned that year. Krug relayed the information to the American Library Association's Intellectual Freedom Committee, and "six weeks later we celebrated the first Banned Books Week."

Since 2011, the American Association of School Librarians (AASL) has designated the Wednesday of Banned Books Week as Banned Websites Awareness Day. Their goal is "to bring attention to the overly aggressive filtering of educational and social websites used by students and educators." In the AASL's 2012 national longitudinal survey, 94% of respondents said their school used filtering software, with the majority of blocked websites relating to social networking (88%), IM or online chatting (74%), gaming (69%), and video services like YouTube (66%). The AASL's position is that "the social aspect of learning" is important for students in the 21st century and that many schools go "beyond the requirements set forth by the Federal Communications Commission in its Child Internet Protection Act."

Since 2021, the event has featured events with honorary chairs, beginning with novelist Jason Reynolds in 2021. In April 2022, PEN America released a report titled "Banned in the USA" revealing an increase in book banning in the United States since 2021. Student activism against book banning also increased. For the 2022 event, author George M. Johnson was named the Author Honorary Chair for their banned memoir, All Boys Aren't Blue, and student activist Cameron Samuels was named the first Youth Honorary Chair for distributing banned books in the Katy Independent School District in Texas. In 2023, actor and literary advocate LeVar Burton was recognized as the Honorary Chair with student advocate Da'Taeveyon Daniels as the Youth Honorary Chair. In 2025, actor and activist George Takei was named Honorary Chair, and freshman college student Iris Mogul was named Honorary Youth Chair.

== United States event ==
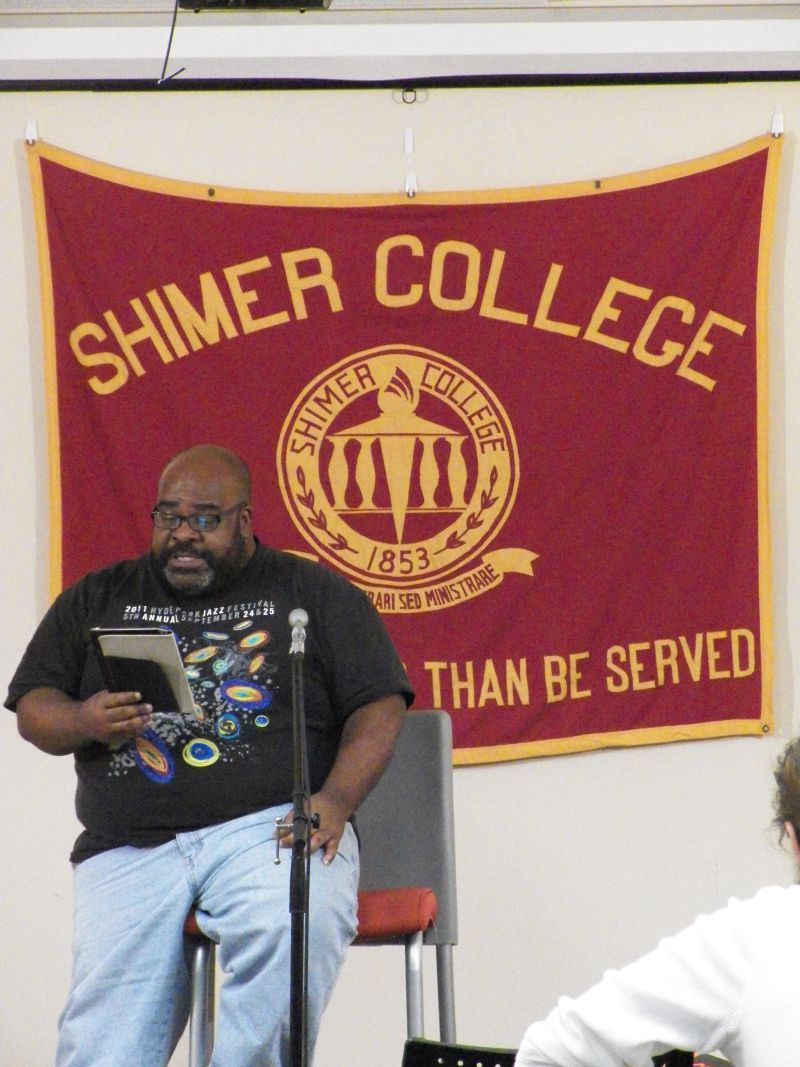
A Banned Books Week "read out" at Shimer College

The event has been held during the last full week of September since 1982. Banned Books Week is intended to encourage readers to examine challenged literary works and to promote intellectual freedom in libraries, schools, and bookstores. Its goal is "to teach the importance of our First Amendment rights and the power of literature, and to draw attention to the danger that exists when restraints are imposed on the availability of information in a free society." Offering Banned Books Week kits, the ALA sells posters, buttons, and bookmarks to celebrate the event.

Educational facilities celebrate banned and challenged books during this week, often creating displays and programs around the awareness campaign. Additionally, booksellers sponsor activities and events in support of Banned Books Week. Some retailers create window displays, while others invite authors of banned and challenged materials to speak at their stores, as well as funding annual essay contests about freedom of expression. Educational facilities and booksellers also sponsor "read outs," allowing participants to read aloud passages from their favorite banned books.

== International event ==
Amnesty International celebrates Banned Books Week by directing attention to individuals "persecuted because of the writings that they produce, circulate or read." Its web site documents "focus cases" annually which show individuals who have been reportedly killed, incarcerated, or otherwise harassed by national authorities around the world, and urge people to "take action" to help it in partnership with its "Urgent Action Network" by contacting authorities regarding human rights violations. They also provide updates to cases from previous years, giving a history and current status of people who have been allegedly persecuted for their writings. The cases include individuals from Azerbaijan, China, Cuba, Egypt, Gambia, Iran, Myanmar, Russia, and Sri Lanka.

Some libraries outside the United States have participated in the campaign. In 2016, for the first time in the UK, Islington Libraries participated in the campaign. Then Islington council member Asima Shaikh noted that “Islington – one-time home of George Orwell, with its rich history of radical thought, creative expression, and innovation – is the perfect place to celebrate Banned Books Week."

== Reception and criticism ==
The event has been praised for celebrating the freedom provided by the First Amendment to the United States Constitution. Public events where banned and challenged books are read aloud are commonly held to celebrate the event. The international event held by Amnesty International has also been praised for reminding people about the price that some people pay for expressing controversial views.

Boston Globe columnist Jeff Jacoby observed in 2001 that the overwhelming number of books on the list were books that were simply challenged (primarily by parents for violence, language, sexuality, or age-appropriateness), not actually removed.

Mitchell Muncy, writing in The Wall Street Journal in 2009, says that the censorship being protested in the event does not exist, and that books are not banned in the United States. Camila Alire, a former president of the ALA, responded that Banned Books Week highlights "the hundreds of documented attempts to suppress access to information that take place each year across the U.S.," and that "when the library is asked to restrict access for others, that does indeed reflect an attempt at censorship."

Former ALA Councilor Jessamyn West said:

It also highlights the thing we know about Banned Books Week that we don't talk about much—the bulk of these books are challenged by parents for being age-inappropriate for children. While I think this is still a formidable thing for librarians to deal with, it's totally different from people trying to block a book from being sold at all.

Doug Archer, librarian and past chair of the ALA's Intellectual Freedom Committee, responds that such criticisms do not fairly address the threat of censorship:

The argument goes thusly. Most books on the annual ALA list of banned and challenged books were "only" challenged, never banned. Even if some were removed from libraries, they are still available for purchase in bookstores. Therefore, censorship hasn't really happened because the government hasn't banned the books. .... Just because libraries and librarians have been so good at defending the freedom of the public to read as they choose, means that we're being dishonest? No, it just means we're doing our job.

Focus on the Family, a conservative Christian organization, regularly challenges Banned Books Week, claiming that books are not really banned, and that libraries' policies are anti-family. Tom Minnery, vice president of public policy, said, "The ALA has irresponsibly perpetrated the 'banned' books lie for too long...Nothing is 'banned,' but every year this organization attempts to intimidate and silence any parent, teacher or librarian who expresses concern about the age-appropriateness of sexually explicit or violent material for schoolchildren." Candi Cushman, Focus on the Family's education analyst, said that "parents have every right and responsibility to object to their kids receiving sexually explicit and pro-gay literature without their permission, especially in a school setting"; pointing out that the children's book And Tango Makes Three, about same-sex penguin parents, was one of the books at the top of ALA's most-challenged list, she criticized the event for its "promotion of homosexuality to...6- or 7-year-old [children] against their will." The group Parents and Friends of Ex-Gays and Gays (PFOX) has similarly criticized the ALA for not using the event to champion ex-gay books or books opposing same-sex marriage in the United States.

Ruth Graham argued in Slate that the rhetoric surrounding the event often conflates issues such as banning books in a public library versus a school library. She wrote that it confuses failure to include material in curricula to overall availability in a library. She believes that, while it may be worthwhile to highlight cases of censorship, the emphasis should be on a celebration of the minimal number of banned books.

In response, Maddie Crum of HuffPost wrote in defense of Banned Books Week, saying that the celebration of Banned Books Week raises consciousness of the importance of free expression in society. She praised librarians' role, writing that "They do the behind-the-scenes work that ensures challenges don't turn into bans."

== See also ==
- Book banning in the United States (2021–present)
- List of books banned by governments
- Books in the United States
- List of destroyed libraries
- Book burning
