= New Mexico State Library =

Coordinates: 35.6571°N 105.9837°W

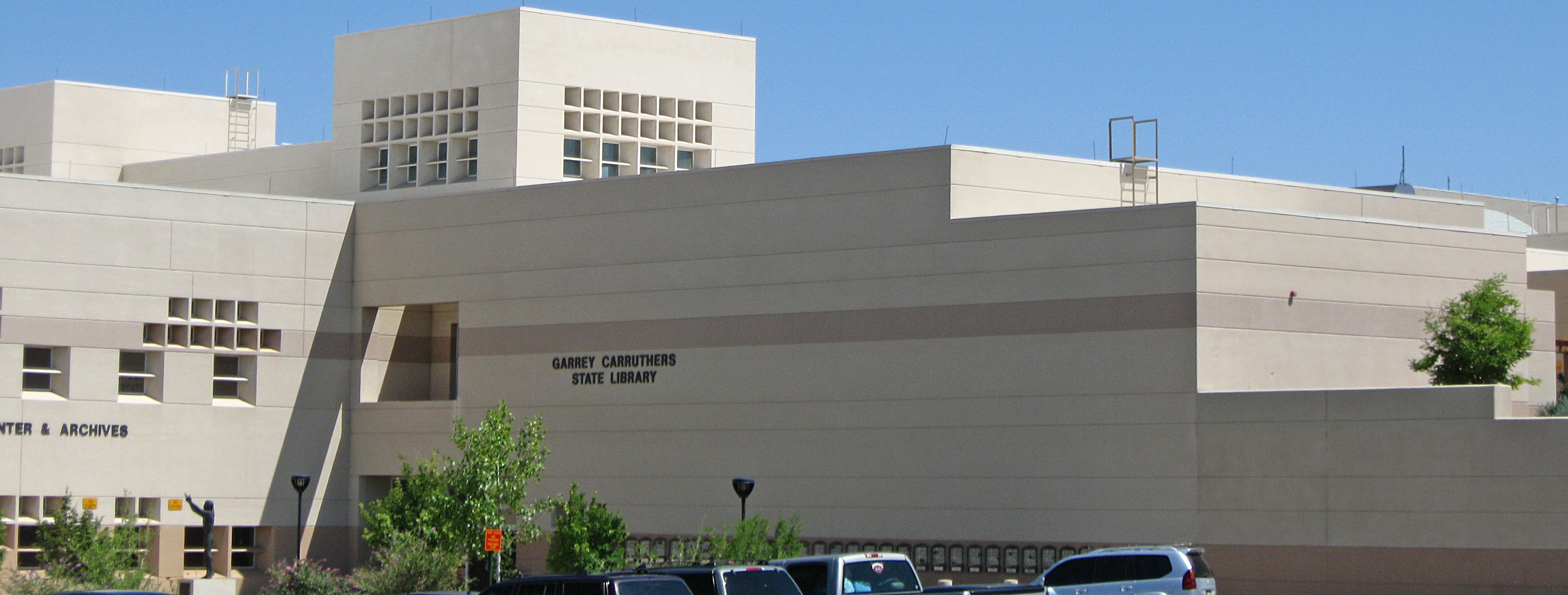
New Mexico State Library building in 2009

The New Mexico State Library is a government library in Santa Fe.

== History ==
The library was established by an act of the New Mexico Legislature in 1961 from the library extension service that had previously been part of the Museum of New Mexico.

== Collection and programs ==
The library uses the Dewey Decimal system for its catalog. Notable parts of the collection are the Southwest Collection and publications from the state and federal government. In addition to lending and preserving materials, the state library also provides funds to public libraries throughout New Mexico and runs a rural bookmobile.

== See also ==
- List of libraries in the United States
