= Carrie C Robinson =

American educator and librarian

Carrie C. Robinson
- Born: April 21, 1906; Madison County, Mississippi
- Died: May 25, 2008 (aged 102); Montgomery, Alabama
- Occupation: Librarian
- Spouse: Thomas L. Robinson
- Parent(s): James S and Cordelia Julia Harris Coleman

Carrie Coleman Robinson (April 21, 1906 - May 25, 2008) was an African American educator and librarian. Robinson was a founding trustee of the Freedom to Read Foundation and a founder of the Alabama Association of School Librarians.

== Biography ==
Robinson was born in Madison County, Mississippi in 1906.

=== Early life and education ===
Robinson graduated from Tougaloo College in 1931. She then attended library school at Hampton Institute.

In 1948, she was denied admission to University of Alabama to take library science classes because she was Black. She enrolled at the University of Illinois in the master's degree program instead.

She pursued a doctorate from Illinois in 1953, but left her position after family problems and a doctoral advisor who insisted she focus her dissertation on a white school program.

=== Early career ===
From 1932 to 1946, Robinson worked at various colleges as head librarian in Kentucky, South Carolina, Texas, Mississippi, Louisiana, and Georgia.

In 1946, She was hired part-time by Alabama State College as a consultant on school libraries and an assistant professor of library education.

At that time, Black librarians could not join the Alabama Library Association. She helped organize a section of the Alabama State Teachers Association in 1947, which eventually became the Alabama Association of School Librarians, which were both entirely Black organizations.

From 1962 to 1973, Robinson worked as the Negro School Library Supervisor in Alabama Department of Education.

In 1966, the Elementary and Secondary Education Act made federal funds available to states to improve secondary school libraries. Their list of qualified candidates excluded Robinson. She was passed over in favor of a white librarian with lesser qualifications. Department officials did not advertise the position among Black people the same way they did white people. Robinson was appointed to a lower rank position to supervise elementary school libraries.

=== Department of Education Lawsuit ===
On May 14, 1969, Robinson filed a complaint with the U.S. District Court that because of her race, she was denied equal protection as an employee of the Alabama State Department of Education. Not long after, her department was reorganized and relocated into a tiny workspace with 5 other employees.

The Alabama Department of Education denied her allegations of discrimination. In response, on December 23, 1969, the National Education Association (NEA) and Black Alabama State Teachers Association filed a class action suit on Robinson's behalf. They argued that the Alabama Department of Education had discriminated against her and violated her First, Fifth, Thirteenth, and Fourteenth Amendment rights. The suit argued that she had been ignored for the supervisor position and the department hired a white woman "whose qualifications were 'far inferior' to Robinson's."

E. J. Josey and a white colleague asked for AASL to file an amicus brief for Robinson, but neither ALA nor AASL did so. Robinson was a board member for AASL and an ALA Councilor at Large at the time. Neither organization filed any briefs in court cases brought by Black southerners in cases related to discrimination in segregated public libraries.

The case concluded on October 6, 1970. Both parties reached an agreement where Robinson was promoted to Educational Consultant III, in a department where none of the three Black employees were higher than rank II, with a salary increase and payment of all her legal fees.

=== Later career ===
In 1969, Robinson was a founding trustee of the Freedom to Read Foundation. She remained a trustee until 1974.

Robinson became the Auburn University director of the library media program in 1972.

Robinson retired in 1975.

=== Marriage and children ===
Carrie married Thomas L. Robinson on Jun 12, 1935.

=== Death and afterward ===
Robinson died in Montgomery, Alabama, on May 25, 2008.

== Published works ==
- Robinson, Carrie C. 1954. "Evaluating School Library Services." In H. Lancour (ed). The school library supervisor : a report of an institute on school library supervision held at the University of Illinois Library School, October 3-6, 1954. Urbana, Il: Graduate School of Library Science: 60-71.
- Robinson, Carrie C. 1970. “First by Circumstance.” In The Black Librarian in America, edited by E. J. Josey. Metuchen, NJ: Scarecrow.

== Recognition ==
Robinson was a member of the following organizations:

- Women's Fellowship, 1946-;
- American Library Assn, 1946-;
- American Assn of School Librarians, 1946–76;
- Alabama Assn of School Librarians, 1947–75;
- Alabama Library Assn, 1949–75;
- ALA Committee of Accreditation of Library Schools, 4 years;

member, Standards Committee, American Assn of School Libraries, 4 years;

- life member, National Education Association;
- cofounder, School of Library Media, Alabama A&M University, 1969;
- trustee, Freedom to Read Foundation, 1969–74;
- Women's Fellowship, First Congregational Christian Church of Montgomery, AL, 1946-, mem of the trustee board, 1992-, chair of mission and outreach committee, teacher of church school.

Awards and honors:

- Alabama LAMP Workshops, Meritorious Service Award, 1979;
- Southern Poverty Law Center, Outstanding Service to Cause of Human Rights and Equal Justice, Certificate, 1990;
- Freedom to Read Foundation Award for, School Library Administration, Library Educator, Intellectual Freedom Advocate, Service and Commitment, 1991;
- Alabama Assn of School Librarians' Award; Distinguished Service, 1947–70;
- Personalities of the South Award, 1976–77;
- Alpha Kappa Alpha Sorority Award for Courageous Pursuit and Accomplishments in Civil Rights, 1971;
- Black Caucus of ALA Award, 1974;
- Alumnae of the Year Award, Tougaloo College, 1970;
- Distinguished Service Award, Alabama Library Assn, 1980.

Special Achievements:

- Alabama LAMP Workshops, Meritorious Service Award, 1979;
- Southern Poverty Law Center, Outstanding Service to Cause of Human Rights and Equal Justice, 1990;
- Freedom to Read Foundation, School Library Administration, Library Educator, Intellectual Freedom Advocate, Service and Commitment, 1991.
