= American Library Association =

American professional society

- Logo
- Abbreviation: ALA
- Formation: October 6, 1876; 150 years ago
- Type: Nonprofit; NGO
- Headquarters: Chicago, Illinois, U.S.
- Location(s): Chicago and Washington, D.C., U.S.
- Region served: United States
- Members: 46,564 (2025)
- Executive Director: Daniel Montgomery
- President: Maria McCauley
- Staff: approx. 165
- Website: ala.org

The American Library Association (ALA) is a nonprofit organization based in the United States that promotes libraries and library education internationally. The organization is the oldest and largest library association in the world.

== History ==
=== 19th century ===
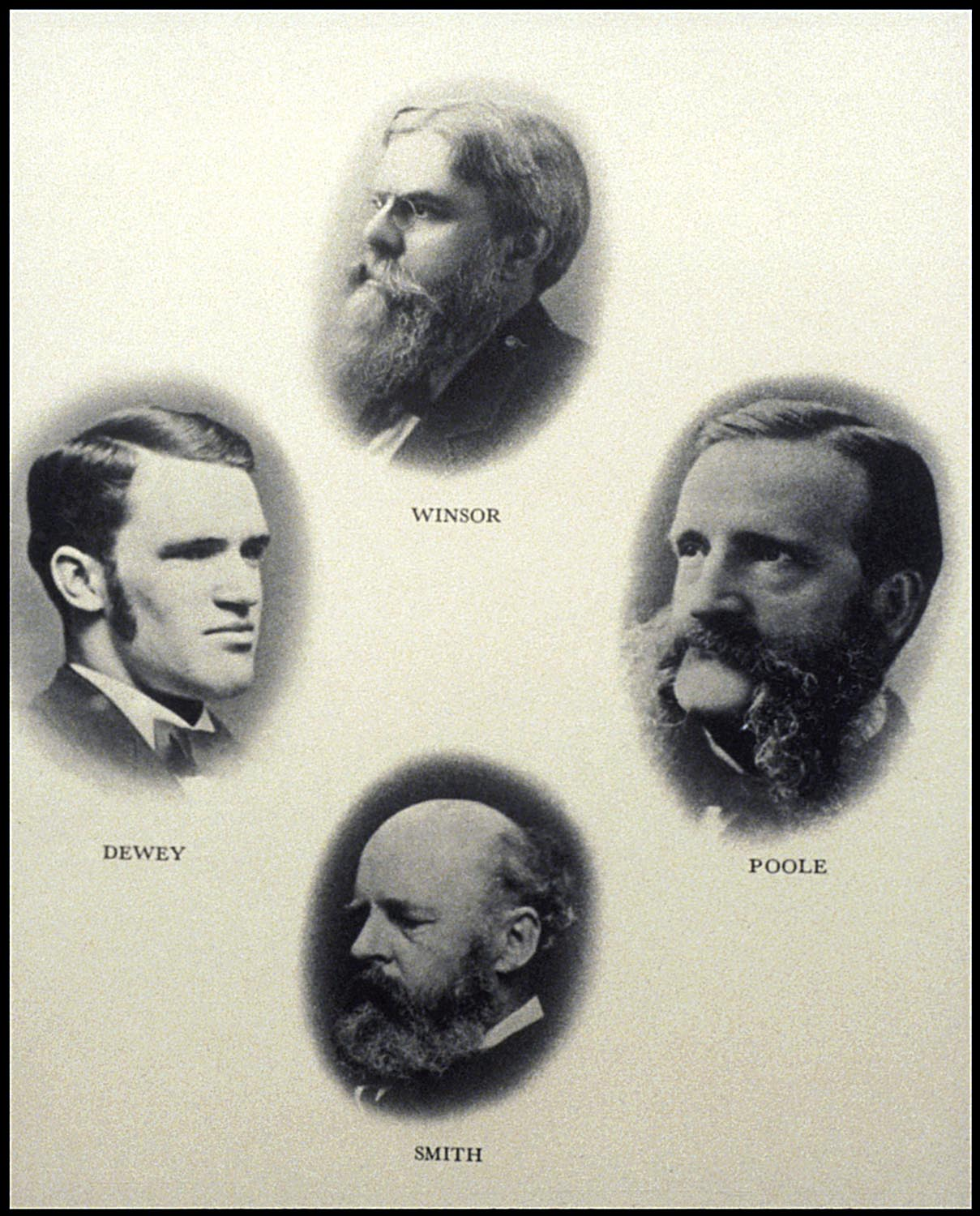
American Library Association 1876 Organizing Committee: Melvil Dewey, Justin Winsor, William F. Poole, and Lloyd P. Smith

During the Centennial Exposition in Philadelphia in 1876, 103 librarians (90 men and 13 women) responded to a call for a "Convention of Librarians" to be held October 4–6, 1876, at the Historical Society of Pennsylvania.

In his seminal essay "ALA at 100", Edward G. Holley describes how "the register was passed around for all to sign who wished to become charter members" at the end of the meeting, which is why the date of the founding of the ALA is considered to be October 6, 1876 (150 years ago).

Among the 103 librarians in attendance were:

- Justin Winsor (Boston Public Library and Harvard University)
- William Frederick Poole (Chicago Public Library and Newberry College)
- Charles Ammi Cutter (Boston Athenæum)
- Melvil Dewey
- Charles Evans (Indianapolis Public Library)
- Richard Rogers Bowker

Attendees came from as far west as Chicago and from England. Another important founder was Frederick Leypoldt, publisher of Library Journal, who published the conference proceedings.

In 1879, the ALA was chartered in Massachusetts. From 1876 until 1885, Justin Winsor served as the first president of the ALA. Many early presidents were also officers in the Bibliographical Society of America.

=== 20th century ===
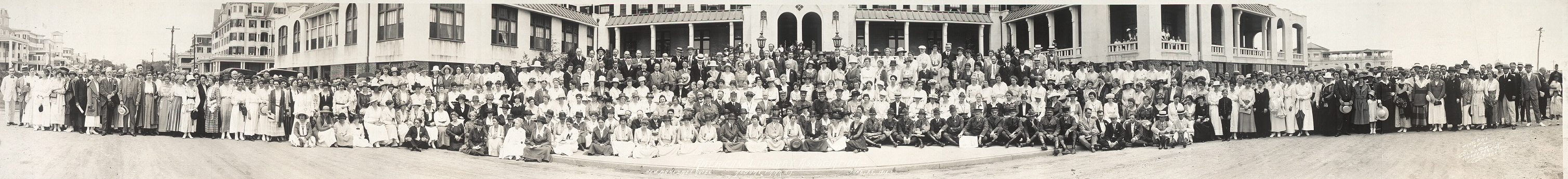
American Library Association conference at New Monterey Hotel in Asbury Park, New Jersey, June 25, 1919

During World War I the ALA Executive Board initiated by Walter Lewis Brown established the Library War Service Committee to supply books and periodicals to military personnel at home and overseas. The American Library in Paris was founded as part of this effort.

Early work by librarians included "traveling libraries", now known more commonly as bookmobiles, c. 1917–1918.

In the 1930s, library activists pressured the American Library Association to be more responsive to issues such as peace, segregation, library unions, and intellectual freedom. In 1931, the Junior Members Round Table (JMRT) was formed to provide a voice for the younger members of the ALA.

The first Library Bill of Rights (LBR) was drafted by Forrest Spaulding to set a standard against censorship and was adopted by the ALA in 1939. This has been recognized as the moment defining modern librarianship as a profession committed to intellectual freedom and the right to read. ALA appointed a committee to study censorship and recommend policy after the banning of the novel The Grapes of Wrath in Kern County, California and the implementation of the Library Bill of Rights. The committee reported in 1940 that intellectual freedom and professionalism were linked and recommended a permanent committee – Committee on Intellectual Freedom. The ALA made revisions to strengthen the Library Bill of Rights in June 1948, approved the Statement on Labeling in 1951 to discourage labeling material as subversive, and adopted the Freedom to Read Statement and the Overseas Library Statement in 1953. The ALA has worked throughout its history to define, extend, protect and advocate for equity of access to information.

In 1945, the ALA established an Office in Washington, D.C. named the National Relations Office under the direction of Paul Howard.

In 1961, the ALA took a stand regarding service to African Americans and others, advocating for equal library service for all. An amendment to the Library Bill of Rights was passed in 1961 that made clear that an individual's library use should not be denied or abridged because of race, religion, national origin, or political views. Some communities decided to close their doors rather than desegregate. In 1963, the ALA commissioned a study, Access to Public Libraries, which found direct and indirect discrimination in American libraries.

In 1967, some librarians protested against a pro-Vietnam War speech given by General Maxwell D. Taylor at the annual ALA conference in San Francisco; the former president of Sarah Lawrence College, Harold Taylor, spoke to the Middle-Atlantic Regional Library Conference about socially responsible professionalism; and less than one year later a group of librarians proposed that the ALA schedule a new round table program discussion on the social responsibilities of librarians at its annual conference in Kansas City. This group called themselves the Organizing Committee for the ALA Round Table on Social Responsibilities of Libraries. This group drew in many other under-represented groups in the ALA who lacked power, including the Congress for Change in 1969. This formation of the committee was approved in 1969 and would change its name to the Social Responsibilities Round Table (SRRT) in 1971. After its inception, the Round Table of Social Responsibilities began to press ALA leadership to address issues such as library unions, working conditions, wages, and intellectual freedom.

The Freedom to Read Foundation was founded by Judith Krug, Alexander Allain, and Carrie C Robinson and established by ALA's executive board in 1969.

==== Centennial ====
The American Library Association celebrated its centennial in 1976. In commemoration the association published Libraries and the Life of the Mind in America.

The American Library Association Archives, established at the time of the centennial, created an online exhibit which includes a history of the centennial. Clara Stanton Jones, president, Inaugural address was titled, "The First Step into ALA's Second Century."

==== 1976–2000 ====
In 1979 and 1991 the ALA collaborated with the National Commission on Libraries and Information Science on two White House Conferences.

In 1983 in response to the National Commission on Excellence in Education Report, A Nation at Risk, leaders in library and information science launched the project, "Libraries and the Learning Society." Librarians examined how public libraries, academic libraries, library and information science training institutions, and school library media centers could best respond to A Nation at Risk.

In June 1990, the ALA approved "Policy on Library Services to the Poor" and in 1996 the Task Force on Hunger, Homelessness, and Poverty was formed to resurrect and promote the ALA guidelines on library services to the poor.

The Office for Information Technology Policy was established in 1995 to act as a public policy advocate for libraries in the area of information technology.

The "Congress on Professional Education" took place from April 30 to May 1, 1999, in Washington, D.C. Its purpose was to reach consensus among stakeholder groups on the values and core competencies of the profession and on strategies for action to address common issues and concerns.

=== 21st century ===
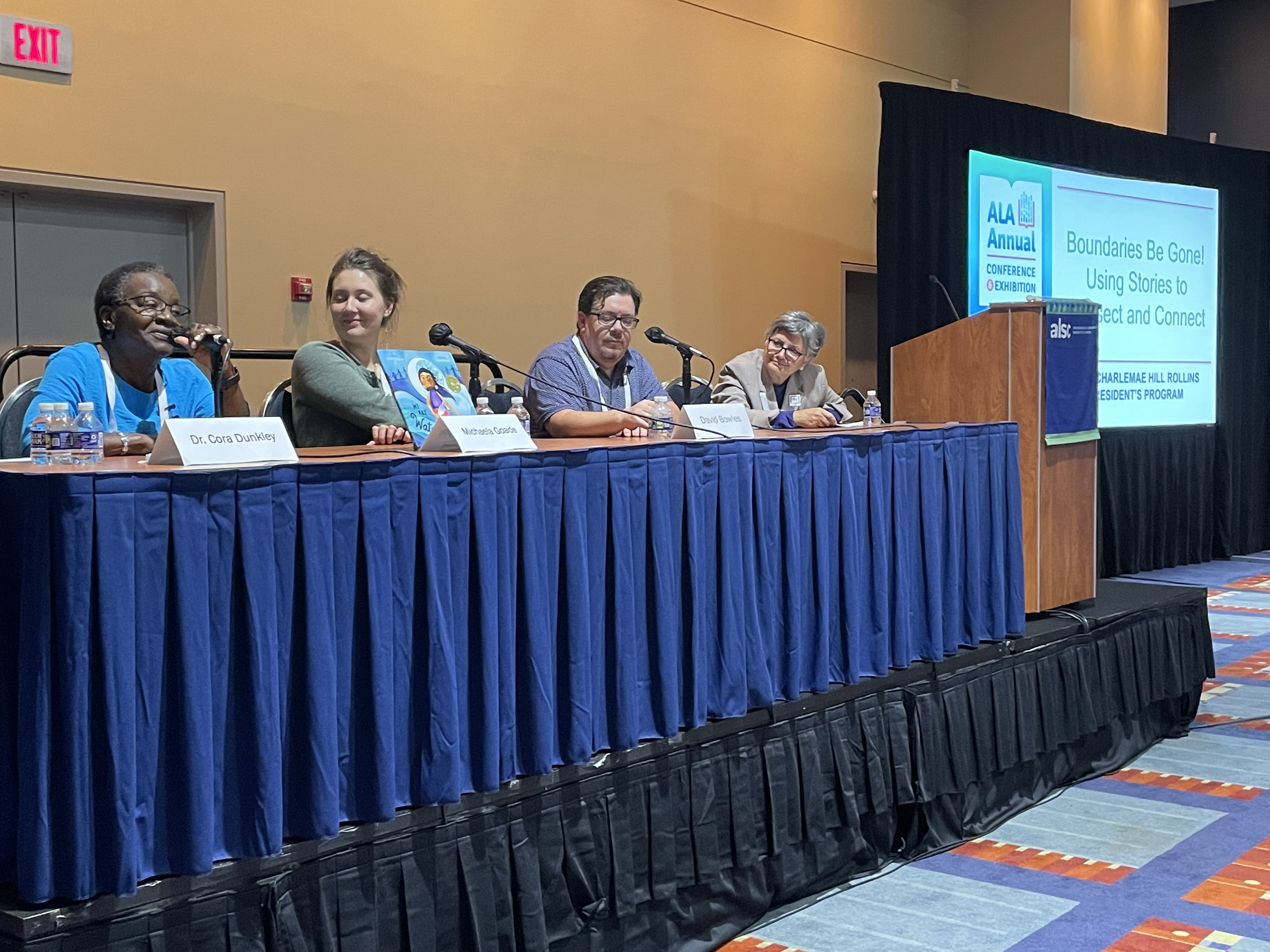
Panelist Dr. Cora Dunkley speaking at Association for Library Service to Children 2022 President's Program, Lucia Gonzalez, President

At the beginning of the century The Congress on Professional Education recommended that the Association develop a set of Core Values.

In 2018, the ALA Council unanimously adopted a resolution acknowledging ALA's accountability for not participating in the fight against library segregation during the era of Jim Crow laws and honoring African American librarians who did fight, including Clara Stanton Jones, E. J. Josey, Albert P. Marshall, and Virginia Lacy. The day it was signed, ALA President Jim Neal read the resolution at an event where Joan Mattison Daniel of the Greenville Eight, Ethel Adolphe, Ibrahim Mumin, and Teri Moncure Mojgani shared their experiences participating in library protests and sit-ins during the 1960s. Two years later, ALA expanded its accountability to include the organization's history of "upholding unjust systems of racism and discrimination against Black, Indigenous, and People of Color (BIPOC) within the association and the profession" and further resolved "to build a more equitable association" moving forward.

In 2023 the Public Library Association of ALA published the Public Library Services for Strong Communities Report addressing the myriad ways libraries nationwide serve and sustain their communities. That same year, the Montana State Library Commission withdrew from the ALA, citing comments made by Emily Drabinski, who self-identified as a "Marxist lesbian".

The Digital Public Library Ecosystem was published by ALA in 2023. It is a comprehensive overview of the current state and operations of the relationships and roles of stakeholders including authors, agents, publishers, distributors, the library community, governments, and trade organizations.

In 2024, in response to proposed Georgia legislation that would prohibit public expenditures on the ALA, the ALA responded that the legislation "is based on false narratives", and the ALA "does not promote any 'ideology'".

Also in 2024, Association received the Toni Morrison Achievement Award from the National Book Critics Circle.

Also in 2024, the Library History Round Table published the "Bibliography of Library History" database containing over 7,000 entries for books, articles, and theses in library history and related fields published from 1990 to 2022.

Standards for Library Services for the Incarcerated or Detained was published in 2024.

In 2026 the 150th anniversary of the association was celebrated.

On August 31, 2026 the Young Adult Library Services Association was dissolved. It was reunified with the Association for Library Service to Children on September 1, 2026.

=== Archives ===
The ALA Archives, including historical documents, non-current records, and digital records, are held at the University of Illinois Urbana-Champaign archives. The establishment of the archives and the roles of David Horace Clift, Robert Wedgeworth, Beta Phi Mu, and the Library History Round Table has been documented by the first archivist, Maynard Britchford.

Additionally, the American Library Association Institutional Repository (ALAIR) provides digital access to the publications and intellectual work of the Association.

== Membership ==
ALA membership is open to any person or organization, though most of its members are libraries or librarians. Most members live and work in the United States, with international members comprising 3.5% of total membership.

== Governing structure ==
The ALA is governed by an elected council and an executive board. Policies and programs are administered by committees and round tables. One of the organization's most visible tasks is overseen by the Office for Accreditation, which formally reviews and authorizes American and Canadian academic institutions that offer degree programs in library and information science.

=== President and executive directors ===
ALA's president for the 2025-2026 term is Sam Helmick.

The executive director of the American Library Association delegates authority within ALA headquarters to ALA's department heads, who, in carrying out their assigned duties, are called upon to use ALA's name, and, in that name, to commit the Association to programs, activities, and binding agreements.

List of Executive Directors of the American Library Association

Name	Tenure
Daniel J. Montgomery (assuming office November 2025)	2025-
Leslie Burger (interim)	2023–2025
Tracie D. Hall	2020–2023
Mary W. Ghikas	2017–2020
Keith Michael Fiels	2002–2017
William R. Gordon	1998–2002
Mary W. Ghikas	1997–1998
Elizabeth Martinez	1994–1997
Peggy Sullivan	1992–1994
Linda F. Crismond First woman executive director.	1989–1992
Thomas J. Galvin	1985–1989
Robert Wedgeworth	1972–1985
David Horace Clift (*Title changed to executive director as of November 1958)	1951–1972
John MacKenzie Cory	1948–1951
Harold F. Brigham (interim)	1948
Carl Milam	1920–1948

Secretaries of the Association prior to Carl Milam were George Burwell Utley (1911–20); Chalmers Hadley (1909–11); Edward C. Hovey (1905–7); James Ingersoll Wyer (1902–09); Frederick Winthrop Faxon (1900–02); Henry James Carr (1898–1900); Melvil Dewey (1897–98); Rutherford Platt Hayes (1896–97); Henry Livingston Elmendorf (1895–96); Frank Pierce Hill (1891–95); Mary Salome Cutler (1891); William E. Parker (1890–91) and Melvil Dewey (1879–90).

=== Activities ===
The official purpose of the association is "to promote library service and librarianship." Members may join one or more of eight membership divisions that deal with specialized topics such as academic, school, or public libraries, technical or reference services, and library administration. Members may also join any of the nineteen round tables that are grouped around more specific interests and issues than the broader set of ALA divisions.

==== Divisions ====
- American Association of School Librarians (AASL).
- Association for Library Service to Children (ALSC).
- Association of College and Research Libraries (ACRL).
- Core: Leadership, Infrastructure, Futures. Advances the profession of librarians and information providers in leadership and management, collections and technical services, and technology roles. Formed from former ALA divisions: Association for Library Collections and Technical Services (ALCTS), Library and Information Technology Association (LITA), and Library Leadership and Management Association (LLAMA).
- Public Library Association (PLA).
- Reference and User Services Association (RUSA). Serves libraries in reference, user services, adult readers' advisory and collection development as well as resource sharing, genealogy and archives, and reference technology. Selects notable books for an annual list.
- United for Libraries. Supports those who govern, promote, advocate, and fundraise for all types of libraries.
- Young Adult Library Services Association (YALSA) existed from 1957-2026. Re-unified with ALSC on September 1, 2026.

==== Offices ====
- ALA Editions (book publishing)
- Office for Accreditation
- Office for Diversity, Literacy and Outreach Services
- Office for Intellectual Freedom
- Public Programs Office
- Public Policy and Advocacy (est. in 1945)

==== Round Tables ====
List of ALA Round Tables
- Coretta Scott King Book Award Round Table
- Ethnic & Multicultural Information Exchange RT (EMIERT)-committed to Multicultural education
- Exhibits Round Table (ERT)
- Film and Media Round Table (FMRT), from 1988 to 2018 was the Video Round Table.
- Games and Gaming (GAMERT)
- Government Documents (GODORT)
- Graphic Novels & Comics Round Table (GN&CRT)
- Intellectual Freedom Round Table (IFRT)
- International Relations (IRRT)
- Learning RT (LearnRT)
- Library History Round Table (LHRT) "Bibliography of Library History" database containing over 7,000 entries.
- Library Instruction Round Table
- Library Research
- Library Support Staff Interests Round Table
- Map and Geospatial Information
- New Members Round Table
- Rainbow Round Table
- Retired Members Round Table
- Social Responsibilities Round Table – est. 1969.

Task forces:

- *Feminist Task Force
  - Hunger, Homelessness, and Poverty Task Force
  - International Responsibilities Task Force
  - Martin Luther King Jr. Holiday Task Force
  - The Rainbow Project Task Force
  - Task Force on the Environment
- Staff Organization
- Sustainability
- Round Table Coordinating Assembly

==== Committees ====
The Committee on Literacy develops and recommends the association's policies related to the promotion of multiple literacies.

The Chapter Relations Committee develops and recognizes chapters as integral components of ALA, encourages discussion, activities and programs that support the mutual interests of ALA and the chapters.

== National outreach ==
National Library Week is just one of the many forms of outreach that the association does on a national level.

The ALA is affiliated with regional, state, and student chapters across the country. The association organizes conferences, participates in library standards development, and publishes books and periodicals. The ALA publishes the journals American Libraries, Booklist and Choice.

The Graphics Program creates and distributes products that promote libraries, literacy and reading. Along with other organizations, it sponsors the annual Banned Books Week the last week of September. The Young Adult Library Services Association also sponsors Teen Read Week, the third week of each October, and Teen Tech Week, the second week of each March. National Library Week, the second week of each April, is a national observance sponsored by the ALA since 1958. Libraries across the country celebrate library resources, library champions and promote public outreach.

The ALA's Office for Library Advocacy has an initiative called I Love Libraries, also known as ilovelibraries, which attempts to "spread the world about the value of today's libraries," promotes value of librarians and libraries, explains key library issues, and "urges readers to support and take action for their libraries."

In addition, the ALA helps to promote diversity in the library profession with various outreach activities, including the Spectrum Scholarship program, which awards academic scholarships to minority library students each year. The ALA provides many scholarships (over $300,000 annually), a list of which can be found on their website.

== Awards ==
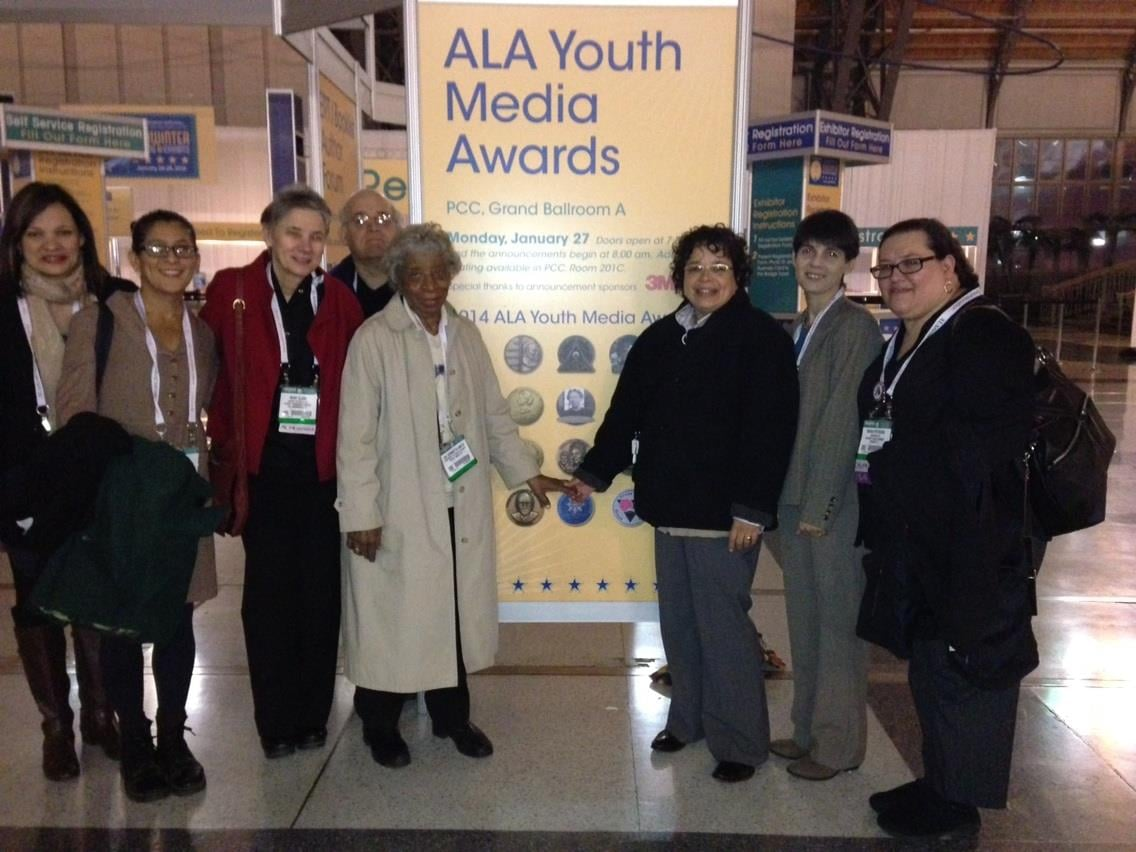
ALA Youth Media Awards in January 2014; Pura Belpré Committee with Henrietta M. Smith

The American Library Association confers many professional recognition awards. Association-wide awards include American Library Association Honorary Membership, the Joseph W. Lippincott Award, the ALA Medal of Excellence and American Library Association Equality Award.

The ALA annually confers numerous book and media awards, many through its children's and young adult divisions.

The Association of Library Service to Children (ALSC) administers:

- Caldecott Medal
- Newbery Medal
- Batchelder Award
- Belpré Awards
- Geisel Award
- Sibert Medal

The Odyssey Award for best audiobook (joint with YALSA), and the (U.S.) Carnegie Medal and for best video. There are also two ALSC lifetime recognitions, the Children's Literature Legacy Award and the Arbuthnot Lecture.

The Coretta Scott King Award honorees are awarded by the Coretta Scott King Book Awards Round Table.

The young-adult division, YALSA, administers the Margaret Edwards Award for significant and lasting contribution to YA literature, a lifetime recognition of one author annually, and annual awards that recognize particular works: the Michael L. Printz Award for a YA book judged on literary merit alone, the William C. Morris Award for an author's first YA book, the new "YALSA Award for Excellence in Nonfiction for Young Adults," and the "Alex Award" list of ten adult books having special appeal for teens. Jointly with the children's division ALSC there is the Odyssey Award for excellence in audiobook production.

The award for YA nonfiction was inaugurated in 2012, defined by ages 12 to 18 and publication year November 2010 to October 2011. The first winner was The Notorious Benedict Arnold: A True Story of Adventure, Heroism & Treachery by Steve Sheinkin (Roaring Brook Press, November 2010) and four other finalists were named.

The Reference and User Services Association awards include annual lists of "Notable" and "Best" books and other media. The Reference and User Services Association awards also include the Andrew Carnegie Medals for Excellence in Fiction and Nonfiction, Dartmouth Medal, Sophie Brody Award and Schneider Book Awards.

The Library History Round Table awards the Justin Winsor Prize for the best library history essay.

The Rainbow RoundTable annually honors authors with the Stonewall Book Award.

The annual awards roster also includes the John Cotton Dana Award for excellence in library public relations, and the "I Love My Librarian" award in concert with the philanthropic foundation Carnegie Corporation of New York and the New York Public Library.

In 2000, the Office for Literacy and Outreach Services (OLOS) launched the Jean E. Coleman Library Outreach Lecture in tribute to the work of the first OLOS director, Jean E. Coleman. Barbara J. Ford gave the inaugural lecture, "Libraries, Literacy, Outreach and the Digital Divide."

Since 2006, the ALA has selected a class of Emerging Leaders, typically comprising about 100 librarians and library school students. This minor distinction is a form of organizational outreach to new librarians. The Emerging Leaders are allocated to project groups tasked with developing solutions to specified problems within ALA divisions. The class meets at the ALA Midwinter and Annual Meetings, commonly January and June. Project teams may present posters of their completed projects at the Annual.

== Conferences ==
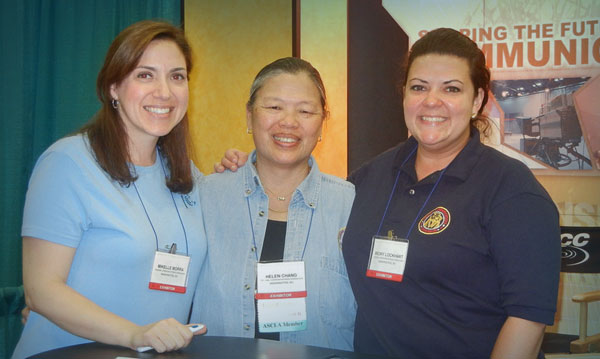
The American Library Association Conference in June 2011

The ALA and its divisions hold numerous conferences throughout the year. The two largest conferences are the annual conference and the midwinter meeting, now called LibLearnX. The latter is typically held in January and focuses on innovative session design concepts, while the annual conference is typically held in June and focuses on programs, exhibits, and presentations. The ALA annual conference is notable for being one of the largest professional conferences in existence, typically drawing over 25,000 attendees.

In 2020, Wanda Kay Brown was the first president in 75 years under whom the Annual Conference, scheduled for Chicago in June 2020, was cancelled because of the COVID-19 pandemic. In a press release about cancellation of the conference, Brown stated: "ALA's priority is the health and safety of the library community, including our members, staff, supporters, vendors and volunteers."

== Political positions ==
The ALA advocates positions on United States political issues that it believes are related to libraries and librarianship. For court cases that touch on issues about which the organization holds positions, the ALA often files amici curiae briefs, voluntarily offering information on some aspect of the case to assist the court in deciding a matter before it. The ALA has a Public Policy and Advocacy office in Washington, D.C., that lobbies Congress on issues relating to libraries, information and communication. It also provides materials to libraries that may include information on how to apply for grants, how to comply with the law, and how to oppose a law.

=== Intellectual freedom ===
The primary documented expressions of the ALA's intellectual freedom principles are the Freedom to Read Statement and the Library Bill of Rights; the Library Bill of Rights urges libraries to "challenge censorship in the fulfillment of their responsibility to provide information and enlightenment." The ALA Code of Ethics also calls on librarians to "uphold the principles of intellectual freedom and resist all efforts to censor library resources."

The ALA maintains an Office for Intellectual Freedom (OIF), which is charged with "implementing ALA policies concerning the concept of intellectual freedom," defined as "the right of every individual to both seek and receive information from all points of view without restriction. It provides for free access to all expressions of ideas through which any and all sides of a question, cause or movement may be explored." Its goal is "to educate librarians and the general public about the nature and importance of intellectual freedom in libraries." The OIF compiles lists of challenged books as reported in the media and submitted to them by librarians across the country.

The first director, Judith Krug, headed the office for four decades, until her death in April 2009.

In 1950, the Intellectual Freedom Committee, the forerunner of the OIF, investigated the termination of Ruth W. Brown as librarian of the Bartlesville Public Library, a position she held in the Oklahoma town for 30 years. Brown's termination was based on the false allegation that she was a communist and that she had as part of the library's serials collection two left wing publications, The New Republic and The Nation. The ALA support for her and the subsequent legal case was the first such investigation undertaken by the ALA or one of its state chapters.

In 1999, radio personality Laura Schlessinger campaigned publicly against the ALA's intellectual freedom policy, specifically in regard to the ALA's refusal to remove a link on its web site to a specific sex-education site for teens. Sharon Priestly said, however, that Schlessinger "distorted and misrepresented the ALA stand to make it sound like the ALA was saying porno for 'children' is O.K."

In 2002, the ALA filed suit with library users and the ACLU against the United States Children's Internet Protection Act (CIPA), which required libraries receiving federal E-rate discounts for Internet access to install a "technology protection measure" to prevent children from accessing "visual depictions that are obscene, child pornography, or harmful to minors." At trial, the federal district court struck down the law as unconstitutional. The government appealed this decision, and on June 23, 2003, the Supreme Court of the United States upheld the law as constitutional as a condition imposed on institutions in exchange for government funding. In upholding the law, the Supreme Court, adopting the interpretation urged by the U.S. Solicitor General at oral argument, made it clear that the constitutionality of CIPA would be upheld only "if, as the Government represents, a librarian will unblock filtered material or disable the Internet software filter without significant delay on an adult user's request."

In 2021, the ALA released a statement signed by its executive board and Boards of Directors of its eight divisions in response to "a dramatic uptick in book challenges and outright removal of books from libraries". The message condemned "a few organizations [which] have advanced the proposition that the voices of the marginalized have no place on library shelves ... falsely claiming that these works are subversive, immoral, or worse [and inducing] officials to abandon constitutional principles, ignore the rule of law, and disregard individual rights to promote government censorship of library collections". A spokesperson told ABC News that in her time working with reports of book challenges, she had "never seen such a widespread effort to remove books on racial and gender diversity".

=== Privacy ===
==== 1970s ====
The Federal Bureau of Investigation (FBI) attempted to use librarians as possible informants in the conspiracy case of the Harrisburg Seven in 1971. The Harrisburg Seven, a group of religious anti-war activists, were primarily accused of conspiring to kidnap National Security Advisor Henry Kissinger. The supposed leader of the group, Philip Berrigan, was serving time at the Lewisburg penitentiary. The FBI sought "to use library surveillance and librarian informants" at Bucknell University as evidence of the Harrisburg Seven's "characters and intentions." Boyd Douglas became one such informant for the FBI: he was a prisoner at the same penitentiary with a work-release position at the library. Boyd presented himself as an anti-war activist and offered to smuggle letters he collected while at work to Philip Berrigan at the prison.

The FBI also attempted to use Zoia Horn, a librarian at the Bucknell library, and interviewed other library workers. The FBI met with Horn in her home to debrief her, but Horn refused to answer their questions. She refused to testify, even after she was given immunity from self-incrimination. Horn stated, "To me it stands on: Freedom of thought" and for the government to practice "spying in homes, in libraries and universities inhibits and destroys this freedom." Zoia Horn was charged with contempt of the court and served 20 days in jail. She was "the first librarian who spent time in jail for a value of our profession" according to Judith Krug of the American Library Association's Office for Intellectual Freedom. Horn continued to fight for intellectual freedom in libraries and beyond. The Intellectual Freedom Committee of the California Library Association now awards the Zoia Horn Intellectual Freedom Award in honor of those who make contributions to intellectual freedom.

In the 1970s, United States Department of the Treasury agents also pressured public libraries across the country to "release circulation records recording the names and identifying information of people who checked out books on bomb making." The ALA believed this to be an "unconscionable and unconstitutional invasion of library patrons' privacy."

As a result of these two situations and many others, the ALA affirmed the confidential status of all records which held patron names in a Policy on the Confidentiality of Library Records. The ALA also released the ALA Statement on Professional Ethics in 1975 which advocated for the protection of the "confidential relationship" between a library user and a library.

==== 1980s ====
The FBI tried to use surveillance in library settings as part of its Library Awareness Program of the 1980s; it aimed to use librarians "as partners in surveillance." The program was known to the FBI as "The Development of Counterintelligence Among Librarians," indicating that the FBI believed that librarians might be supportive in its counterintelligence investigations. The FBI attempted to profile "Russian or Slavic-sounding last names" of library patrons to look for possible "national security threats." The FBI wanted libraries to help it trace "the reading habits of patrons with those names."

The ALA responded by writing to the FBI director. The Intellectual Freedom Committee also created "an advisory statement to warn libraries" of the Library Awareness Program, including ways to help librarians "avoid breaking their ethical obligations if faced with FBI surveillance."

==== USA PATRIOT Act ====
In 2003, the ALA passed a resolution opposing the USA PATRIOT Act, which called sections of the law "a present danger to the constitutional rights and privacy rights of library users." Since then, the ALA and its members have sought to change the law by working with members of Congress and educating their communities and the press about the law's potential to violate the privacy rights of library users. ALA has also participated as an amicus curiae in lawsuits filed by individuals challenging the constitutionality of the USA PATRIOT Act, including a lawsuit filed by four Connecticut librarians after the library consortium they managed was served with a national security letter seeking information about library users. After several months of litigation, the lawsuit was dismissed when the FBI decided to withdraw the National Security Letter. In 2007, the "Connecticut Four" were honored by the ALA with the Paul Howard Award for Courage for their challenge to the National Security Letter and gag order provision of the USA PATRIOT Act.

In 2006, the ALA sold humorous "radical militant librarian" buttons for librarians to wear in support of the ALA's stances on intellectual freedom, privacy, and civil liberties. Inspiration for the button's design came from documents obtained from the FBI by the Electronic Privacy Information Center (EPIC) through a Freedom of Information Act (FOIA) request. The request revealed a series of e-mails in which FBI agents complained about the "radical, militant librarians" while criticizing the reluctance of FBI management to use the secret warrants authorized under Section 215 of the USA PATRIOT Act.

=== Copyright ===
The ALA "supports efforts to amend the Digital Millennium Copyright Act (DMCA) and urges the courts to restore the balance in copyright law, ensure fair use and protect and extend the public domain." It supports changing copyright law to eliminate damages when using orphan works without permission; is wary of digital rights management; and, in ALA v. FCC, successfully sued the Federal Communications Commission to prevent regulation that would enforce next-generation digital televisions to contain rights-management hardware. It has joined the Information Access Alliance to promote open access to research. The Copyright Advisory Network of the association's Office for Information Technology Policy provides copyright resources to libraries and the communities they serve. The ALA is a member of the Library Copyright Alliance, along with the Association of Research Libraries and the Association of College and Research Libraries, which provides a unified voice for over 300,000 information professionals in the United States. Currently, the ALA supports bill H.R. 905, also known as the You Own Devices Act, stating "to foster the social and commercial evolution of the "Internet of Things" by codifying the right of the owner of a device containing 'essential software' intrinsic to its function to transfer [e.g. sell or lease] both the device and the software."

== Accredited programs in library and information studies ==
ALA-accredited programs can be found at schools in the U.S., Puerto Rico, and Canada. These programs offer degrees with names such as Master of Library Science, Master of Arts, Master of Librarianship, Master of Library and Information Studies, and Master of Science. To be accredited, the program must undergo an external review and meet the Standards for Accreditation of Master's Programs in Library and Information Studies.

== Affiliates ==
- American Association of Law Libraries
- American Indian Library Association
- Association for Information Science and Technology
- American Theological Library Association
- Art Libraries Society of North America (ARLIS/NA)
- Asian/Pacific American Librarians Association
- Association for Library and Information Science Education
- Association for Rural and Small Libraries
- Association of Bookmobile and Outreach Services
- Association of Jewish Libraries
- Association of Research Libraries
- Beta Phi Mu
- Black Caucus of the American Library Association
- Catholic Library Association
- Chinese American Librarians Association
- The Joint Council of Librarians of Color
- Latino Literacy Now
- Library and Information Association of New Zealand Aotearoa
- Medical Library Association
- Music Library Association
- National Storytelling Network
- Online Audiovisual Catalogers
- Patent and Trademark Resource Center Association
- Polish American Librarians Association
- ProLiteracy Worldwide
- REFORMA
- Seminar on the Acquisition of Latin American Library Materials
- Theatre Library Association

== See also ==
- American Indian Library Association and American Indian Youth Literature Awards
- ANSEL American National Standard for Extended Latin Alphabet Coded Character Set for Bibliographic Use
- Book Links, an ALA magazine that helps teachers, librarians, school library media specialists, and parents connect children with high-quality books
- Booklist, an ALA publication that provides critical reviews of books and audiovisual materials, geared toward libraries and booksellers
- Challenge (literature), an attempt to have books removed from a library
- Diversity in librarianship
- History of public library advocacy
- International Federation of Library Associations (IFLA)
- Library Bill of Rights
- Library Hall of Fame
- Library War Service
- Librarianship and human rights in the United States
- List of American Library Association accredited library schools
- List of libraries in the United States
- List of presidents of the American Library Association
- National Library Symbol
- Neal-Schuman Publishers, an imprint of the ALA
- Public library advocacy
- List of most commonly challenged books in the United States
