= People's Park =

People's Park may refer to:

== Brazil ==
- People's Park (São Paulo)
- People's Park (Campina Grande), in Campina Grande
- People's Park (Presidente Prudente), in Presidente Prudente

== China ==
People's Park (Chinese: 人民公园; pinyin: Rénmín Gōngyuán) is a common name for urban public parks in Chinese cities.

- People's Park (Chengdu), Sichuan
- People's Park (Guangzhou), Guangdong
- People's Park (Haikou), Hainan
- People's Park (Kashgar), Xinjiang
- People's Park (Nanchang), Jiangxi
- People's Park (Nanning), Guangxi
- People's Park (Shanghai), Shanghai
- People's Park (Shenzhen), Guangdong
- People's Park (Tianjin), Tianjin
- People's Park (Ürümqi), Xinjiang
- People's Park (Xining), Qinghai
- People's Park (Zhengzhou), He'nan
- People's Park (Zibo), Shandong
- Hua Luogeng Park (formerly People's Park), Jintan, Jiangsu
- Norbulingka (also as People's Park), Lhasa, Xizang
- Qingcheng Park (formerly People's Park), Hohhot, Nei Mongol

== Denmark ==
- Folkets Park, Copenhagen, People's Park, Copenhagen
- Folkeparken, Roskilde, People's Park, Roskilde

== Ireland ==
- People's Park, Dún Laoghaire, near Dublin
- People's Park, Limerick
- People's Park, Waterford

== Philippines ==
- People's Park (Davao City)
- Valenzuela People's Park
- People's Park in the Sky, Tagaytay

== United Kingdom ==
- Albert Park, Middlesbrough, England
- Mowbray Park, Sunderland, Tyne and Wear, England
- People's Park, Banbury, Oxfordshire, England
- People's Park, Halifax, West Yorkshire, England
- People's Park, Ballymena, Northern Ireland
- People's Park, Grimsby, Lincolnshire, England
- Saltwell Park, Gateshead, England
- Victoria Park, Tower Hamlets, London, known colloquially as the People's Park

== United States ==
- People's Park (Berkeley), California
- People's Park, Paterson, a section of Paterson, New Jersey

== Other countries ==
- People's Park (Budapest), Hungary
- People's Park, Chennai, India
- People's Square and Park, Yangon, Myanmar

== See also ==
- People's Park Complex, a commercial and residential building in Singapore
- People's Park Centre, a shopping centre in Singapore
- Volksgarten (disambiguation)
- People's Square (disambiguation)
- People's Park station (disambiguation)
