= Folkeparken =

Folkeparken may refer to:

Denmark

- Folkeparken, Græsted
- Folkeparken, Hjørring
- Folkeparken, Horsens
- Folkeparken, Roskilde

== See also ==
- Folkets Park, Copenhagen
- People's Park (disambiguation)
