= People's Square =

People's Square or Renmin Square (人民广场) is a common name used to refer to major public squares in a number of cities throughout the People's Republic of China.

People's Square includes but not limited to:

- People's Square (Dalian), Liaoning, China
- People's Square (Shanghai), Shanghai, China
- People's Square (Ürümqi), Xinjiang, China
- People's Square and Park, Yangon, Burma

Metro stations include:

- People's Square station (Hangzhou Metro), Zhejiang, China
- People's Square station (Shanghai Metro), Shanghai, China
- People's Square station (Shenyang Metro), Liaoning, China
- Wujiang Renmin Guangchang station, Suzhou, Jiangsu, China

== See also ==
- People's Square station (disambiguation)
- People's Park (disambiguation)
- Piazza del Popolo, Rome
- Piazza del Popolo, Cesena
