= Valenzuela People's Park =

Park in Valenzuela, Philippines

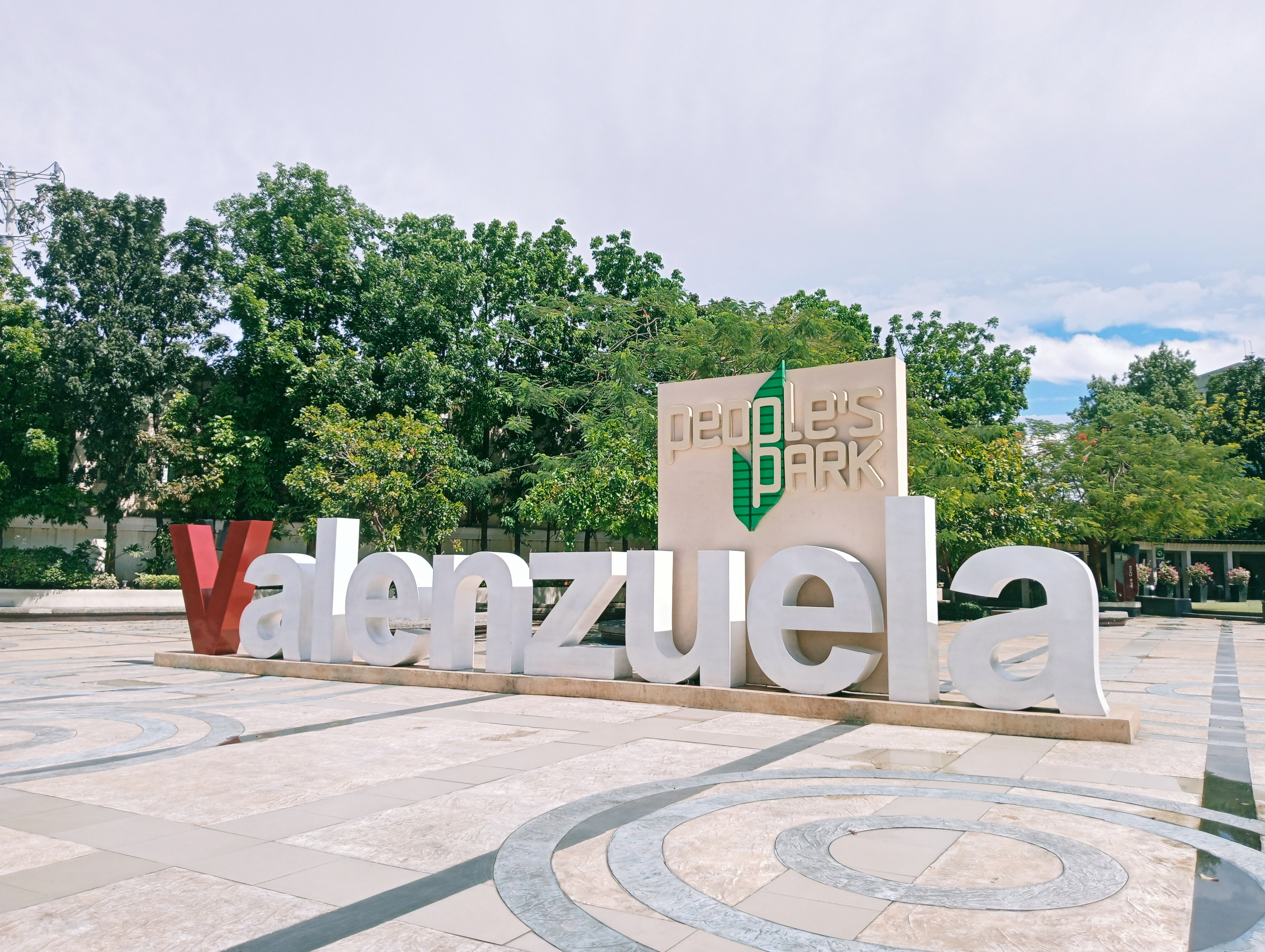
- Interactive map of Valenzuela People's Park
- Type: Urban park
- Motto: Experience Valenzuela
- Location: MacArthur Highway, Karuhatan, Valenzuela, Metro Manila, Philippines
- Coordinates: 14°41′30.0474″N 120°58′12.201″E
- Area: 1.5 ha (3.7 acres)
- Opened: February 14, 2015
- Public transit: 1 Valenzuela City Hall

The Valenzuela People's Park, officially the Valenzuela City People's Park and also known to local residents as simply People's Park or VCPP, is an urban community park located in the city of Valenzuela, Philippines. It is built beside the Valenzuela City Government Center and the Valenzuela Town Center. The construction of the 1.5-hectare (3.7-acre) park was started in 2014 and was formally opened to the public on February 14, 2015, during the 17th Valenzuela City Charter Day.

== Location ==
People's Park is bounded by two major roads of the city, MacArthur Highway and A. Pablo Street. The park itself is surrounded by various landmarks, government buildings, and shopping centers. The South Supermarket (in front of the People's Park) and the Valenzuela Town Center (between the People's Park and the New City Hall) are the nearest shopping destinations for park visitors. The park is also located beside the Valenzuela City Government Center.

== Gallery ==
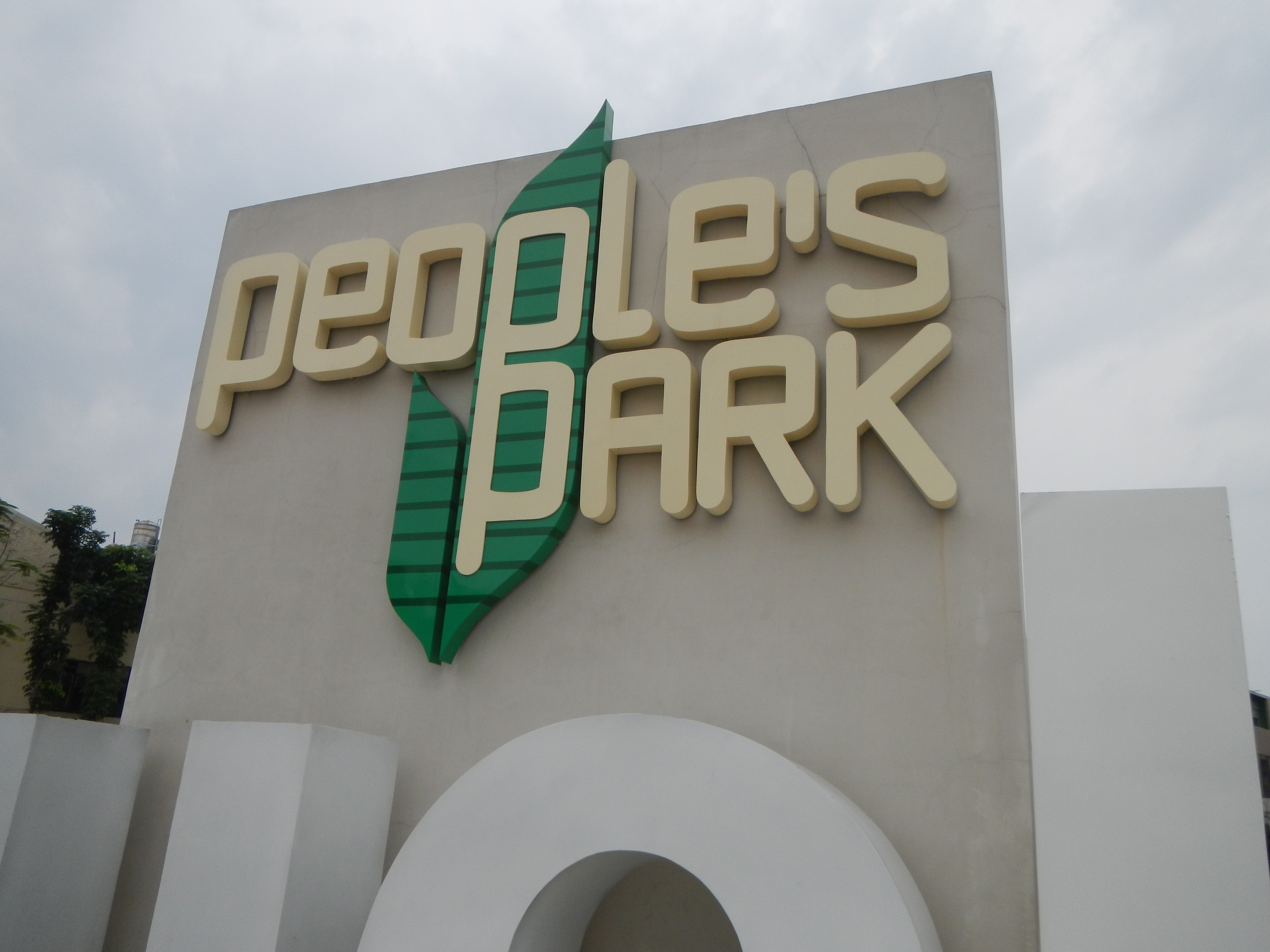
Entry marker for Valenzuela People's Park

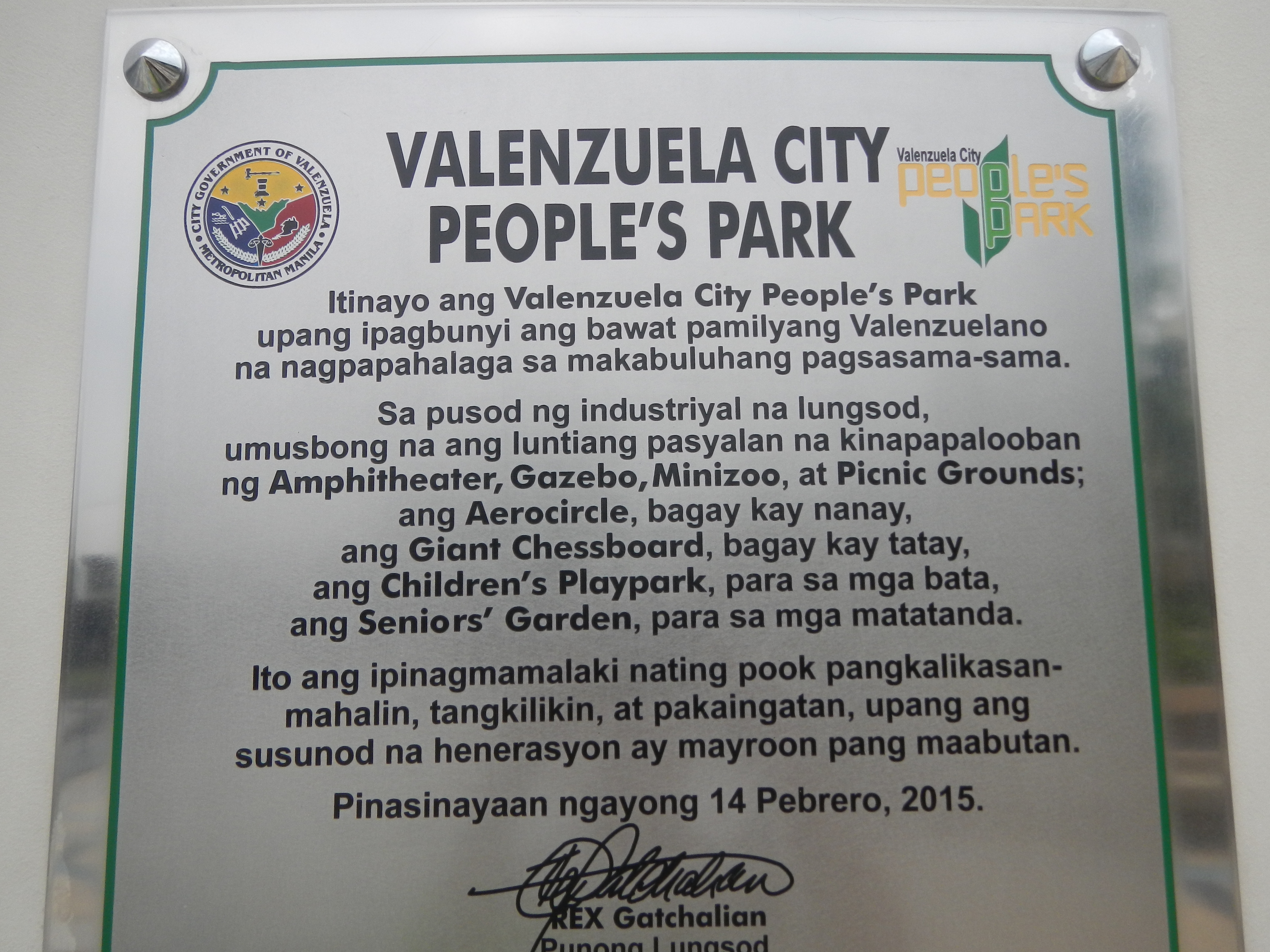
The Park's inauguration plate

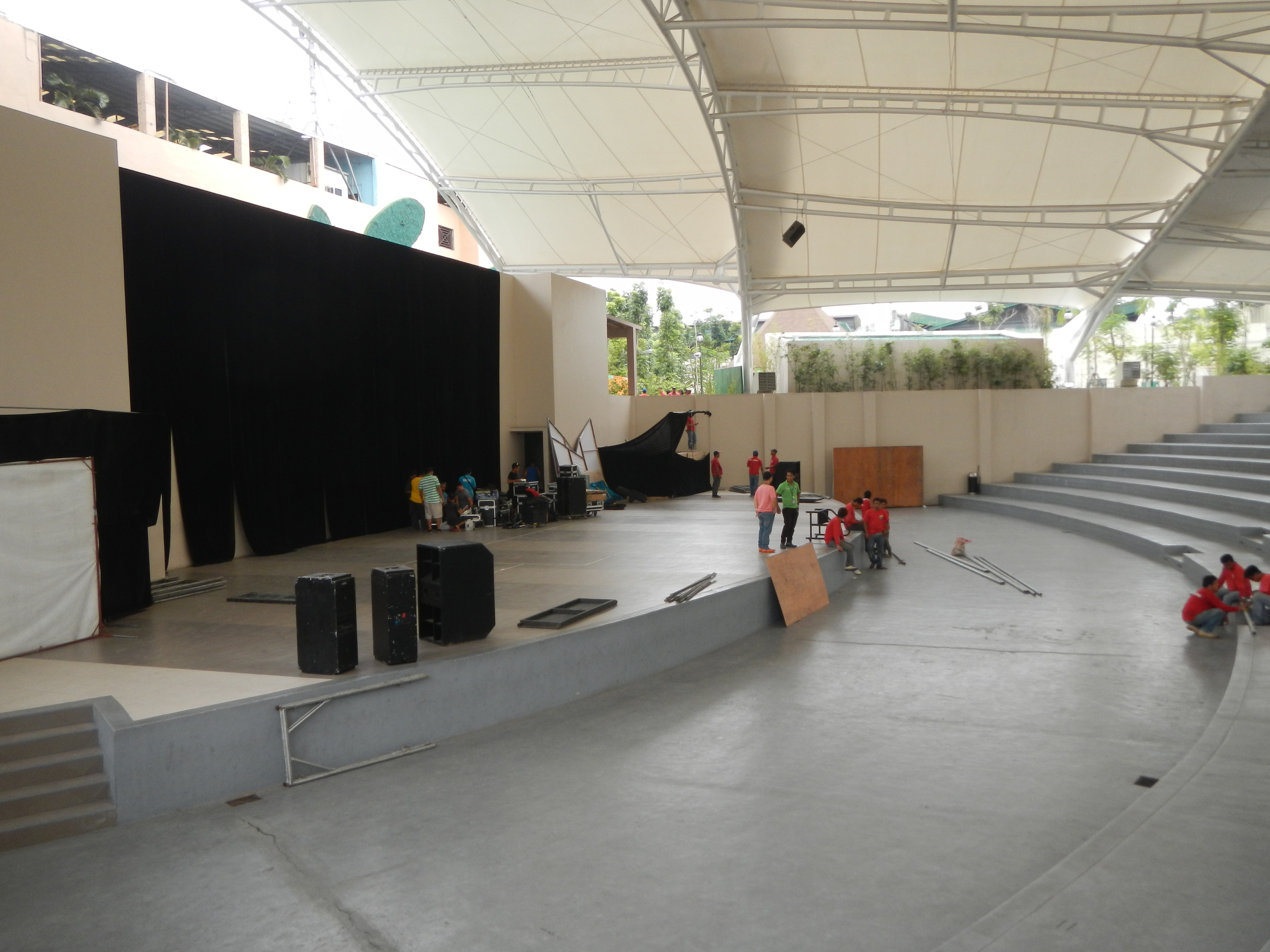
The Amphitheater

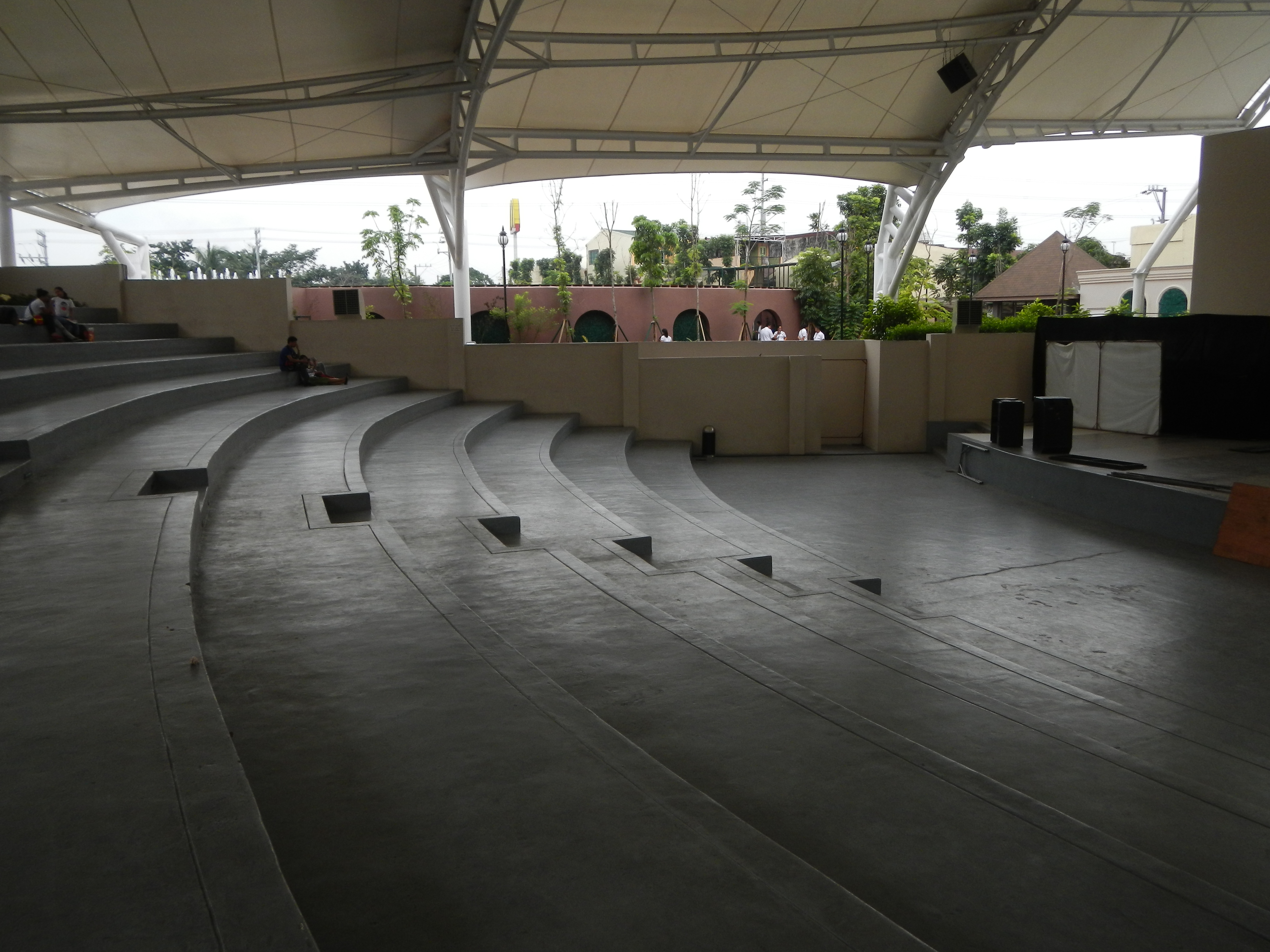
The Amphitheater

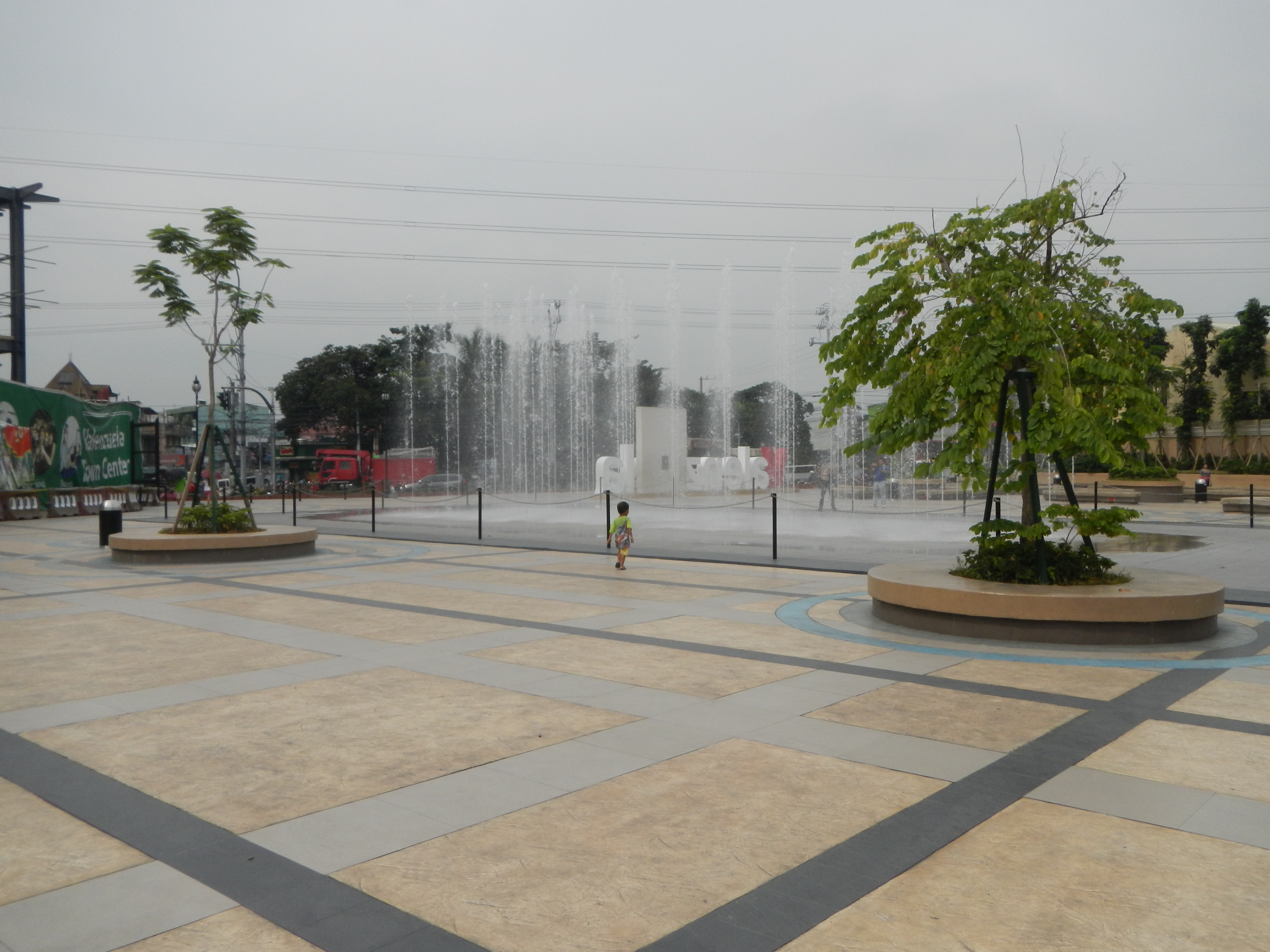
Interactive fountain

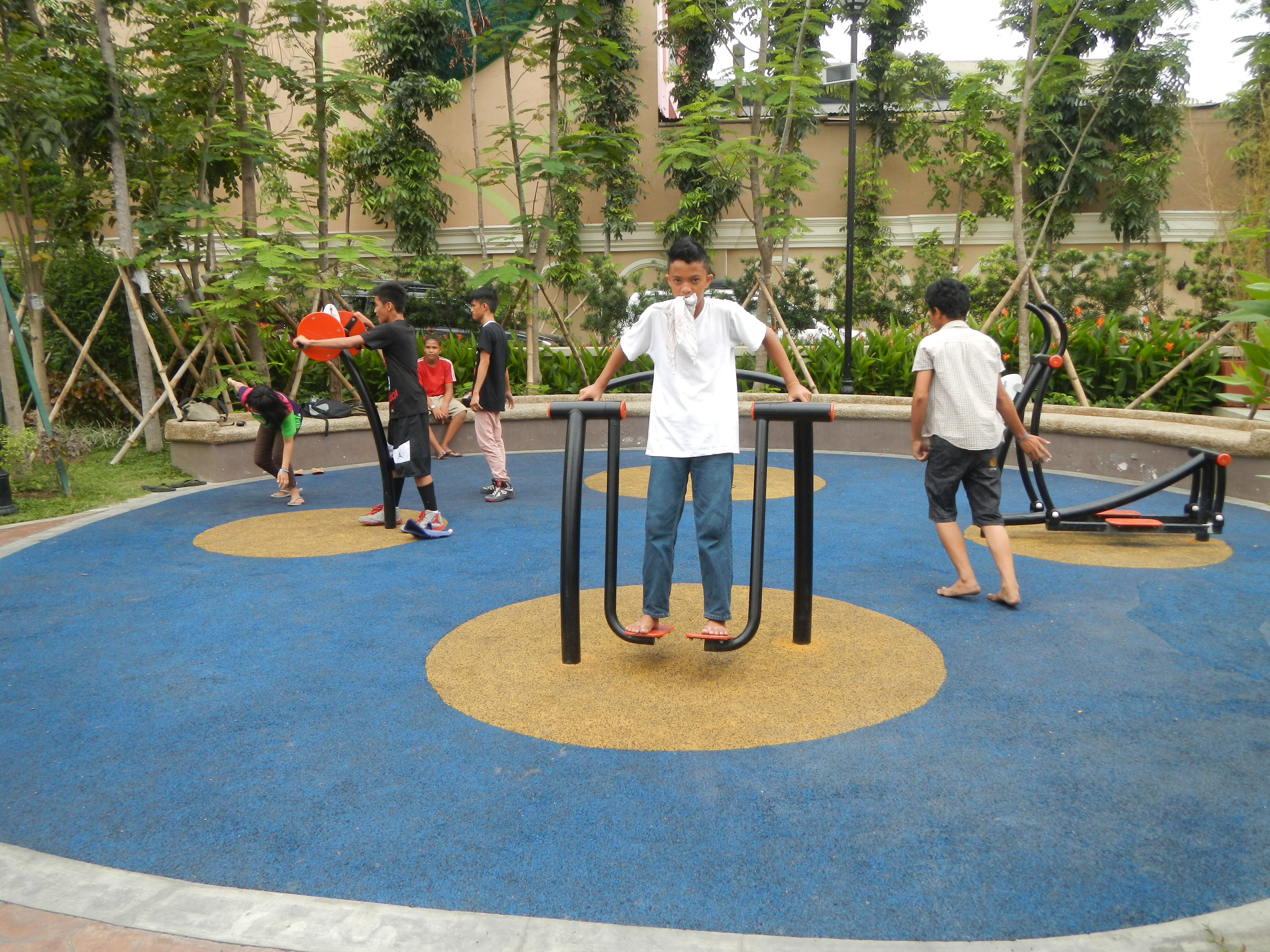
Children's play park

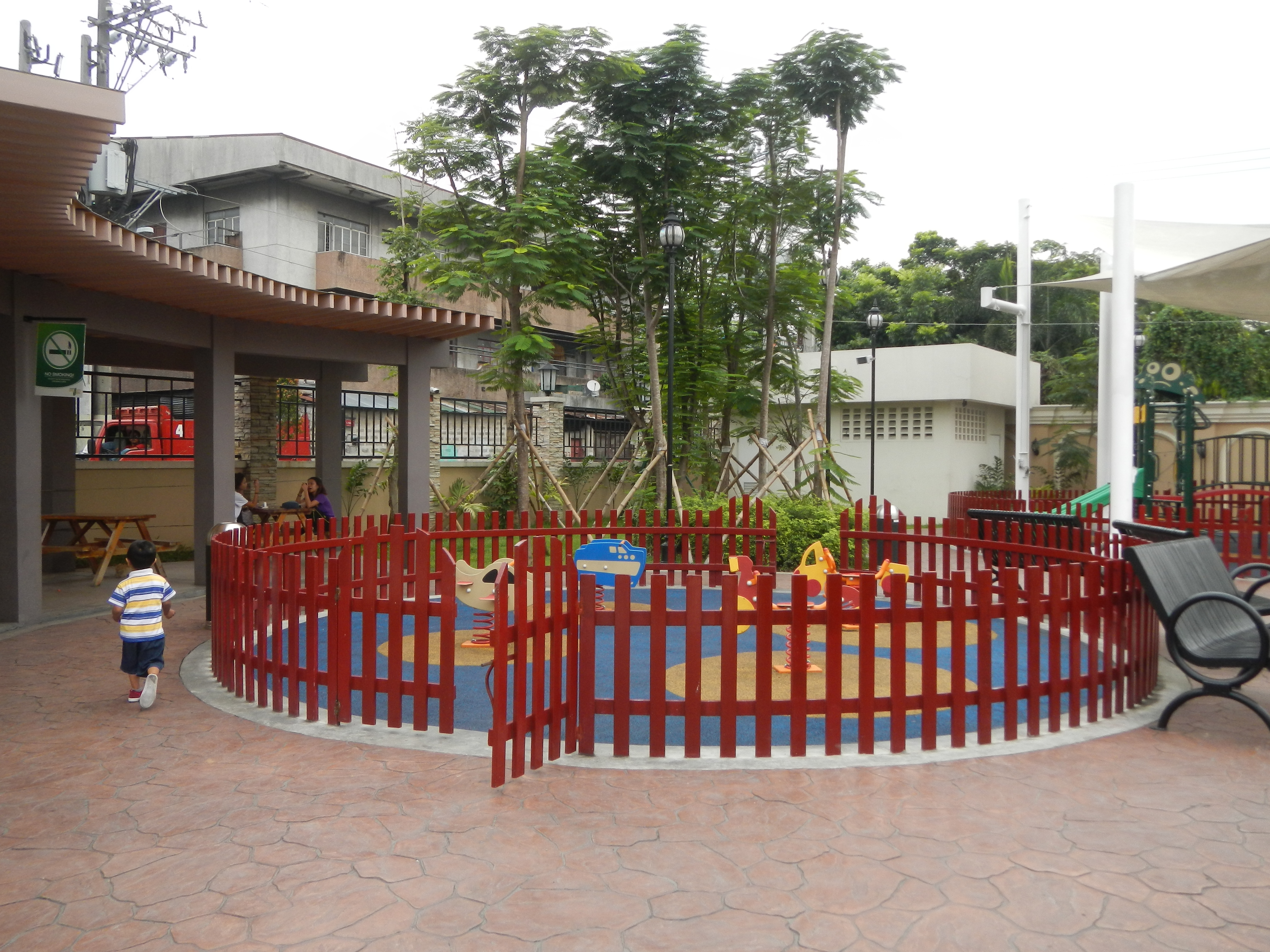
Children's play park

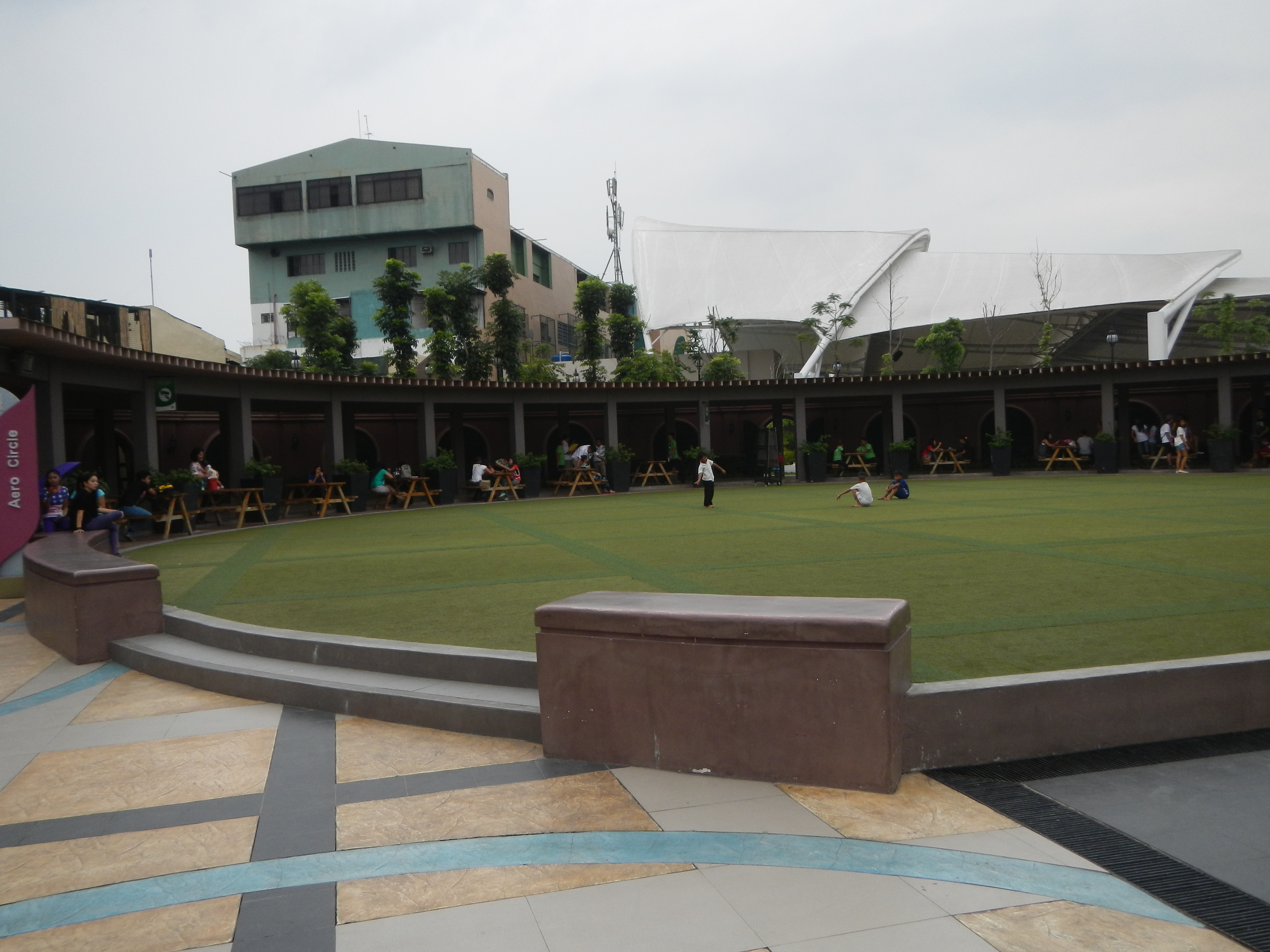
Aerocircle, center for zumba and other aerobic exercises

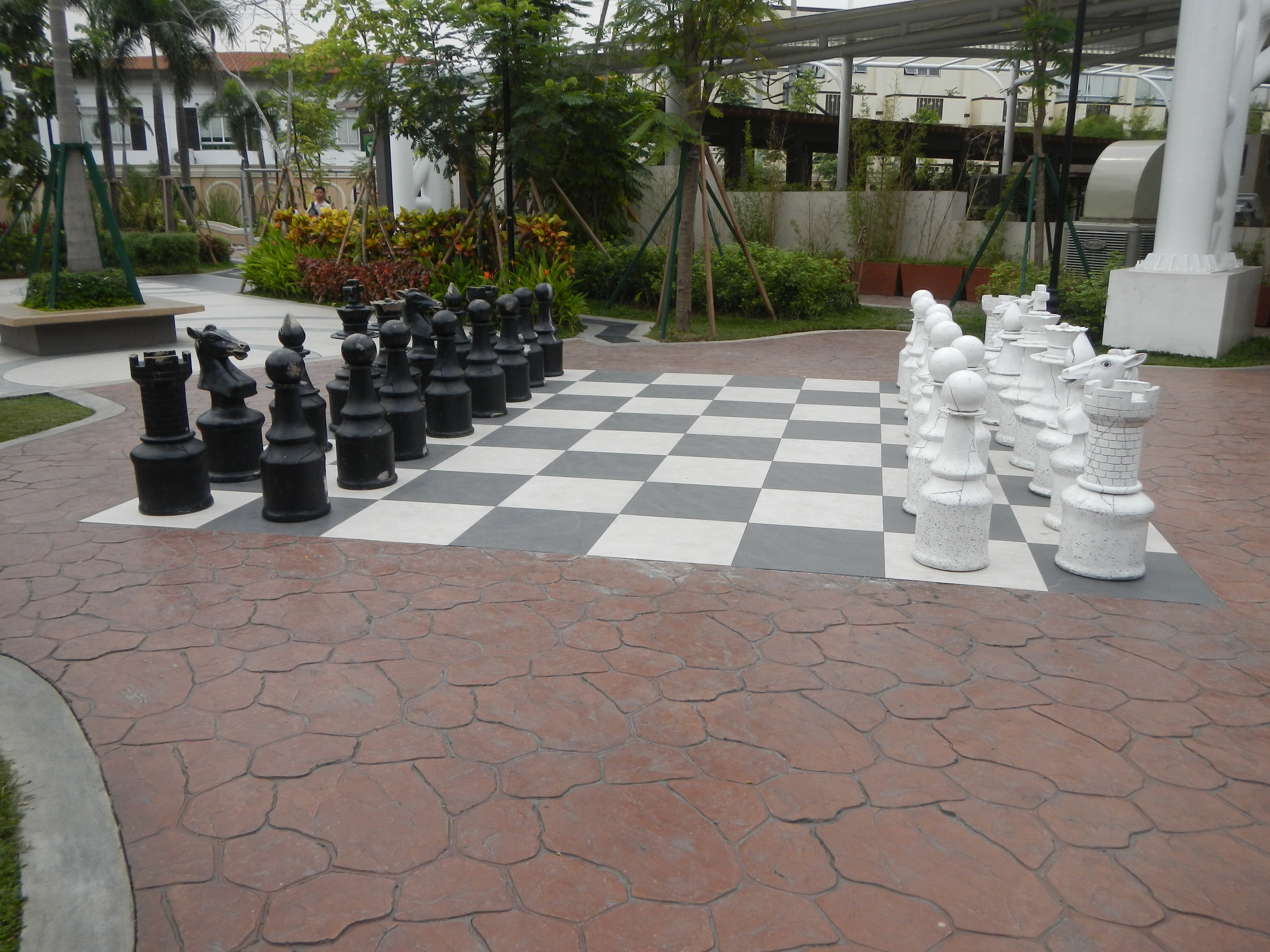
Giant chess board

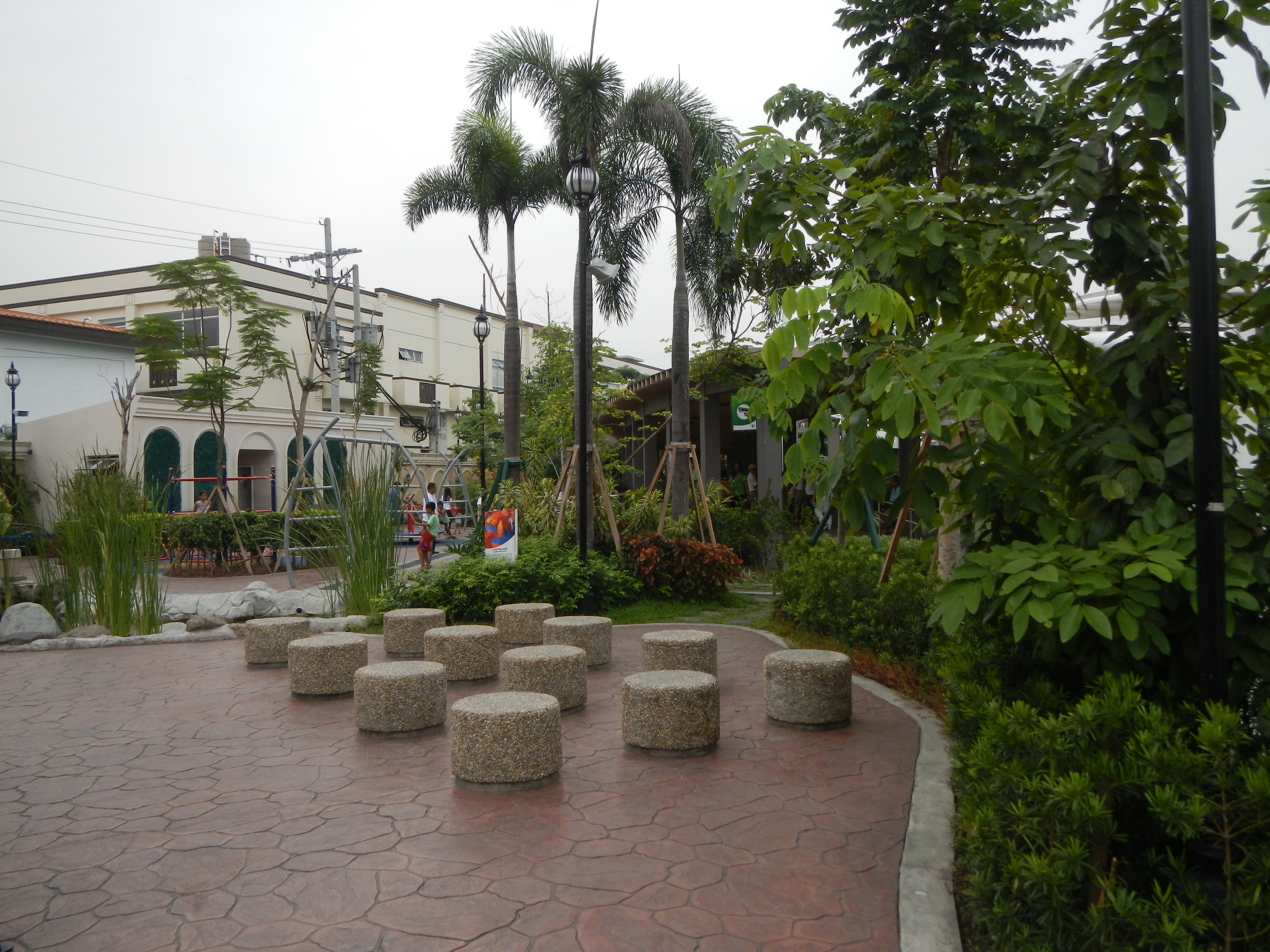
Senior's garden

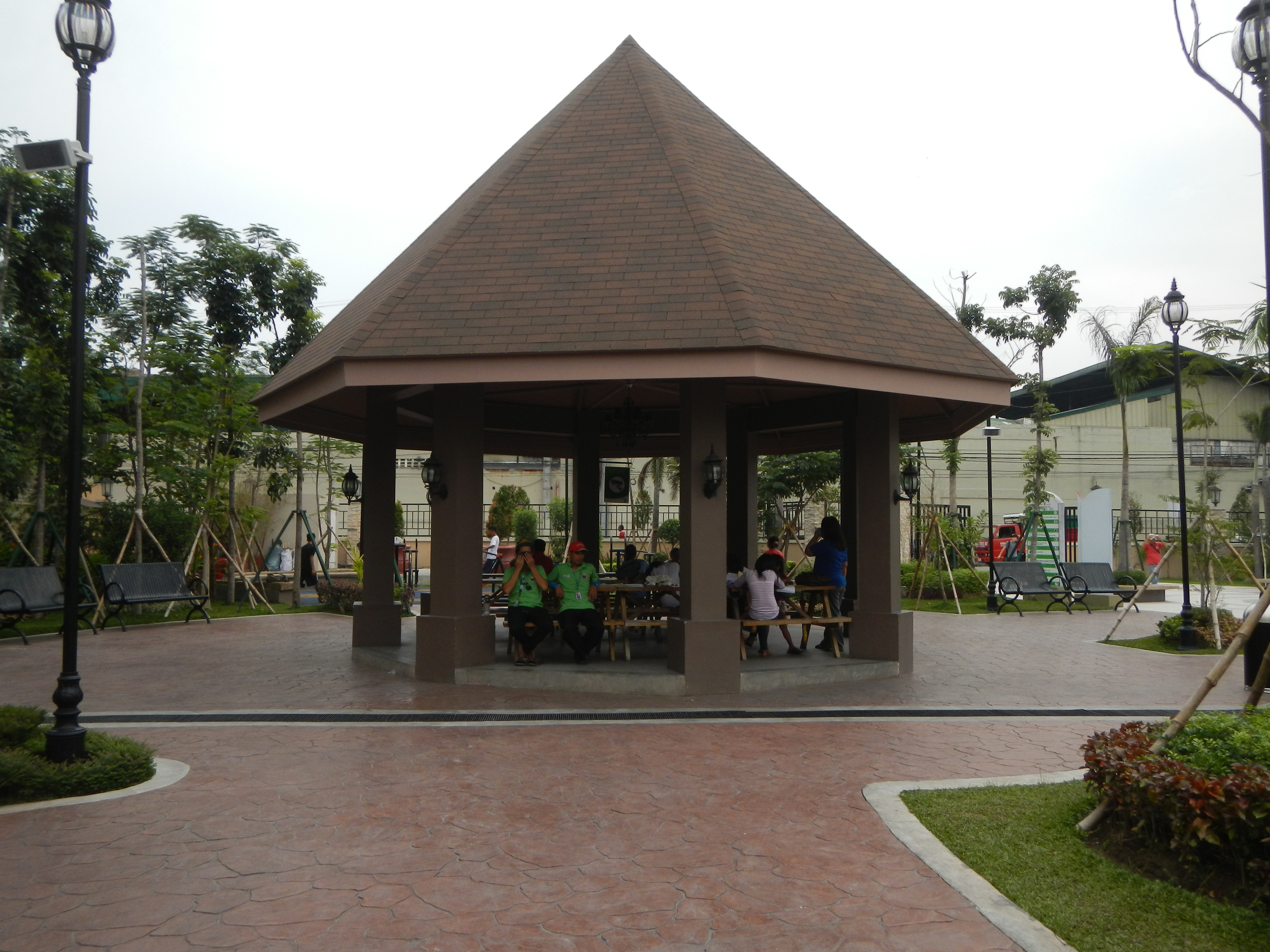
Gazebo and picnic grounds

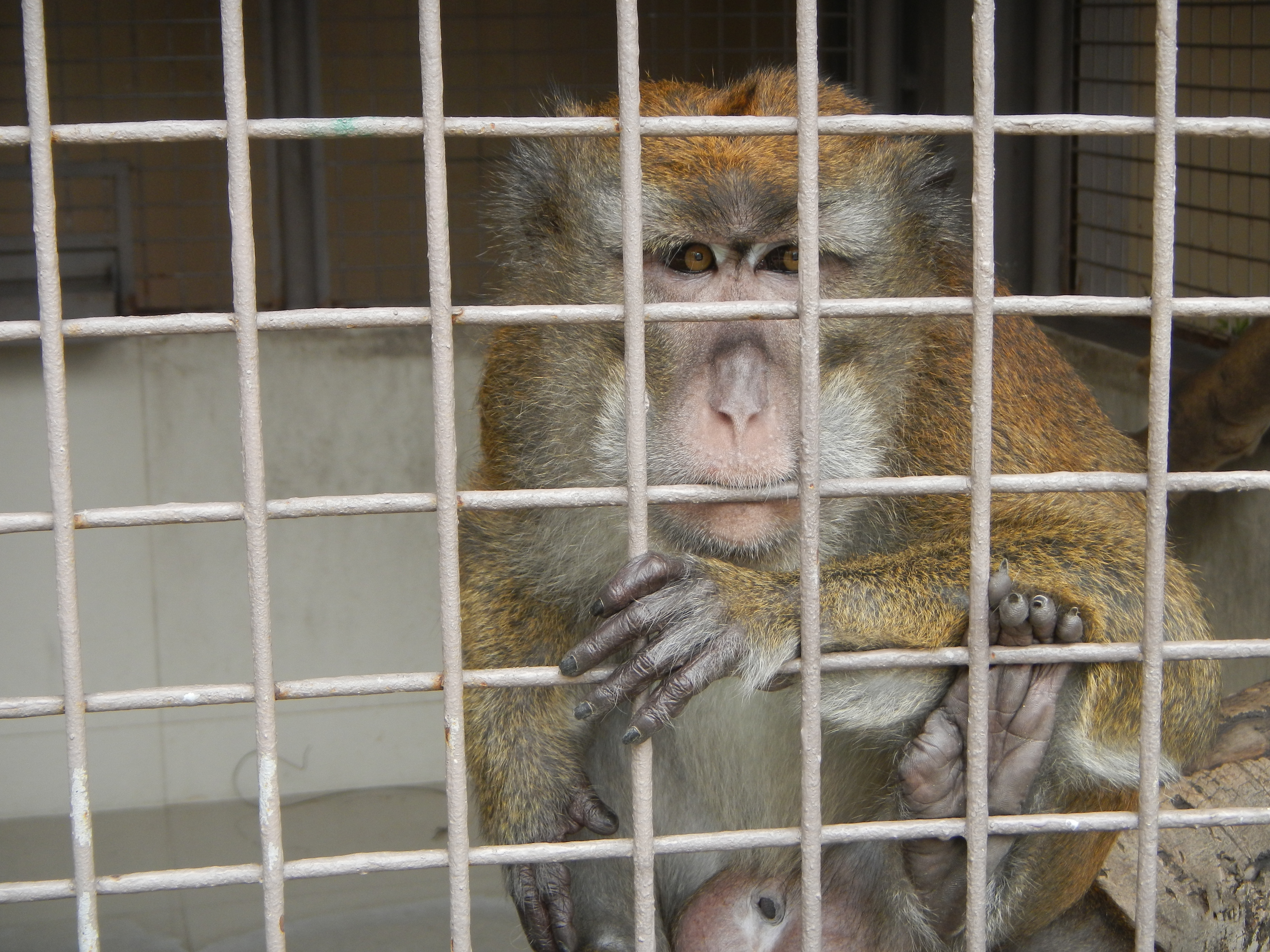
Crab-eating macaque in the minizoo

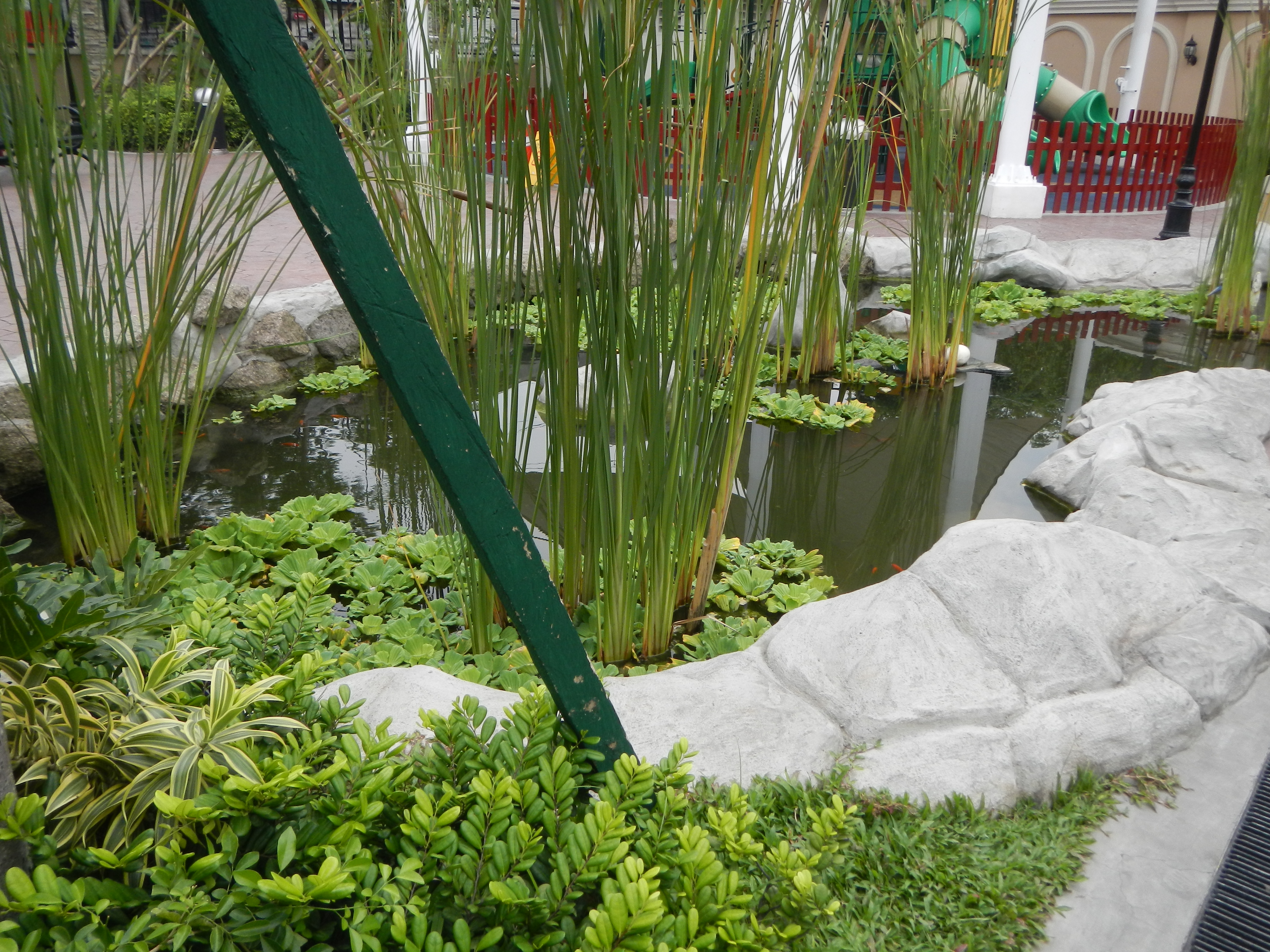
Fish ponds in the minizoo

== See also ==
- People's Park (disambiguation)
