= Volksgarten =

A Volksgarten (meaning "folks' park") is a public park founded by the nation in Germany or Austria, and may refer to:

- Volksgarten, Vienna in Austria
- Volksgarten, Salzburg in Austria
- Volksgarten, Munich in Germany
- Volksgarten, Düsseldorf in Germany
- Volksgarten, Cologne in Germany
- Volksgarten, Mönchengladbach in Germany
- Düsseldorf Volksgarten station in Germany
