= People's Park (Zhengzhou) =

Urban park in Zhengzhou, Henan, China

Coordinates: 34.7645138°N 113.6549377°E

People's Park (Chinese: 人民公园; pinyin: Rénmín Gōngyuán) is an urban public park located west of Erqi Road, in the center of Zhengzhou, capital of Henan province, China. It was built in 1951 and opened on 1 August 1952.

== Introduction ==
People's Park was the first park in the city of Zhengzhou. The west and south regions of the park were founded to commemorate people who died during the Republican Period. The temples and monuments stand at the corner of the park.The park contains the Hu Gong Shrine and Peng Gong Shrine. The Hu Gong Shrine was completed on October 10, 1925, to commemorate General Hu Jingyi. The Peng Gong Shrine commemorates Colonel Peng Xiangqian and his soldiers, who died defending Zhengzhou in 1922.

The park occupies about 30.14 hectares (74.48 acres), including 3.37 hectares (8.33 acres) of water and 25.41 hectares (62.79 acres) of plant life. The Hugong Temple, which is the landmark of the park, faces the south gate. Behind the temple are several artificial lakes. The most western lake is Qingnian lake, with two islands in the middle. On the eastern river bank is a boat route.

People's Park is also a theme park with various rides such as Roller Rush and Raving Mouse, a Ferris wheel, and a skating rink. Each year, the Festival Lantern exhibition is held in the park.

A lotus form fountain sits in the core of the park. Surrounding this fountain are sizeable formal gardens of Chinese roses and pines. The Spring Garden and Autumn Garden in the eastern region of the park are connected by a long road. The large greenhouses nearby house traditional Chinese flowers that bloom during Spring and Autumn.

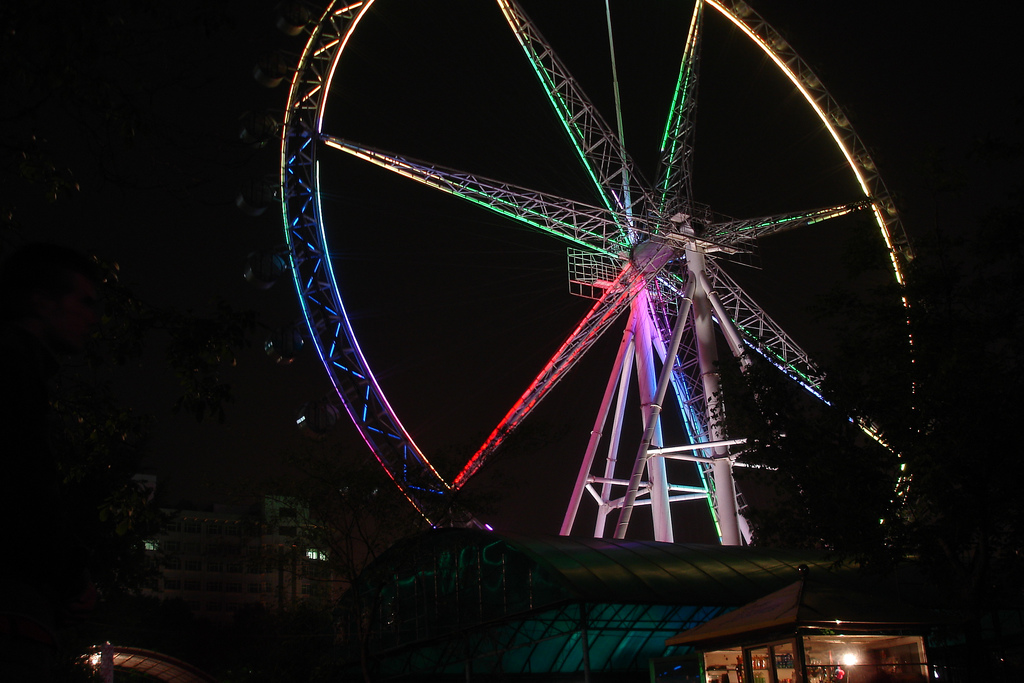
Ferris wheel at the Park
