= People's Park (Ürümqi) =

Urban public park in Ürümqi, Xinjiang, China

- Renmin Park
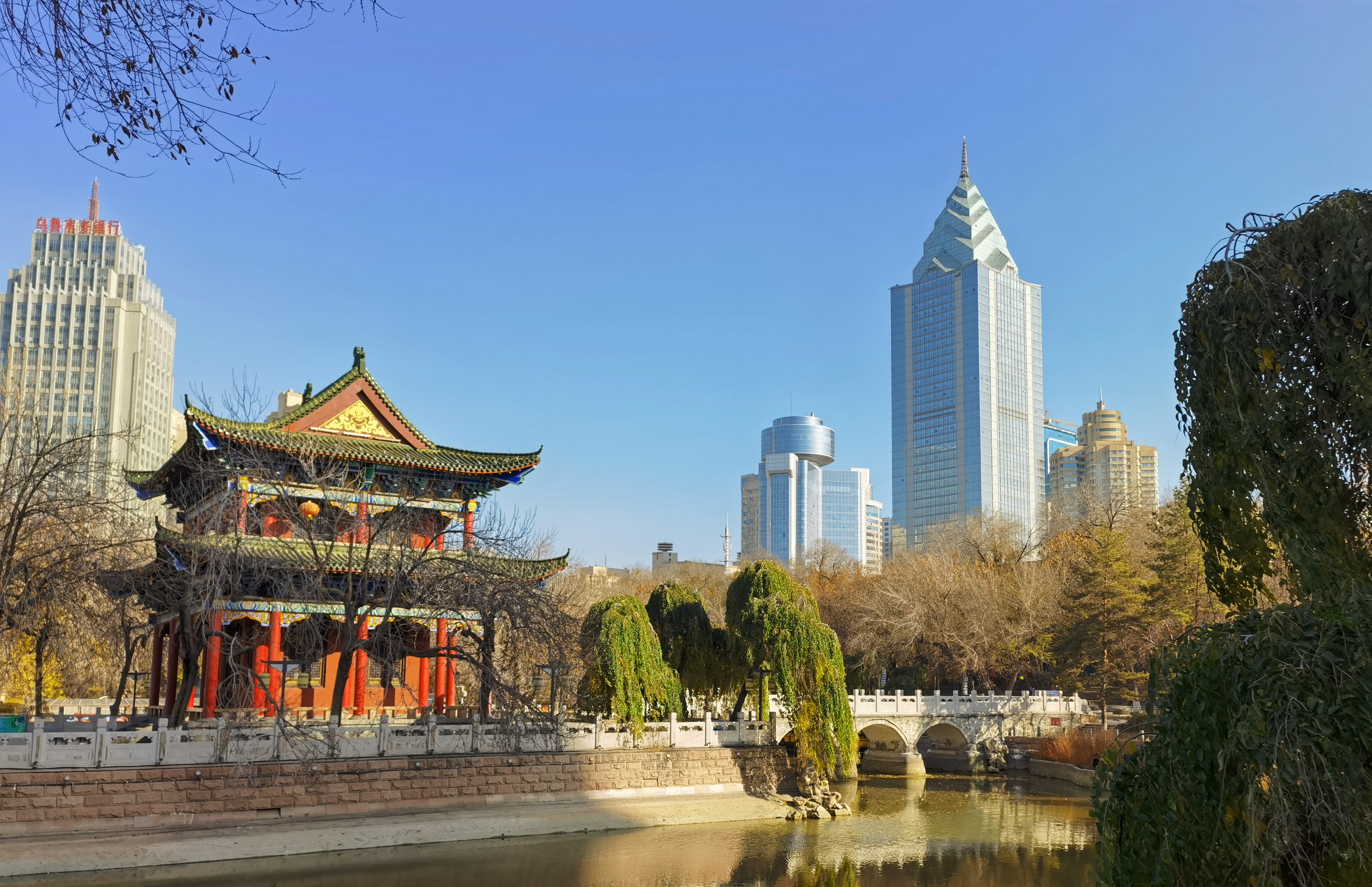
- Interactive map of People's Park
- Type: Urban park
- Location: Ürümqi, Xinjiang, China
- Coordinates: 43.79704°N 87.60154°E
- Created: 1912

People's Park (Chinese: 人民公园; pinyin: Rénmín Gōngyuán; Uyghur: ئۈرۈمچى خەلق باغچىسى, romanized: Ürümchi Xelq Baghchisi) is an urban public park in the center of Ürümqi, the capital of Xinjiang Uyghur Autonomous Region in northwestern China. People's Park and the nearby Hong Shan are very popular recreation areas for local residents. The Xinjiang Uyghur Museum was formerly located in the park.

== History ==
After the Qing dynasty conquest of the Dzungar Khanate in 1755, the Qianlong Emperor established the city of Dihua (Ürümqi) in Dzungaria. Outside the city walls, a lake on the former course of the Ürümqi River was made into a recreational area for Qing officials. Several years later, the Mongol official Wumi Tai (伍彌泰) built the Xiuye Pavilion (秀野亭), the first structure in the area, which became a major attraction in Dihua. The lake was later called Guan Lake (关湖).

After Tajik adventurer Yakub Beg's brief rule in Dzungaria, Qing general Zuo Zongtang successfully reconquered the area in 1878, and the Qing court established the new province of Xinjiang in 1884. To demonstrate its goodwill, the provincial government built a Dragon King Temple on the lake. Liu Jintang (刘锦棠), the first governor of Xinjiang, made improvements to the lake area, and renamed the lake Jian Hu (鉴湖, Mirror Lake). In 1898, minister Zhang Yinhuan (張蔭桓) was exiled to Xinjiang for supporting the failed Hundred Days' Reform movement. Zhang donated funds to build a pavilion in the middle of Jian Hu, which still stands today.

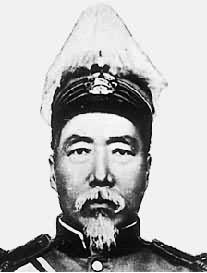
Yang Zengxin, the governor who made Jian Hu a public park

In 1912, Yang Zengxin was appointed governor of Xinjiang by the newly established Republic of China. Yang converted Jian Hu into a public park, which was variously called Jianhu Park, West Lake Park, or West Park. It was later renamed Dihua Park and then Zhongshan Park, in honour of President Sun Yat-sen (Zhongshan).

After the founding of the People's Republic of China in 1949, the Communist government closed the Dragon King Temple and converted it to a cultural palace. The temple buildings have been preserved, including an elaborate front gate that commemorates Zhang Jingchou, a Qing-era scholar and poet. The park was renamed as People's Park.

== Features ==
In 1953, the Xinjiang Uyghur Museum was established in People's Park. The museum was later moved to Xibei Road.

In 1956, the Monument for the People's Martyrs of Xinjiang was erected in the park, which also features children's playgrounds, public sports facilities, gardens, and flower beds.

== Galleries ==
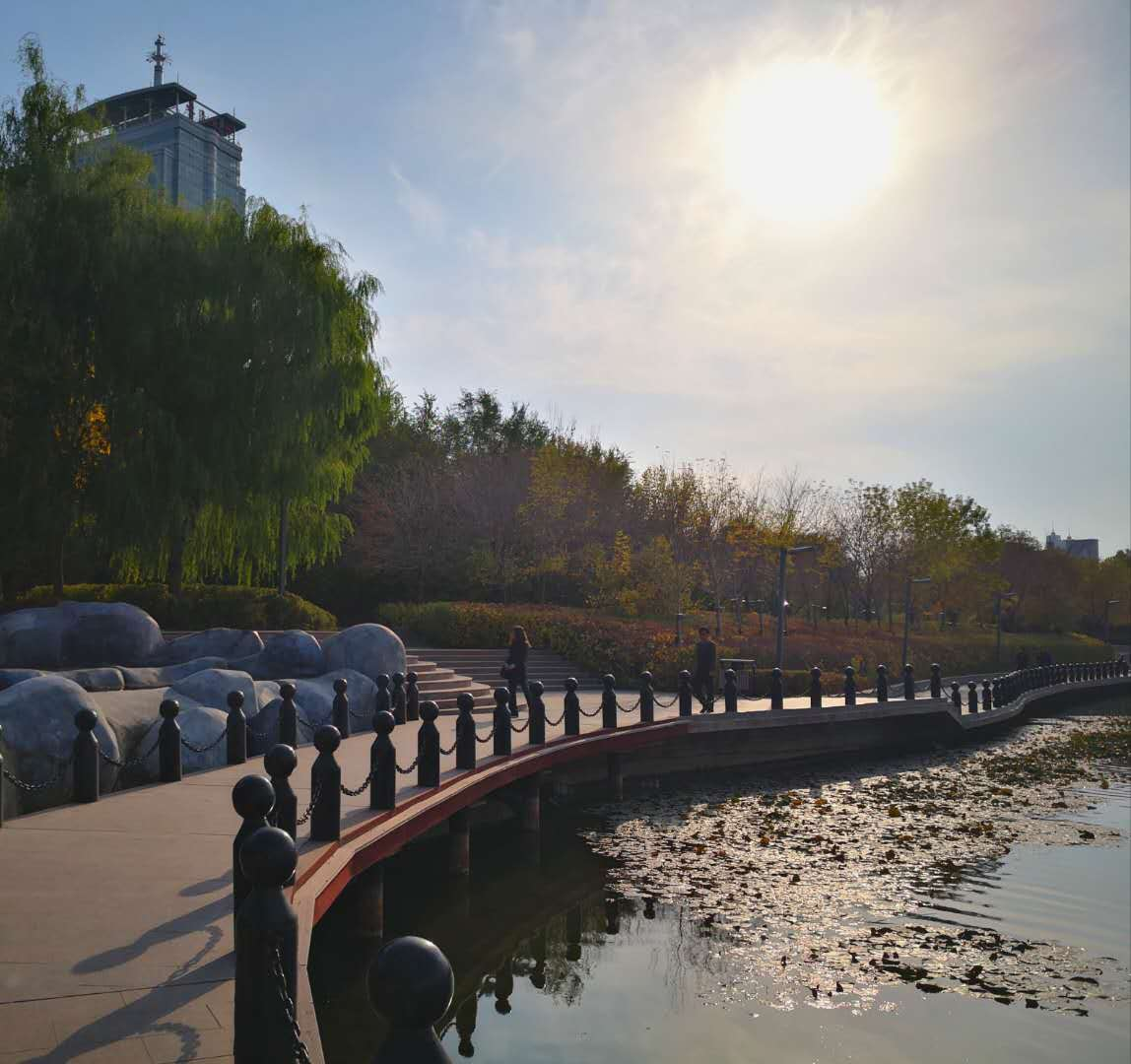
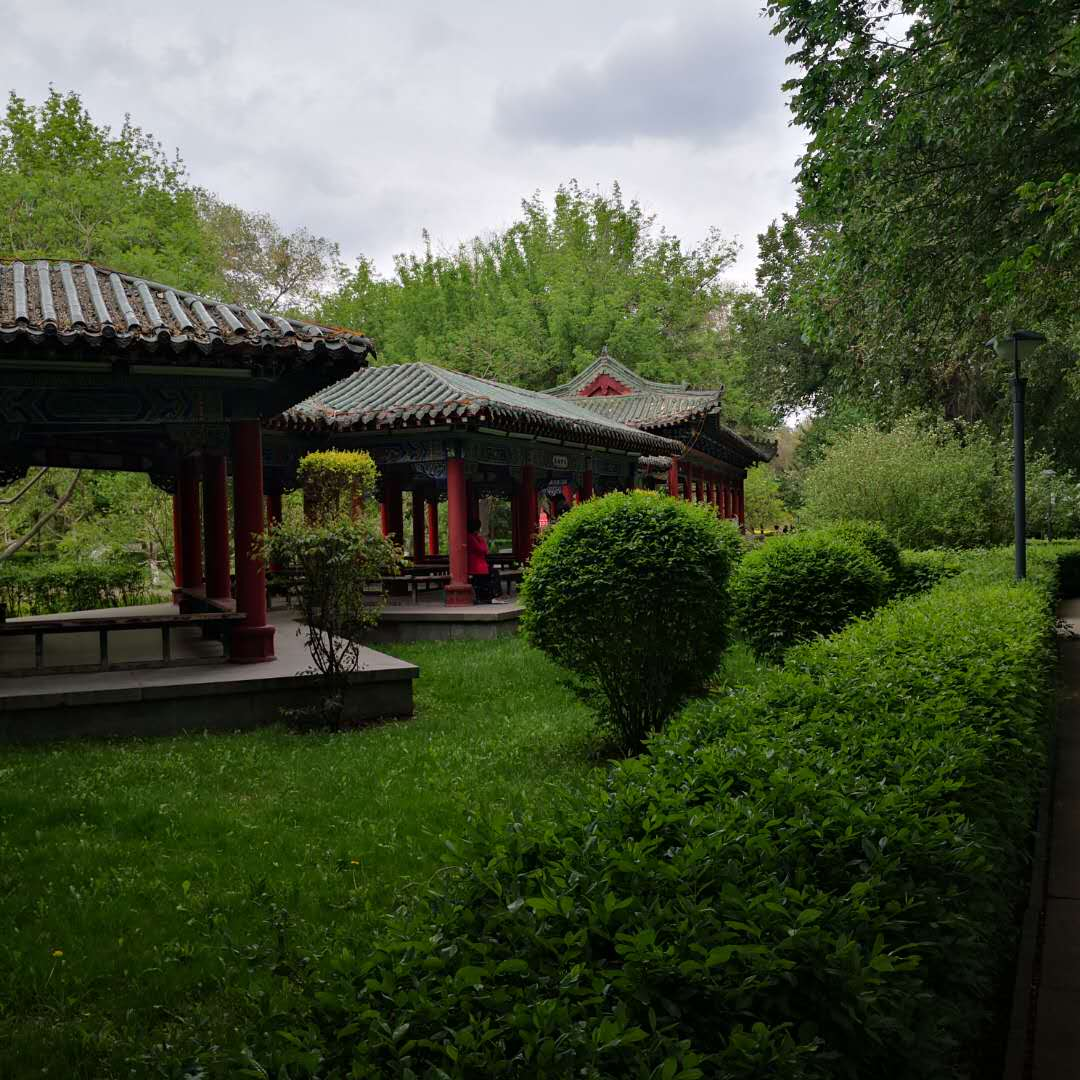
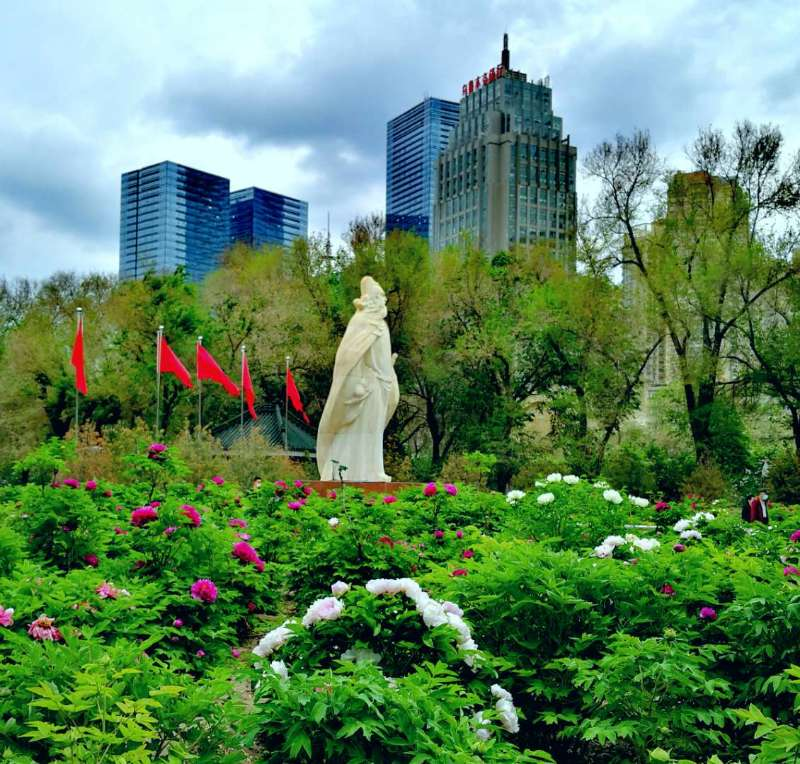
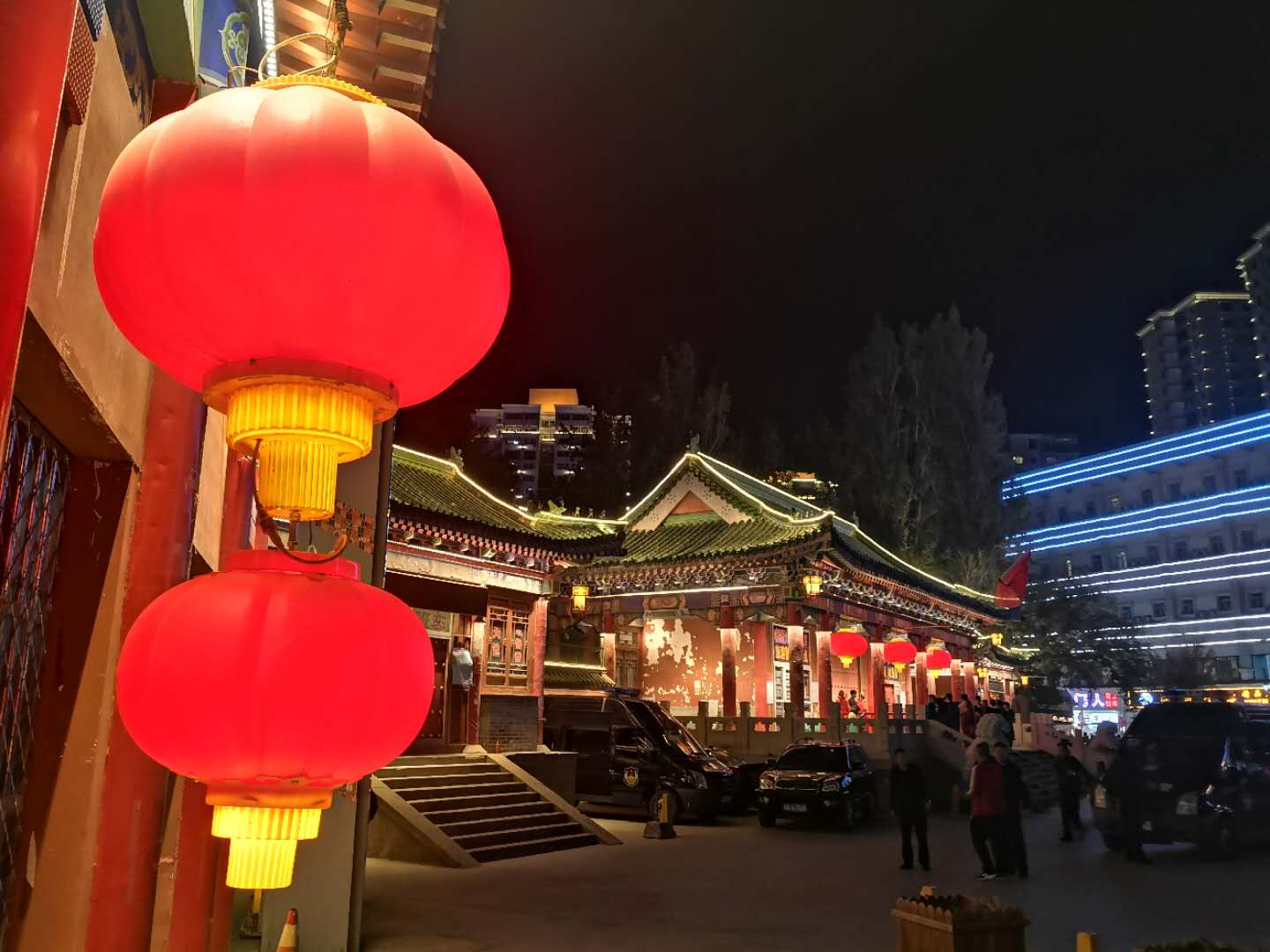
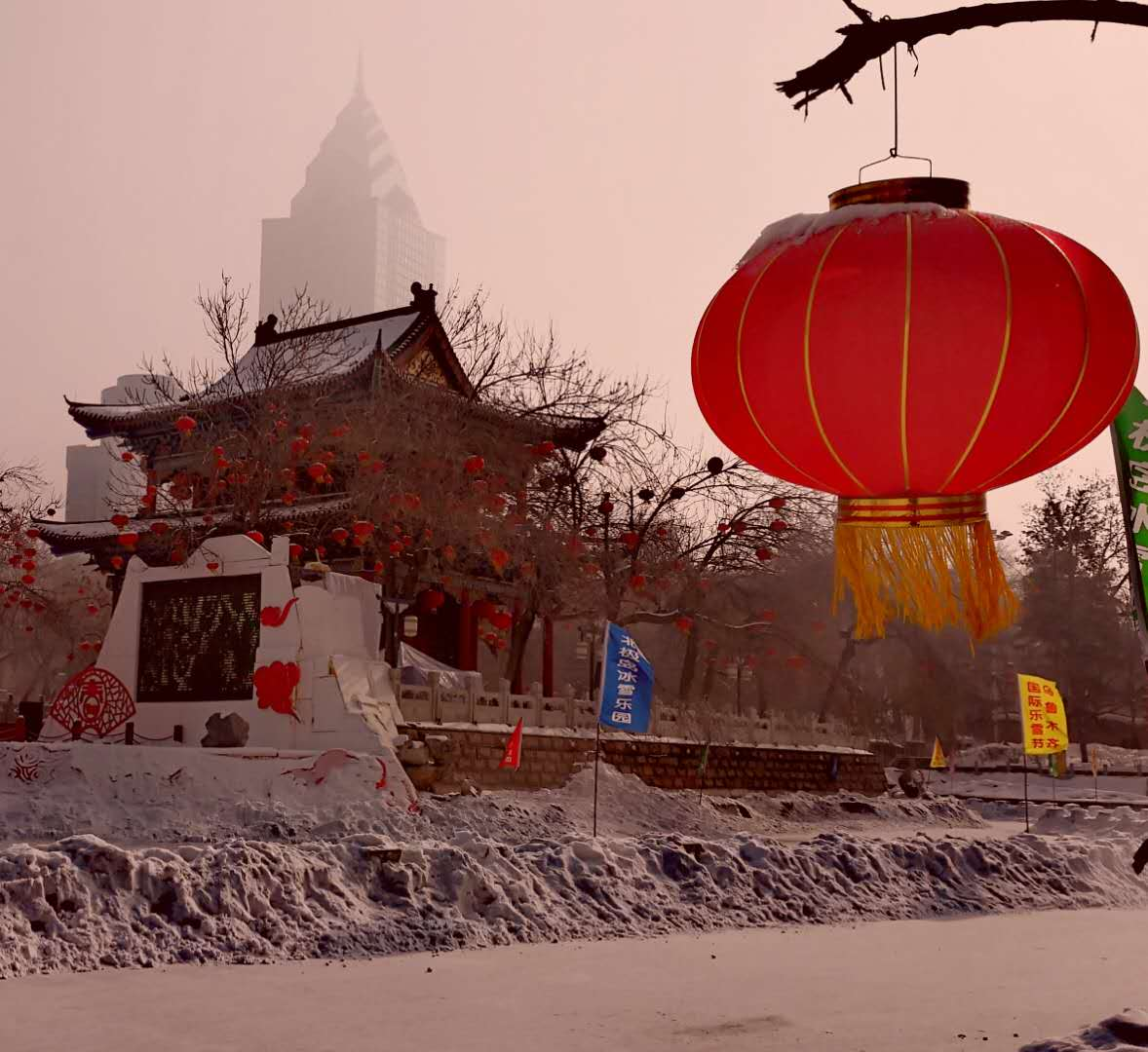
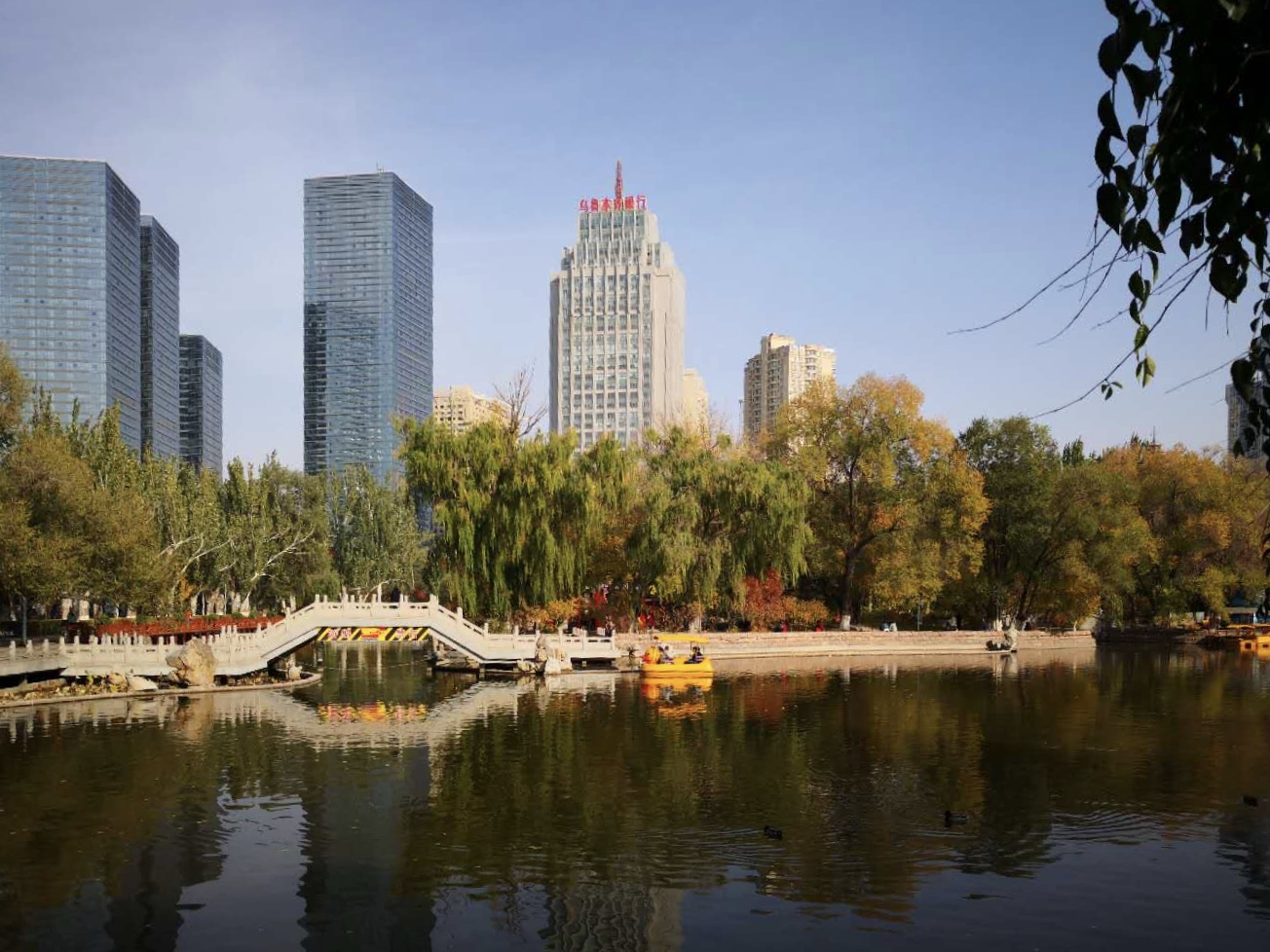
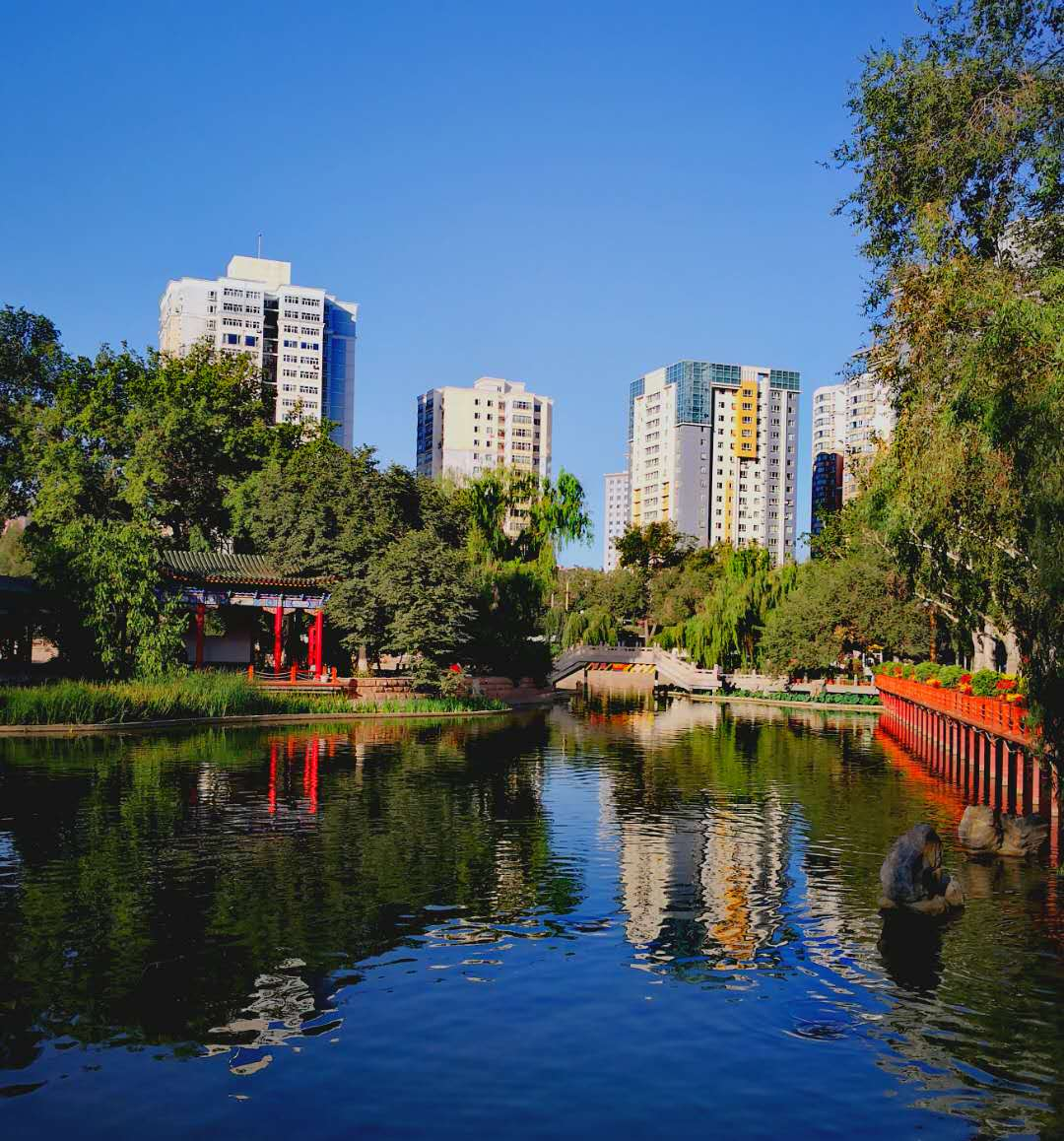
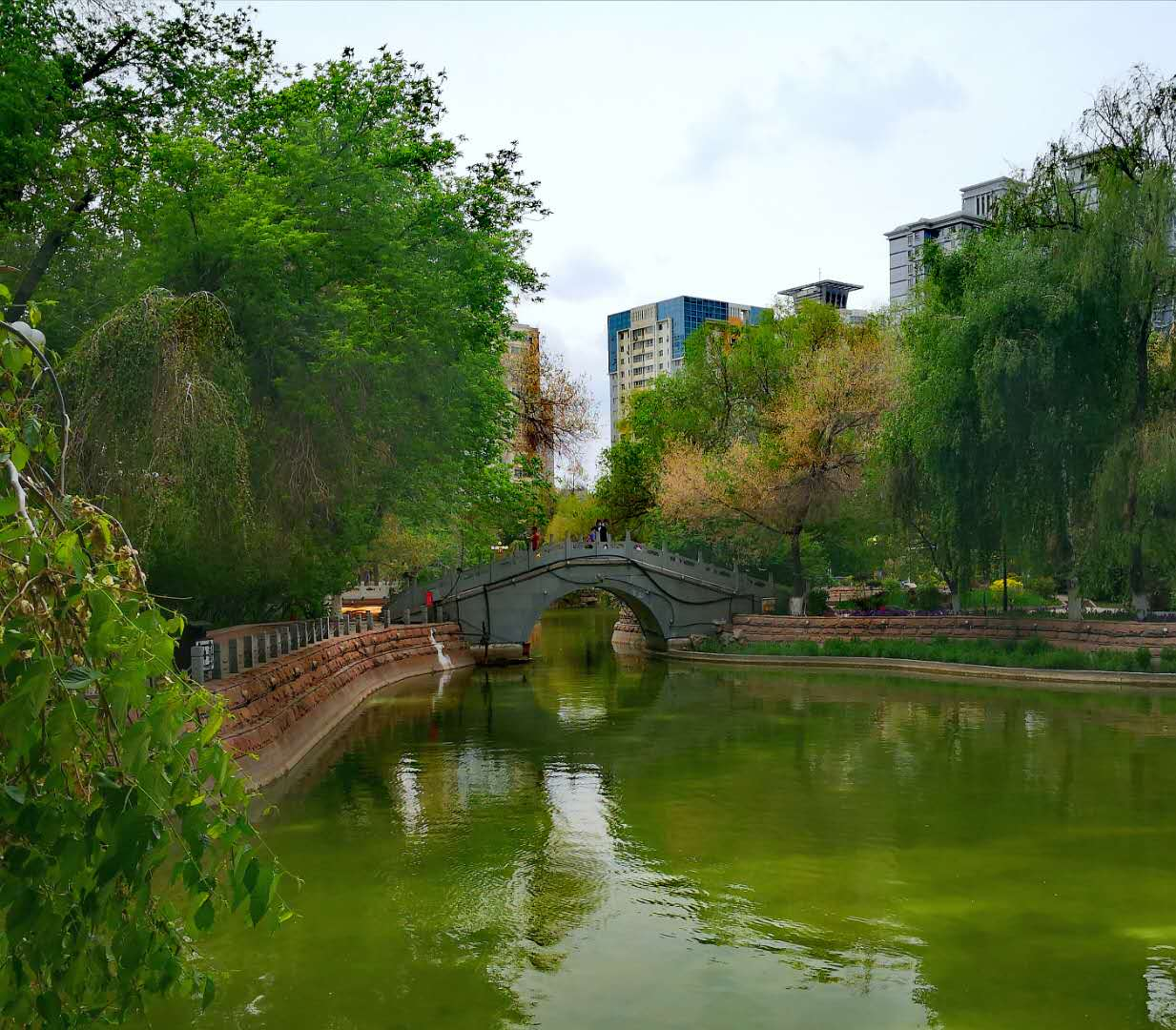
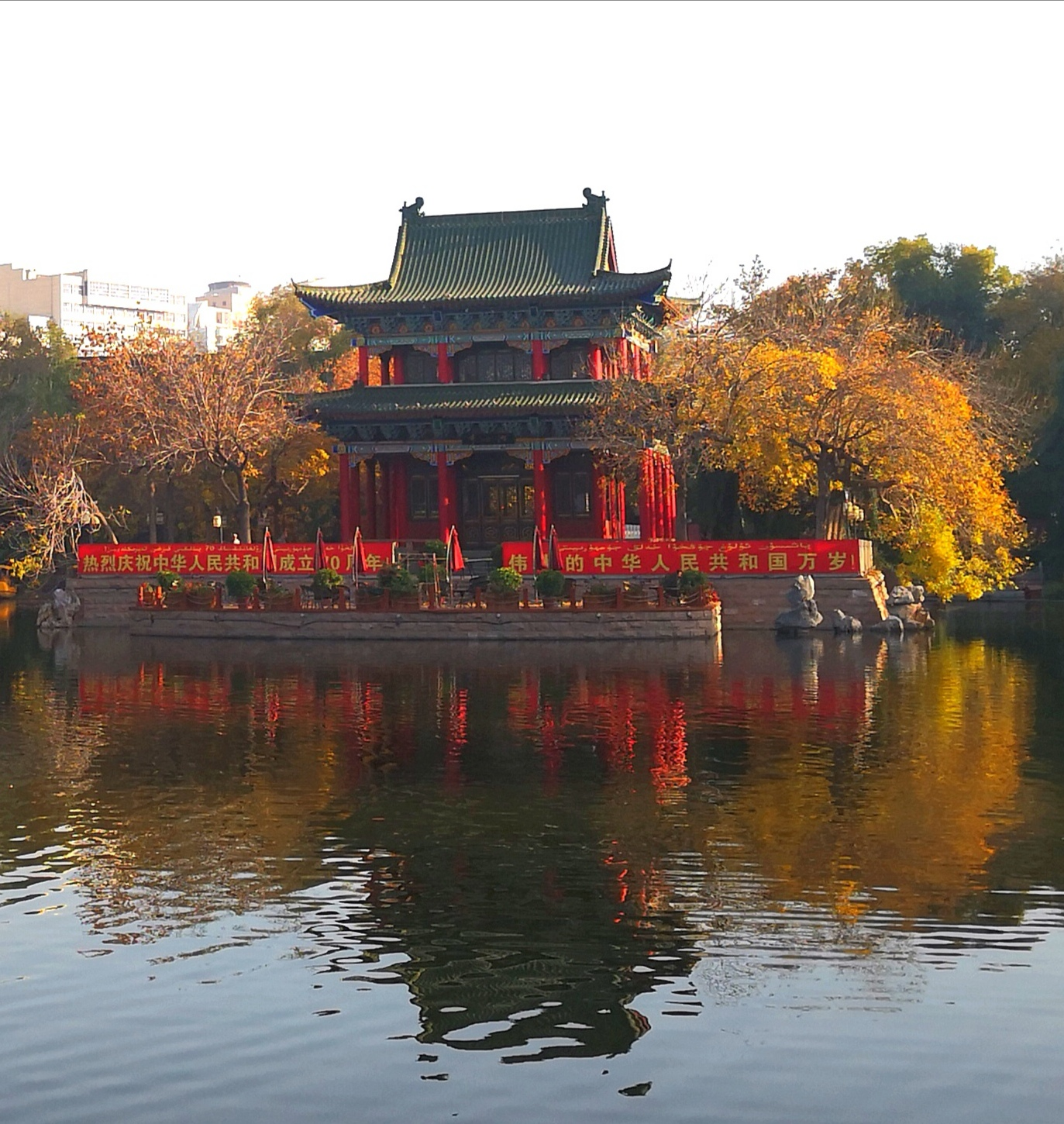
From left to right: Figure 1: Jianhu Lake shore. Figure 2: Train pavilion. Figure 3: Li Bai statue. Figure 4: Close-up view of the north gate of Urumqi People's Park. Figure 5: Jianhu Lake and the pavilion in the middle of the lake, which becomes an ice rink in winter. Figure 6: Boating on Jianhu Lake. Figure 7: Jianhu Lake in summer. Figure 8: Arched bridge in the park. Figure 9: The pavilion in the middle of the lake in autumn.
