= Volksgarten, Cologne =

Park in Cologne, Germany

Coordinates: 50.9209°N 6.9468°E

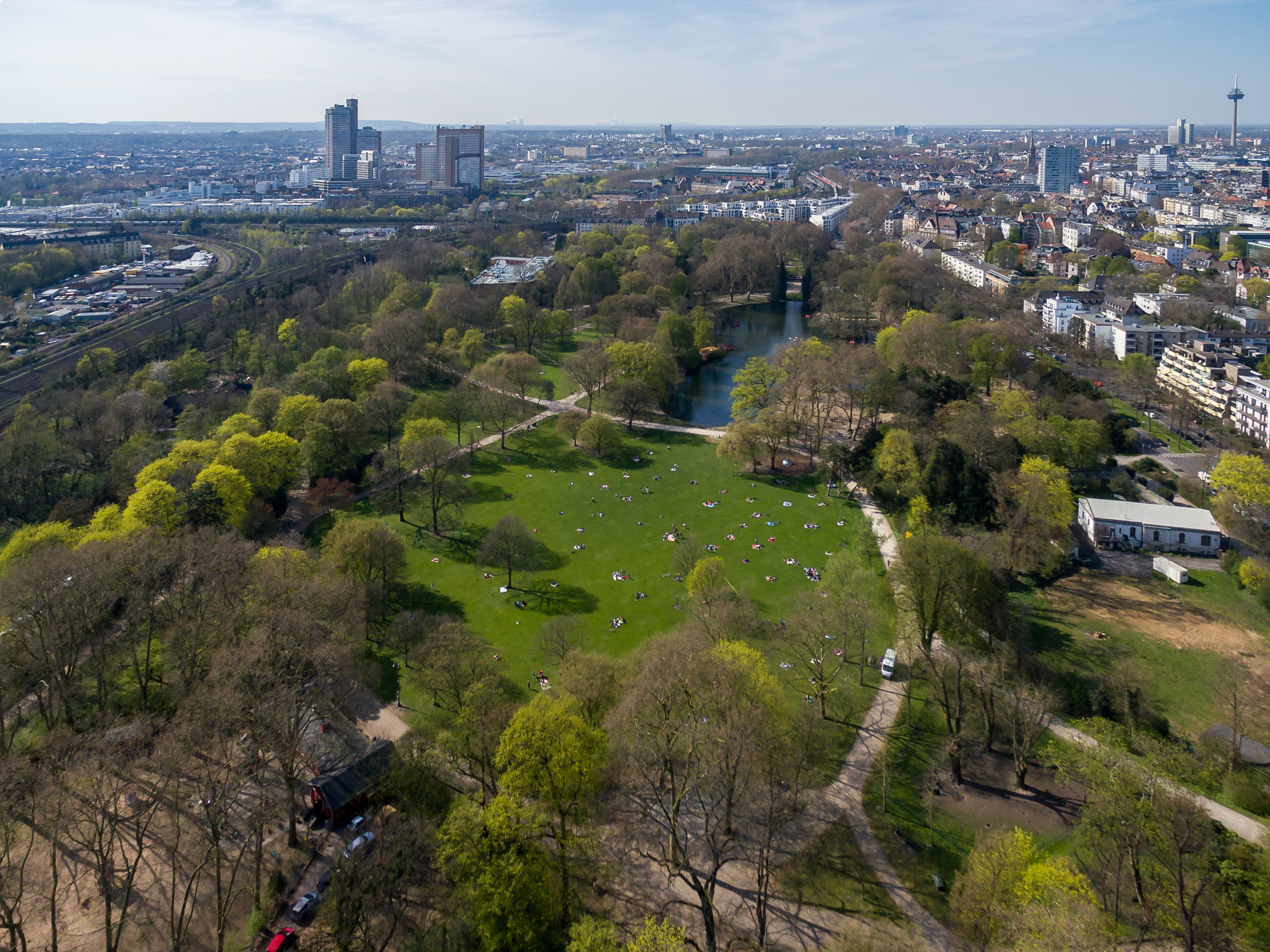
Volksgarten Köln: aerial view from the south-east

The Volksgarten (German: [ˈfɔlksˌɡaʁtn̩]; Kölsch: Volksjahde [ˈfól(ə)ksˌjadə]; English: People's Garden) is a public park in the Neustadt-Süd district of Cologne, Germany.

It is approximately 14 ha (34.5 acres) in size, used for various social activities throughout the year, and can have more than 10.000 visitors on sunny days.

== Location ==
The western rim of the park is a railroad that traverses Cologne, coming from the South Bridge (Südbrücke) and merging with the main and most frequented railroad coming from Bonn in the south and then surrounding most of the city center of Cologne.

To the north, east and south are main streets and adjoining residential areas of the Südstadt (south city area of central Cologne).

== Pond and Fountain ==
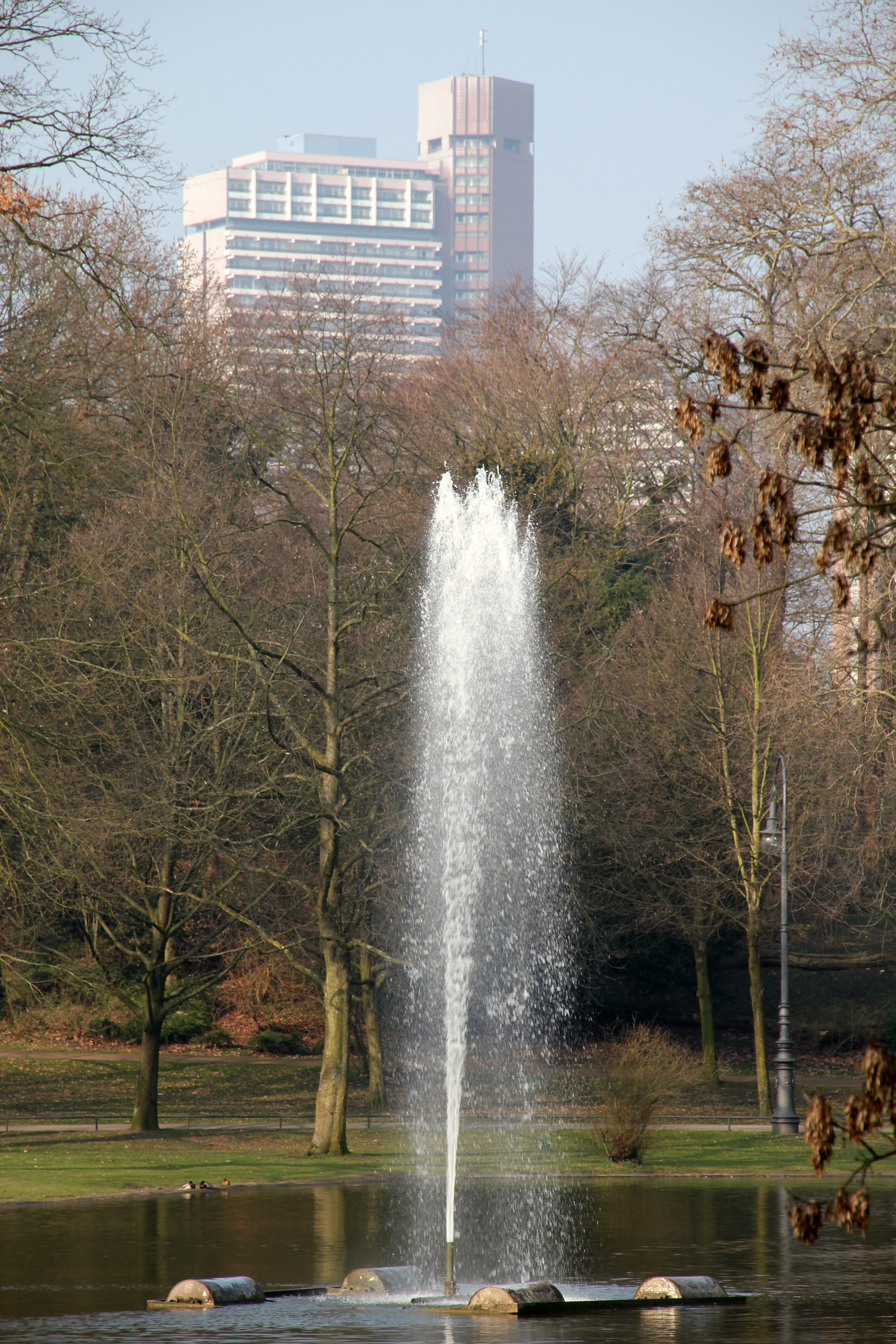
The fountain in pond in the center in the Volksgarten

The Volksgarten contains a large pond (1.3ha, approx. 3.2 acres) with a fountain that rises up to 28 m (91 ft.).

== Children's playground ==
There are two playgrounds for children, one on the north side by the Rosengarten (rose garden), and one on the east by the Volksgartenstraße, with ample sand, various climbing frames, benches for adults.

== Rose Garden ==
The park is well known for its beautiful rose garden with adjoining fort remains, located on its north western edge near the end of Eifelwall at Eifelstraße, behind the stacked railway bridges.

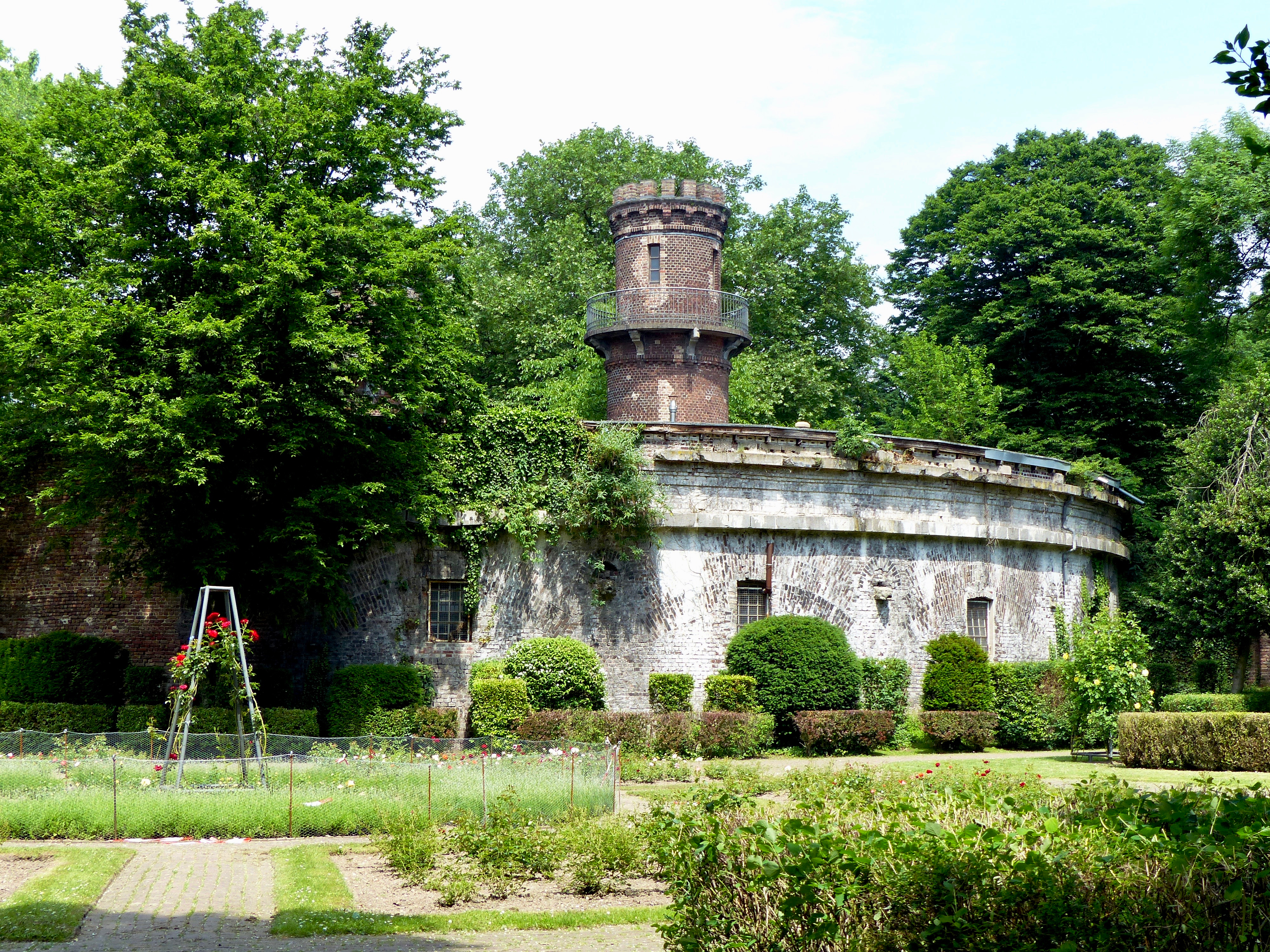
Rose garden with remains of Fort Paul

== History ==
Most of the Volksgarten area was originally used for fortifications. A fortress wall was built on the western side of park. Remains of a small fort still exist on the north end of the park, adjoining the rose garden.

=== Gallery ===
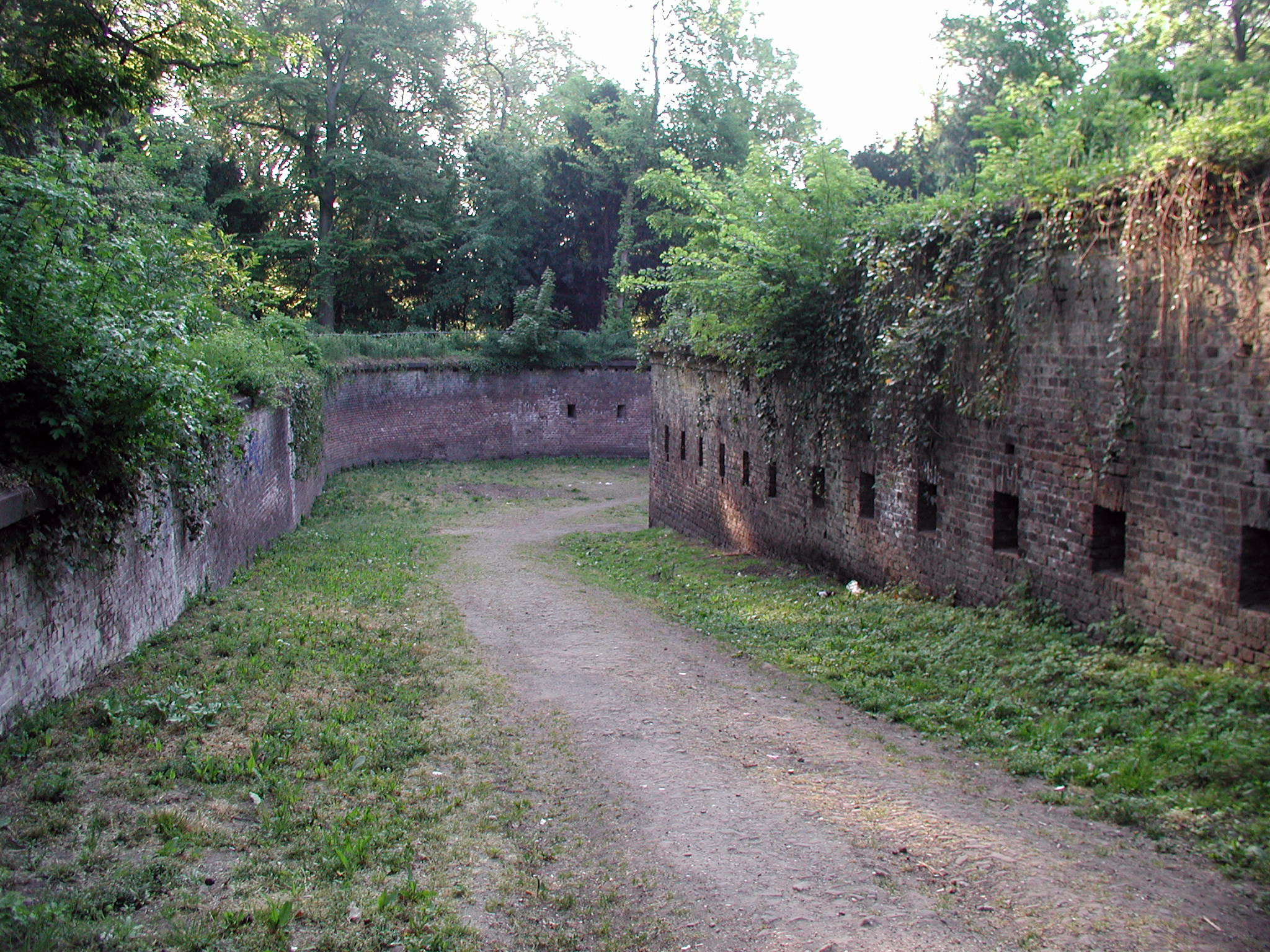
"Kehlgraben" way with fort at right

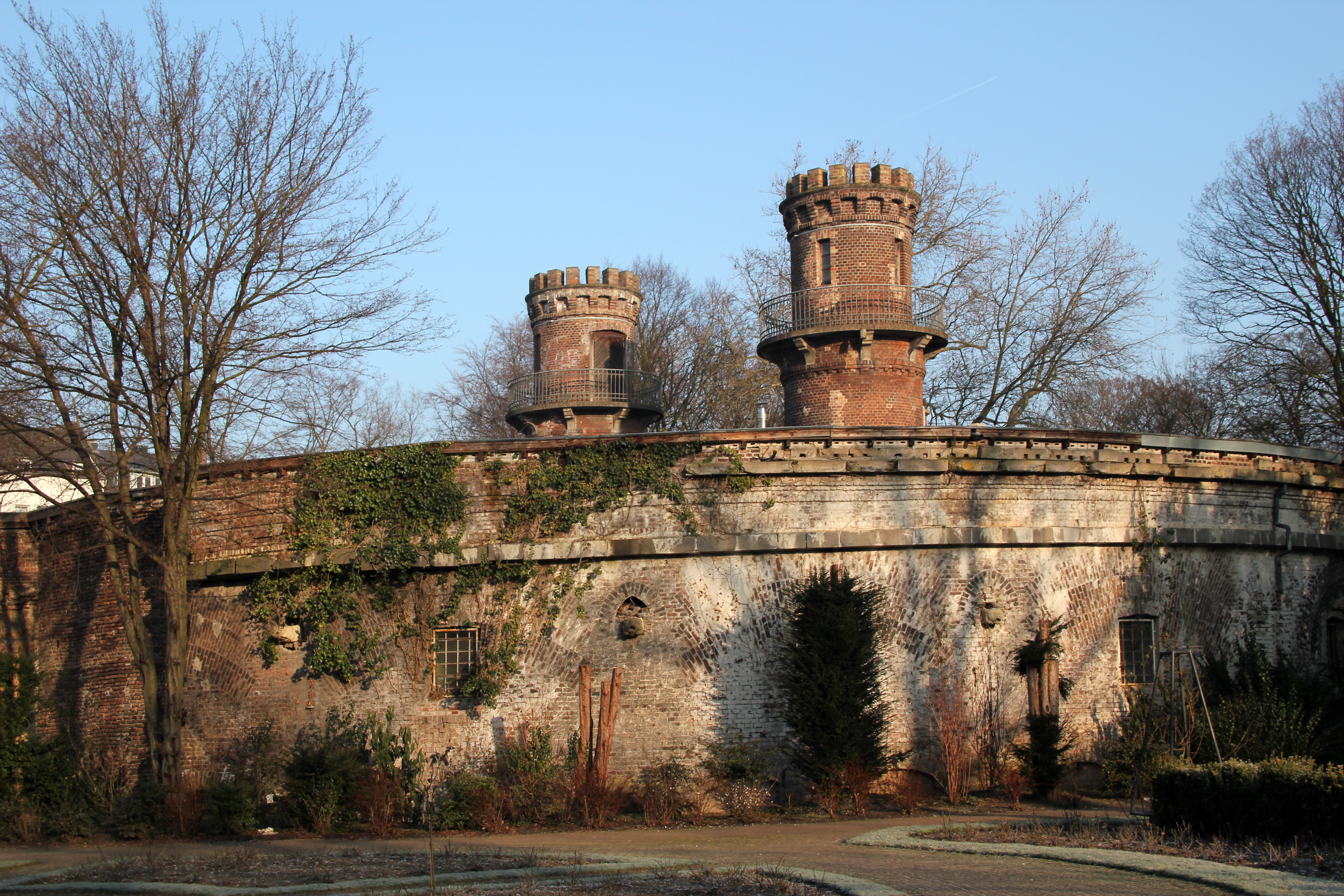
Path from main garden to former fort

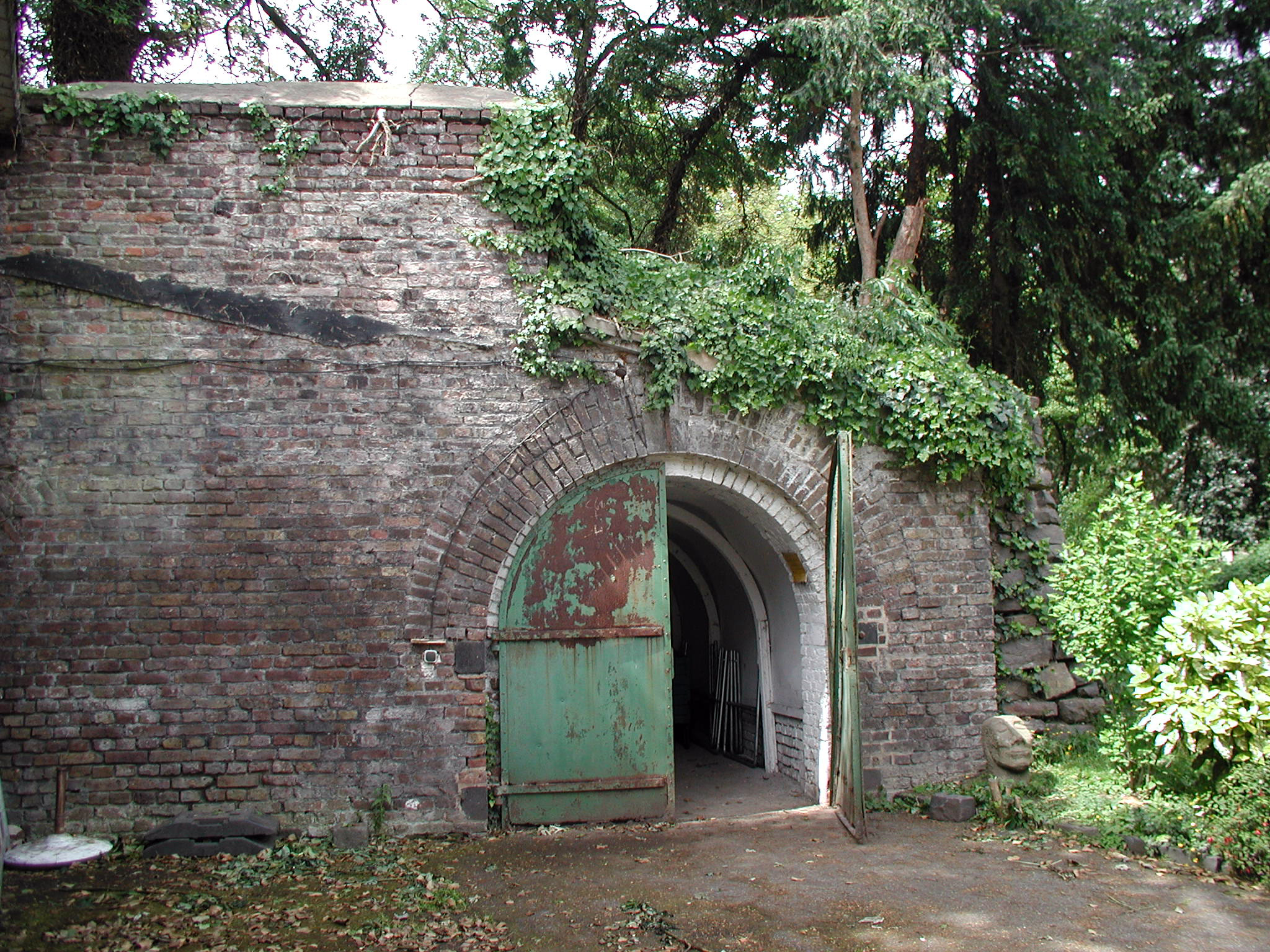
Edge of the former fort with gate
