= People's Park station =

People's Park station may refer to:

- People's Park station (Chengdu Metro), a station on the Chengdu Metro in Chengdu, China
- People's Park station (Nanchang Metro), a station on Line 4 of the Nanchang Metro in Nanchang, China
- People's Park station (Zhengzhou Metro), a station on Line 3 of the Zhengzhou Metro in Zhengzhou, China
- Chinatown MRT station, an interchange station on North East Line and Downtown Line of Singapore MRT, tentatively named "People's Park station"
