= People's Square and Park =

Park surrounding the Shwedagon Pagoda in Yangon, Myanmar

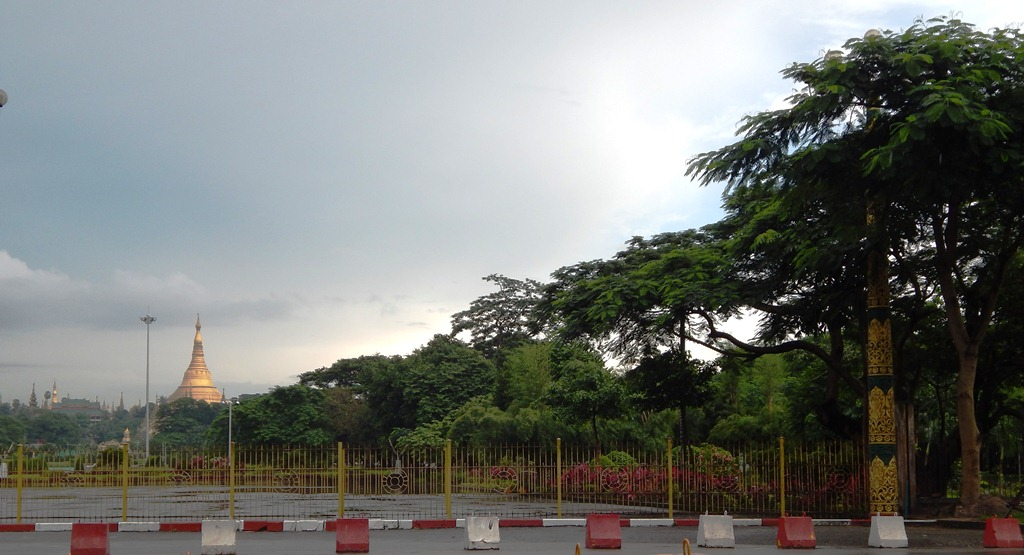
- Interactive map of People's Square and Park
- Type: Urban park
- Location: Yangon
- Coordinates: 16°47′49″N 96°8′34″E
- Area: 135.72 acres (54.92 ha)
- Status: Open all year

The People's Square and Park (Burmese: ပြည်သူ့ရင်ပြင်နှင့် ပြည်သူ့ဥယျာဉ်) is one of the major parks surrounding the Shwedagon Pagoda in Yangon, Myanmar. Located west of the great pagoda to the former Pyithu Hluttaw (People's Parliament) complex, the 135.72 acre (54.92-hectare) park is bounded by Pyay Road to its west, U Wisara Road to its east, Dhammazedi Road to its north and Ahlone Road to its south.

The area had been part of the palace grounds of Queen Shin Sawbu and later a golf course for some years during the colonial days.

A little over half of the complex is the 70.3-acre (284,000 m^{2}) People's Square. A flower- and tree-lined marble esplanade starting from Pyithu Hluttaw towards the Shwedagon Pagoda is the center piece of the square. Over a thousand trees and plants from 52 species make up the square. Pyidaungsu Ayeyeik Nyein occupies a corner of the Square and holds a permanent exhibition of dioramas of various Burmese ethnic groups, specimens of valuable timber and gemstones from various parts of the country.

People's Park occupies 65.42 acres (264,700 m^{2}) adjacent to the square in the north. Over 3,000 plants including 72 species of trees, 12 species of bamboo and 50 species of shrubs and climbers indigenous to various parts of the country are planted in this park. botanical maze, flower displays, fruit trees and medicinal herbs account for an additional 17,000 flowering plants.
