= Folkets Park, Copenhagen =

Park in Copenhagen, Denmark

Coordinates: 55.687521°N 12.554828°E

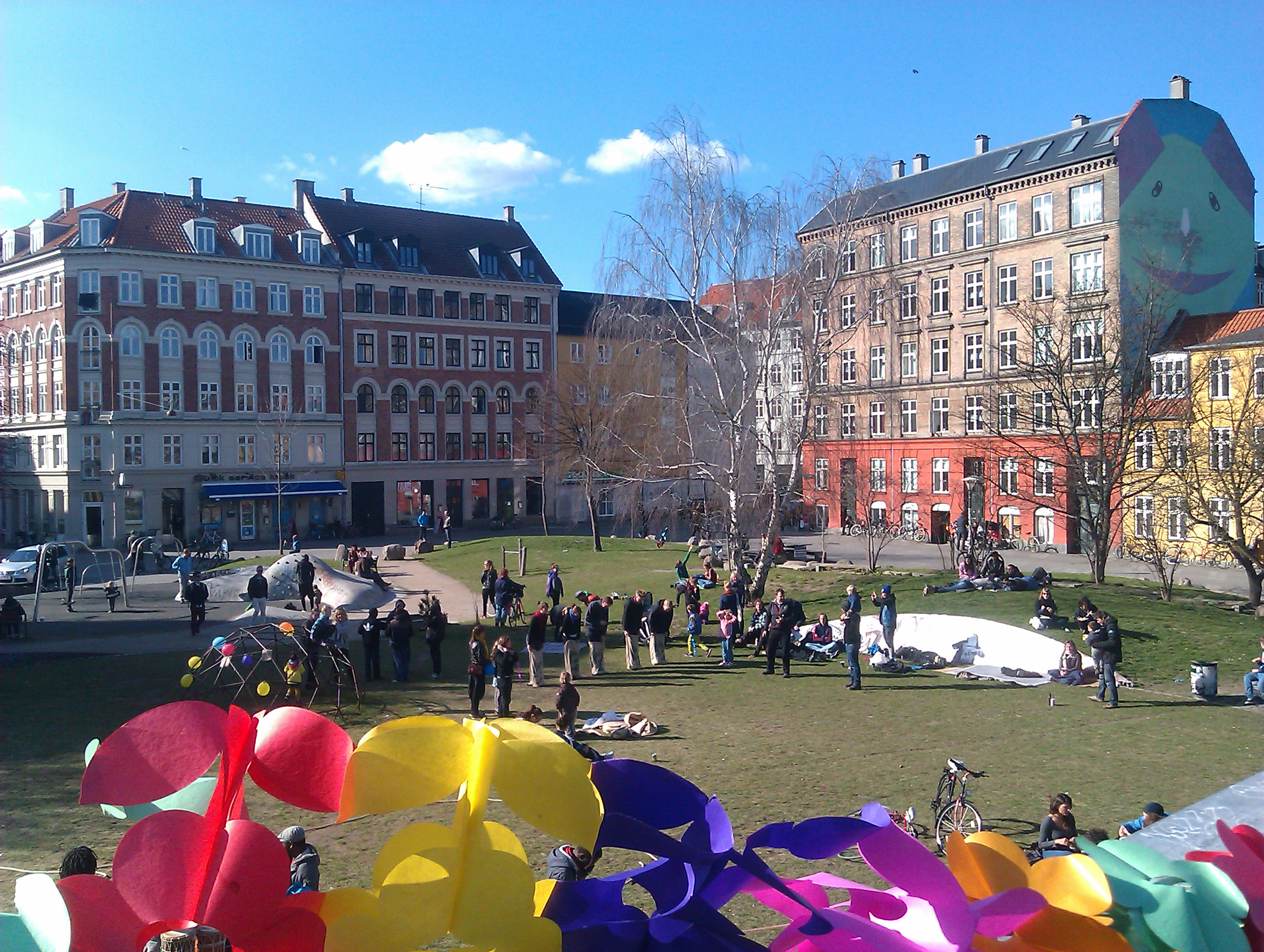
An image of Folkets Park, Copenhagen

Folkets Park (Danish for "People's park") is a small park in Nørrebro in Copenhagen, situated between Griffenfeldsgade and Stengade.

The park was established by local residents in 1971, who also converted a disused building in the park into a community center, Folkets Hus. After intermittent attempts to clear the park, the City of Copenhagen accepted it as a park in 2008, and performed some renovation.
