= Sun Yat Sen Park =

Sun Yat Sen Park may refer to:

- Dr. Sun Yat Sen Municipal Park, park in Macau
- Sun Yat-sen Park (Montreal)
- Sun Yat Sen Memorial Park, park in Hong Kong
- Sun Yat-Sen Park (Chicago), park in Chinatown, Chicago
- Zhongshan Park, parks in honour of Sun Yat Sen in China
- Dr. Sun Yat-Sen Classical Chinese Garden in Vancouver, Canada
- Sun Yat-sen Memorial Hall with attached Memorial Park, Taipei
- Sun Yat-Sen Park (Maui)
