= Chinatown, Chicago =

Neighborhood in Chicago, Illinois, United States

- Neighborhood
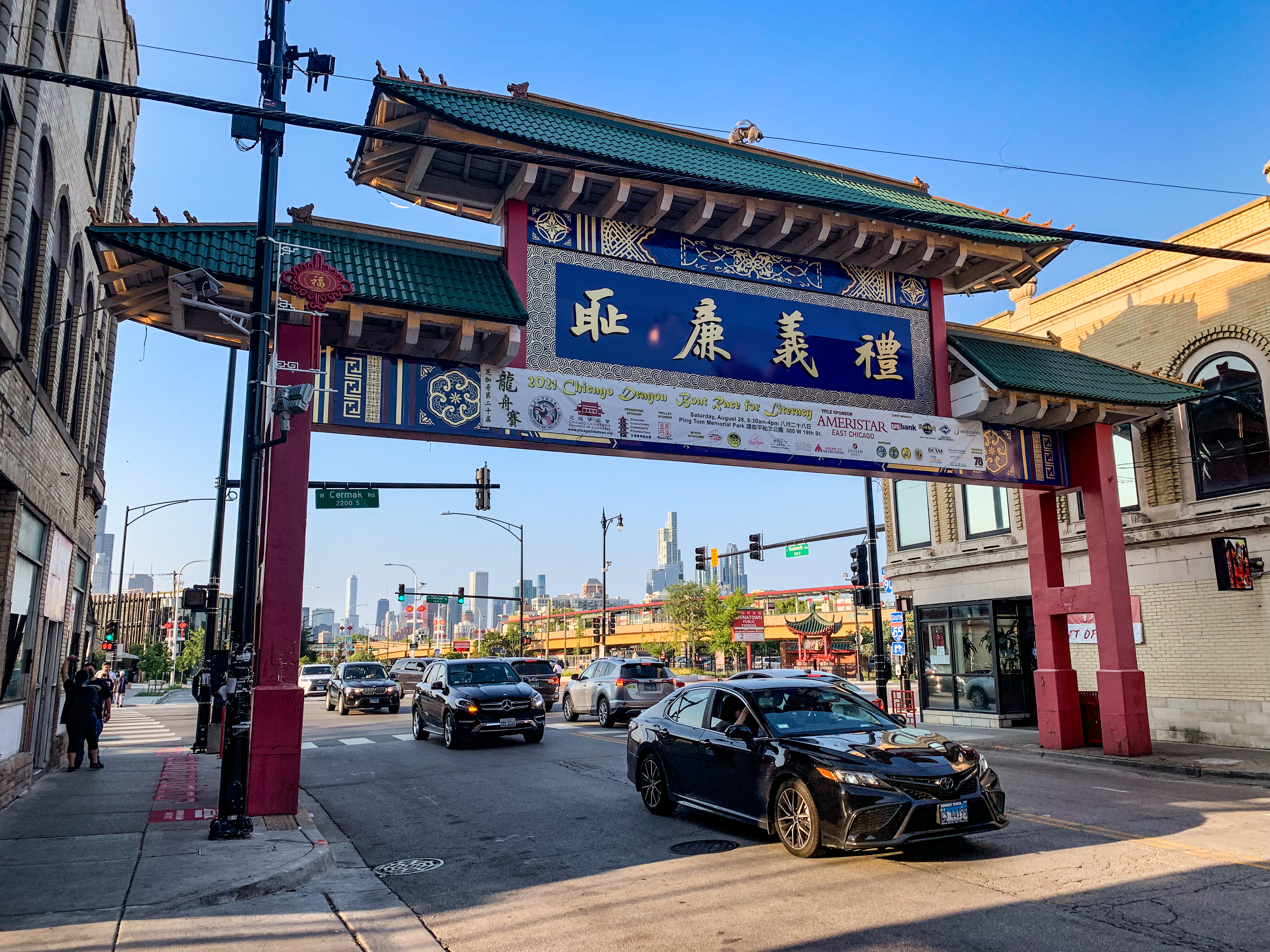
- The Chinatown Gate over Wentworth Avenue

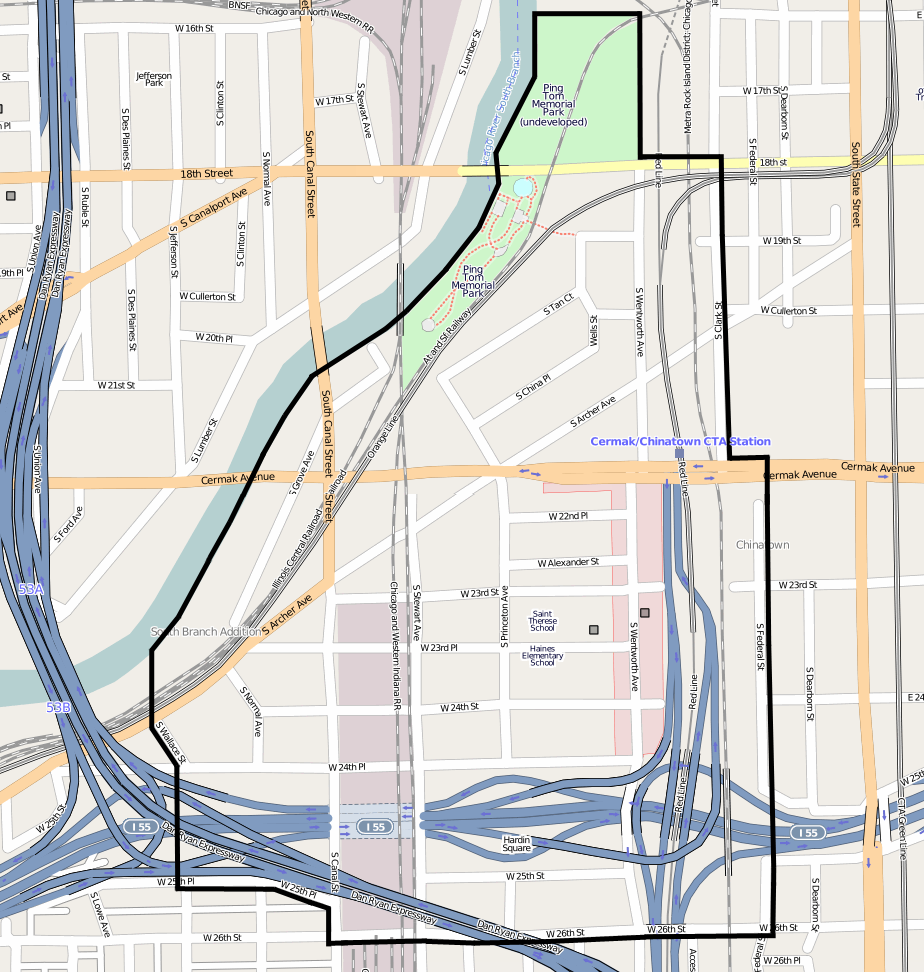
- Map of Chinatown
- Coordinates: 41°51′09″N 87°37′55″W
- Country: United States
- City: Chicago
- Community areas: Armour Square
- First settled: 1912

Population
  - Estimate (2010): 16,325
- ZIP code: 60616

Chinatown is a neighborhood in the Armour Square community area on the South Side of Chicago. Over a third of Chicago's Chinese population resides in this ethnic enclave, making it one of the largest concentrations of Chinese-Americans in the United States. It formed around 1912, after settlers moved south from near the Loop, where the first enclaves were established in the 19th century.

Chinatown is sometimes confused with an area on the city's North Side, "New Chinatown", which is largely populated by people of Southeast Asian heritage.

== History ==
=== Initial migration and "old" Chinatown ===
Looking to escape the anti-Chinese violence that had broken out on the west coast, the first Chinese people arrived in Chicago after 1869 when the first transcontinental railroad was completed. Aside from ethnic violence, governments on the west coast had begun to systematically target Chinese people, such as a 1870 San Francisco ordinance that taxed laundrymen who used horseless wagons for their deliveries. This discrimination on the west coast, in tandem with poor economic conditions at the time, led to intense Chinese migration to other areas of the United States. Further aiding this rapid migration was the fact that many Chinese people lost their jobs after the completion of the transcontinental railroad, as they had made up 90% of the workforce for the Central Pacific Railroad.

At first, Chinese people in Chicago were largely welcomed by their fellow Chicagoans of all races. As early immigrant Moy Dong Chow would later state, "the Chicagoans found us a peculiar people to be sure, but they liked to mix with us." The willingness of Chinese Chicagoans to accept Christian missions in Chinatown also helped ease tensions between the two groups. By 1909, there were two Christian missions in old Chinatown, and eight other missions dedicated to serving ethnic Chinese.

This acceptance led to a prospering early Chinese community in Chicago. By the late 1800s, 25% of Chicago's approximately 600 Chinese residents settled along Clark Street between Van Buren and Harrison Streets in Chicago's Loop. In the mid-1870s, the Kim Kee Company opened a store selling imported Chinese goods and ingredients, and in the basement of the same building stood a Chinese-owned restaurant. In 1889, 16 Chinese-owned businesses were located along the two-block stretch, including eight grocery stores, two butcher shops and a restaurant. Other businesses operated in the early Chinatown included gambling houses, headquarters of family associations, and Christian mission houses. Further, grocery stores in Chinatown could double as cultural centers, where people would gamble, consume rice wine, and smoke cigars. Laundry services were also important to the average working Chinese man in the original Chinatown, with 198 Chinese laundries by 1883. However, by 1897, white Chicagoans had begun to open laundry businesses as well. Many white laundrymen offered services cheaper than those of Chinese laundrymen, causing the leaders of Chinatown to declare "war" on the "cheap foreign labor" that was hurting Chinese laundry businesses in the area. By 1903, white Chicagoans also became highly interested in the increasingly popular "fad" of chop suey restaurants in Chinatown, with the cuisine developing a "mysterious" aura among whites. This helped lead to the opening of more restaurants on Clark Street.

By the turn of the century, numerous powerful clans and family associations rose up among the Chinese population in Chicago. The first and most powerful was the Moy clan, who were the de facto leaders of the Chinese people in Chicago, and, even from this earlier period of migration, the Moy Family Association came to be the largest association in the city. From 1898 to 1940, there were over six thousand immigrant files in Chicago, and over one thousand of these files contained the name "Moy". Sam Moy was the first "mayor" of Chinatown, and he acted as an interpreter and interacted with city officials on behalf of the area. Besides the Moy clan, other major clans in early Chinatown were the Wong and Chin clans. The prevalence of just a few surnames reflects the phenomenon of chain migration and the continuing propensity of transnational ties that existed within early Chinatown.

Following the 1906 San Francisco earthquake, Chinese Americans arrived in Chicago in droves and were vehemently supported by the city's Chinese residents, largely due to the preexisting clan associations that sought to take care of their kinsmen. The importance of clan ties for finding success in Chinatown continued for decades, with many clans financing businesses through fellow members of their family association or strictly hiring kinsmen to work in their businesses. The Chinese population more than doubled from 1890 to 1900, with many of these new migrants residing in the original Chinatown. In terms of ties to mainland China, the large majority of the early Chinese people in Chicago were from Taishan, such as influential merchants Chin Foin and Moy Dong Chow.

Old Chinatown, like other highly populated Chinatowns in cities across the country, was a major site of the Tong Wars, and there were several high-profile incidents related to these wars throughout early Chinatown's history. In 1909, a large shootout broke out between different Tongs, leading to mass arrests. Later, in 1911 Lee Yip Wing and Moy Dong Tong were shot for failing to comply with demands by the Hip Sing Tong. The Tong Wars would continue for the next several decades, with Chicago and Chinatown constantly preparing for another outbreak of violence. For example, in 1930 extra police details were sent to Chinatown after a truce was called off between the warring parties.

=== Relocation south ===
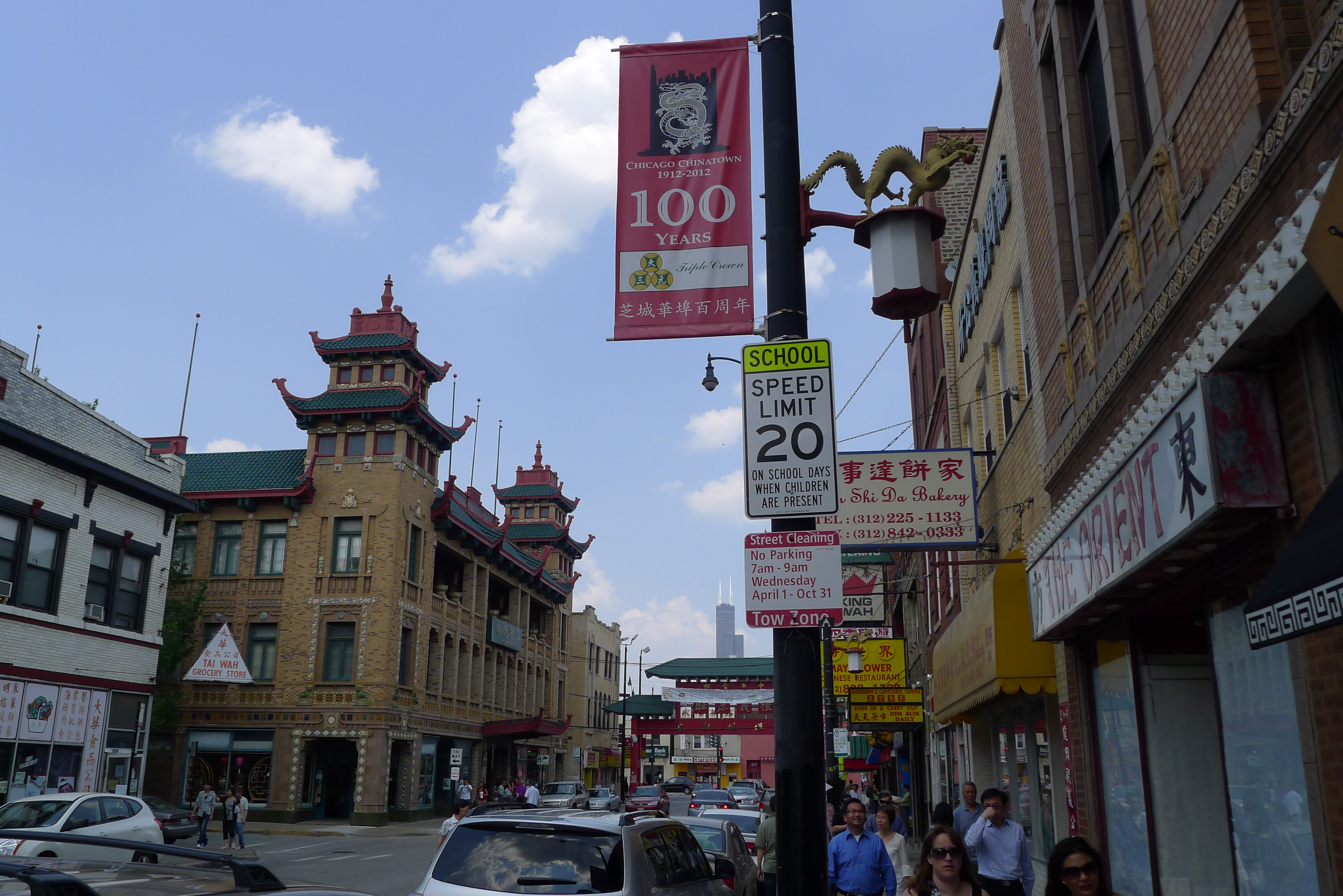
Chicago's Chinatown celebrated the 100th anniversary of its relocation in 2012.

While Chinese people in Chicago had been relatively welcomed by the locals in the past, the renewal of the Chinese Exclusion Act in 1892, in tandem with the World's Columbian Exposition in Chicago in 1893, brought a significant amount of discrimination to the Chinese population. Because of this, in 1912, Chinese people living in this area began moving south to Armour Square, with about half of all Chinese people moving out of Clark Street into the South Side by this time. Some historians say this was due to increasing rent prices, as rents were significantly higher for Chinese businesses than similar white businesses. Others see more complex causes: discrimination, overcrowding, a high non-Chinese crime rate, and disagreements between the two associations ("tongs") within the community, the Hip Sing Tong and the On Leong Tong. However, the move was largely a result of multiple factors, including racial prejudice, cultural bias, and economic competition. One such example of racial prejudice was incited by the murder of Elsie Sigel in New York City by a supposedly Chinese man, which made white residents in Chicago suspicious of the close relationship between white women and Chinese men in their own city. Yet another factor that precipitated the move further south was the impending construction of a federal building in the heart of the old Chinatown in 1911, which would require many Chinese-owned buildings to be demolished. By 1911, prominent Chinese men in Chicago were already negotiating with property holders about moving two miles south.

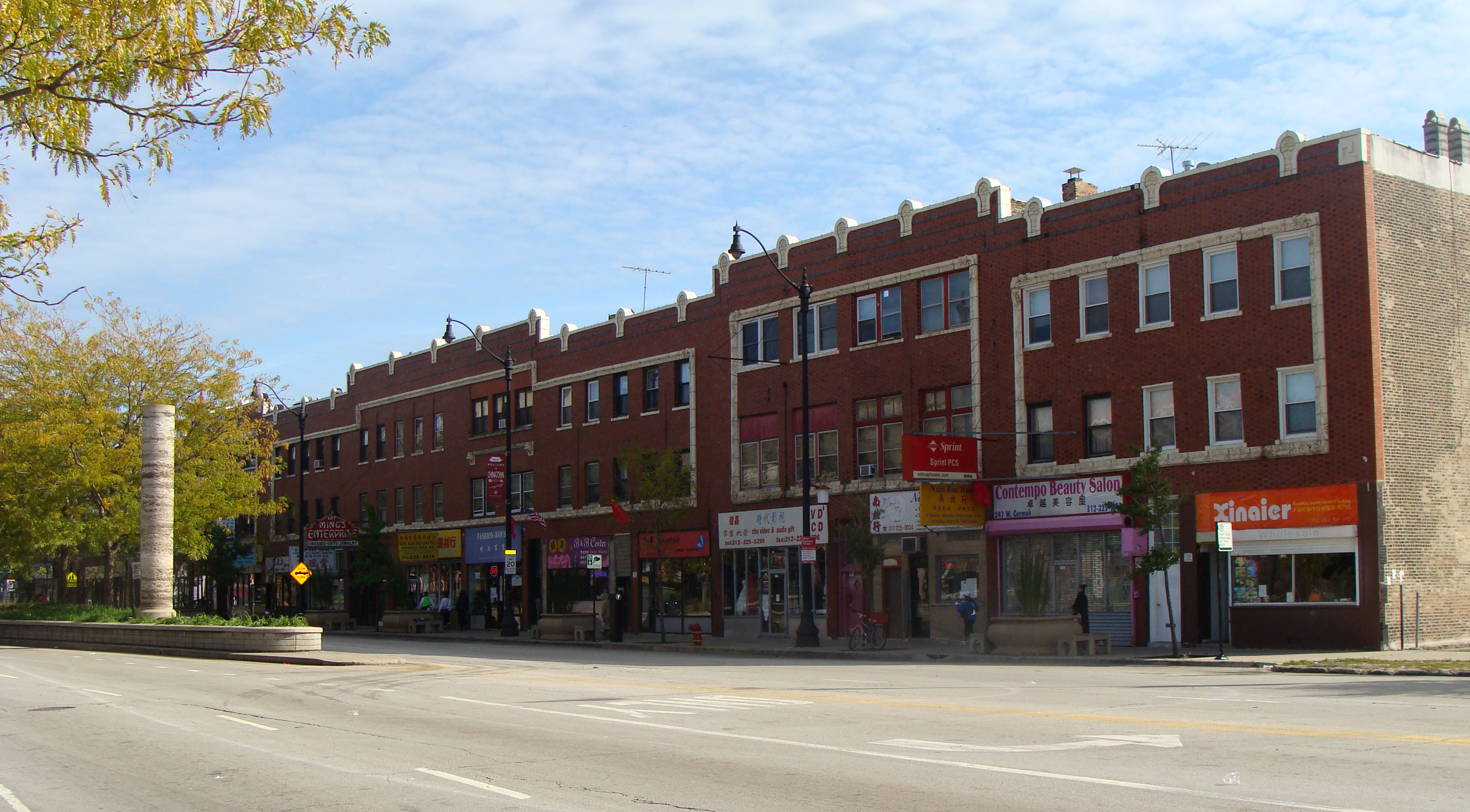
The On Leong Chinese Merchants Association headquarters building on Cermak Road (2009)

In response to this, the move to the new South Side Chinatown was led by the On Leong Merchants Association who, in 1912, had a building constructed along Cermak Road (then 22nd Street) that could house 15 stores, 30 apartments and the Association's headquarters. While the building's design was typical of the period, it also featured Chinese accents such as tile trim adorned with dragons. The total cost of the building was $200,000. In addition, the On Leong Merchants Association purchased a series of ten year leases to develop the surrounding area. Thus, starting in 1912, the area near Wentworth Avenue and Cermak Road was officially proclaimed the "New Chinatown". Even in the first year of this move south, Chinese people in the new Chinatown faced significant discrimination from the established Italian community in Armor Square, causing them to restrict the new Chinatown to just one square block at 22nd Street and Princeton Avenue. This discrimination was a continuation of tensions that were present before the move south, when non-Chinese residents fearing a "yellow invasion" sought to block Chinese people buying property in Armour Square.

The new Chinatown would come to hold over one-third of Chicago's two thousand strong Chinese population soon after its founding. Politically, many in new Chinatown were united in their strong support of the Republic of China. In 1919, a visit to Chinatown by Wang Chen Wei, the right-hand man of the Republic's first president Sun Yat-sen, produced a large parade with many Republican banners flying. As new Chinatown grew significantly, the old Chinatown was left largely empty of ethnic Chinese inhabitants. According to one contemporary journalist, by 1927 there were a hundred "for rent" signs on the windows of the old Chinatown, with only two Chinese businesses remaining.

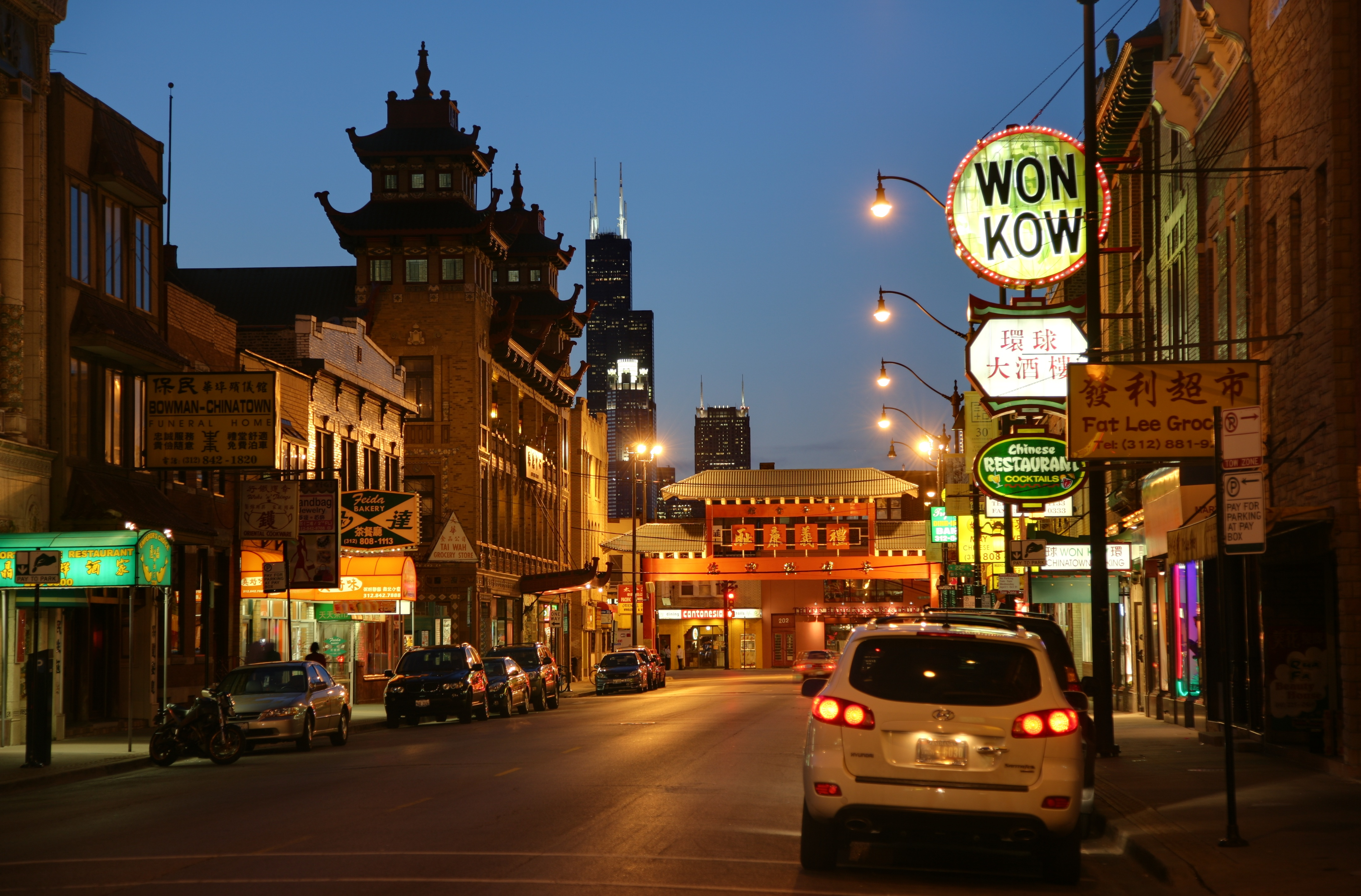
On Leong Merchants Association Building and the Won Kow Building (2009)

In the 1920s, Chinese community leaders secured approximately 50 ten-year leases on properties in the newly developing Chinatown. Because of severe racial discrimination, these leases needed to be secured via an intermediary, H. O. Stone Company. Jim Moy, then-director of the On Leong Merchants Association, then decided that a Chinese-style building should be constructed as a strong visual announcement of the Chinese community's new presence in the area. With no Chinese-born architects in Chicago at the time, Chicago-born Norse architects Christian S. Michaelsen and Sigurd A. Rognstad were asked to design the new On Leong Merchants Association Building in spring 1926. Michaelsen and Rognstad drew their final design after studying texts on Chinese architecture. When the building opened in 1928 at a cost of a million dollars, it was the finest large Chinese-style structure in any North American Chinatown. While the overall structure of the building was fairly commonplace for the time, it was marked with two massive pagoda towers to frame it. The On Leong Association allowed the Chinese Consolidated Benevolent Association to put its headquarters in the new building and also used it as an immigrant assistance center, a school, a shrine, a meeting hall, and office space for the Association itself. It was often informally referred to as Chinatown's "city hall".

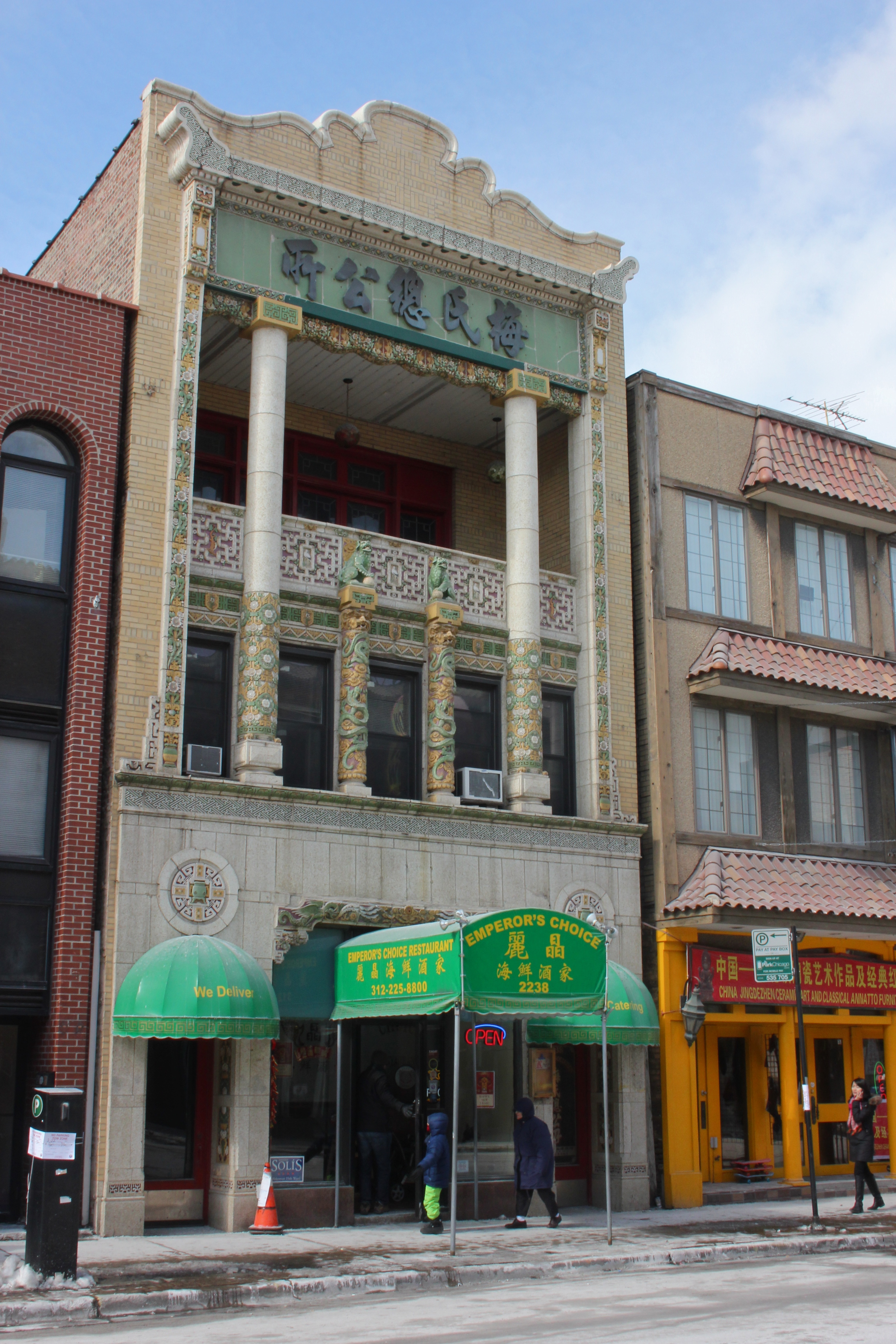
Moy Association Building (2015)

Economically, by the 1930s, a large portion of Chinese businesses in the new Chinatown were large grocery stores stocking imported goods. Through transnational associations, these initial Chinese-owned stores substantiated a strong link between Chicago's Chinatown, other Chinatowns in the United States, and even East Asia itself. For example, the Moy-owned Hip Lung Yee Kee company on Wentworth Avenue facilitated communication between associations in San Francisco, Chicago, and Hong Kong. The grocery stores in Chinatown at this time also had a very important role locally. They employed over six hundred Chinese locals, and they functioned as hotels and banks as well. Otherwise, Chinese restaurants were key to Chinatown's economy in this period. By 1930, there were at least eleven restaurants located in the new Chinatown. Often, these restaurants were places of fine dining, and, therefore, also acted as gathering places to connect Chinatown's elites with the elites of Chicago in general. For example, Mong Long Fo's restaurant was the site of a publicized meeting between two members of the Moy clan and three of Chicago's white elite. Overall, though, the economic situation for many Chinese people in the new Chinatown remained the same as in the old Chinatown. The majority of Chinatown's residents were poorly-educated immigrants who made their livings through low-skill, manual labor or through restaurant-related work. In turn, the wealthy merchant families still wielded immense power in the area, with the Moys wielding the most.

Numerous important buildings and structures in Chinatown arose in the area during this early period. The Canal Street railroad bridge, built in 1914, remains a tall vertical structure in the backdrop of Chinatown. The Hung Mun building in Chicago was and is still inhabited by the Chicago branch of the Hung Mun Association. While it only occupied the building starting in the 1920s, the local branch of the association played an active role in the 1911 revolution that founded the Chinese Republic. The Won Kow Building was built from 1926 to 1927 by the same architects that designed the On Leong Merchant Association Building. Unsurprisingly, it shares many of the same design characteristics as the former building, and it has since housed a restaurant that is the oldest in Chinatown. Finally, again reflecting the prominence of the Moy clan, the Moy Association Building still stands as one of the more impressive and beautiful buildings in Chinatown. It was originally built in 1928 and added onto in 1932. Like the On Leong Merchant Association Building and the Won Kow Building, the Moy Association building was designed by Michaelsen and Rognstad.

=== Post–World War II Chinatown ===
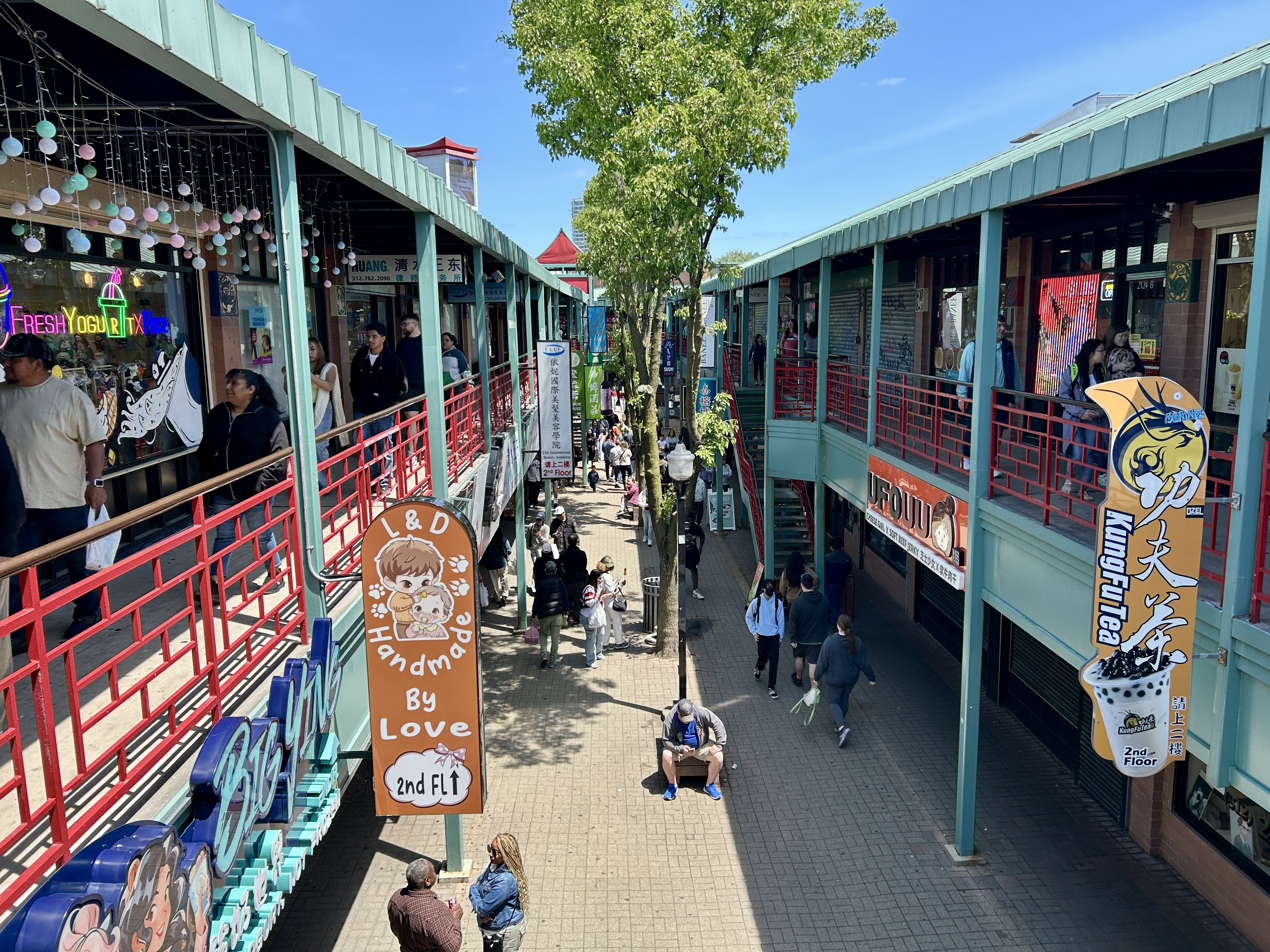
Shops at Chinatown Square (2025)

Before World War II, Chicago's Chinatown remained a largely insulated enclave, with little of the racial mixing seen in cities such as New York City. The residents only grew closer together from the war as they collectively united against fascism. However, this unity increasingly became frayed in the years that followed. The influx of refugees and educated Chinese people into Chicago dramatically changed the importance of Chinatown to Chicago's Chinese residents. Rather than living and working in Chinatown, many newcomers decided to move to the suburbs. Further, as Chinese immigration became more accepted after the passing of the Immigration and Nationality Act of 1965, young, educated Chinese Americans began to take a greater role in Chinatown, clashing with the old family associations.

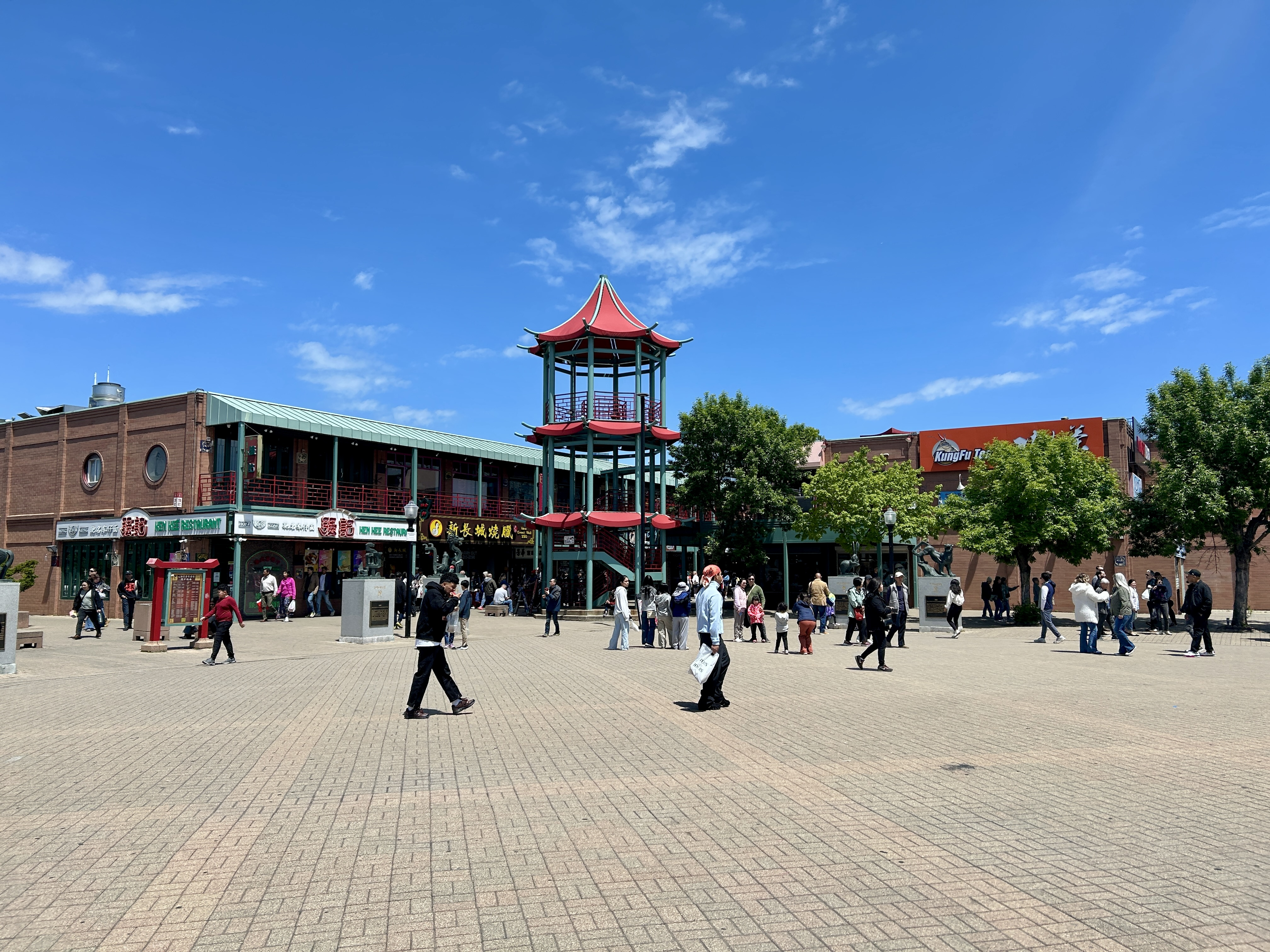
Chinatown Square plaza (2025)

To integrate Chinatown with the city to a greater extent, the Chinatown Gate was built in 1975, encouraging visitors to learn more about the neighborhood and Chinese culture and history more broadly. During the late 1980s, a group of Chinatown business leaders bought 32 acres (130,000 m^{2}) of property north of Archer Avenue from the Santa Fe Railway and built Chinatown Square, a two-level mall consisting of restaurants, beauty salons and law offices, flanked by 21 new townhouses. Additional residential construction, such as the Santa Fe Gardens, a 600-unit village of townhouses, condominiums and single-family homes was developed on formerly industrial land to the north. Perhaps the most outstanding feature of the new addition was the creation of Ping Tom Memorial Park in 1999; located on the bank of the Chicago River, the park features a Chinese-style pavilion that many consider to be the most beautiful in the Midwest.

== Commerce ==
Chinatown, Chicago
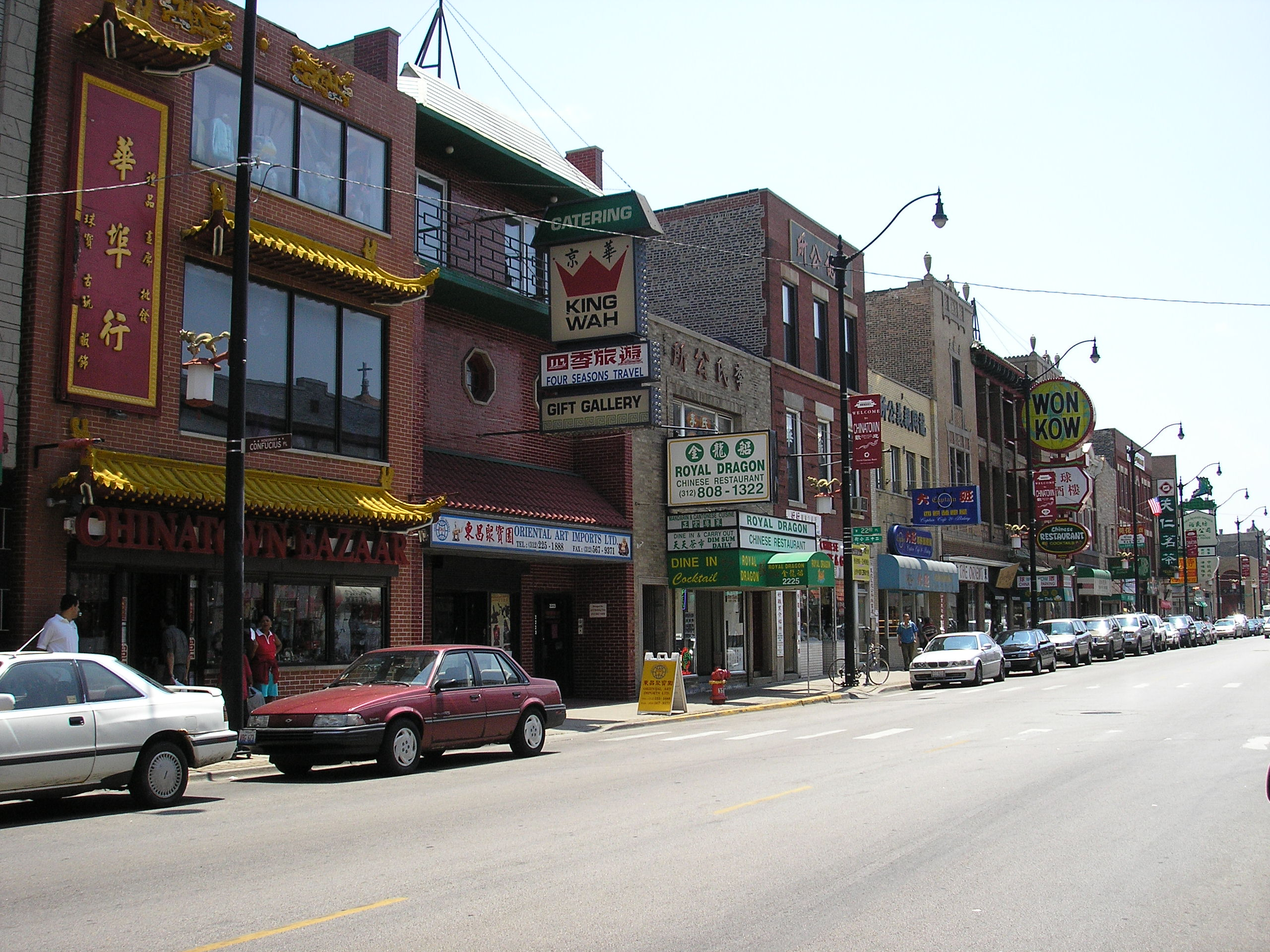
- Wentworth Avenue looking south (2006)
- Traditional Chinese: 芝加哥華埠
- Simplified Chinese: 芝加哥华埠
Transcriptions
Standard Mandarin
- Hanyu Pinyin: Zhījiāgē Huá Bù
- Gwoyeu Romatzyh: Jyjiage Hwabuh
- Wade–Giles: Chih^{1}chia^{1}ke^{1} Hua^{2} Pu^{4}
- Tongyong Pinyin: Jhihjiage Húa Bù
- Yale Romanization: Jrjyake Hwabu
- IPA: [ʈʂɻ̩́tɕjákɤ́ xwǎ pû]
Yue: Cantonese
- Jyutping: Zi1gaa1go1 Waa4 Fau6
- IPA: Cantonese pronunciation: [tɕíːkáːkɔ̂ː wȁːfɐ̀u]
Southern Min
- Hokkien POJ: Chi-cha-ko Hôa-bú

Chicago's Chinatown is home to a number of banks, Chinese restaurants, gift shops, grocery stores, Chinese medicine stores, as well as a number of services that cater to people interested in Chinese culture, including those speaking varieties of Chinese, especially Cantonese. It is a community hub for Chinese people in the Chicago metropolitan area, a business center for Chinese people in the Midwest, as well as a popular destination for tourists and locals alike.

== Demographics ==
In 1990, about 10,000 Chinese people lived in Chinatown's business district and the area south of 26th Street; several Italian Americans still remained in the neighborhood.

As of 2013, about 8,000 people lived within Chinatown itself, and 90% were ethnic Chinese. As of that year, many of the residents were elderly.

In 2010, about 16,325 people lived within Chinatown.

As opposed to Chinatown communities in major cities like New York and San Francisco, which have suffered from gentrification, Chicago's Chinatown has maintained healthy growth, with the 60608, 60609, and 60616 ZIP Codes continually seeing increases in the population of residents identifying as Asian alone.

== Landmarks and attractions ==
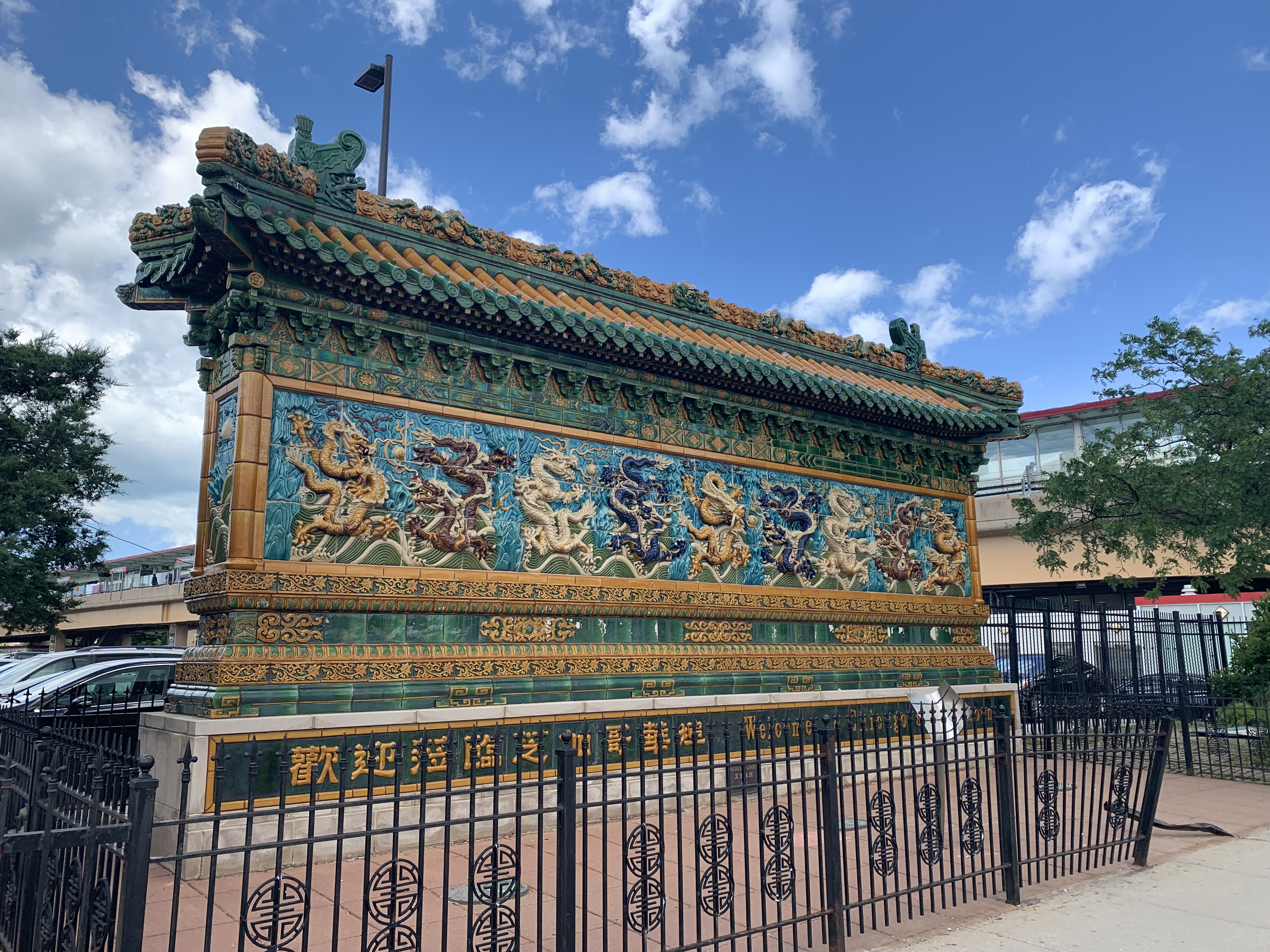
Nine-Dragon Wall (2019)

- Chinatown Mural, a mural showing the history of Chinese immigrants in United States
- Chinatown Square, Shopping area opened in 1993. Decorated with sculptures of animals in the Chinese zodiac
- Wentworth Avenue, with shopping, restaurants, and landmarks, including the Chinatown Gate, which was designed by Peter Fung and spans Wentworth Avenue at the intersection of Cermak Road
- Pui Tak Center was designated a Chicago Landmark on December 1, 1993. It was the On Leong Merchants Association Building.
- Chinese American Museum of Chicago, conducts research and exhibits objects and pictures relating to the history of Chinese people in the American Midwest. The museum experienced a fire on September 19, 2008, and was temporarily closed. Thanks to strong community support, it reopened in the fall of 2010 with improved facilities.
- Ping Tom Memorial Park, Opened in 1999 with Chinese gardens on the northern edge of Chinatown along the Chicago River
- Chicago Fire Department Engine 8 Company firehouse, firehouse used in the 1991 Ron Howard film Backdraft
- Moy Association Building, built in 1928 and added onto in 1932.
- Sun Yat-Sen Park
- Chinese American Veterans Memorial

== Government and infrastructure ==
The United States Postal Service operates the Chinatown Post Office at 2345 South Wentworth Avenue.

== Education ==
=== Primary and secondary schools ===
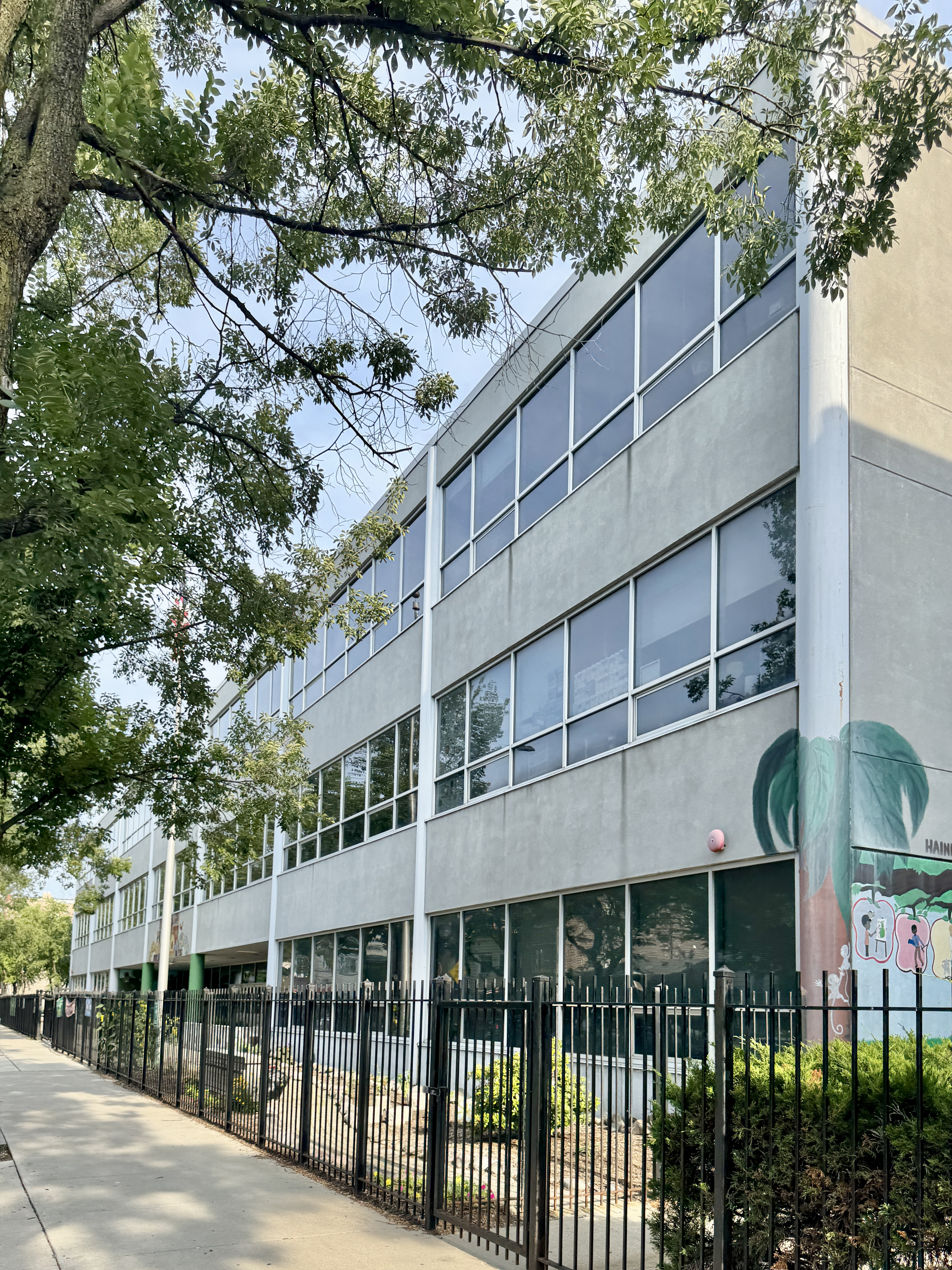
John C. Haines School

Residents are zoned to schools in the Chicago Public Schools including John C. Haines School (興氏學校; 兴氏学校; Xīngshì Xuéxiào; hing1 si6 hok6 haau6) and Phillips Academy High School.

Haines, which had its current facility built in 1994, serves students from Chinatown and formerly from the Harold L. Ickes Homes; students from the latter used a tunnel to get to school. As of 2001 70% of the students were Asian while 28% were black; most residents of Ickes were black. Connie Laureman of the Chicago Tribune stated that Haines, in 1990, was "crowded and dilapidated". Until Gandy Easton became principal in 1990, the school had de facto racial segregation as ethnic Chinese students stayed in a bilingual program while black students took regular classes. Easton combined the two levels together, despite protests from ethnic Chinese parents. By 2001 school authorities instituted programs to combat racism and ensure Chinese and black students socialized with one another.

The Roman Catholic Archdiocese of Chicago supports the St. Therese Chinese Catholic School (traditional Chinese: 聖德力天主教學校; simplified Chinese: 圣德力天主教学校; pinyin: Shèng Délì Tiānzhǔjiào Xuéxiào), a K-8 private Catholic school, which has one of its two campuses in Chinatown. It was established in 1941. In 1990, almost all of the students were ethnic Chinese.

The Pui Tak Christian School (培德基督教學校; 培德基督教学校; pui4 dak1 gei1 duk1 gaau3 hok6 haau6; Péidé Jīdūjiào Xuéxiào) is a private pre-kindergarten to 8th grade school.

=== Public libraries ===
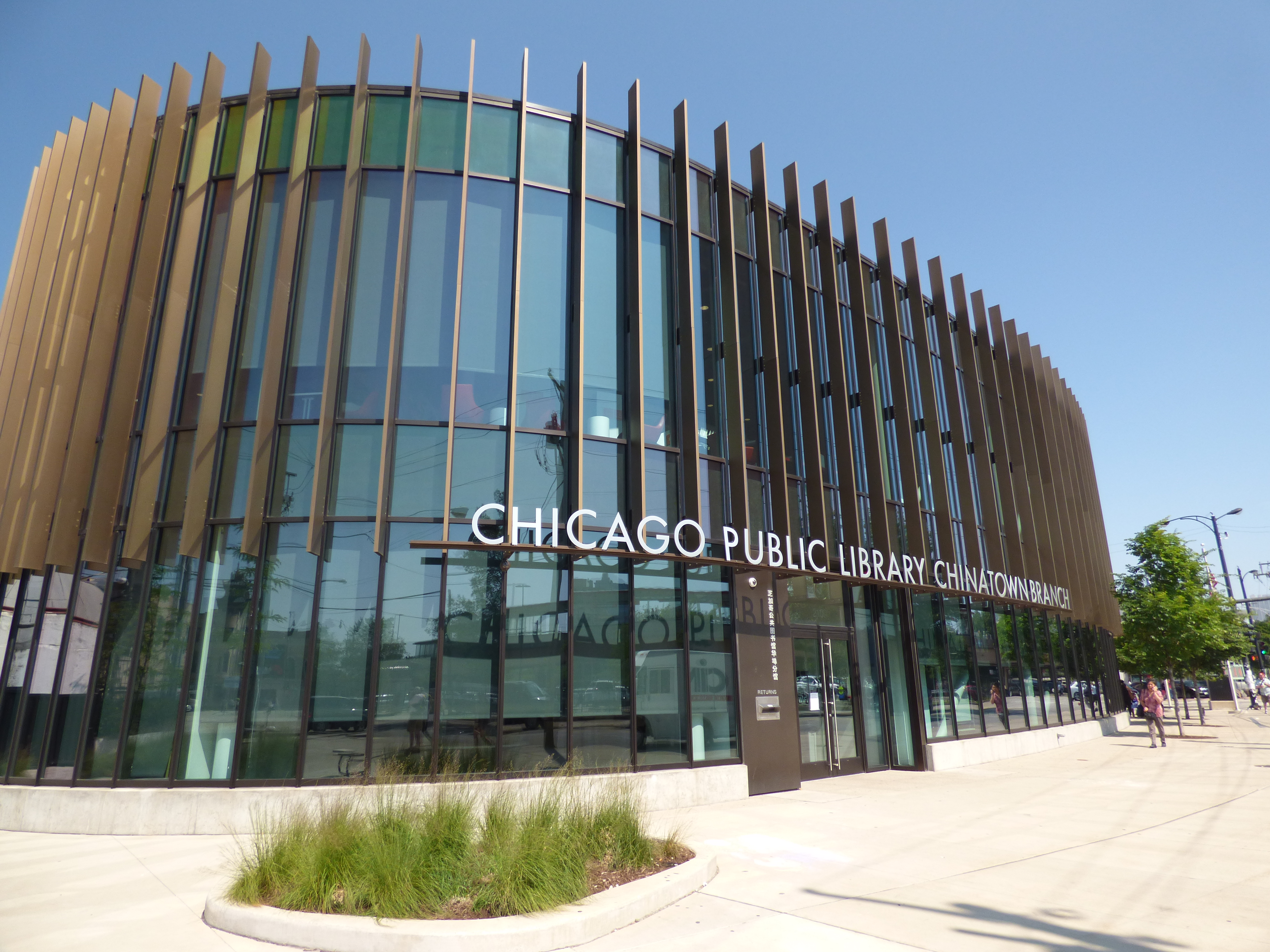
Chinatown Branch of the Chicago Public Library (2018)

The Chicago Public Library operates the Chinatown Branch at 2100 South Wentworth Avenue.

== Culture ==
A 1942 article from the Chicago Tribune stated that the strong family ties among the residents of Chinatown meant that there was little juvenile delinquency present in the community.

Chicago Chinatown celebrates the founding of the Republic of China with the Double Ten Parade, which includes lion dances and much display of the flag of Taiwan.

Chicago Chinatown also celebrates the National Day of the People's Republic of China with members of the PRC consulate.

== Transportation ==
The Dan Ryan Expressway and the Stevenson Expressway intersect over the southside of Chinatown. The Stevenson's exit 293A (northbound exit and southbound entrances) gives Chinatown commuters immediate access to the expressways via Cermak Road, only one block east of Wentworth Avenue. There is metered street parking throughout the area, as well as two pay parking lots located on Wentworth Avenue.

Several forms of public transportation are also available in Chinatown. The Chicago Transit Authority operates both an elevated train and four bus routes that service the area. The Red Line, the CTA's busiest transit route, stops 24/7 at the Cermak–Chinatown station located in the heart of Chinatown near the corner of Cermak Road and Wentworth Avenue. Running north–south, the #24 bus route runs on Wentworth Avenue on the eastside of Chinatown, while the #44 route runs on Canal Street on the westside. The #21 runs east–west on Cermak Road, and the #62 runs southwest–northeast on Archer Avenue. There is a taxicab stand on Wentworth Avenue, and a water taxi service also runs along the Chicago River from Michigan Avenue to Ping Tom Memorial Park in Chinatown during the summer months.

== Annual events ==
- Chinatown 5K
- Lunar New Year Parade
- Dragon Boat Races
- Chinatown Summer Fair
- Chicago Chinatown Chamber of Commerce Tours

== See also ==
- History of Chinese Americans in Chicago
