= Chinese American Veterans Memorial =

Monument and Chinatown, Chicago, Illinois, U.S.

- The memorial in 2026
- Interactive map of Chinese American Veterans Memorial
- Location: Chicago, Illinois, U.S.
- Coordinates: 41°51′9″N 87°38′6″W

The Chinese American Veterans Memorial is a veterans memorial in Chicago's Chinatown neighborhood, in the U.S. state of Illinois. The granite monument is located at the southwest corner of the intersection of Archer and Princeton Avenues. It commemorates Chinese and American veterans who served and died in the armed forces.

== See also ==
- History of Chinese Americans in Chicago
