= Chinatown Branch =

Chicago Public Library branch, Illinois, U.S.

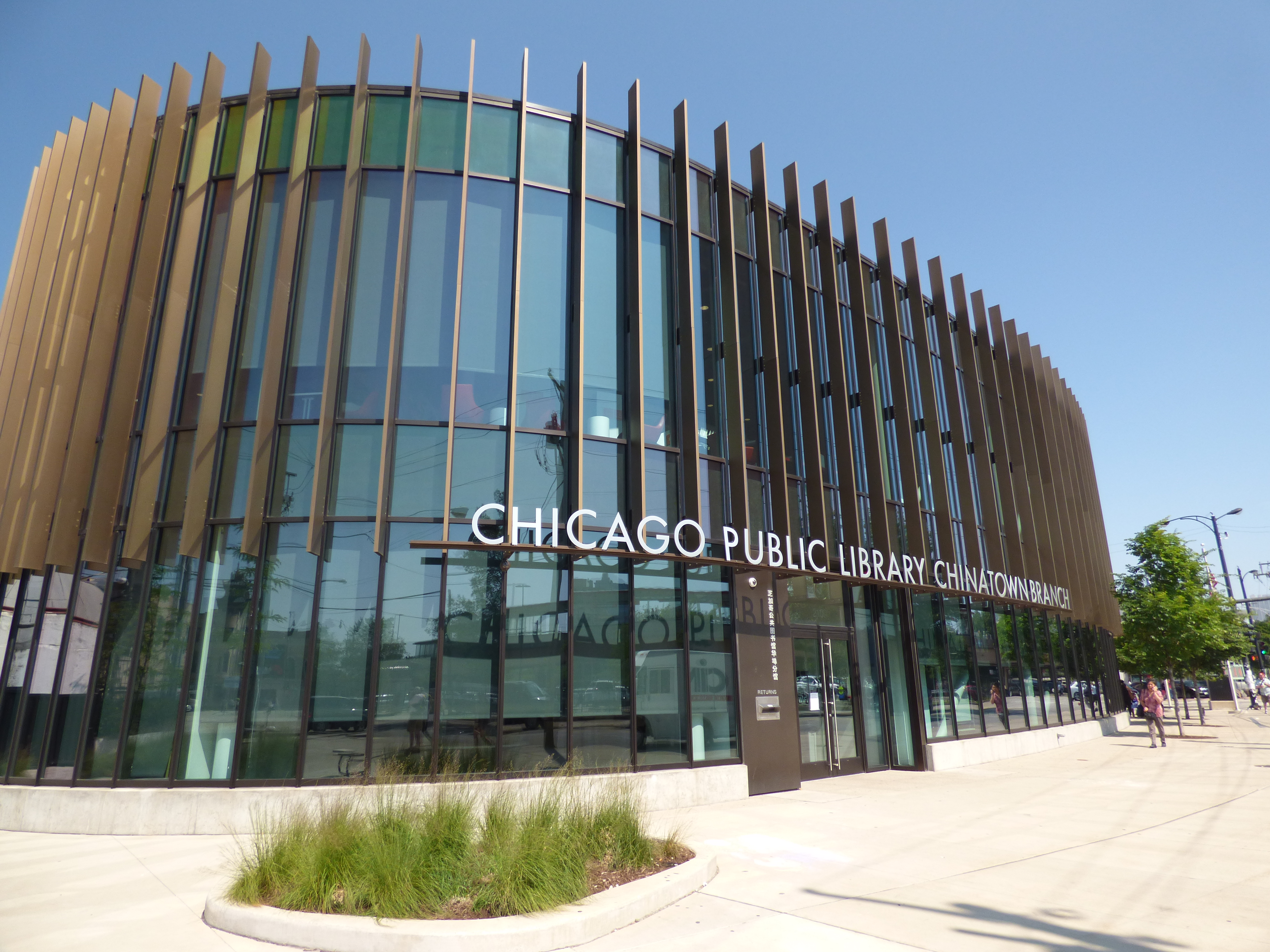
- The building's exterior in 2018

General information
- Location: Chicago, Illinois, United States
- Coordinates: 41°51′14″N 87°37′56″W

Chinatown Branch
- Traditional Chinese: 芝加哥公共圖書館華埠分館
- Simplified Chinese: 芝加哥公共图书馆华埠分馆
Transcriptions
Standard Mandarin
- Hanyu Pinyin: Zhījiāgē Gōnggòng Túshūguǎn Huábù Fēn Guǎn

The Chinatown Branch is a branch of the Chicago Public Library in Chicago's Chinatown neighborhood, in the U.S. state of Illinois.

The 16,000-square-foot (1,500 m^{2}) building was designed by Skidmore, Owings & Merrill and completed in 2015. It cost $19 million to construct.

== Description ==
The library's interior, 2026

The library has Chinese-language materials, a mural, and views of Chicago's skyline. It has become a hub for seniors, according to the Medill School of Journalism. The building has a double-layer glass curtain.

== History ==
The library closed temporarily for repairs in 2024.

== Reception ==
In 2016, the branch received a Library Building Award from the American Institute of Architects and the American Library Association.
