= Chinatown Gate (Chicago) =

Paifang in Chicago, Illinois, U.S.

- The gate in 2023
- Location: Chicago, Illinois, U.S.
- Interactive map of Chinatown Gate
- Coordinates: 41.8526°N 87.632°W

The Chinatown Gate is a paifang installed in Chinatown, Chicago, Illinois, United States. It was designed by Peter Fung in 1975. It spans Wentworth Avenue and is modeled after a gate in Beijing. The gate was dedicated in November 1975.

== See also ==
- Chinese architecture
- History of Chinese Americans in Chicago
