= Pui Tak Center =

Building in Chicago, Illinois, US

Coordinates: 41°51′8.3″N 87°37′56″W

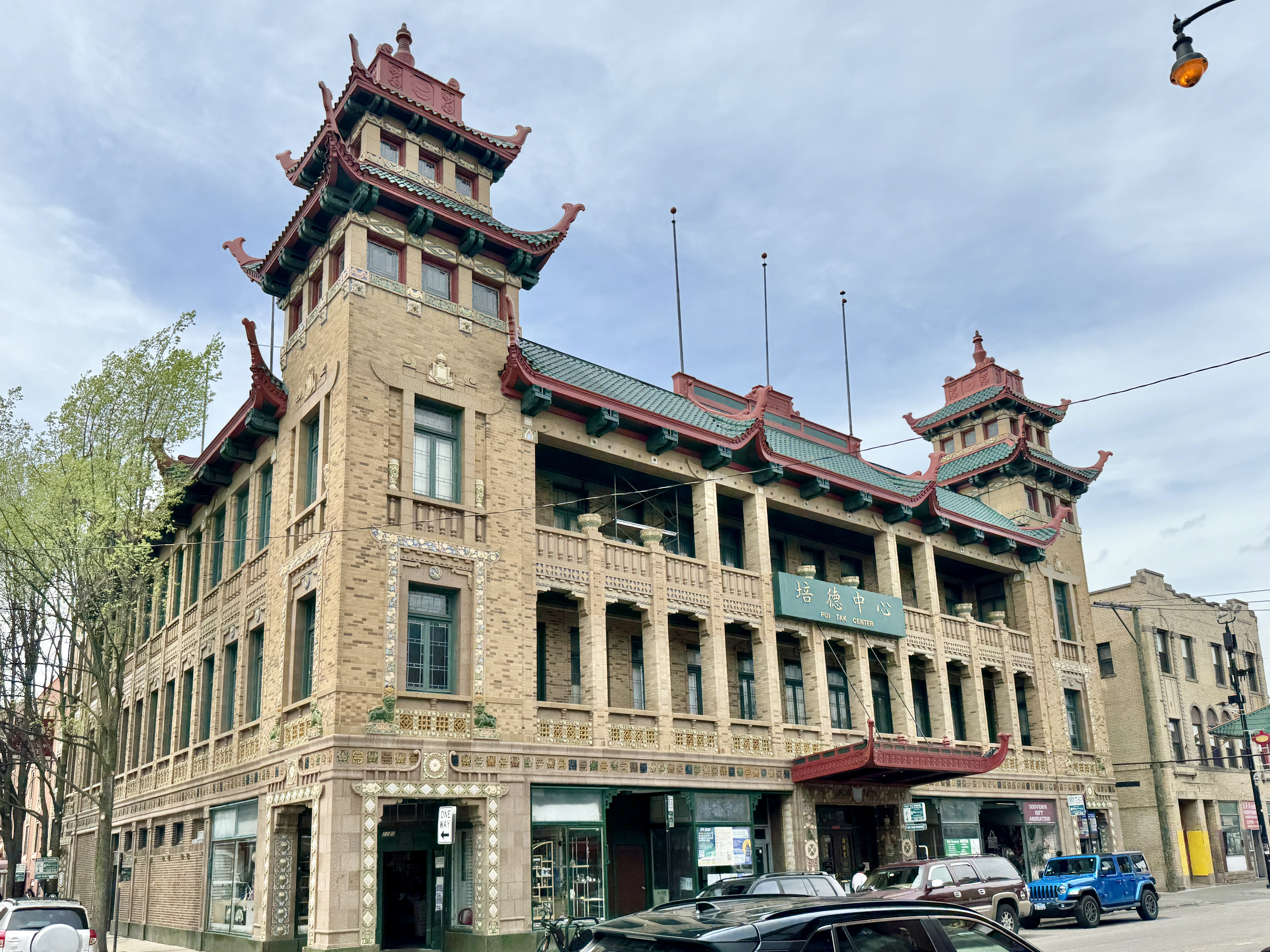
- Pui Tak Center
- Interactive map of the Pui Tak Center area
- Former names: On Leong Merchants Association Building

General information
- Architectural style: Orientalism
- Location: Chinatown, Chicago, 2216 S. Wentworth Avenue
- Current tenants: Various
- Construction started: 1926
- Completed: 1927
- Inaugurated: May 2, 1928
- Renovated: 1995 (interior); 2009–2010 (exterior)
- Cost: $1 million
- Renovation cost: $1 million (interior) $2 million (exterior, projected)
- Owner: Chinese Christian Union Church

Technical details
- Floor count: 3
- Floor area: 30,000 sq ft (2,800 m^{2})

Design and construction
- Architects: Christian S. Michaelsen; Sigurd A. Rognstad

Chicago Landmark
- Official name: On Leong Merchants Association Building
- Designated: December 1, 1993

U.S. National Register of Historic Places
- Official name: On Leong Merchants Association Building
- Designated: September 2, 2025

The Pui Tak Center (Chinese: 培德中心; Jyutping: pui4 dak1 zung1 sam1; Cantonese Yale: Pùihdāk Jūngsām; pinyin: Péidé Zhōngxīn; lit. 'cultivating virtue center'), formerly known as the On Leong Merchants Association Building, is a building located in Chicago's Chinatown. Designed by architects Christian S. Michaelsen and Sigurd A. Rognstad, the building was built for the On Leong Merchants Association and opened in 1928. The Association used it as an immigrant assistance center, and the building was informally referred to as Chinatown's "city hall". In 1988, the FBI and Chicago Police raided the building as part of a racketeering investigation. The US federal government seized the building that same year.

The building was purchased by the Chinese Christian Union Church (CCUC) for $1.4 million and renamed the Pui Tak Center in 1993. That same year, the On Leong Merchants Association Building was designated a Chicago landmark by the Commission on Chicago Landmarks. The CCUC spent $1 million raised from community donations to renovate and update the building's neglected interior. The Pui Tak Center now hosts various religious, community, and educational programs, such as English-as-a-Second-Language courses (ESL).

In 2007, the Pui Tak Center won a $100,000 grant from the Partners in Preservation, a program sponsored by American Express and the National Trust for Historic Preservation. In preparation for the restoration work, the structural and architectural engineering firm Wiss, Janney, Elstner Associates completed an evaluation of the building's eastern and southern facades, focusing on its terra cotta portions. Restoration work began in spring 2009 and was completed in early 2010. Fully restoring the building's exterior terra cotta pieces and clay roof tiles is the first step in a long-range $2 million repair plan. In 2025, the building became Chicago's Chinatown's first to be listed on the National Register of Historic Places.

== History ==
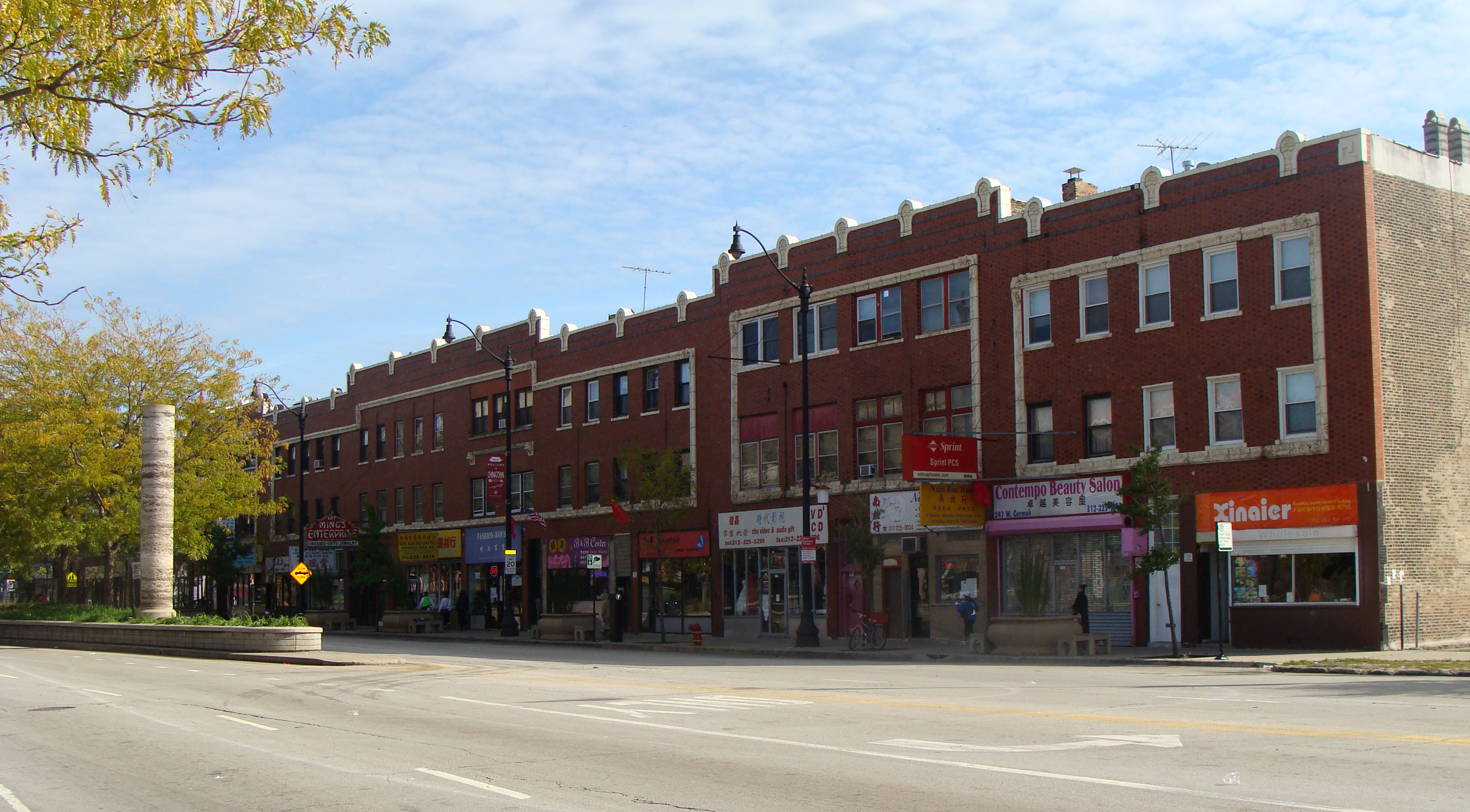
A building was first constructed for the On Leong Chinese Merchants Association along Cermak Avenue in 1912.

In 1912, Chinese businesses began relocating from the Loop to Chicago's South Side. Starting this trend, the On Leong Chinese Merchants Association appealed to deed-holder and former Illinois State's Attorney Jacob J. Kern to hire architect H. J. Swanson to design a building large enough to house 15 stores, 30 apartments and office space on the 200 block of West 22nd Street (now Cermak Road). Built in 1912 for $200,000, the building's design was typical of the period; however, it featured white tile trim adorned with Chinese dragons and a third floor balcony. The Association relocated to the building's third floor by 1914.

In the 1920s, Chinese community leaders secured approximately 50 ten-year leases on properties in the newly developing Chinatown. Jim Moy, director of the Association, then decided that a Chinese-style building should be constructed as a strong visual announcement of the Chinese community's new presence in the area. With no Chinese-born architects in Chicago at the time, Chicago-born Norse architects Christian S. Michaelsen and Sigurd A. Rognstad were asked to design the On Leong Merchants Association Building in the spring of 1926. Moy decided to employ the pair again after Michaelsen and Rognstad's firm built Moy's Peacock Inn in Uptown in 1920.

After studying texts on Chinese architecture, Michaelsen and Rognstad's final design was an example of Orientalism, a Western architect's interpretation of Chinese architectural forms. A good substitute for the liu li glazed ceramic found in traditional Chinese architecture, Rognstad designed exterior Teco sculptural accents, a type of terra cotta produced by Crystal Lake, Illinois's American Terra Cotta Company. When the building plans were announced in the Chicago Tribune on July 4, 1926, the building was called, "One of the most expensive and elaborate buildings ever erected in America by the Chinese". Construction began in 1926 and was completed a year later for the cost of $1 million.

When the building opened in 1928, the On Leong Merchants Association used it as an immigrant assistance center that housed various meeting halls, a school, a shrine, and the Association's offices. It was often informally referred to as Chinatown's "city hall". In 1941, the On Leong Association offered Reverend John T.S. Mao space in the building to open St. Therese Chinese Catholic School, a Catholic grade school. By the 1950s, the school had become overcrowded, but it remained in the building until construction of a new, devoted school building was completed in 1961.

=== From seizure to landmark ===
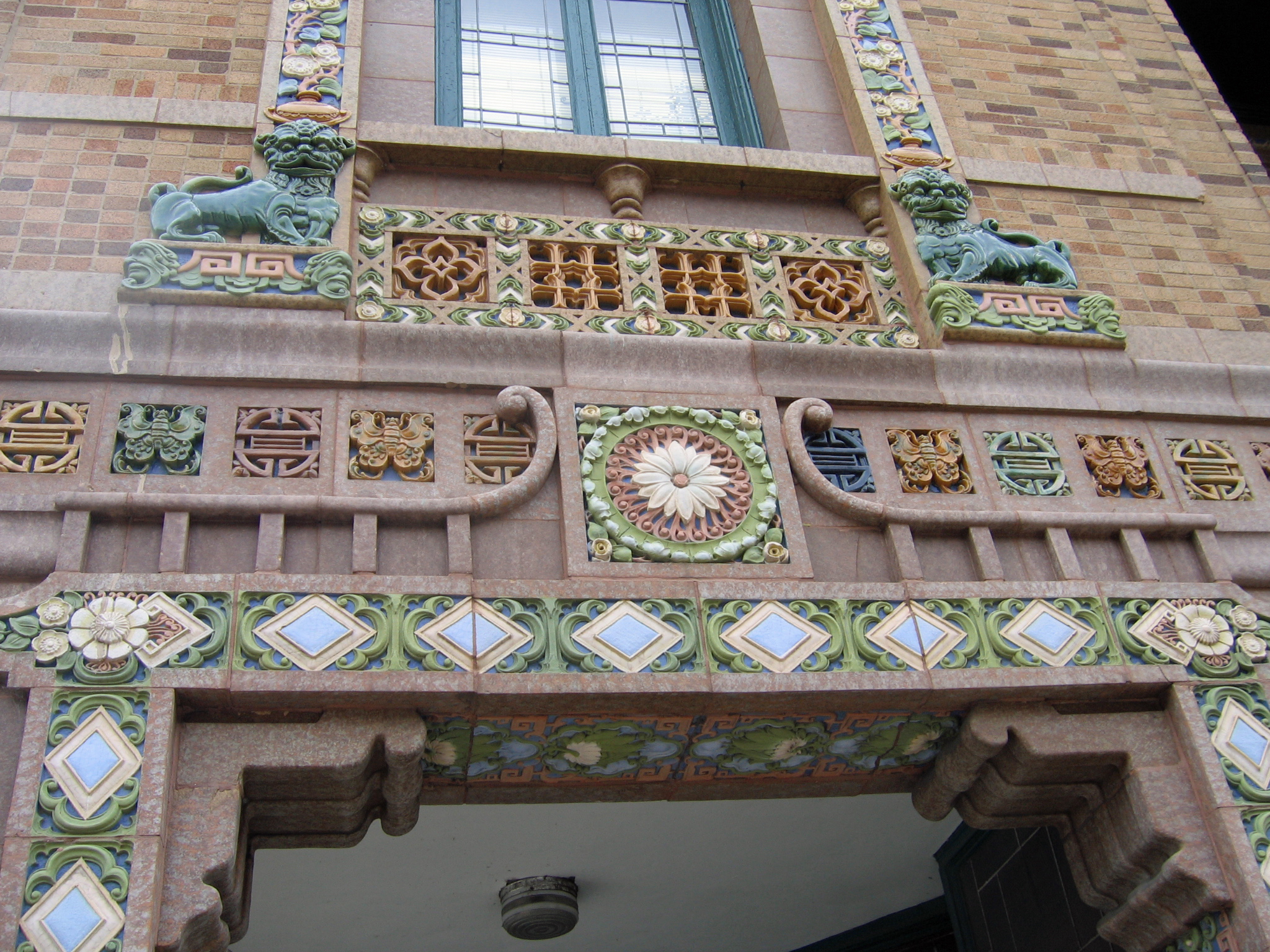
The building features exterior terra cotta accents, mimicking glazed ceramic found in traditional Chinese architecture.

In the mid-1960s, prosecutors began claiming the building was a national headquarters for a multimillion-dollar racketeering operation. On April 20, 1988, the FBI and Chicago police Internal Affairs Division investigators raided the On Leong Merchants Association Building, confiscated gambling paraphernalia from a casino hidden on the building's second floor and seized $350,000 from a vault. Assistant U.S. Attorney John J. Scully asserted that the Association had collected $6 million in illegal gambling profits between 1966 and 1988. The building was seized by the US federal government two months later under federal racketeering statutes. Other than several first-floor shops, the building sat empty for almost five years. Rooms on the upper floors fell into disrepair, with paint peeling and faded ornamentation in pieces on the floor.

After a unanimous voice vote by a City Council committee, the Commission on Chicago Landmarks designated the On Leong Merchants Association Building as a Chicago Landmark on December 1, 1993, the only such landmark in Chinatown. It has been described as Chicago’s "most significant symbol of the cultural heritage of the Chinese". That same year, the Chinese Christian Union Church (CCUC) bought the building from the government for $1.4 million. The CCUC now uses the newly named Pui Tak Center to host religious, community, and educational programs such as family literacy classes, music programs, computer courses, and youth activities, with English-as-a-Second-Language courses (ESL) being the Center's largest program. Recent Chinese immigrants can also visit the Center for assistance with everyday needs. Serving approximately 2,500 new immigrants annually, the Center's annual $1.5 million operating budget is partially funded by state and local government grants and private donations.

With many Chinatowns in the US at risk because of rising property prices and redevelopment, the CCUC applied for the building to be listed on the National Register of Historic Places (NRHP) in 2025 to further secure its preservation. The program committee of the Commission on Chicago Landmarks voted to support the building's inclusion on the National Register in May and it was officially listed on September 2. It became the first NRHP listing in Chicago's Chinatown.

== Renovation and restoration ==
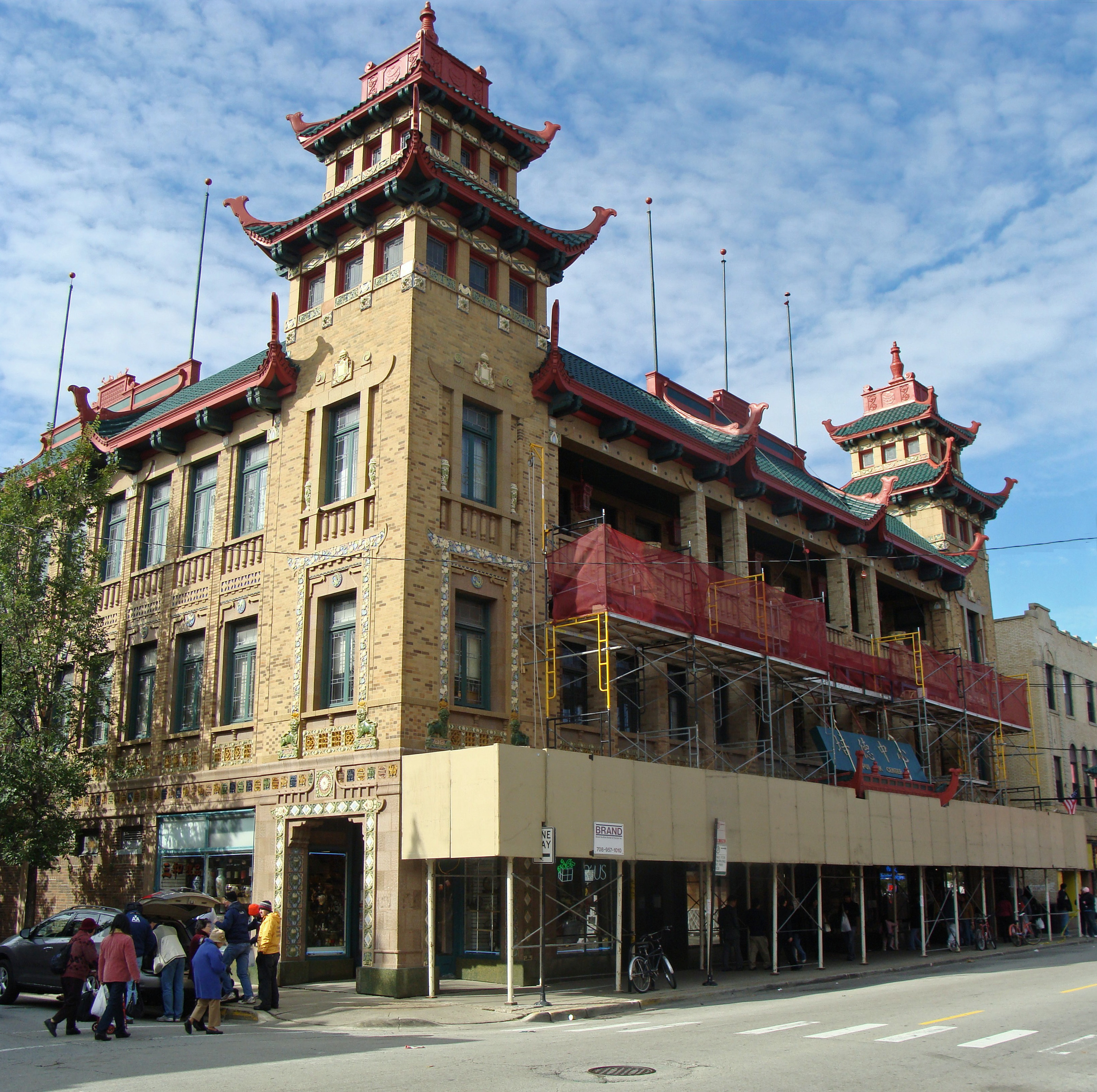
Scaffolding was erected along the building's eastern facade during restoration work in 2009.

After purchasing the building in 1993, the Chinese Christian Union Church spent $1 million raised from community donations to make extensive alterations to the building's interior, which suffered from peeling paint, falling plaster, and poor lighting. The On Leong Merchants Association's former vault was converted into a closet, and the building's heating and water systems underwent major renovations and replacement. Renovations were completed in 1995, and the CCUC opened the building in November.

In November 2007, the Pui Tak Center won a $100,000 grant from the Partners in Preservation, a program sponsored by American Express and the National Trust for Historic Preservation. Spreading the word via e-mail, Facebook, and church sermons, the building led the five-week-long online contest from the start and ultimately received 14% of the vote. It received more votes than any of the other 24 historic Chicago sites participating in the contest, including the Robie House, the Chicago Cultural Center, and Unity Temple.

In preparation for the restoration work, the structural and architectural engineering firm Wiss, Janney, Elstner Associates completed an evaluation of the building's eastern and southern facades, focusing on its terra cotta portions. By using ultrasonic testing, engineers were able to evaluate the state of the terra cotta without further damaging the pieces. Severely cracked or damaged pieces were partially removed and a report was written from these findings. This report provided recommendations for the masonry facade and terra cotta repair work. Restoration work began in spring 2009 and is scheduled for completion in early 2010. All of the damaged terra cotta elements have been replaced on the south tower and parapet, and scaffolding has been erected on building's eastern facade in preparation for further restoration work. Fully restoring the building's exterior terra cotta pieces and clay roof tiles is the first step in a long-range $2 million repair plan.
