= Canal dos Patos (Macau) =

Canal separating Macau and Zhuhai

Chinese name
- Traditional Chinese: 鴨涌河
- Simplified Chinese: 鸭涌河
Transcriptions

Portuguese name
- Portuguese: Canal dos Patos

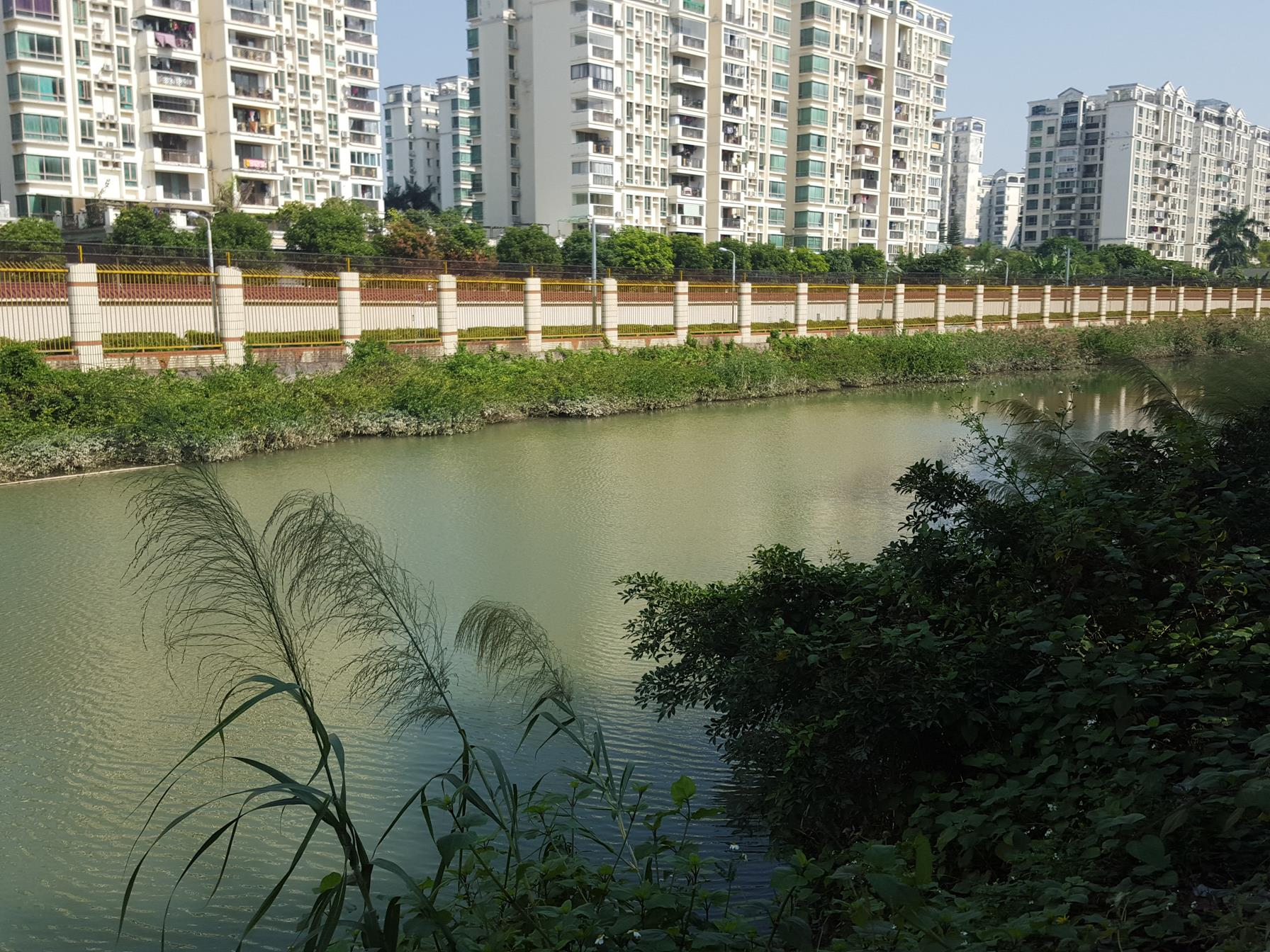
Canal dos Patos section

Canal dos Patos (Chinese: 鴨涌河) is a short canal separating Zhuhai and Macau.

The canal begins at the Barrier Gate and flows westwards out into the Inner Harbour. The canal was created when Inner Harbour in the north west end of Macau Peninsula was filled in.

From the Inner Harbour to CEM Canal do Patos Power Substation (located just west of Dr. Sun Yat Sen Municipal Park) the canal is still visible. This section of the canal is lined with mainly with residential buildings on the south side of street.

There is no access to the waterway and fencing is found along the canal from the bridge at Cross Border Industrial Zone (restricted access for commercial vehicles to and from Macau to China) to Barrier Gate. Sections near the Inner Harbour has no fencing on the Macau side but flanked by a man-made embankment.

== Attractions ==
The canal passes by:

- Macau Wholesale Market (Sociedade do Mercado Abastecedor de Macau Nam Yue – 澳門批發市場)
- CEM
- Dr. Sun Yat Sen Municipal Park
- Ilha Verde
