= History of Chinese Americans in Chicago =

The Chicago metropolitan area has an ethnic Chinese population. While historically small in comparison to populations on the coasts, the community is rapidly expanding. As of 2023, there are 78,547 Chinese Americans who live in Chicago, comprising 2.9% of the city's population, along with over 150,000 Chinese in the greater Chicago area - making Chicago's Chinese community the 8th largest among US metropolitan areas. This population includes native-born Chinese as well as immigrants from Mainland China, Taiwan, Hong Kong and Southeast Asia, and also racially mixed Chinese.

== History ==
In 1869 the first transcontinental railway was completed. By that time the first Chinese arrived in Chicago. Early immigrants from China to Chicago came from the lower classes and lower middle classes, and were characteristically "urban" Chinese as opposed to miners and farmers. The earliest immigrants were Cantonese. In 1874 the Chinese managed one tea shop and 18 laundry businesses in central Chicago. This initial concentration was centered along the stretch of Clark Street between Van Buren and Harrison Streets in the present-day South Loop: in 1890, 25% of the city's 600 Chinese residents lived on this stretch. By 1889, a Tribune reporter enumerated eight grocery stores, two drug stores, two butchers' shops, two barber shops, and one cigar factory among the Chinese businesses on Clark and nearby streets. Today, the pagoda design of the sign formerly belonging to the Shanghai Restaurant, which was located in the Yukon Building on Clark Street, is the only remaining vestige of the original Chinatown community.

The 1882 Chinese Exclusion Act passed by the U.S. Congress restricted Chinese immigration and restricted freedom of travel for existing Chinese, forcing those in Chicago to stay put. At that time some Chinese in Chicago were illegal immigrants. The Chinese Inspector of the Department of Labor deported illegal immigrants who were discovered. According to the 1900 U.S. Census, there were 1,462 Chinese in the city. Chuimei Ho and Soo Lon Moy of the Chinatown Museum Foundation wrote that "there must have been others who avoided government notice."

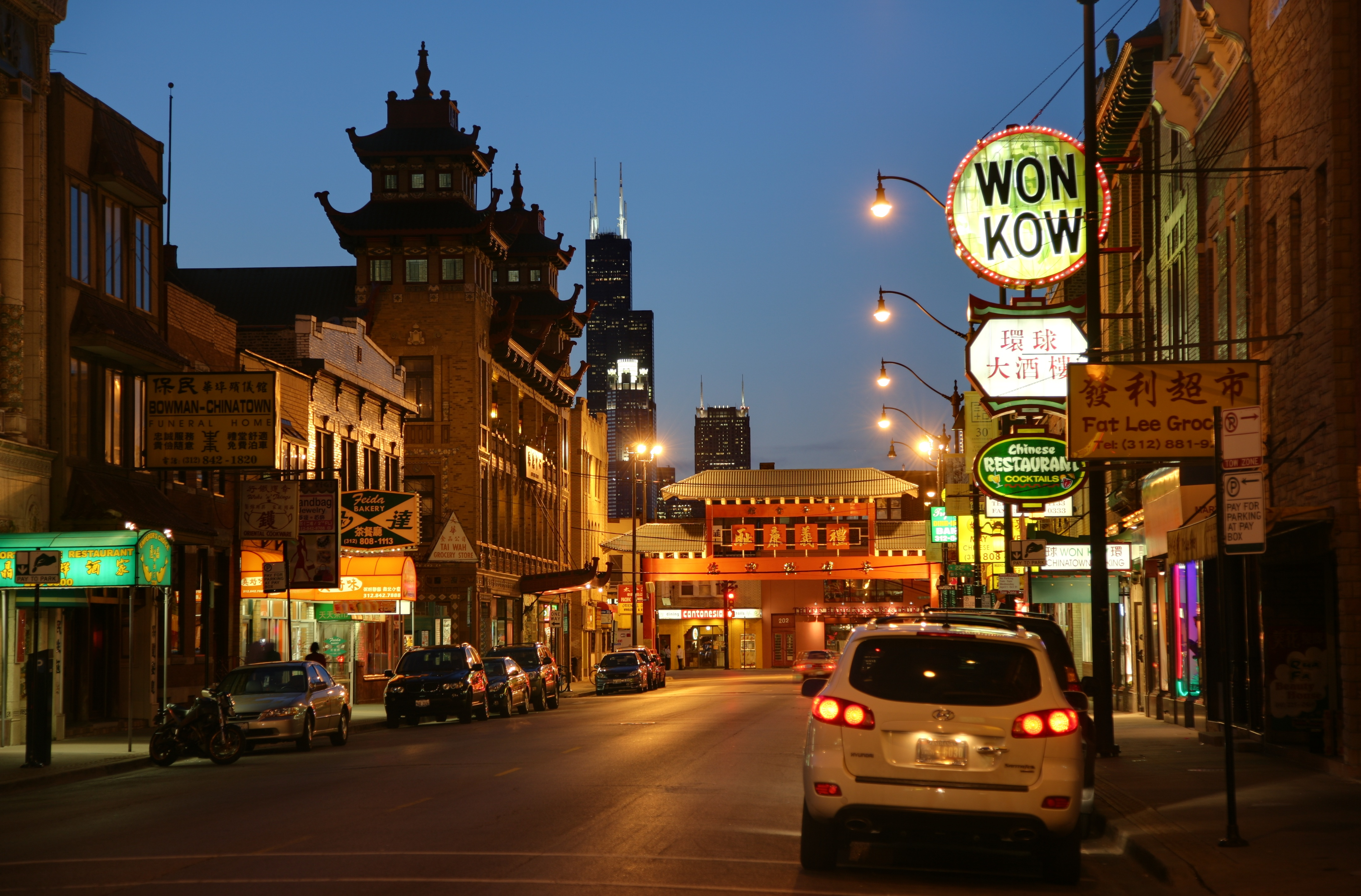
Wentworth Avenue in Chinatown, Chicago

In the late 19th and early 20th centuries, the tremendous growth of Chicago created immense pressures on the South Loop Chinatown, along with increased discrimination. By 1910, estimates showed that around half of the original Chinatown residents had relocated south to Armour Square, near Cermak and Wentworth, many in search of better living conditions and lower rents. The On Leong Merchants Association Building was erected in 1928. Its bold statement of Chinese presence played an instrumental role in cementing the development of Chinatown culturally and visually. At this time the neighborhood still hosted a large Italian-American community, which is still noticeable today, albeit in diminished numbers. Symbolic of this transition, as its Italian congregation dwindled and the number of Chinese Catholic worshipers grew, the Santa Maria Incoronata Church was passed onto the St. Therese Chinese Mission in 1963. Armour Square remains the nucleus of Chicago's Chinese community today.

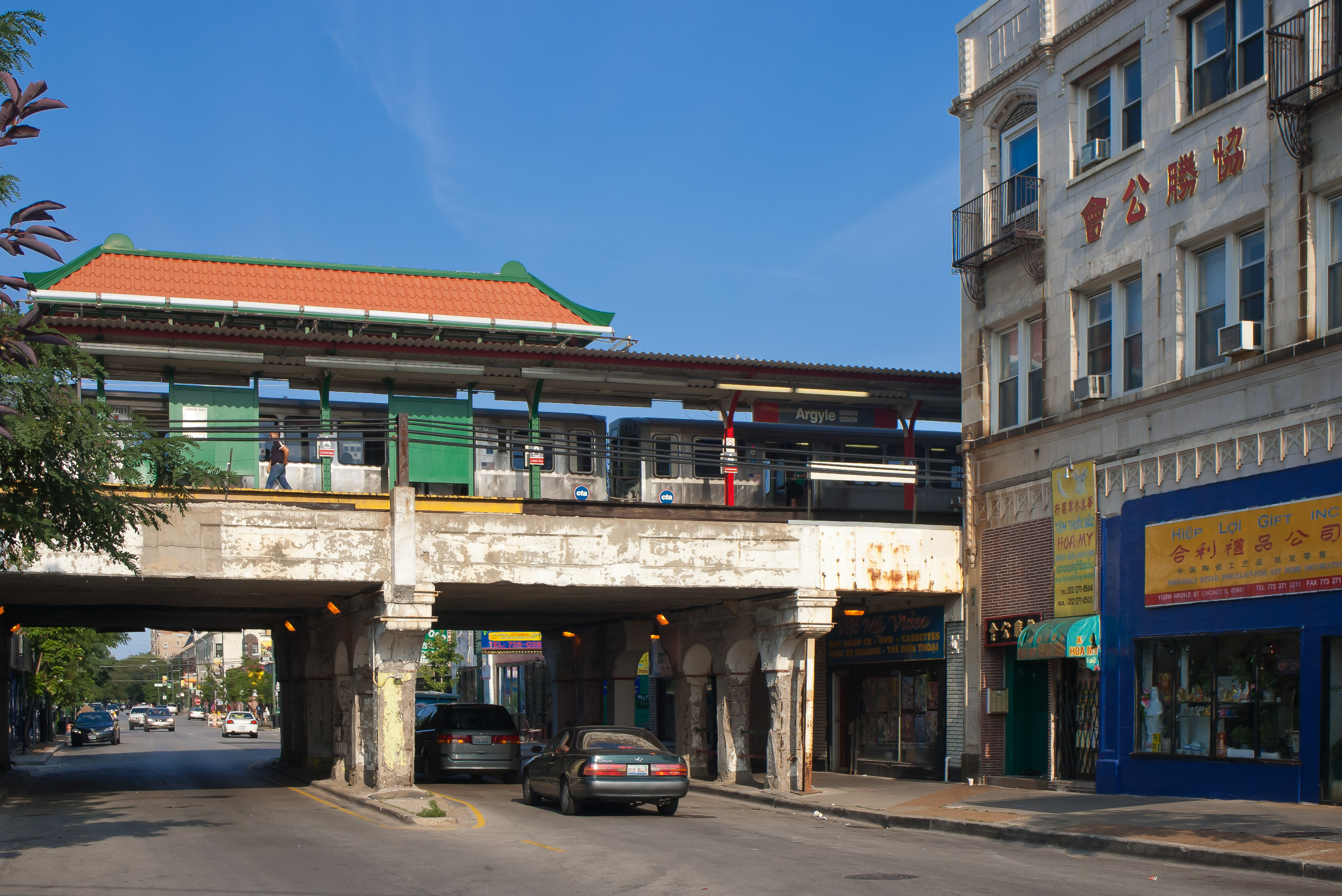
Argyle Street on Chicago's North Side. Originally intended to serve as a satellite Chinatown, the neighborhood developed as an ethnically diverse Southeast Asian enclave following the Fall of Saigon.

Some Chinese immigration began after the Chinese exclusion laws were repealed in 1943. During the 1950s the Chinese population grew from 3,000 to 6,000. Taiwanese and Hong Kong immigrants settled in Chicago in the 1950s and 1960s. After the People's Republic of China was established in 1949, a new wave of immigrants from the mainland came in the 1950s. The Mandarin-speaking people settled throughout Chicago and the suburbs instead of clustering in the Chinatown area. The 1965 Immigration Act further increased Chinese settlement, with a new wave coming from Mainland China.

By 1970 there were 12,000 Chinese in Chicago. A decade earlier, Chinese-American businessman and restaurateur Jimmy Wong spearheaded an unsuccessful effort to create a new Chinatown on Argyle Street in the city's Uptown neighborhood. However, Wong's mission of building a new community on the North Side was later passed onto businessman Charlie Soo, who convinced the city to renovate the derelict Argyle Red line stop and paint it in a traditional red-and-green color scheme. The initial period of redevelopment on Argyle Street coincided with the Fall of Saigon in the 1970s, bringing a more diverse demographic - including both ethnic Chinese and other immigrants from southeast Asia - to the neighborhood than originally envisioned. In 1986, the New York Times commented that the new "Little Saigon" had turned the formerly decrepit neighborhood into "an exotic pocket of restaurants and shops with an Indochina flavor," remarking that "[just] Four years ago Argyle Street... resembled a ghost town after dark. Its commercial life was dominated by pimps, prostitutes, and drug pushers who assembled on unlit, crumbling sidewalks to ply their trades."

According to the 1990 U.S. census there were over 23,000 Chinese in the city of Chicago. In the 2000 U.S. census there were almost 74,000 Chinese in the Chicago metropolitan area, with 34,000 of them in the City of Chicago. This number has since increased to over 124,265 residents of Chinese ancestry alone and 151,260 residents with Chinese ancestry or in any combination in the broader metropolitan area. Of these, 67,480 Chinese alone and 78,547 Chinese alone or in combination live within the city of Chicago, indicating that the community is evenly split between the city and the suburbs.

== Demographics ==
As of 1990 there were about 60,000 ethnic Chinese in the Chicago metropolitan area; of them, about 10,000 Chinese lived in Chinatown's business district and the area south of 26th Street.

As of 1995 almost 35,000 Chinese lived in Chicago, and 10,000 Chinese Americans lived in the area holding the Chinatown. The origins of ethnic Chinese Chicagoans include native-born Chinese as well as immigrants from Mainland China, Taiwan, Hong Kong and Southeast Asia, and also racially mixed Chinese. Around 1995 many new immigrants were from agricultural and blue collar working classes and from better educated professional classes.

As of 2013 90% of the residents of Chinatown were ethnic Chinese.

The Chinese community within the city of Chicago is heavily centralized, with the mean center of the Chinese population lying just 2.8 km from Downtown, as compared with Indians (7.4 km), Filipinos, (10.4 km), and Vietnamese (11.7 km). Over the past few decades, the Chinatown community has been extending to the southwest, following Archer Avenue into Bridgeport, McKinley Park, and Brighton Park, all of which now have significant concentrations.

Among legacy urban Chinatowns, Chicago's Chinatown is unique in that its population is growing. Some observers attribute this to the neighborhood's distance from the financial district, which reduces the gentrification pressures felt by communities in San Francisco and New York; while also lauding the neighborhood's tight-knit social network and city infrastructure investments, such as the new Skidmore, Owings, and Merrill-constructed Chinatown branch of the Chicago Public Library, which was completed in 2015.

Chinese-Americans in Chicago experience high levels of income and educational attainment relative to the national average. As of 2023, the median income of Chinese American households in the Chicago area was $91,061, exceeding the median US household income by approximately 13%. Additionally, 62% of Chinese over the age of 25 reported having a bachelor's degree or higher. Chinese Chicagoans are employed in diverse industries, with the largest portion working in education and health services (25.4%), followed by professional, scientific, and technical services (14.9%), finance, insurance, and real estate (12.5%), and arts, entertainment, and recreation (12.5%). The metropolitan area continues to see robust Chinese immigration, with 36% of the roughly 90,000 foreign-born Chinese in the Chicago area having arrived since 2010.

== Institutions ==
The Chinese American Museum of Chicago is in Chinatown. Chinese American Service League is also in Chinatown, Chicago. The Pui Tak Center on Wentworth is a church-based community center serving the greater Chinatown community. One of the oldest Chinese organizations in Chicago, the Chinese Consolidated Benevolent Association (Chinese Community Center) was first established in the 1880s in the historic Chinatown neighborhood centered around Van Buren and Clark, with the goal of uniting the overseas Chinese diaspora, promoting welfare, and bringing the community together through services and events.

The Zhou B Art Center in Bridgeport was founded by the internationally acclaimed art duo, the Zhou Brothers, and serves as a site of exchange between local artists and the global community while promoting the convergence of contemporary Eastern and Western art.

== Media ==
As of 1995 Chicago had four daily Chinese newspapers. Chinese-Americans who were bilingual in Chinese and English or who knew English but did not know Chinese had a tendency to read English-language American newspapers. In 1995 there were no English-language Chinese-American newspapers that focus on Chinese-American issues in the Chicago area.

In 1983 a Mandarin-language television program opened on Channel 26. In 1989 a Chinese radio station named Global Communication was established.

== Education ==
In 2003 there were 20 Chinese schools in the Chicago area. Around 2003 an increase in immigration and non-Chinese American parents sending adopted Chinese children to Chinese schools caused enrollment figures of Chinese schools in the northwestern suburbs of Chicago to increase.

== Religion ==
Compared to Chinese in China, there is a higher proportion of Christians among the Chinese in Chicago. Chinese Christians operate their own missions. The Chinese Christian Union Church, an interdenominational church, has its main facility on Wentworth Avenue in Chicago and satellite facilities in the suburbs and in Bridgeport. Chinese Catholics, many of whom originate from Hong Kong and had converted to Christianity, attend the former St. Maria Incoronata, an Italian Catholic church on Alexander Street. The St. Therese School, founded by the Maryknoll Sisters, was established for the Chinese community.

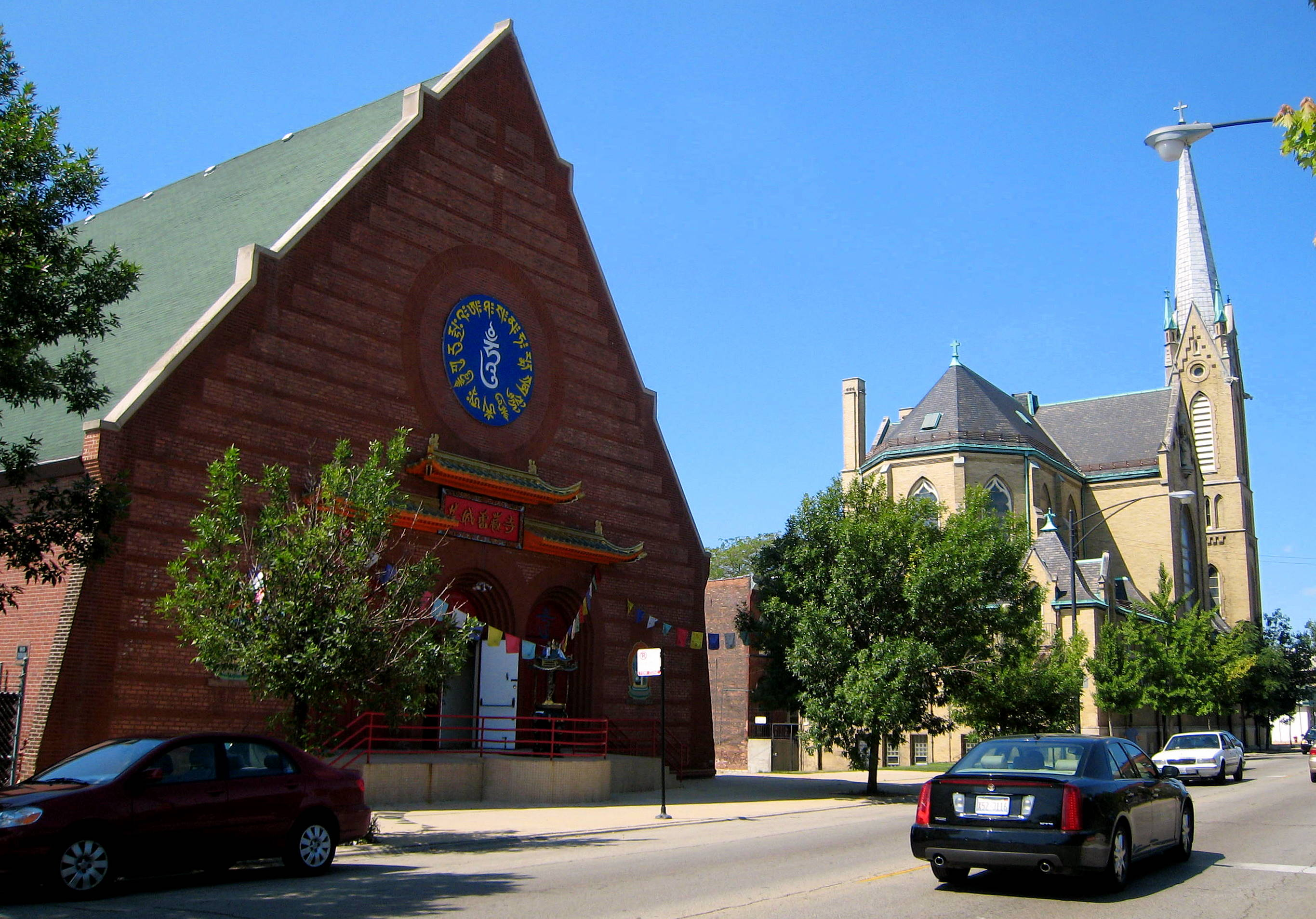
Chinese Buddhist Temple in Bridgeport, Chicago, west of Chinatown.

Christians in the United States attempted to convert Chinese from their native religions after the Chinese began arriving. The earliest recorded Chinese Baptist mission was one that opened on Clark Street, in the Chinese area, in 1878. In the early 20th century, of all cities, Chicago had the largest number of Chinese Sunday schools. In the South Side and West Side of Chicago, these smaller Chinese Sunday schools opened near laundry businesses operated by Chinese. By 1995 these Sunday schools ceased to exist. Franciscan priests and nuns established the first Catholic missions for Chinese people.

Bridgeport, to the west of Chinatown, is home to the Ling Shen Ching Tze Buddhist temple, located in a building which was originally built in 1894 by renowned Chicago architects Burnham and Root. The temple opened in 1992 and serves a growing Chinese Buddhist community on the city's Southwest Side.

== Notable residents ==
- John Chiang, Treasurer of California from 2015-2019
- Ruth Ann Koesun, former ballerina for the American Ballet Theatre
- Chow Leung, Baptist missionary and educator
- Chloe Wang (Chloe Bennet), actress, model, and singer
- Theresa Mah, Illinois State Representative from the 24th House district and the first Asian American elected to the Illinois General Assembly
- Lauren Tom, voice actress

== See also ==
- Chinatown Gate (Chicago)
- Chinese American Veterans Memorial
- Sun Yat-Sen Park (Chicago)

== Bibliography ==
- Ho, Chuimei and Soo Lon Moy (editors) for the Chinatown Museum Foundation. Chinese in Chicago, 1870-1945. Arcadia Publishing, 2005. ISBN 0738534447, 9780738534442.
- Moy, Susan Lee. "The Chinese in Chicago: The First One Hundred Years" (Chapter 13) In: Holli, Melvin G. and Peter d'Alroy Jones (editors). Ethnic Chicago: A Multicultural Portrait. Wm. B. Eerdmans Publishing, 1995. ISBN 0802870538, 9780802870537.
