= Dr. Sun Yat Sen Municipal Park =

Urban park in Macau

Coordinates: 22.216199°N 113.545059°E

- 紀念孫中山市政公園; Parque Municipal Dr. Sun Yat Sen
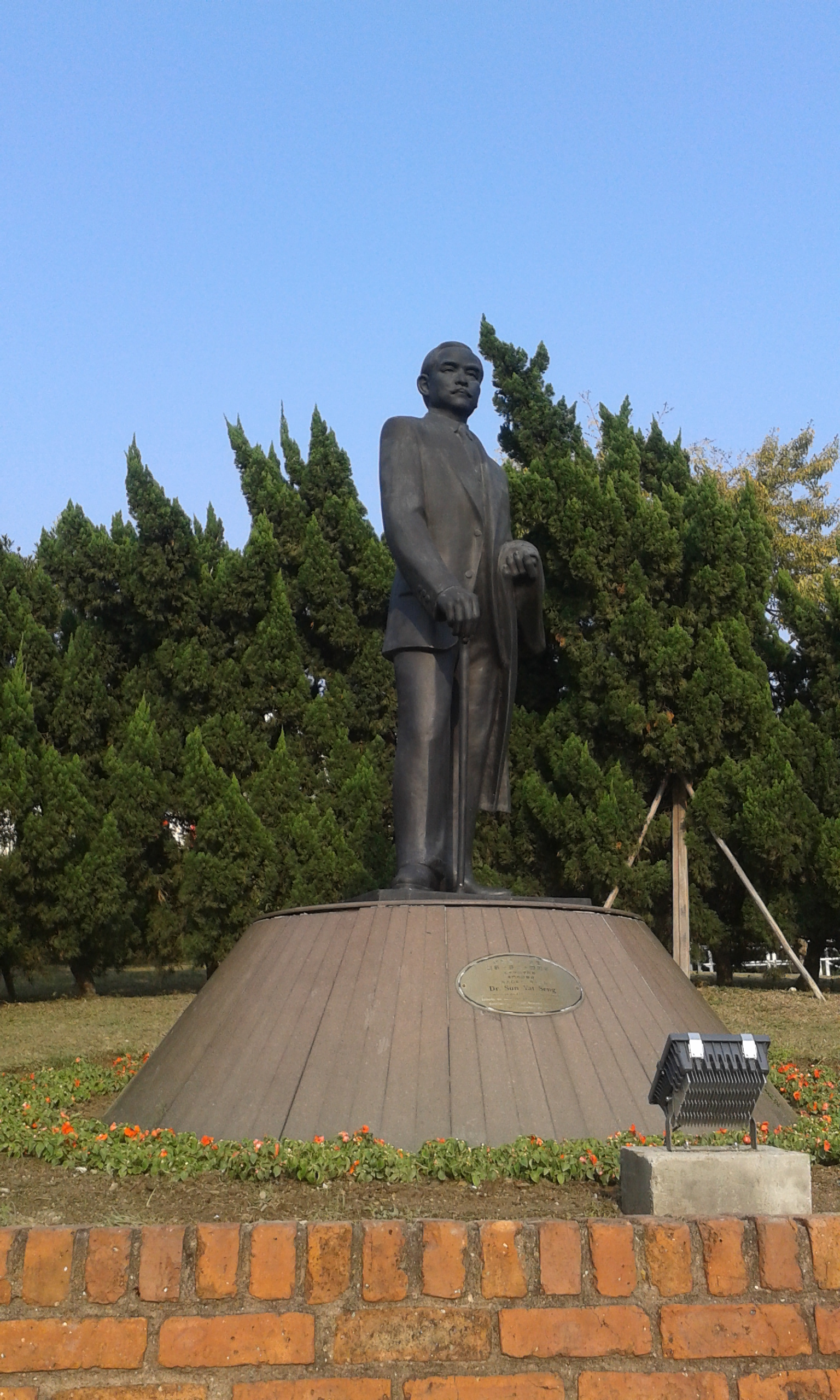
- Interactive map of Dr. Sun Yat Sen Municipal Park
- Location: Nossa Senhora de Fátima, Macau, China
- Opened: 1983
- Operator: IACM

Dr. Sun Yat Sen Municipal Park

Chinese name
- Traditional Chinese: 紀念孫中山市政公園
- Simplified Chinese: 纪念孙中山市政公园
Transcriptions
Standard Mandarin
- Hanyu Pinyin: Jìniàn Sūn Zhōngshān Shìzhèng Gōngyuán
Yue: Cantonese
- Jyutping: gei2 nim6 syun1 zung1 saan1 si5 zing3 gung1 jyun4*2

Portuguese name
- Portuguese: Parque Municipal Dr. Sun Yat Sen

Dr. Sun Yat Sen Municipal Park (Chinese: 紀念孫中山市政公園; Portuguese: Parque Municipal Dr. Sun Yat Sen) is an urban park in Nossa Senhora de Fátima, Macau. The park is named for the founding father of the Republic of China, Dr Sun Yat Sen.

The park is a 70,000-square-meter (17-acre) urban park located in northern Macau along the border with Zhuhai, Mainland China. The park is located next to Canal dos Patos, but access to the former canal is closed off, and Barrier Gate. It was originally called Canal dos Patos Park to commemorate the friendship between China and Portugal in 1987. The park is one of forty-three parks in the world to bear this name.

The park features:

- old gate that marked the entrance to Macau from the mainland
- aviary
- Victorian greenhouse
- flower gardens
- feng shui forest
- swimming pool
- playground
- multi use sports fields
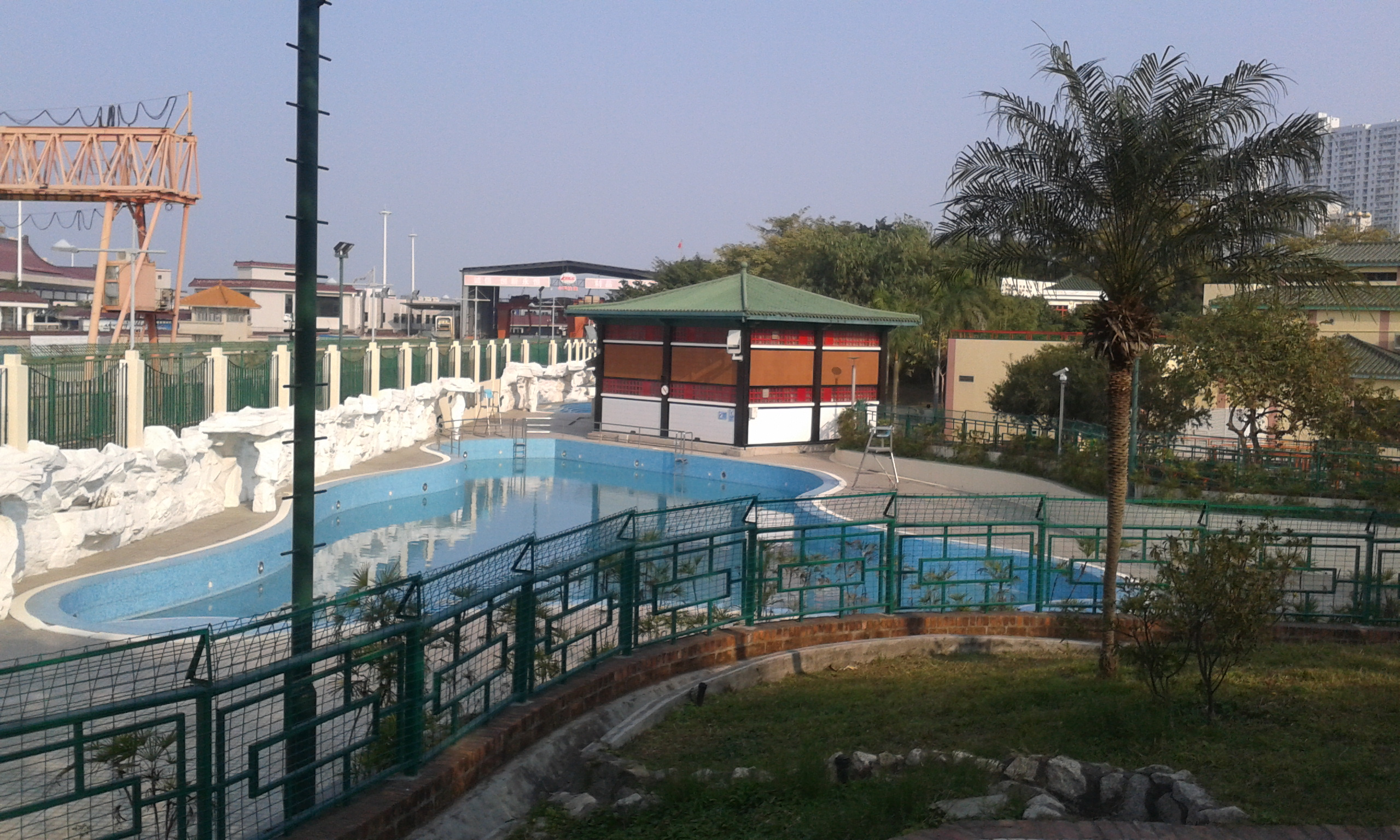
Swimming pool

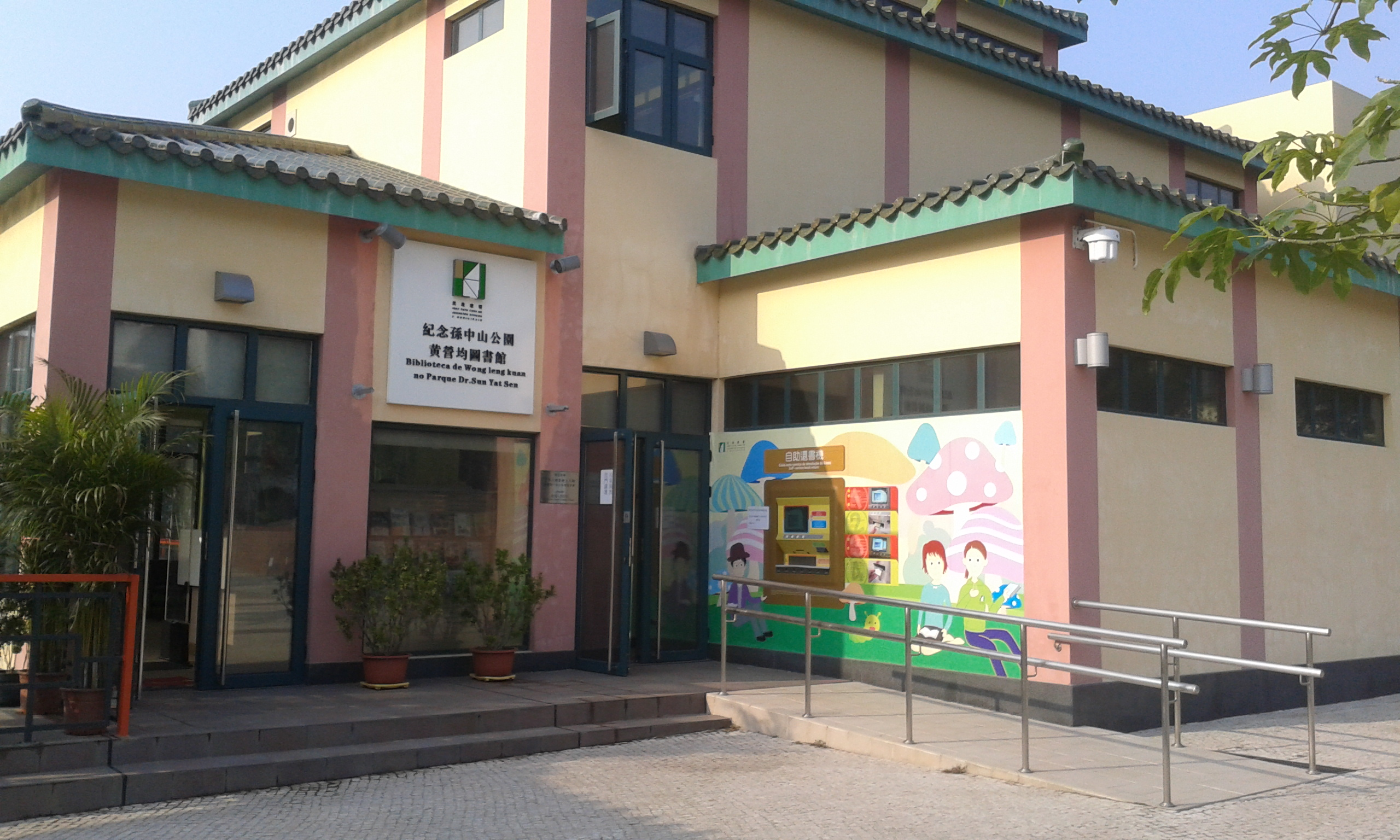
Wong Ieng Kuan Library

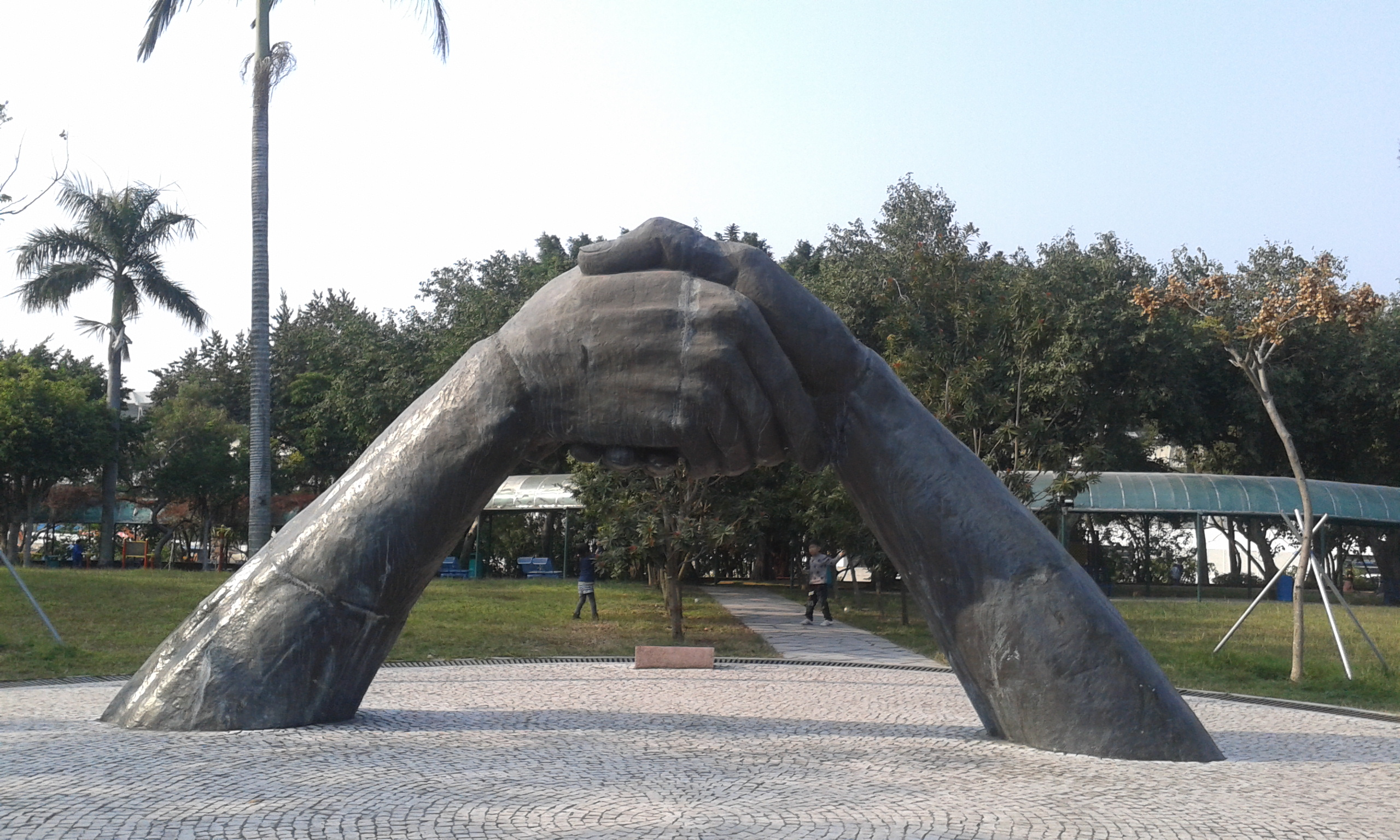
Forever Handshake

== Public library ==
The Macao Public Library Wong Ieng Kuan Library in Dr. Sun Yat-Sen Municipal Park (紀念孫中山公園黃營均圖書館; Biblioteca de Wong Ieng Kuan no Parque Dr. Sun Yat Sen) occupies 459 square metres (4,940 sq ft) of space in a former restaurant in the park. One of several created with funding by Chinese Peruvian Wong Ieng Kuan (黃營均), it opened in a separate building in the park in 1996 and moved to its current building on 24 January 2014.

== See also ==
- Zhongshan Park
