= Zhongshan Park =

Common park name in China

Zhongshan Park (traditional Chinese: 中山公園; simplified Chinese: 中山公园; pinyin: Zhōngshān Gōngyuán; Jyutping: Zung^{1} saan^{1} Gung^{1} jyun^{2}) is a common name for Chinese parks, in honour of Sun Yat-sen, better-known in Chinese as Sun Zhongshan, who is considered by many to be the "Father of modern China". Currently there are more than 40 Zhongshan Parks in China, and some in overseas areas.

== List of Zhongshan Parks ==
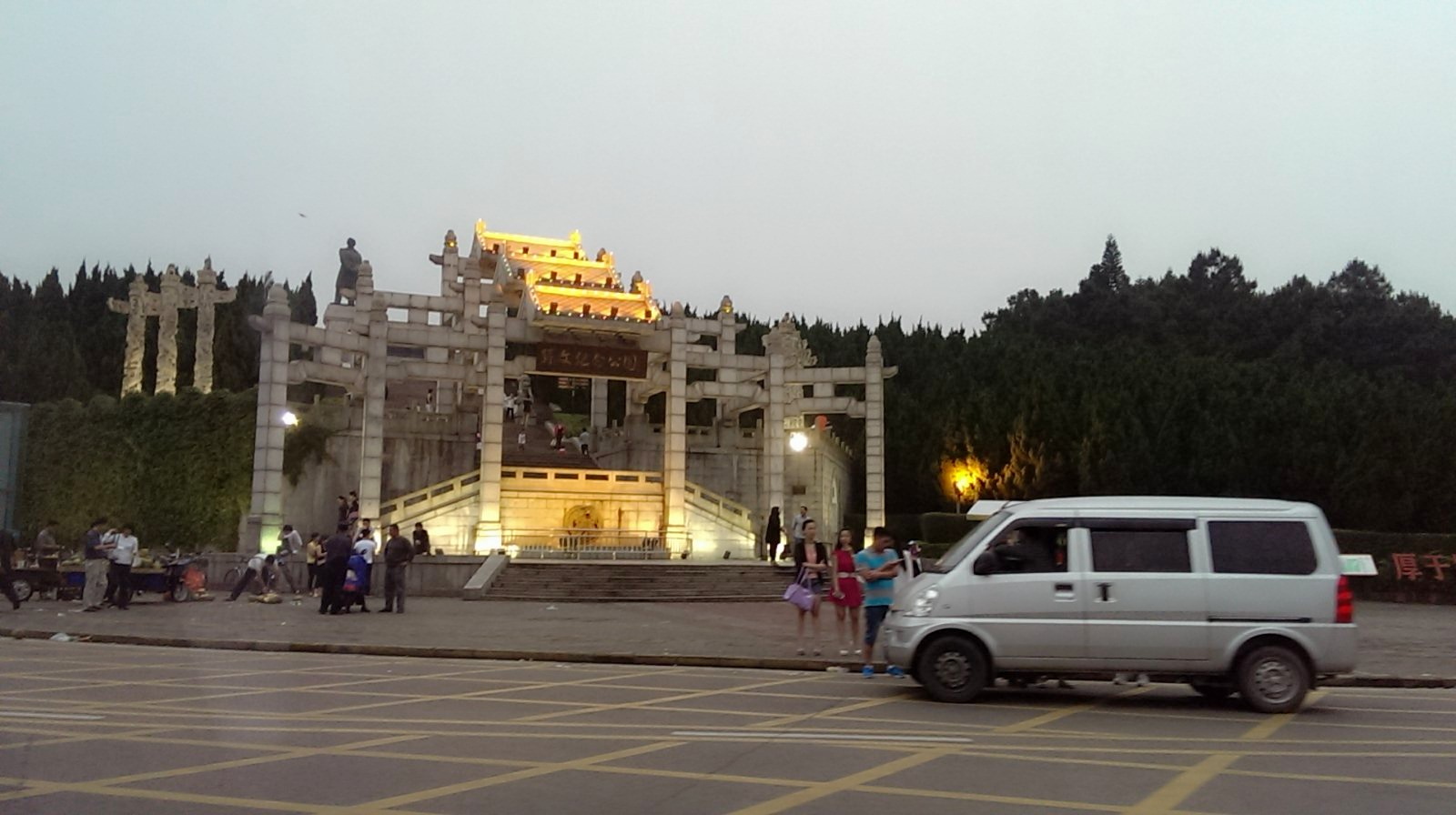
Sun Wen Memorial Park, Zhongshan, Guangdong, PRC

- People's Republic of China
  - Nanjing Zhongshan Park, Nanjing, containing the Sun Yat-sen Mausoleum.
  - Zhongshan Sun Wen Memorial Park, Zhongshan (Sun Yat-sen's birthplace, later renamed after him)
  - Beijing Zhongshan Park, Beijing
  - Shanghai Zhongshan Park, Shanghai
  - Shenyang Zhongshan Park, Shenyang
  - Jinan Zhongshan Park, Jinan
  - Memorial Park of Dr. Sun Yat Sen, Macau
  - Ningbo Zhongshan Park, Ningbo
  - Dalian Zhongshan Park, Dalian
  - Qingdao Zhongshan Park, Qingdao
  - Hangzhou Zhongshan Park, Hangzhou
  - Wuhan Zhongshan Park, Wuhan
  - Xiamen Zhongshan Park, Xiamen
  - Shantou Zhongshan Park, Shantou
  - Shenzhen Zhongshan Park, Shenzhen
  - Foshan Zhongshan Park, Foshan
  - Huizhou Zhongshan Park, Huizhou
  - Wuzhou Zhongshan Park, Wuzhou
  - People's Park (Ürümqi), formerly Zhongshan Park
- Republic of China (Taiwan)
  - Sun Yat-sen Memorial Hall with attached Memorial Park, Taipei
  - Hsinchu Sun Yat-sen Park, Hsinchu
  - Tainan Sun Yat-sen Park, Tainan
  - Taichung Sun Yat-sen Park, Taichung
  - Chiayi Sun Yat-sen Park, Chiayi
  - Yilan Chongshan Park, Yilan
  - Chongshan Memorial Park, Kinmen
  - Luodong Chongshan Park, Luodong, Yilan County
- Hong Kong
  - Sun Yat Sen Memorial Park (formerly Western Park), Sai Ying Pun, Victoria City
  - Hung Lau, Tuen Mun, New Territories
- Canada
  - Parc Sun Yat-sen, Montréal, Québec
  - Dr. Sun Yat-Sen Classical Chinese Garden, Vancouver, British Columbia
- Singapore
  - Zhongshan Park

== See also ==
- Zhongshan Road
