= Sun Yat-Sen Park (Chicago) =

Public park in the U.S. state of Illinois

- The park in 2026
- Interactive map of Sun Yat-Sen Park
- Location: Chicago, Illinois, U.S.
- Coordinates: 41.8481°N 87.6342°W

Sun Yat-Sen Park (also known as Sun Yat-Sen Playlot Park) is a public park in Chicago, Illinois, United States. The park was created in 1977. Named after Sun Yat-sen, the 0.43-acre park has a playground, a covered seating area, and xiangqi (Chinese chess) tables. The playground was renovated in 2015.

The park also has Sun Yat-Sen Memorial by artist Chueh Ming-Teh. The artwork was installed in 1976.

In 2016, Darren Wan of South Side Weekly said Sun Yat-Sen Park was the neighborhood's "best tiny park". Writers for Time Out Chicago included the park in a 2026 list of the "best things to do" in Chinatown.

== See also ==
- History of Chinese Americans in Chicago
- Parks in Chicago
  - List of parks in Chicago
