= Marian M. Hadley =

Librarian

- Hadley in Chicago Tribune, 1959
- Born: 1886; Nashville, Tennessee, US
- Died: 1974 (aged 87–88); Chicago, Illinois, US
- Education: Fisk University
- Occupation: Librarian

Marian M. Hadley was Nashville, Tennessee's first African American librarian, serving as the first librarian of the Nashville Negro Public Library, a branch of the Nashville Public Library for African American patrons. She went on to work at the Chicago Public Library for almost twenty years, building and promoting the library's collection of African American history and culture.

== Early life and education ==
Marian M. Hadley was born in Nashville, Tennessee and was an alumna of Fisk University.

== Work at the Nashville Negro Public Library ==
Andrew Carnegie gave $50,000 to the city of Nashville in 1913 to fund the building of two libraries with the stipulation that funds were to be split equally between a branch for white patrons and another as the first branch in Nashville for African American patrons. At the time, Nashville's library only allowed African Americans to check out books via a bookmobile.

Thirty-five people applied for the librarian and assistant librarian positions; the Carnegie Public Library hired Hadley, a twenty-nine-year-old Nashville resident. After accepting the position in the fall of 1915, Hadley moved temporarily to Louisville, Kentucky to take part in a two-month apprenticeship at the Western Colored Branch of the Louisville Public Library under Thomas Fountain Blue. The all-white library board of trustees required that she pay her own train fare and board to attend the training. The Nashville Negro Public Library was opened on February 10, 1916. Nashville Public Library's head librarian, Margaret Kercheval, also provided guidance in running a library to Hadley and Negro branch assistant librarian Hattie Watkins.

In her role as librarian, Hadley became "a driving force in the Nashville African American community." She was highly respected, with a library administrator writing "her work was of the highest order, and in all respects she manifested commendable zeal and interest in whatever she undertook." Hadley served as librarian of the branch for three years before resigning in 1919. After resigning from the library, she became the first executive secretary of the Young Women's Christian Association chapter in Nashville in 1919, helping to establish a local YWCA for African Americans, the Blue Triangle chapter. She returned to the library in the spring of 1921, this time at a salary of $70 per month instead of her previous $60 per month; she worked another two years as the librarian of the Negro Public Library before resigning again.

== Work at the Chicago Public Library ==
In the 1920s, Hadley moved to Chicago to work for the Chicago Public Library. She was one of a talented group of black women professionals brought to the library by Vivian G. Harsh (CPL's first African American librarian), including Charlemae Hill Rollins and Doris E. Saunders. Hadley worked with Harsh to build the library's Special Negro Collection and promote its use through programming; frequent visitors to that collection included Richard Wright and Langston Hughes. She exchanged a number of letters with W. E. B. Du Bois, who was also a visitor to the collection.

Beginning with her time at Fisk University, Hadley had a strong interest in African American history and culture and collected over 1,000 images of African American people and topics. By the 1950s her slide collection was one of the largest in the country on the subject, and she gave talks featuring these images at clubs and churches throughout Chicago.

She worked at the Chicago Public Library for almost twenty years, retiring in 1959.

After her retirement, Hadley was a founding member of Chicago's Ebony Museum of Negro History and Art, which would later become the DuSable Museum of African American History. Hadley died around 1974.
