= Frederic H. Hammurabi Robb =

Activist, lawyer, and editor (1900-1978)

- Other name: Fidepe H. Hammurabi
- Education: Howard University; Northwestern University

Frederic H. Hammurabi Robb (1900–1978) was an African American lawyer, author, publisher, and curator.

== Early life ==
Frederic Robb was born in 1900 to Martha and Robert Robb in Hartford, Connecticut. Frederic, who sometimes went by "Fritz" as a youth, had a sister named Beatrice (Canady) and a brother named George.

After graduating from high school in 1920, he continued his undergraduate education at Howard University. He completed his studies to become a lawyer at Northwestern University in 1927. but is not known to have practiced law extensively.

== Career ==
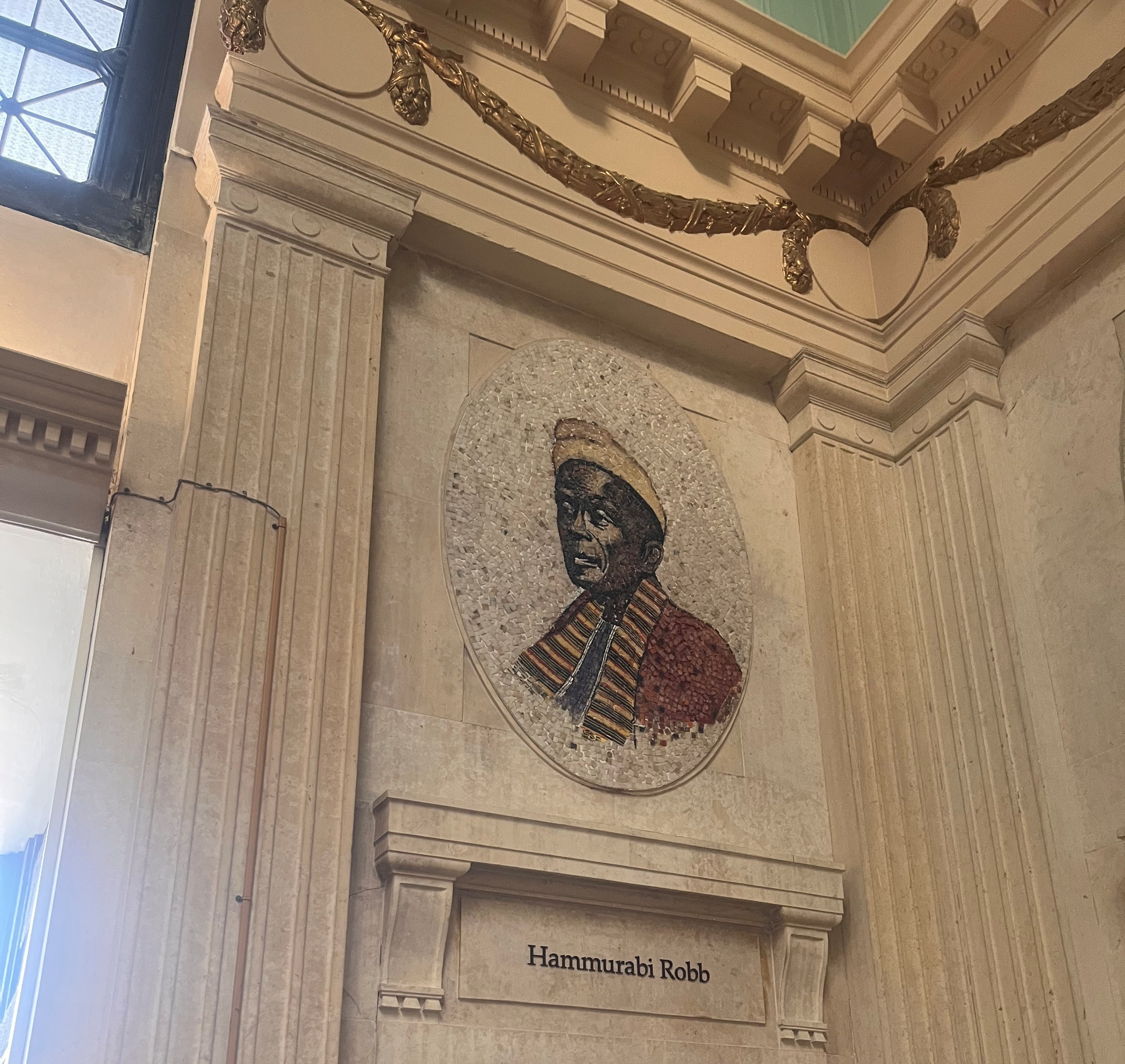
Mosaic of Robb in the foyer of the DuSable Museum

Robb was an "indefatigable author, publisher, and curator" who edited the Intercollegian Wonder Books. The Wonder Books were written by "members of the Washington Intercollegiate Club, an organization for Black students and graduates" that began at the Wabash Avenue YMCA in 1909. Robb was the "editor-in-chief and guiding spirit of the books" and served as the president of the club from 1926 to 1927.

He compiled the book The Chicago Round-up, 1779-1951: A Vest Pocket Encyclopedia (1951). (The University of Chicago Special Collections holds an autographed copy of this book.) Robb also wrote a history column for the Chicago Defender newspaper in the 1940s.

Robb was a pan-Africanist who traveled to Africa frequently and attended FESTAC 77. He was an early advocate for the celebration of Black History Month, and was in contact with notable Black thinkers and activists of his time. He founded the House of Knowledge (also known as the World Wide Friends of Africa), housed in the Griffiths-Burroughs House in Chicago's Bronzeville neighborhood, which would become the first home of the DuSable Museum of African American History, of which he is considered a co-founder.

In September 1942, Robb was one of eighty-five African Americans arrested in a federal raid in Chicago by the FBI. He, along three women and eight other men including Elijah Muhammad were charged with sedition. Later, he was venerated as an "elder" of the Chicago scene of the Black Arts Movement. Haki Madhabuti describes Robb as one of the elders who held "court around history and culture," in public sites like Washington Park in Chicago.

== Death ==
Robb died in Chicago on March 29, 1978.
