= Illinois Heartland Library System =

American regional library system

- Predecessor: Lewis & Clark Library System; Lincoln Trail Libraries System; Rolling Prairie Library System; Shawnee Library System
- Formation: 2011; 15 years ago
- Type: Governmental
- Headquarters: 6725 Goshen Road
- Location: Evansville, Illinois, United States
- Executive Director: Leslie Bednar
- Staff: 100 (2025)
- Website: www.illinoisheartland.org

Illinois Heartland Library System (IHLS) is a regional library system that serves libraries in southern and east-central Illinois, including public, school, academic, and special libraries. Established in 2011, IHLS is funded by an annual area and per-capita grant awarded by the Illinois State Library according to the Illinois Library System Act, and a portion of IHLS funding is received from federal grants distributed by the Institute of Museum and Library Services. IHLS is one of three library systems in Illinois, along with Reaching Across Illinois Library System (RAILS) and the Chicago Public Library.

== History ==
In 2011, four southern and east-central Illinois library systems consolidated into Illinois Heartland Library System. The merger combined the Lewis & Clark Library System, the Lincoln Trail Libraries System, the Rolling Prairie Library System, and the Shawnee Library System. The system consisted of 584 member libraries in 2012, including 41 academic libraries, 299 public libraries, 259 school libraries, and 56 special libraries. Its first and current chief executive was Leslie Bednar, who previously headed the Lewis & Clark Library System.

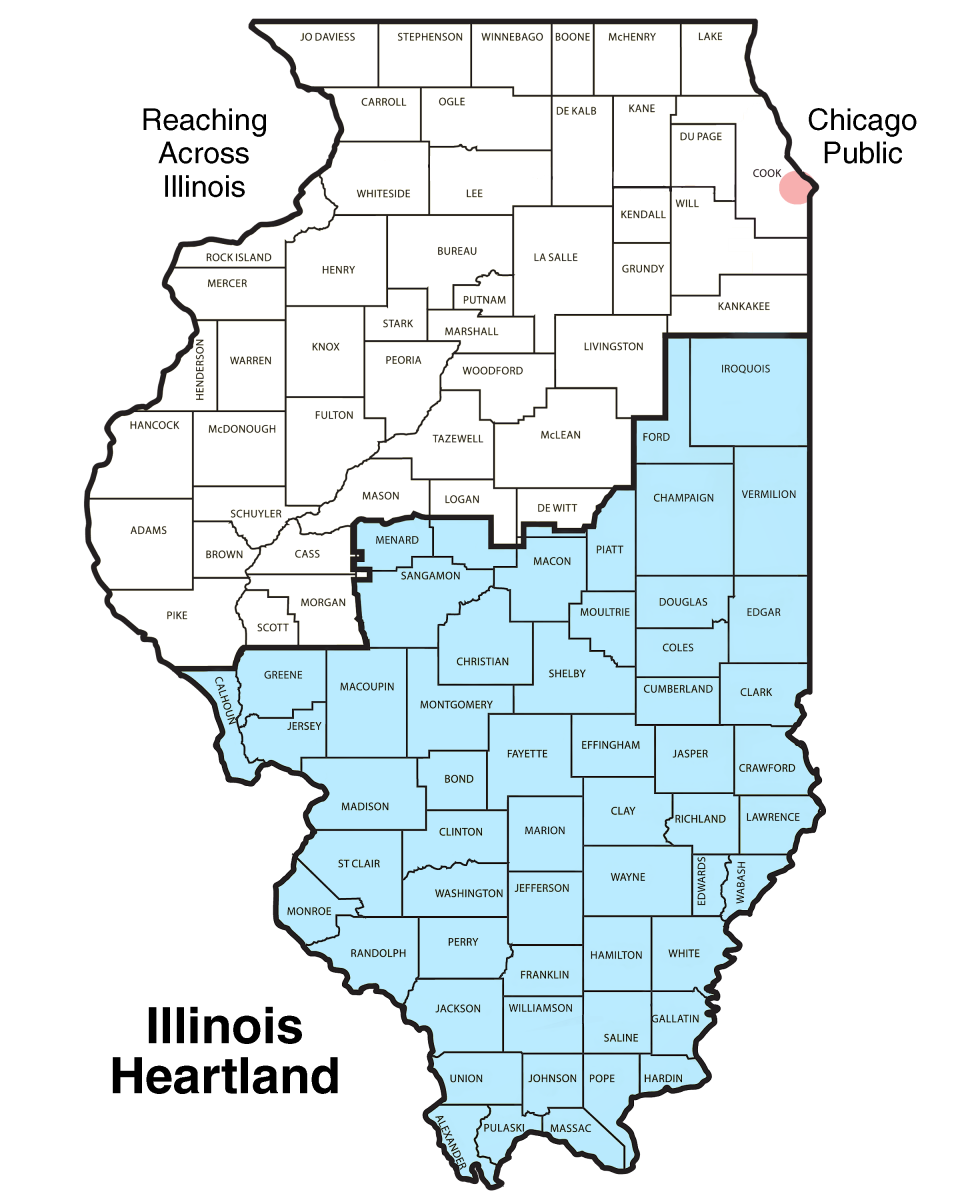
Service area of the Illinois Heartland Library System in blue

IHLS is one of three library systems in Illinois, along with Reaching Across Illinois Library System (RAILS) and the Chicago Public Library. IHLS is funded by an annual area and per-capita grant awarded by the Illinois State Library according to the Illinois Library System Act and a portion of IHLS funding is received from federal grants distributed by the Institute of Museum and Library Services. Libraries in Illinois must maintain membership with a library system to be eligible for grants awarded by the Illinois State Library.

In 2025, IHLS includes 524 member libraries and 100 staff members. Its headquarters are located in Edwardsville, Illinois. It is a member of the International Coalition of Library Consortia.

== Services and activities ==
IHLS provides financial and in-kind support to the Local Library System Automation Program (LLSAP) SHARE, a shared library catalog. The combined collections of IHLS institutions include nearly ten million items. The system covers 28,141 square miles, with hubs in Carbondale, Champaign, and Edwardsville. In fiscal year 2022, IHLS delivered 2,550,187 items between locations. Delivery vans are sold or donated to libraries through a grant after they are replaced.

In 2022, IHLS launched the ILEAD Trustee Learning Portal, a free resource for public library board members to access training on finance, library law, and other essential information.
