= Doris E. Saunders =

American businesswoman, librarian, and journalist

- Born: Doris Elaine Evans; August 8, 1921; Chicago, Illinois, USA
- Died: March 24, 2014 (aged 92); Jackson, Mississippi
- Education: Northwestern University; Central YMCA College; Roosevelt University; Boston University; Vanderbilt University
- Notable credit(s): Black Society; The Day They Marched; The Kennedy Years and the Negro; Negro Handbook; Kith and Kin: Focus on Families; Special Moments in African-American History, 1955-1996: The Photographs of Moneta Sleet, Jr.

Doris E. Saunders (August 8, 1921 – March 24, 2014) was an American librarian, author, editor, businesswoman, and professor of Journalism. She started her career in 1942 as a Junior Library Assistant with the Chicago Public Library (CPL) system. She quickly rose through the ranks and in 1948 she became the highest-ranking African-American Librarian at the CPL. In 1949, she went to work for Johnson Publishing Company establishing the first corporate research library by and about African Americans. Later she became head of the Johnson Publishing Company Books Division. Later in life, Saunders founded Ancestor Hunting, a genealogy research company, and wrote its publication, "Kith and Kin: Focus on Families." She was also Professor of Journalism and Chairwoman of the Department of Mass Communication at Jackson State University. After her retirement from Jackson State, Saunders continued to work with the Books Division at Johnson Publishing and Ancestor Hunting.

== Early years, education, family, and career path ==
Doris Evans was born on August 8, 1921, in Chicago, Illinois, to Thelma Rice and John Alvesta Stewart Evans. She attended Englewood High School in Chicago from 1934 to 1938. Her father died in 1935. After his death, Doris and her family moved in with her maternal grandmother and step-grandfather on South Lafayette Avenue in Chicago's Bronzeville neighborhood.

Doris entered Northwestern University in 1938 and remained until 1939. She then briefly pursued studies at Central YMCA College in Chicago (now Roosevelt University) from 1939 to 1941. Inspired by long-time friend and mentor Charlemae Hill Rollins, in 1941, Doris entered the Chicago Public Library Training Class and completed the course of study and practice in 1942. In May 1942, she became a Junior Library Assistant and shortly thereafter she passed the Civil Service examination for Senior Library Assistant. She was first assigned to the Book Selection Department, and later transferred to the Hall Branch Library under the leadership of Vivian Harsh, and then to the George M. Pullman Branch Library. During this time Doris established and co-owned the Studio Bookshop on Michigan Ave. across the street from the Rosenwald Court Apartments. While at Pullman in 1948, Saunders was promoted and became the first African-American reference librarian to work in the Social Science and Business Division of the Main Library. Between 1947 and 1951, she attended Roosevelt University completing a Bachelor of Arts degree in Philosophy. Doris married Sidney Smith in 1942 and was divorced in 1947. She married Vincent E. Saunder Jr. in 1950, separated in 1959, and later divorced in 1964. She had two children with Vincent E. Saunders Jr..

In 1976, after Saunders' children had completed college, she went to Boston University. She completed a Master of Science in Journalism from the School of Public Communication and a Master of Arts in Afro-American Studies from the graduate school in one year. These degrees were awarded in 1977. From 1983 to 1984, she studied toward a Ph.D. in history at Vanderbilt University in Nashville, Tennessee.

Saunders was involved in many organizations. She served as a board member of the Black Academy of Arts and Letters, board member of the American Civil Liberties Union Illinois Chapter, member of the Chicago Leadership Resource Program, National Association of Media Women, Chicago Publicity Club, Alpha Gamma Pi Sorority, and Black Advisory Commission for the 1980 census in Washington, D.C.

The Doris E. Saunders Papers are located at the Vivian G. Harsh Research Collection of Afro-American History and Literature in Chicago, Illinois.

== Johnson Publishing Company ==
In January 1949, Saunders wrote a letter to John H. Johnson, who had just purchased a building that he was renovating for Ebony magazine offices. She suggested that he establish a special research library for his editorial and advertising staff and clients. Saunders envisioned the library would document and archive the African American and diasporic experience in the United States and beyond. She also sought to provide demographic data (Saunders' specialty as a librarian), that would facilitate the efforts of the advertising department as they sought to build advertising and advertising revenue. Saunders was quickly called in for an interview and on February 1, 1949, she became responsible for establishing the library at Johnson Publishing Company. She was promoted to establish and direct the company's new Book Publishing Division between 1960 and 1961. The first books published were Burn Killer Burn (1962) and Before The Mayflower (1962).

During her time at Johnson Publishing, Saunders co-authored Black Society with Geri Major 1976 and edited over 20 books, including: The Day They Marched (1963) and The Kennedy Years and the Negro (1964) What Manner of Man a Biography of Martin Luther King Jr.(1964). She compiled Negro Handbook (1966) Ebony HandBook (1974) Du Bois: A Pictorial Biography (1978) and Special Moments in African-American History, 1955-1996: The Photographs of Moneta Sleet, Jr. (1998).

== Women's Institute for Freedom of the Press ==
In 1977, Saunders became an associate of the Women's Institute for Freedom of the Press (WIFP). WIFP is an American nonprofit publishing organization. The organization works to increase communication between women and connect the public with forms of women-based media.

== Ancestor Hunting ==
Saunders founded Ancestor Hunting with her children and grandchildren in 1982. The company focused on genealogical research and published the newsletter Kith and Kin: Focus on Families. Throughout the 1980s, Saunders traveled speaking regularly to genealogy conventions and groups to promote her business, and the newsletter and to encourage documenting one's family history. Her goal was to make genealogy accessible to all people, especially African-Americans.

== Jackson State University ==
Saunders began working at Jackson State University, (JSU) in Jackson, Mississippi in January 1978 through a one-semester writer-in-residence position. Later that same year, she left Johnson Publishing Company and accepted the position of Professor and Coordinator of Print Journalism at Jackson State University. While at Jackson State University Saunders led the successful accreditation effort for The Journalism Department. JSU thus became the first journalism program in the State of Mississippi to be accredited. Saunders established an annual communication conference on the JSU campus beginning in 1978 to ensure student exposure to professionals across the media industry and from around the nation. In the early 1990s, Saunders' leadership led to the successful acquisition of a $500,000.00 grant from the Mississippi state legislature which provided the seed money for the establishment of Channel 23 TV, now JSU-TV. She remained Professor and Chair of the Department of Mass Communications at Jackson State University until retiring in 1996.
