= Josephine Mason Milligan =

American botanist, social activist and author

- Born: February 27, 1835; Philadelphia, Pennsylvania
- Died: 1911 (aged 75–76)
- Scientific career
- Fields: Botany

Josephine Mason Wade Milligan (February 27, 1835 – July 5, 1911) was a botanist, wildflower collector, and writer who donated her herbarium to the Smithsonian Institution. She collected plants in various states around the world, those including Massachusetts, Michigan, Illinois, Tennessee, Virginia, Florida, Alabama, Louisiana, Missouri, Nebraska, Kansas, Colorado, Texas, and Montana between 1863 and 1893.

== Biography ==
Milligan was born in Philadelphia, Pennsylvania to Nelson and Royina Mason Wade. She married Harvey William Milligan in Brownsport Furnace, Tennessee on March 16, 1856. They later moved to Milligan lived in Jacksonville, Illinois and had five children, three of whom survived into adulthood: George, Josephine and Laurance.

Milligan founded the Jacksonville Sorosis in 1868, the oldest surviving women's literary society in the United States, and the Jacksonville Household Science Club in 1885. She was one of the earliest members of the Jacksonville Natural History Society, a member of the Microscopical Society, and a contributing writer to the New York Tribune. She was honored by the Illinois State Historical Society which created a miniature figurine of her which was displayed in the State Library.
