= Chicago Lawn Branch =

Public library in Chicago, Illinois, U.S.

Coordinates: 41.7819°N 87.7035°W

Chicago Lawn Branch is a Chicago Public Library located in the Chicago Lawn neighborhood of Chicago, in the U.S. state of Illinois. It was built in 1960 in what is now 61st Place and Kedzie Avenue. This library is also where the historical Chicago Lawn information is housed by the Chicago Lawn Historical Society. The library displays the Chicago Lawn historical collections.
