= Carter G. Woodson Regional Library =

Library in Chicago, Illinois, US

Coordinates: 41.7211°N 87.6427°W

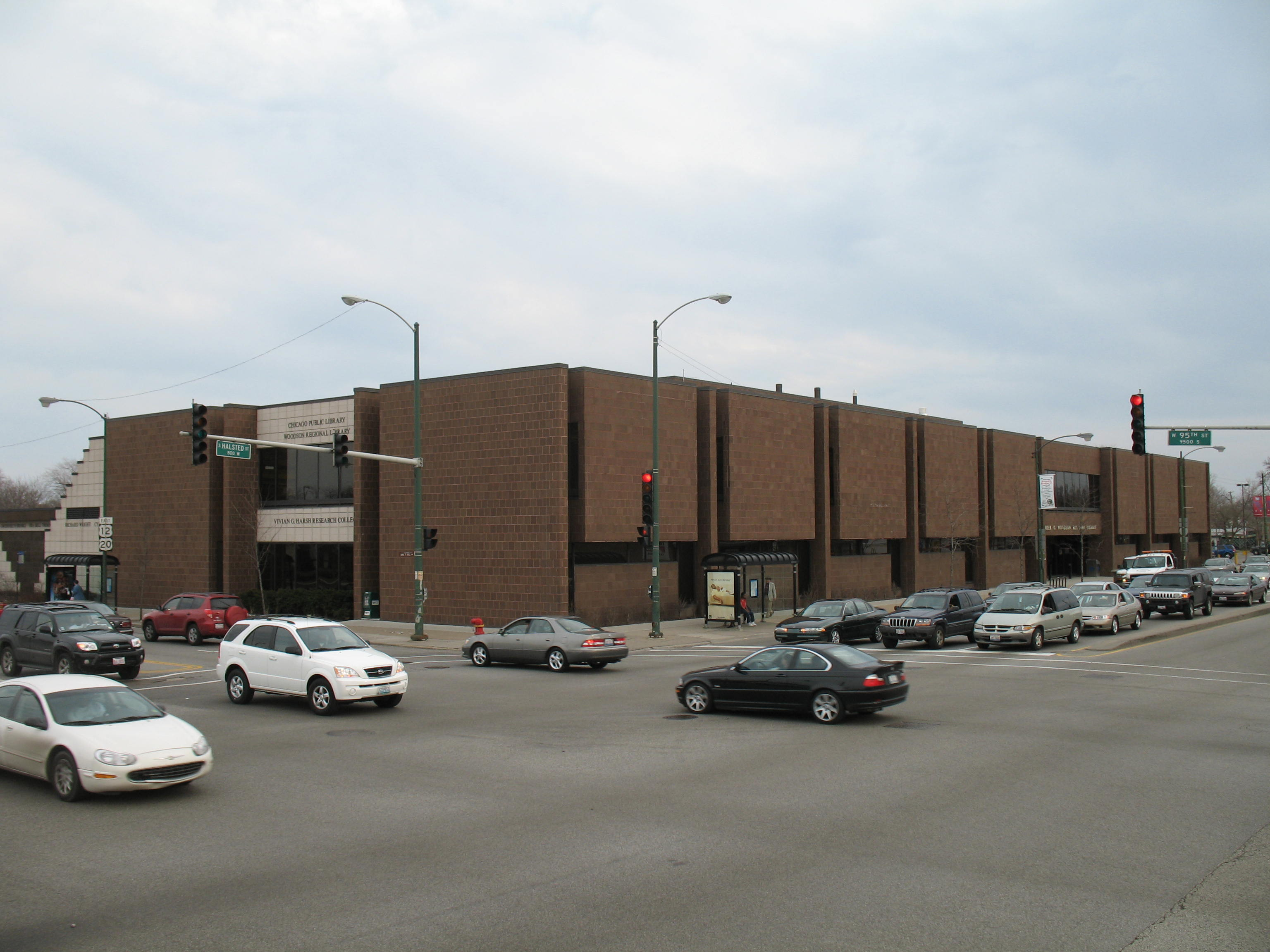
Woodson Regional Library, viewed from the opposite corner of the 95th/Halsted Street intersection

Carter G. Woodson Regional Library is one of three regional libraries in the Chicago Public Library system in Chicago, in the U.S. state of Illinois, serving as the hub for the approximately 24 branch libraries of the South District. It is named for Carter Woodson, founder of the Association for the Study of African American Life and History. The library is in Chicago's Washington Heights neighborhood at 9525 S. Halsted Street.

== Overview ==
The building opened on December 19, 1975. It is a full-service library and is ADA compliant. As with all libraries in the Chicago Public Library system, it has free Wi-Fi internet service.

In addition to providing everyday library services, the Woodson Regional library is home to the Vivian G. Harsh Research Collection of Afro-American History & Literature, which was started by Ms. Harsh when she was director of the George Cleveland Hall branch of Chicago Public Library. The Vivian G. Harsh Research Collection contains photographs, manuscripts, and rare books related to African American history with an emphasis on the Midwest and Chicago. The building was expanded in 1998 to provide updated facilities for the Harsh Collection.
