= Amanda Rudd =

Amanda Rudd

Amanda Sullivan Randle Rudd (April 9, 1923 – February 11, 2017) was an American librarian and the first African American and the first woman to serve as Commissioner of the Chicago Public Library.

== Life ==
Born in Greenville, South Carolina, Rudd attended Florida A & M University and Case Western Reserve University in Cleveland, the latter from which she earned her master's degree in library science. During her time in Cleveland, she worked in the public school system teaching second grade, and later became Assistant Director of School Libraries for Cleveland's public schools. In 1970, she moved to Chicago, where she worked for Field Enterprises as an education consultant to school systems, helping them adopt the company's publication, World Book Encyclopedia, into their curriculum. In 1975, she was hired on at the Chicago Public Library as assistant chief librarian, focusing on community outreach, before taking on a deputy commissioner position and later an acting commissioner position. In 1982, she was promoted to the role of library commissioner, making her the first woman and the first African-American Commissioner of the Chicago Public Library. She resigned as commissioner in February 1985, but continued to work for the library for the following two years as a consultant. Following the expiration of her consultant contract with the library, Rudd began work for the book distributor Baker & Taylor before retiring and moving to Cleveland and Washington, D.C., and later settling in Atlanta, Georgia.

Rudd died in Atlanta on February 11, 2017.

== Impact ==
A great deal of Rudd's librarianship centered on advocating for and creating an atmosphere of equality and diversity. As commissioner, she worked with communities, especially Black and Hispanic communities, in Chicago to determine their needs and provide them with the opportunity to learn about all of the CPL's services. In her work with Baker & Taylor, she spent much of her time with the company working on an African-American-centric annotated bibliography for children's literature. She also served as a mentor to many figures in the library science field, including Mary Ghikas, senior associate executive director of the ALA, and Carla Hayden, former ALA president and the Librarian of Congress since 2016.
