= Reaching Across Illinois Library System =

Regional library system in Northern, West-central Illinois

Coordinates: 41°40′N 88°30′W

- Location: Burr Ridge, Illinois
- Established: 2011

Access and use
- Population served: Northern, West-central Illinois

Other information
- Director: Monica Harris
- Website: https://railslibraries.org/

The Reaching Across Illinois Library System is a regional library system consisting of approximately 1,250 public, academic, special, and school library members, representing more than 4,000 library facilities in Northern, West-central Illinois. The regional library system was created in 2011 when the Alliance Library System, DuPage Library System, Metropolitan Library System, North Suburban Library System, and Prairie Area Library System merged.

In Illinois, regional library systems were established by state law. Member libraries must certify that they meet membership requirements annually. The systems are funded by annual system area and per capita grants from the Illinois State Library.

== Activities ==
The library system through the eRead Illinois program has been actively working with Baker & Taylor to make e-books accessible to its members.

The library system has worked with the Illinois Library Association and received support from the American Library Association Digital Content Working Group, the Public Library Association (PLA), and the Illinois Heartland Library System on the annual Soon to be Famous Illinois Author project, which recognizes a self-published author of adult fiction. This initiative received the John Cotton Dana Public Relations Award from the American Library Association in 2015.

Other services the library system provides include support for shared catalogs, continuing education opportunities, consulting, group purchases, and delivery of interlibrary loan materials.

The library system maintains a YouTube channel.
