= John W. Griffiths Mansion =

Historic house in Illinois, United States

- Griffiths, John W., Mansion
- U.S. National Register of Historic Places
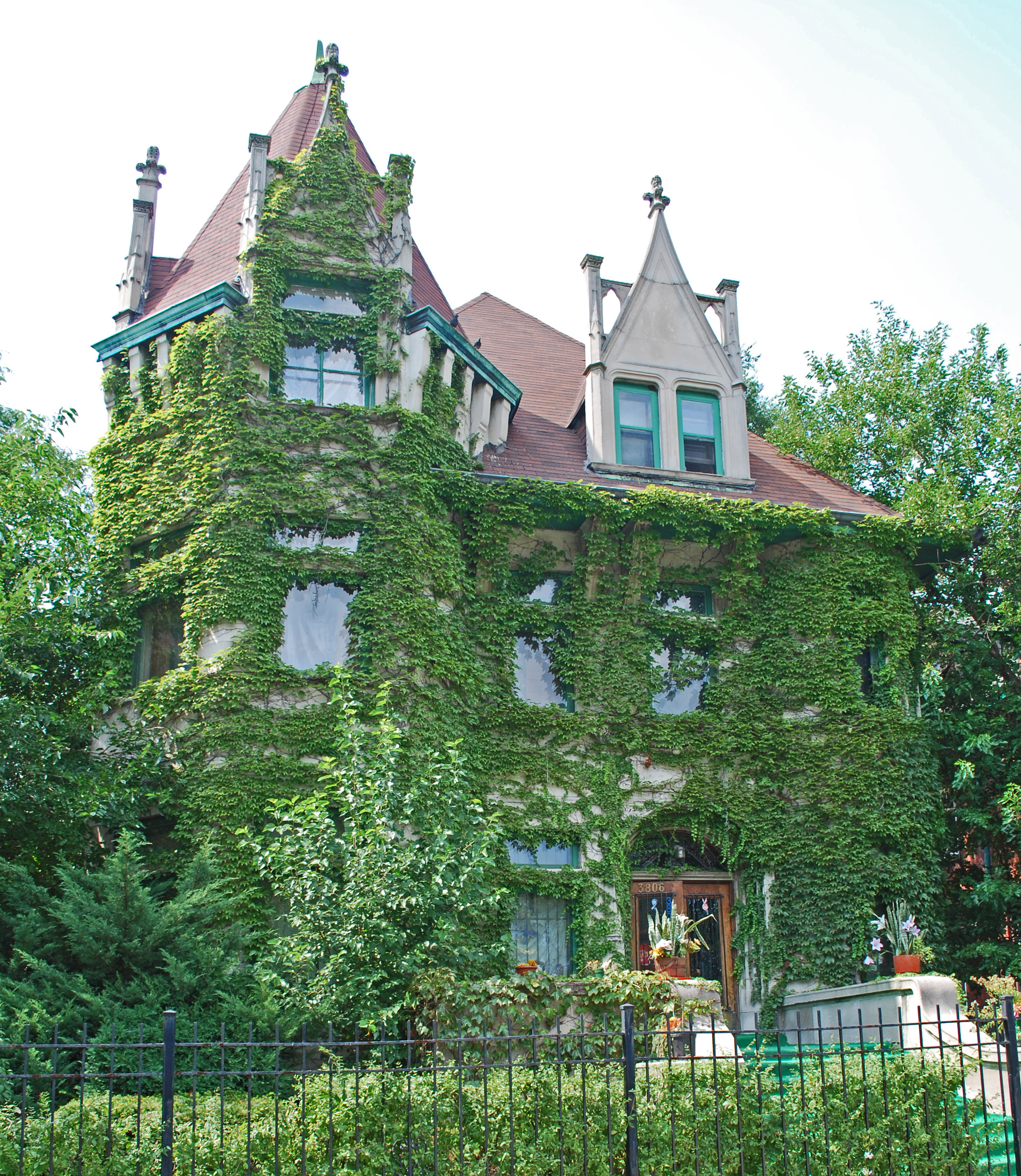

- Location within Chicago metropolitan area Location within Illinois Location within the United States
- Location: 3806 S. Michigan Ave., Chicago, Illinois
- Coordinates: 41°49′32″N 87°37′26″W
- Area: less than one acre
- Built: 1893-94
- Architect: Solon Beman
- Architectural style: Chateauesque
- NRHP reference No.: 82002528
- Added to NRHP: March 5, 1982

The John W. Griffiths Mansion is a historic house at 3806 S. Michigan Avenue in the Douglas community area of Chicago, Illinois.

== History ==
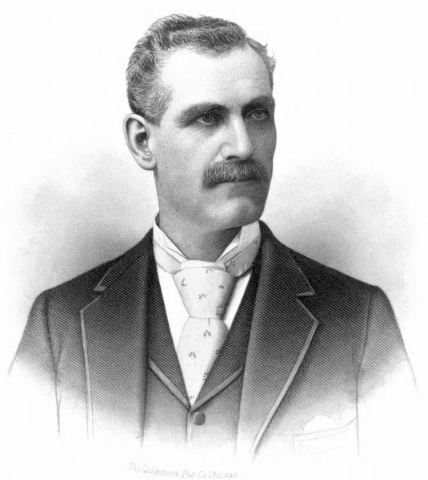
John Griffiths

The house was built in 1893–1894 for John W. Griffiths, a prominent building contractor who worked in Chicago during its reconstruction after the Great Chicago Fire. Architect Solon Beman designed the Chateauesque house, which features a limestone-clad exterior, an octagon-shaped tower on its northeast corner, corbels along the roof line, and dormers topped with finials. The house was typical of those on Michigan Avenue at the time, as many affluent Chicagoans built their homes there; it was also one of the last such homes, as the Panic of 1893 and industrial development led the area to lose its popularity with the wealthy.

After Griffiths died in 1937, the home became the meeting place of the Quincy Club, a social club for black railroad workers. It later became the first home of the DuSable Museum of African American History.

The house was added to the National Register of Historic Places on March 5, 1982.

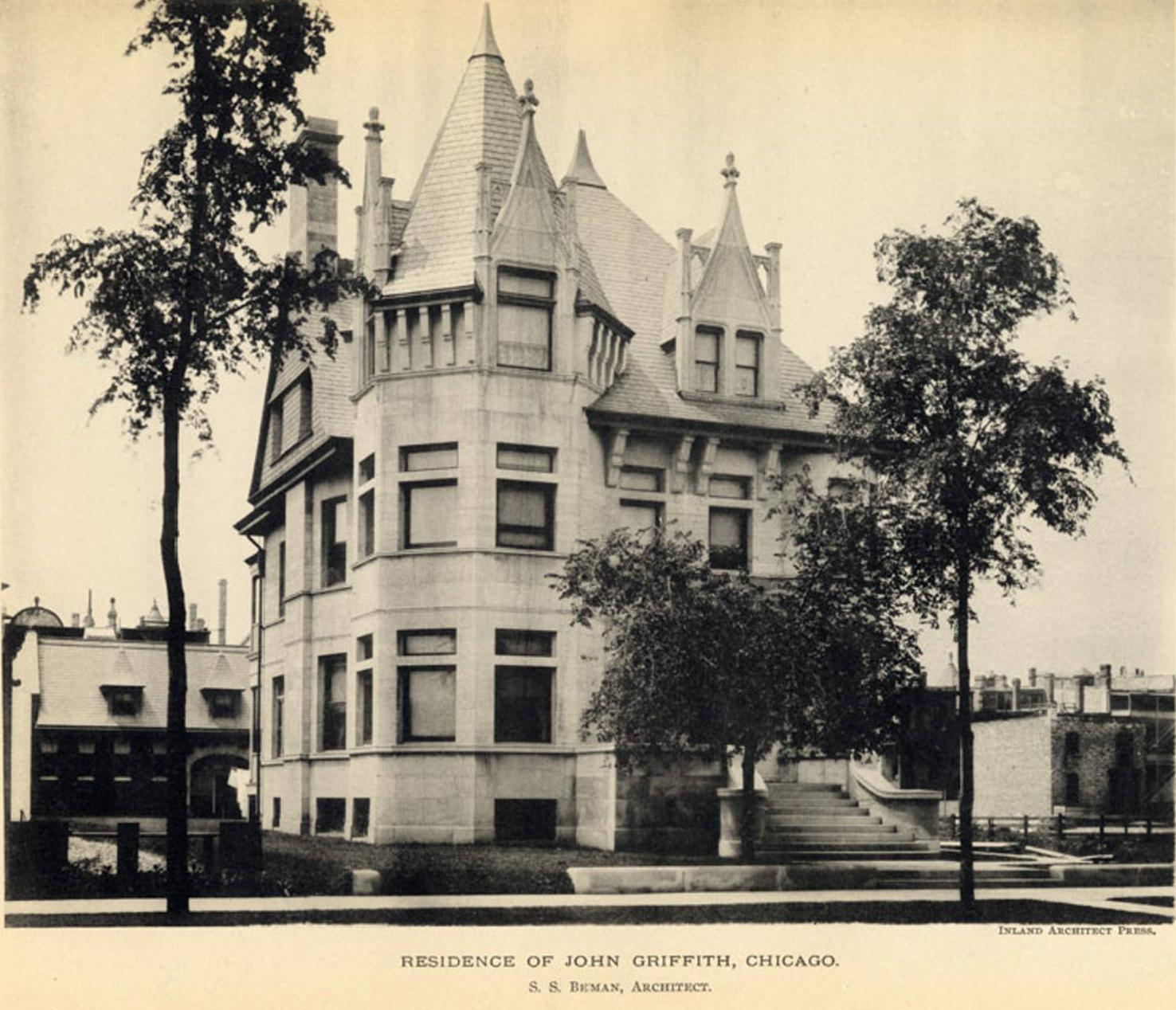
John W. Griffiths house, c. 1893
