= DuSable Black History Museum =

African-American museum in Chicago, Illinois, U.S.

The DuSable
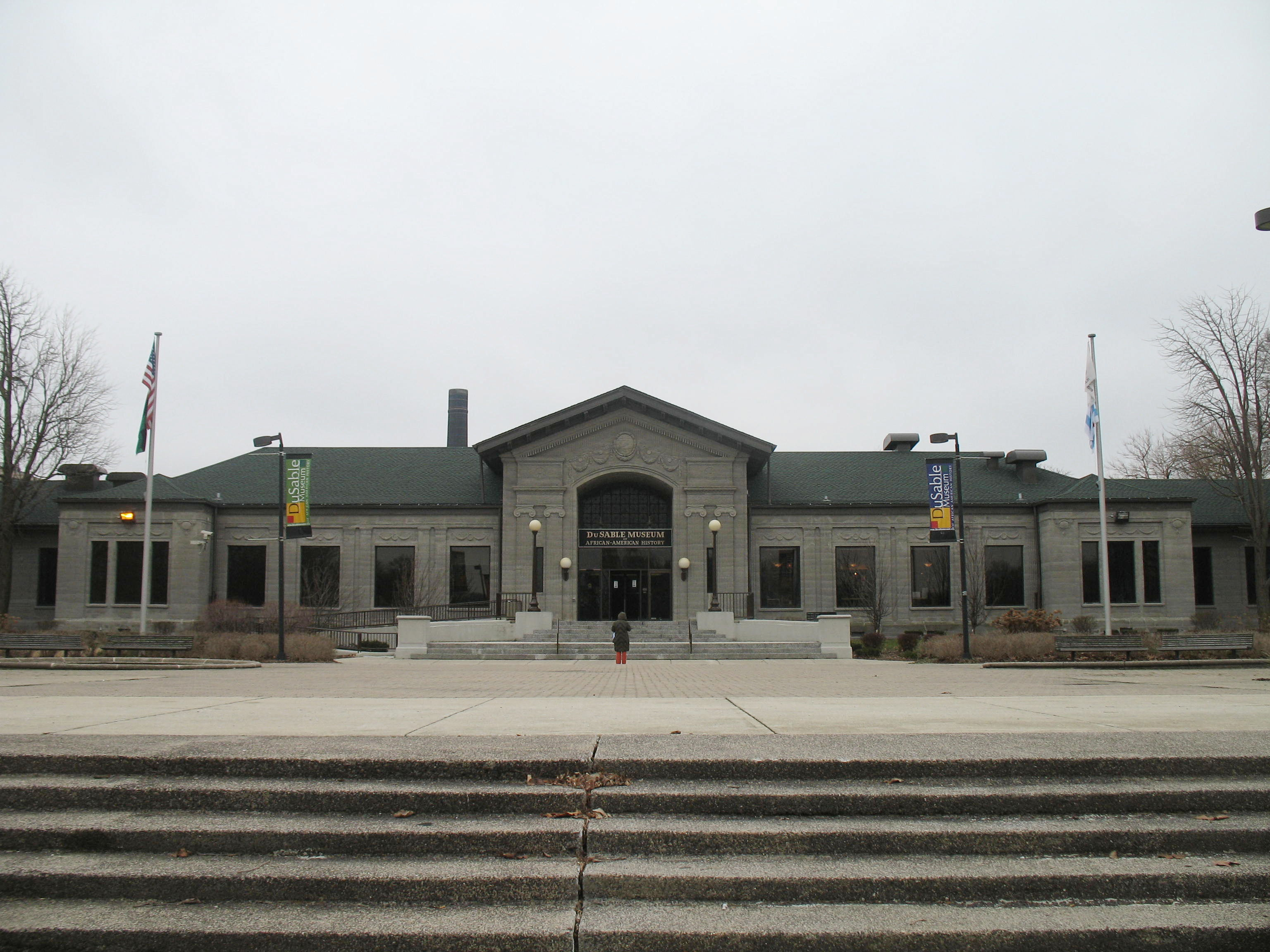

- Location within the Chicago metropolitan area
- Former name: Ebony Museum of Negro History and Art
- Established: February 16, 1961 (current location since 1973)
- Location: 740 East 56th Place; Chicago, Illinois; 60637 U.S.
- Coordinates: 41°47′31″N 87°36′26″W
- Type: History museum, Art museum
- Chair: Carol Mosely Braun
- President: Perri L. Irmer
- Website: www.dusablemuseum.org

The DuSable Black History Museum and Education Center, formerly the DuSable Museum of African American History, is a museum in Chicago, Illinois, United States, dedicated to the study and conservation of African-American history, culture, and art.

It was named after Jean Baptiste Point du Sable. It was founded in 1961 by Margaret Taylor-Burroughs, her husband Charles Burroughs, Gerard Lew, Eugene Feldman, Bernard Goss, Marian M. Hadley, and others. They established the museum to celebrate black culture, at the time overlooked by most museums and academic establishments. The museum has an affiliation with the Smithsonian Institution.

== History ==
=== Founding ===
The DuSable Black History Museum was chartered on February 16, 1961. Its origins as the Ebony Museum of Negro History and Art began in the work of Margaret and Charles Burroughs, Bernard Goss, and others to correct the perceived omission of black history and culture in the education establishment. The museum was originally located on the ground floor of the Burroughses' home at 3806 S. Michigan Avenue. In 1968, the museum was renamed for Jean Baptiste Point du Sable, a fur trader of black African ancestry and the first non-Native-American permanent settler in Chicago. During the 1960s, the museum and the South Side Community Art Center, which was located across the street, founded in 1941 by Taylor-Burroughs and dedicated by Eleanor Roosevelt, formed an African-American cultural corridor. This original museum site had previously been a social club and boarding house for African-American railroad workers and is now listed as a Chicago Landmark and on the National Register of Historic Places.

The DuSable Black History Museum quickly filled a void caused by limited cultural resources then available to African Americans in Chicago. It became an educational resource for African-American history and culture and a focal point in Chicago for black social activism. The museum has hosted political fundraisers, community festivals, and various events serving the black community. The museum's model has been emulated in numerous other cities around the country, including Boston, Los Angeles, and Philadelphia.

=== Expansion ===
In 1973, the Chicago Park District donated the usage of a park administration building in Washington Park as the site for the museum. The current location once served as a lockup facility for the Chicago Police Department. In 1993, the museum expanded with the addition of a new wing named in honor of the late Mayor Harold Washington, the first African-American mayor of Chicago. In 2004, the original building became a contributing building to the Washington Park United States Registered Historic District which is a National Register of Historic Places listing.

The DuSable Black History Museum is the oldest, and—before the founding of the National Museum of African American History and Culture in 2016—the largest caretaker of African-American culture in the United States. Over its long history, it has expanded as necessary to reflect the increased interest in black culture. This willingness to adapt has allowed it to survive while other museums faltered due to a weakening economy and decreased public support. The museum was the eighth one located on Park District land. Although it focuses on exhibiting African-American culture, it is one of several Chicago museums that celebrates Chicago's ethnic and cultural heritage.

Antoinette Wright, director of the DuSable Black History Museum, has said that African-American art has grown out of a need for the culture to preserve its history orally and in art due to historical obstacles to other forms of documentation. She also believes that the museum serves as a motivational tool for members of a culture that has experienced extensive negativity. In the 1980s, African-American museums such as the DuSable endured the controversy of whether negative aspects of the cultural history should be memorialized. In the 1990s, the African-American genre of museum began to flourish despite financial difficulties. In 2016, the museum formed an affiliation with the Smithsonian Institution.

== Collection ==
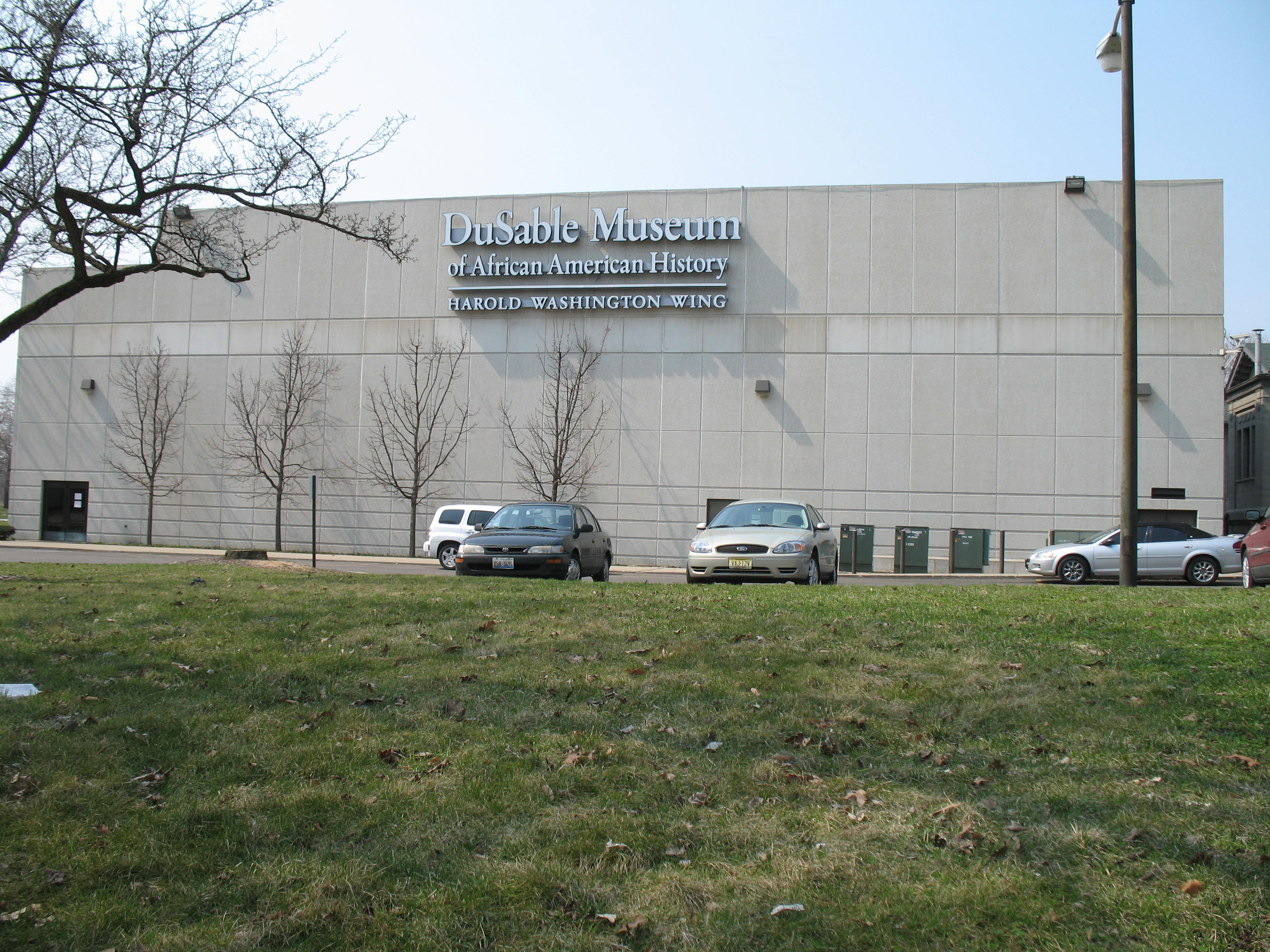
The Harold Washington Wing

The new wing contains a permanent exhibit on Washington with memorabilia, personal effects and surveys highlights of his political career. The museum also serves as the city's primary memorial to du Sable. Highlights of its collection include the desk of activist Ida B. Wells, the violin of poet Paul Laurence Dunbar, and the Charles Dawson Papers.

The museum has a collection of 13,000 artifacts, books, photographs, art objects, and memorabilia. The DuSable collection has come largely from private gifts. It has United States slavery-era relics, nineteenth- and twentieth-century artifacts, and archival materials, including the diaries of sea explorer Captain Harry Dean. The DuSable collection includes works from scholar W. E. B. Du Bois, sociologist St. Clair Drake, and poet Langston Hughes. The African-American art collection contains selections from the South Side Community Art Center students Charles White, Richard Hunt, Archibald Motley, Jr., Gus Nall, Charles Sebree, and Marion Perkins, as well as numerous New Deal Works Progress Administration period and 1960s Black Arts Movement works. The museum also owns prints and drawings by Henry O. Tanner, Richmond Barthé, and Romare Bearden, and has an extensive collection of books and records pertaining to African and African-American history and culture.

== Facilities ==
The original north entrance contains the main lobby of the museum and features the Thomas Miller mosaics, which honor the institution's founders. The building was designed c. 1915 by D.H. Burnham and Company to serve as the South Park Administration Building in Washington Park on the city's South Side. The new wing is 25,000 square feet (2,300 m^{2}). The museum has a 466-seat auditorium, which is part of the new wing, that hosts community-related events, such as a jazz and blues music series, poetry readings, film screenings, and other cultural events. The museum also has a gift shop and a research library. The museum's funding is partially dependent upon a Chicago Park District tax levy.

After the 1993 expansion of the new wing, the museum contained 50,000 square feet (4,600 m^{2}) of exhibition space. The $4 million expansion was funded by a $2 million matching funds grant from city and state officials. In addition, the museum has been working on preserving and expanding facilities in a nearby architecturally significant roundhouse.

In 2026, the museum announced it would be receiving $1.6 million in state grant for renovations.

== Key people ==
- Carol Moseley Braun, Board Chair (April 2025 - )
- Perri L. Irmer, President and CEO (September 2015 - )

== See also ==
- Barzillai Lew – Lew Family
- List of museums focused on African Americans
- List of museums and cultural institutions in Chicago
- Funky Turns 40: Black Character Revolution
