= Charlemae Hill Rollins =

American librarian (1987–1979)

- Born: June 20, 1897; Yazoo City, Mississippi, US
- Died: February 3, 1979 (aged 81); Chicago, Illinois, US
- Occupation: Librarian
- Writing career
- Notable works: We Build Together: A Reader's Guide to Negro Life and Literature for Elementary and High School Use

Charlemae Hill Rollins (June 20, 1897 – February 3, 1979) was a pioneering librarian, writer, and storyteller in the area of African American literature. During her 31 years as head librarian of the children's department at the Chicago Public Library as well as after her retirement, she instituted substantial reforms in children's literature.

== Life ==
Rollins was born in Yazoo City, Mississippi, to Allen G. Hill, a farmer, and Birdie Tucker Hill, a teacher. Her family moved to Beggs in Oklahoma Territory hoping to find better living conditions, but discovered that black children were excluded from attending school. Undeterred, Rollins's family founded a school which Rollins attended.

After completing her elementary education, Rollins attended black high schools in St. Louis, Missouri, Holly Springs, Mississippi, and Quindoro, Kansas, where she graduated in 1916. After earning her teaching certificate, she taught at the school her family had set up before leaving to attend Howard University. She returned after a year to marry Joseph Walter Rollins on April 8, 1918. The couple moved to Chicago in 1919, after Joseph returned from World War I. Their son, Joseph Walter Rollins Jr., was born in 1920.

Rollins became a children's librarian at the Chicago Public Library in 1927. Initially, she worked at the Hardin Square Branch Library, where she became known as a prolific storyteller. Though she did not earn a degree, Rollins received library training from Columbia College in the summer of 1932, and the graduate library program of the University of Chicago from 1934 to 1936. It is not surprising Rollins chose to concentrate in children's literature, calling learning to read at a young age "the best thing I ever did." Rollins's grandmother, a former slave, gave her books and encouraged her to read, helping to inspire Rollins to become a librarian.

Chicago's Black population swelled as more families moved north for better education, work, and living conditions. Racism (de jure and de facto) was rampant, with racial tensions and racial discrimination intensifying since 1915 and culminating in events like the Chicago Race Riot of 1919. In such an atmosphere, no library was founded for the community until the George Cleveland Hall Branch Library opened in 1932. The first branch built in a black neighborhood, the library had a variety of patrons from various racial & economic groups. Rollins became the head of the children's department, where she worked until retiring in 1963.

Rollins worked with the library director, Vivian G. Harsh, to make the library welcoming to the multicultural, socioeconomically diverse patrons. Under their guidance, the library hosted discussion groups, lectures, a Negro History Club, and book fairs. In addition to her work with children, Rollins also set up a reading guidance clinic for parents. Black writers who visited the library included Richard Wright, Zora Neale Hurston, Margaret Walker, and Langston Hughes, with whom Rollins developed a friendship.

In addition to these contributions to librarianship, Rollins taught at Morgan College in Baltimore and summers at Fisk University in Nashville, Tennessee. She also taught a course in Children's Literature at Roosevelt University from 1949 to 1979.

Rollins died on February 3, 1979, at the age of 81.

== Literature reforms ==
Much of the literature available to young children in the earlier half of the twentieth century was rife with stereotypical portrayals of blacks, including false dialects, illustrations, and offensive words. While many libraries nationwide did not have a segregationist agenda, neither were they quick to invite blacks to utilize the collections.

Rollins crusaded to change the content in many children's and young adult books to accurately portray black life. Her first publication in 1941, We Build Together: A Reader's Guide to Negro Life and Literature for Elementary and High School Use, is a bibliography of books suitable for young African American children that sought to eliminate negative black stereotypes. Biographies, nonfiction, and sports genres are represented alongside picture and fiction books for children and young adults.

Rollins was primarily concerned with providing materials that portrayed African Americans in a positive light, as well as materials by and about blacks. We Build Together was written to create an index of “books that Negro children could enjoy without self-consciousness, books with which they could identify satisfactorily, books that white children could read and so learn what Negro young people and families were like.” She also believed that positive black literature could also help foster tolerance between races by knocking these stereotypical conceptions down. We Build Together cemented Rollins's reputation as a prominent leader in children's literature. Publishers began sending her copies of books to evaluate.

Rollins was a storyteller. In “The Art of Storytelling,” she wrote, "Storytelling is a wonderful way of breaking down barriers, or getting acquainted with new people, and drawing groups and individuals together." Her stories were based on positive news articles about blacks, folk tales, or stories her grandmother had told her.

After retiring, Rollins turned her hand to writing. She published Christmas Gif': An Anthology of Christmas Poems, Songs and Stories Written by and about Negroes in 1963. Her passion for storytelling is reflected in the variety of excerpts from Paul Laurence Dunbar, Booker T. Washington, and Gwendolyn Brooks.

The rest of Rollins's books were biographies, in keeping with her sentiment that they were the best kind of books for young children: “[The genre] includes the greatest number of Negro authors. It is here that all children can build a firm foundation of knowledge of and respect for Negroes. They will be prepared for the first introduction to the concept of different skin color…They now can feel that America is indeed their country.”

== Leadership ==
Rollins served as president of the Children's Services Division of the American Library Association from 1957 to 1958. She was the first black librarian to hold the position. She also chaired the Jane Addams Children's Book Award Committee for the Women's International League for Peace and Freedom, as well as the Newbery-Caldecott Award Committee from 1956–1957. Rollins served on the advisory committee for the Bulletin of the Center for Children's Books at the University of Chicago from 1941–1977.

Rollins’s bibliographical work, publications, collection development, outreach, and storytelling represented both acts of community care and contributions to the long Black freedom struggle.

== Books ==
In all, Rollins wrote or co-wrote six books:

- We Build Together: A Reader's Guide to Negro Life and Literature for Elementary and High School Use, 1941
- Christmas Gif', an Anthology of Christmas Poems, Songs and Stories Written by and about Negroes, 1963
- They Showed the Way: Forty American Negro Leaders, 1964
- Famous American Negro Poets, 1965
- Famous Negro Entertainers of Stage, Screen, and TV, 1967
- Black Troubadour: Langston Hughes, 1971

She also edited and contributed to many other works.

== Honors and awards ==
Rollins received American Library Association Honorary Membership in 1972, the first African American to do so. On October 21, 1989, the children's room at the Hall Branch Library was named in Rollins' honor. The Charlemae Hill Rollins Colloquium is held twice a year at North Carolina Central University, where attendees discuss how to improve library services for children.

The Association for Library Service to Children (ALSC), a division of the American Library Association, honored Rollins by naming their annual President's Program after the former ALSC President. The program takes place annually at the American Library Association's Annual Conference.

Rollins was honored by Columbia College in 1974 with a doctorate of humane letters. Despite her long career promoting education, this was the first degree she had ever received.

Additionally, she received:

- American Brotherhood Award, National Conference of Christians and Jews, 1952
- American Library Association Letter, 1953
- Grolier Society Award, 1955
- Woman of the Year, Zeta Phi Beta, 1956
- Honorary membership in Phi Delta Kappa, 1959
- Good American Award of the Chicago Committee of One-hundred, 1962
- Three (3) Negro Centennial Awards, 1963
- Children's Reading Round Table Award, 1963
- Constance Lindsay Skinner Award, Women's National Book Association 1970
- The Coretta Scott King Award in 1971 for her biography Black Troubadour: Langston Hughes
- Torchbearers Award of Alpha Kappa Alpha sorority, 1972
- Plaque from the Black Librarians' Caucus, 1976
