= Chicago Public Library =

Library system in Illinois, United States

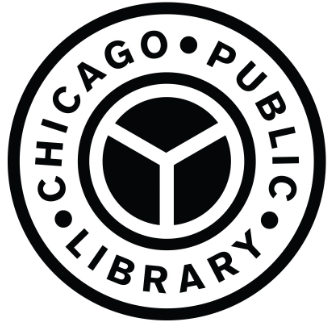
- The library seal contains the Y-shaped Chicago municipal device

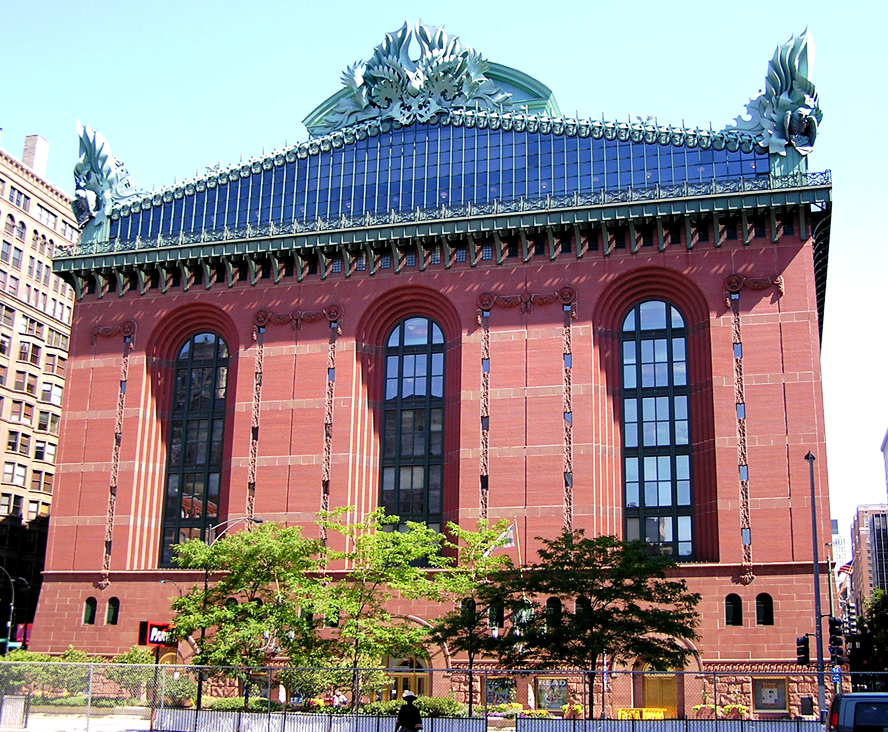
- Harold Washington Library – Chicago's Central Public Library
- Location: Chicago, Illinois, United States
- Established: 1873; 153 years ago
- Branches: 81

Collection
- Size: 5,721,334 volumes (July 2010, ALA data)

Access and use
- Circulation: 10 million
- Population served: 2.8 million

Other information
- Budget: $106 million
- Director: Chris Brown
- Employees: 958
- Website: chipublib.org

The Chicago Public Library (CPL) is the municipal public library system of the City of Chicago in Illinois, United States. It consists of 82 locations, including a central library, three regional libraries, and branch libraries distributed throughout the city's 77 community areas. The Chicago Public Library system was founded in 1872, in the wake of the Great Chicago Fire.

The American Library Association reports that the library holds 5,721,334 volumes, making it the ninth largest public library in the United States by volumes held, and the 30th largest academic or public library in the United States by volumes held. The Chicago Public Library is the second largest library system in Chicago by volumes held (the largest being the University of Chicago Library). The library is the second largest public library system in the Midwest, after the Detroit Public Library. Unlike many public libraries, CPL uses the Library of Congress classification system instead of Dewey Decimal Classification.

== History ==
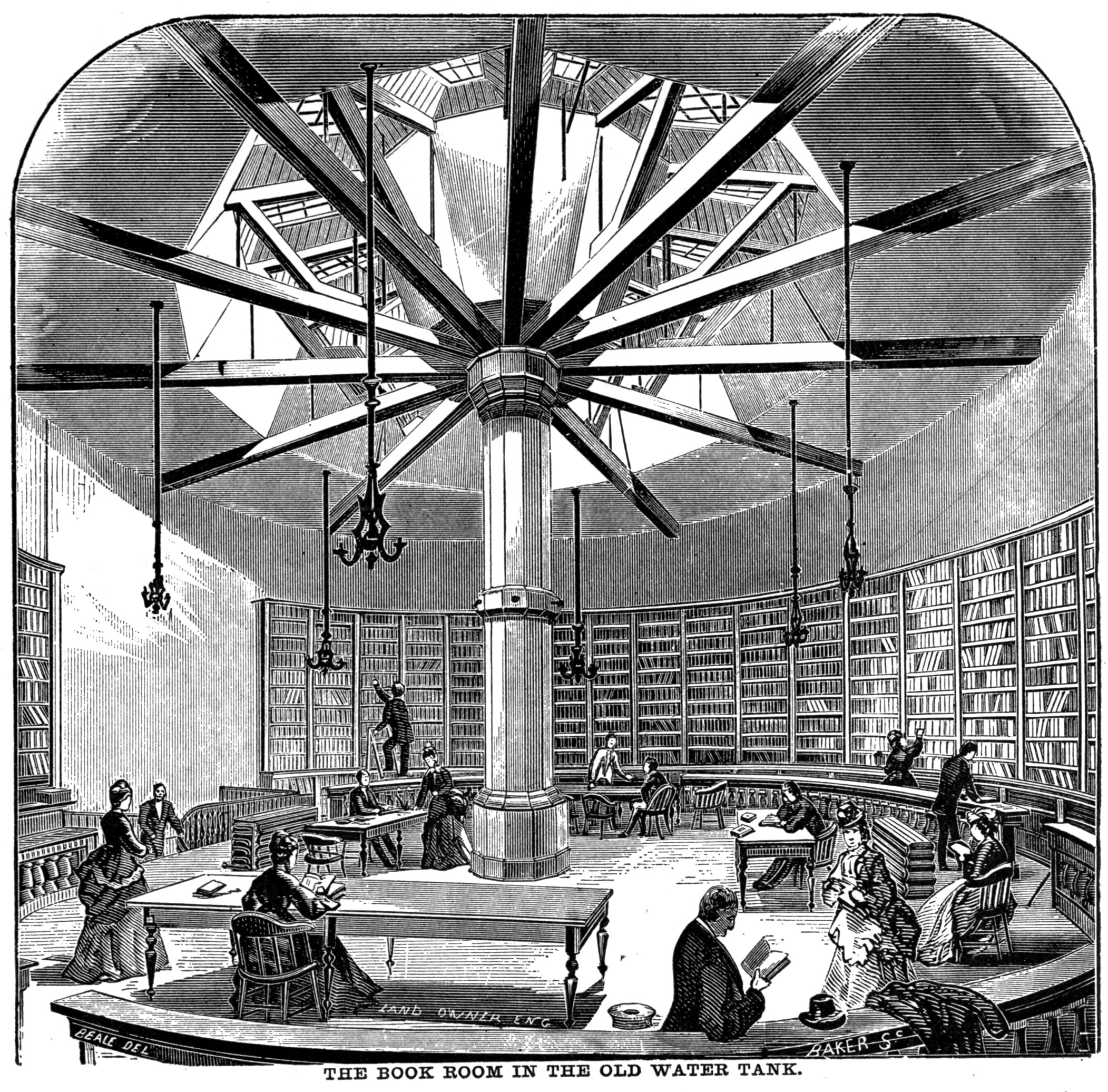
The original library, inside the old water tower on the site that is now the Rookery Building.

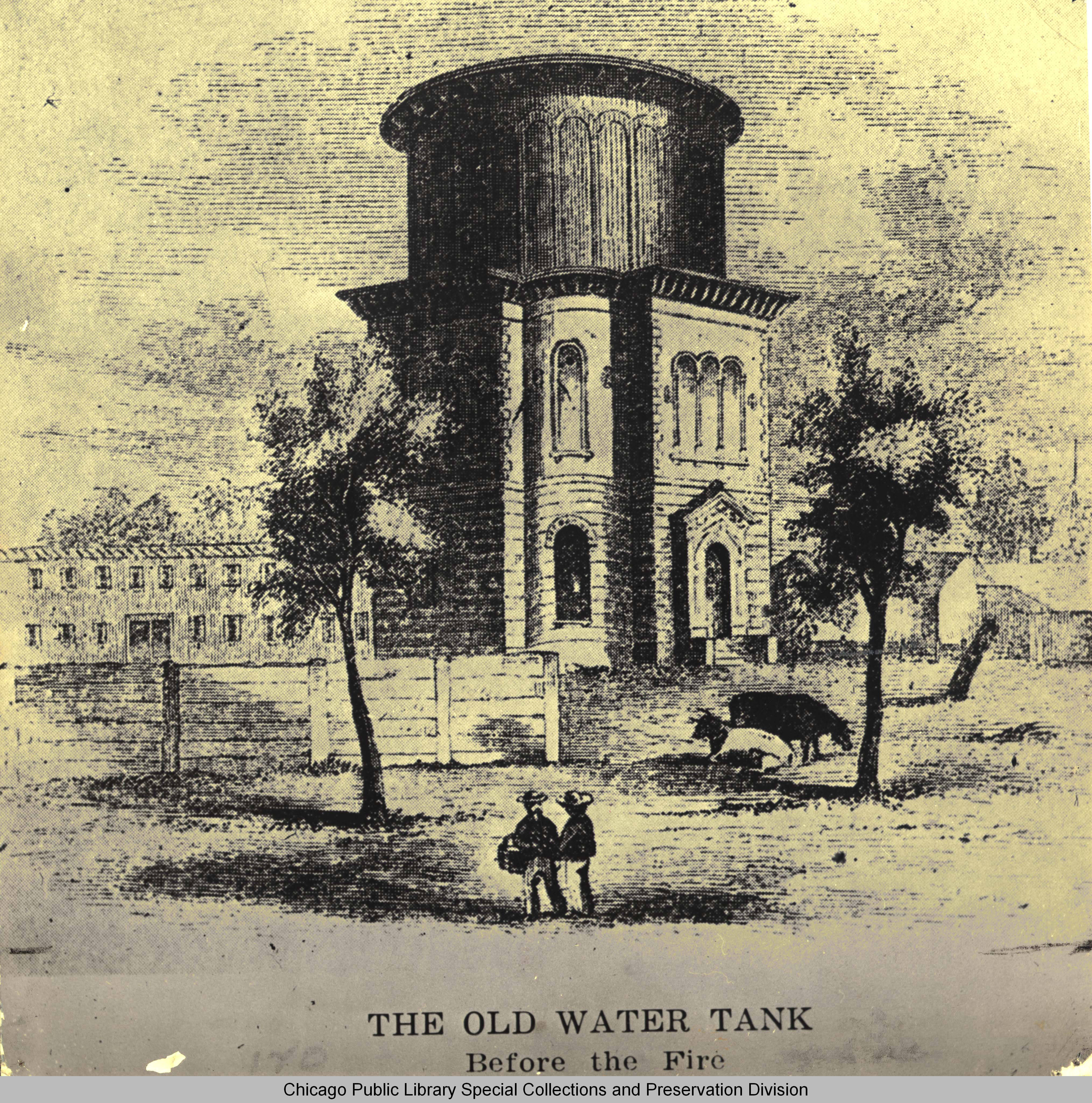
This former water tower was the site of the original public library, exterior view

In the aftermath of the 1871 Great Chicago Fire, Londoner A.H. Burgess, with the aid of Thomas Hughes, drew up what would be called the "English Book Donation", which proposed that England should provide a free library to the burnt-out city. The Chicago Public Library was created directly from the ashes of the great Chicago Fire. Burgess wrote on December 7, 1871 in The Daily News that "I propose that England should present a Free Library to Chicago, to remain there as a mark of sympathy now, and a keepsake and a token of true brotherly kindness forever ..."

After circulating requests for donations throughout English society, the project donated 8,000 books. Private donors included Queen Victoria, Benjamin Disraeli, Alfred Lord Tennyson, Robert Browning, John Stuart Mill, John Ruskin, and Matthew Arnold.

In Chicago, town leaders petitioned Mayor Joseph Medill to hold a meeting and establish the library. The meeting led to the Illinois Library Act of 1872, which allowed Illinois cities to establish tax-supported libraries. In April 1872, the Chicago City Council passed an ordinance establishing the Chicago Public Library. In the rebuilding section of the city, on January 1, 1873, the Chicago Public Library officially opened its doors in an abandoned iron water tank at LaSalle and Adams Streets. The collection included 3,157 volumes. The water tank was 58 feet (18 m) in diameter, 21 feet (6.4 m) high and with a 30-foot (9.1 m) foundation. A two-story office building was soon built around it to hold city offices, and a third floor reading room was built for the library.

On October 24, 1873, William Frederick Poole was elected the first head librarian by the library's board of directors. Poole was mainly concerned during his tenure on building the circulation. In 1874, circulation services began with 13,000 out of 17,533 available for lending. The library moved from place to place during its first 24 years. Eleven years it spent on the fourth floor of city hall. In 1887, Poole resigned to organize the private, research Newberry Library of Chicago.

On October 15, 1887, Frederick H. Hild was elected the second Librarian of the Chicago Public Library and securing a permanent home was his primary drive. Ten years later, the Central Library was opened. Designed by the Boston firm of Shepley, Rutan and Coolidge in the same academic classical style as their building for the Art Institute of Chicago, it is located on Michigan Avenue between Washington Street and Randolph Street on land donated by the Grand Army of the Republic, a Civil War Veterans group led by John A. Logan, a Civil War General and U.S. Senator from Illinois. In return for the land, the Library was to maintain a Civil War collection and exhibit in a G.A.R. room until the last northern Civil War veteran died. The library would remain on this site for the next 96 years. The building is now the Chicago Cultural Center.

Henry Eduard Legler assumed the leadership of the Chicago Public Library on October 11, 1909. Previously a Wisconsin Progressive, he was well known as an aggressive advocate of the expansion of library service. In 1916, Legler presented his "Library Plan for the Whole City", the first comprehensive branch library system in the nation. A landmark in library history, the plan called for an extensive network of neighborhood library locations throughout Chicago. The goal of the plan was to bring "library service within the walking distance of home for every person in Chicago who can read or wants to use books." Legler was succeeded by his assistant Carl B. Roden in 1918. Roden served as Chief Librarian until 1950. The South Chicago Branch library history from 1937-1947 has been explored by Latham who focused on its service to an industrial community and adult education. She has also examined the role of the John Toman Branch library from 1927-1940.

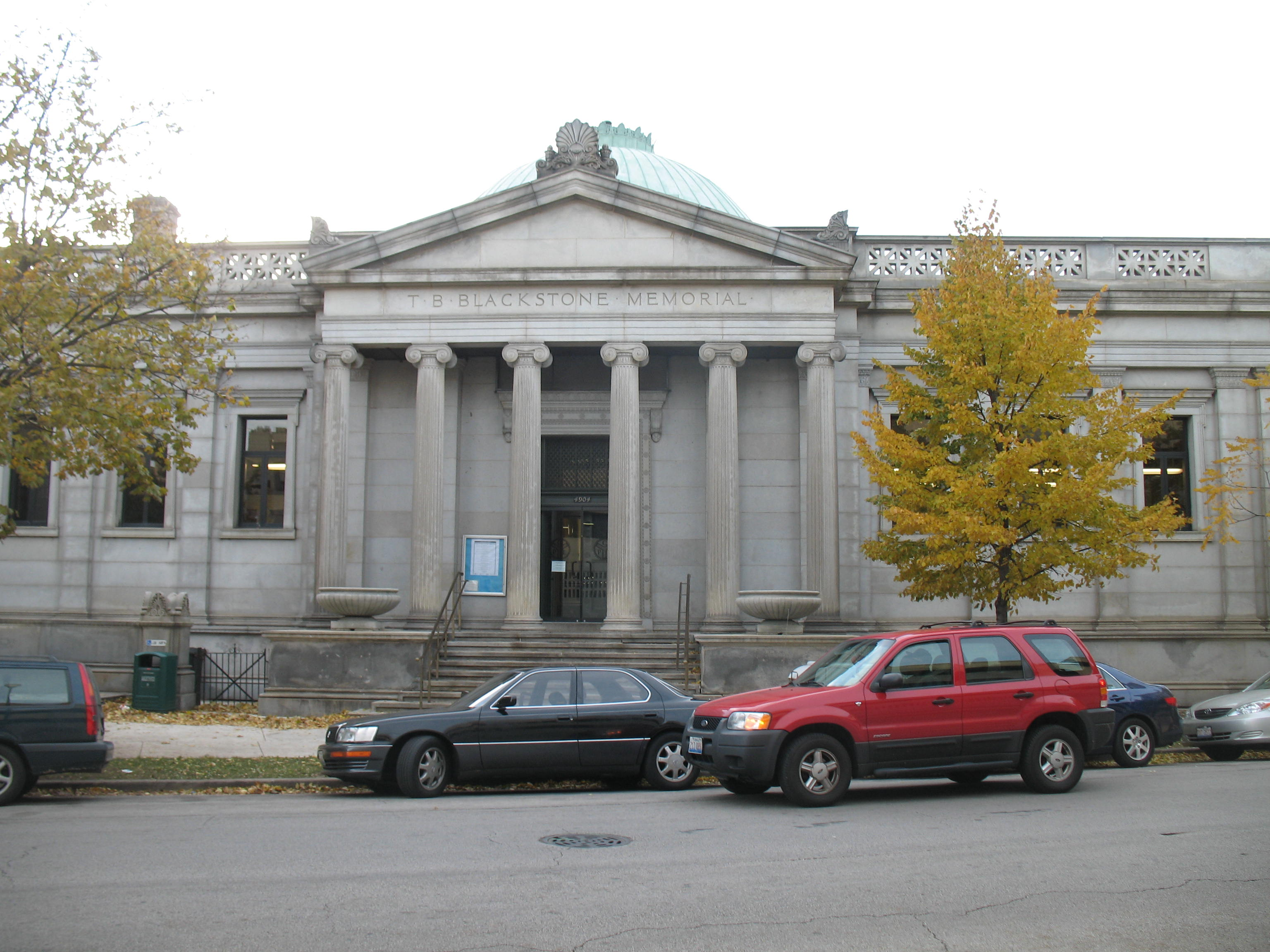
The Blackstone Library built in 1904 is one of the oldest library buildings in the city and the CPL's first branch library

Roden was succeeded in 1951 by Chief Librarian Gertrude E. Gscheidle. During her tenure the Library expanded its service to Chicago's neighborhoods by modernizing its bookmobile services.

Like many other metropolitan public library systems in the late 1960s and early 1970s, the Chicago Public Library utilized federal funding from the Library Services and Construction Act of 1964 in outreach efforts to formerly underserved groups during the federal War on Poverty under director Alex Ladenson, exanding multilingual collections and reference services, renovating and opening storefront branch libraries in lower income neighborhoods, and piloting community engagement programs in neighborhoods targeted for improved city services in the War on Poverty.

The two-story, 62,000-square-foot (5,800 m^{2}) modernist Carter G. Woodson Regional Library, named after the "Father of Modern Black Historiography," opened its doors in December 1975, to serve as the South Side. A decade later, Chicago Public Library replaced its north side regional library when the post-modernist Conrad Sulzer Regional Library opened to the public in late 1985. The Woodson regional branch library features the Vivian G. Harsh Research Collection, one of the largest repositories of African-American archival information in the Midwest. It holds the papers of many notable Chicagoans, such as John H. Sengstacke, Robert S. Abbott, Doris E. Saunders, Timuel Black, Rev. Addie L. Wyatt, and numerous others.

In 1974, the board of directors authorized an $11 million renovation of the Central Library. While the restoration of the original central library proved a great success, the collections remained warehoused outside the old library while the City debated the status of the future of the central library. One plan was to move the library to the former Rothchild/Goldblatts Department Store which stood empty on Chicago's State Street and had reverted to City ownership.

From 1982 to 1985, Amanda Sullivan Randle Rudd rose to become the first African-American to head of the Chicago Public Library system. Rudd had experienced segregated libraries during her childhood in South Carolina. Her stewardship in Chicago saw a particular focus on literacy services, and she strongly mentored younger colleagues, including a future Librarian of Congress, Carla Hayden.

The Chicago Sun-Times editorial board and Cindy Pritzker, then President of the Library Board, launched a grassroots campaign to build a new state-of-the-art central library. On July 29, 1987, Mayor Harold Washington and the Chicago City Council authorized a design and construction competition for a new, one-and-a-half block $144 million library at 400 South State Street.

== Current services ==
In 1991, the Harold Washington Library Center became Chicago's new central library. It is named for the late mayor Harold Washington. It was the world's largest municipal public library at the time of its opening. It is accessible from the Brown, Orange, Purple and Pink Line trains at the "Library" stop, from the Blue Line at the "LaSalle" and "Jackson" stops, as well as from the Red Line at the "Jackson" stop.

In January 1994, Mary A. Dempsey was appointed Library Commissioner by Mayor Richard M. Daley and served in that role until January 2012. Under her direction, the Library launched the largest branch building program in its history, constructing or renovating 44 branch libraries; installed more than 2500 free public access computers and Wi-Fi throughout the library system; completed 2 strategic plans; established professional development and training programs for all library staff; and launched signature programs such as One Book, One Chicago; YOUmedia; the museum and Ravinia free admission programs; Teen Volume; Law at the Library; and Money Smart financial literacy programs for adults and teens. The library's success in revitalizing communities through branch library development was analyzed by Robert Putnam in 2003.

The "Charlotte Kim Scholar in Residence Program" took place from 1999–2008. Scholars included Camila Alire (1999); Leigh S. Estabrook (2002); Kathleen de la Peña McCook (2003); Joan C. Durrance (2004); Michael Stephens (2005); Maureen Sullivan (2006); George Needham (2007) and Patricia Martin (2008).

The Engaged Library: Chicago Stories of Community Building published by the Urban Library Council (2006) highlights several Chicago public libraries and their efforts in strengthening the community and effectively enhancing the well-being and capacities of urban neighborhood residents, associations, non-profits and public institutions.

Brian Andrew Bannon was appointed Library Commissioner effective March 2012.

Some of the free programming the Chicago Public Library offers include: The One Book, One Chicago program, The Summer Learning Challenge, Bookamania (held every November), Kids Museum Passport Program (allows patrons free admission to a variety of Chicago's world-class institutions), and Words and Music Program (which provides patrons with free lawn tickets to selected Ravinia concerts). The library also offers a free homework help desk daily in order to serve struggling students after school.

The Chicago Public Library offers free lecture series covering a variety of topics including: Law at the Library (a free monthly lecture series that offers participants the opportunity to speak with a legal professional about a variety of legal topics), Money Smart (a series of financial literacy programs), and Author Series.

The Chicago Public Library provides access to a large selection of databases, most of which are also available for use at home or other remote location with a Chicago Public Library card. Internet computers are available for anyone with a Chicago Public Library card. Also, anyone can use the Wi-Fi on their own laptops, tablets and smartphones without a library card.

In June 2013, the library announced a $1 million grant from the Bill & Melinda Gates Foundation establishing a partnership between the Chicago Public Library and the public library system of Aarhus, Denmark.

That same month, the Library opened its Innovation Lab, featuring a Maker Lab with 3D software, milling machine, laser cutters, and 3D printers. The space has proven highly successful in offering free access to the latest in advanced manufacturing technology and was awarded the Chicago Innovation Awards Social Innovator Award in October 2013.

In late 2013, a study released by the Information Science Department of Heinrich Heine University in Düsseldorf, Germany ranked Chicago Public Library first in the United States and third in the world, when comparing 31 major urban libraries taking leadership roles in supporting "smart cities" in a "knowledge economy."

Andrea Telli was appointed Library Commissioner effective June 2019.

In 2019, CPL became the largest public library system in the United States to eliminate fines for borrowed overdue items. All existing fines were forgiven. There are still due dates, and patrons are still required to return items or replace them to continue their borrowing privileges.

Chris Brown was appointed Library Commissioner effective February 2021.

In 2023, the CPL celebrated its 150th anniversary with an exhibit exploring the history of its branches.

On June 19, 2026, the 82nd CPL branch library opened at the Barack Obama Presidential Center.

== Branches ==
=== Central library ===
Harold Washington Library Center

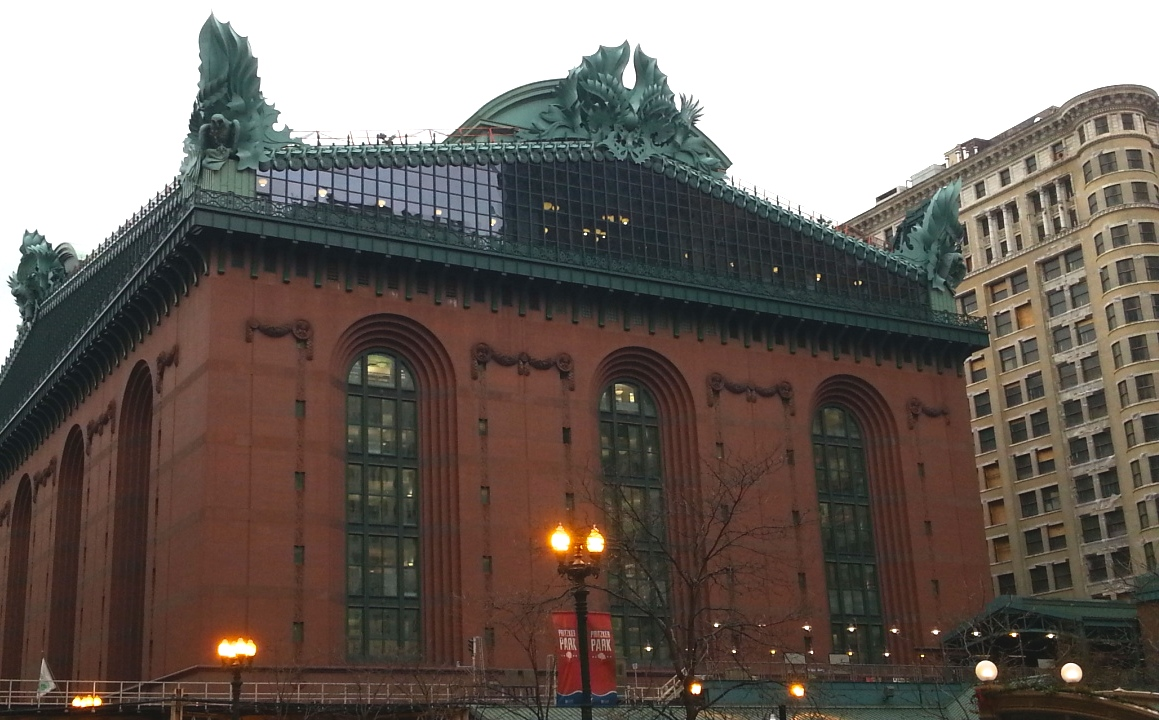
Harold Washington Library Center – in the Loop

=== Regional libraries ===
==== North ====
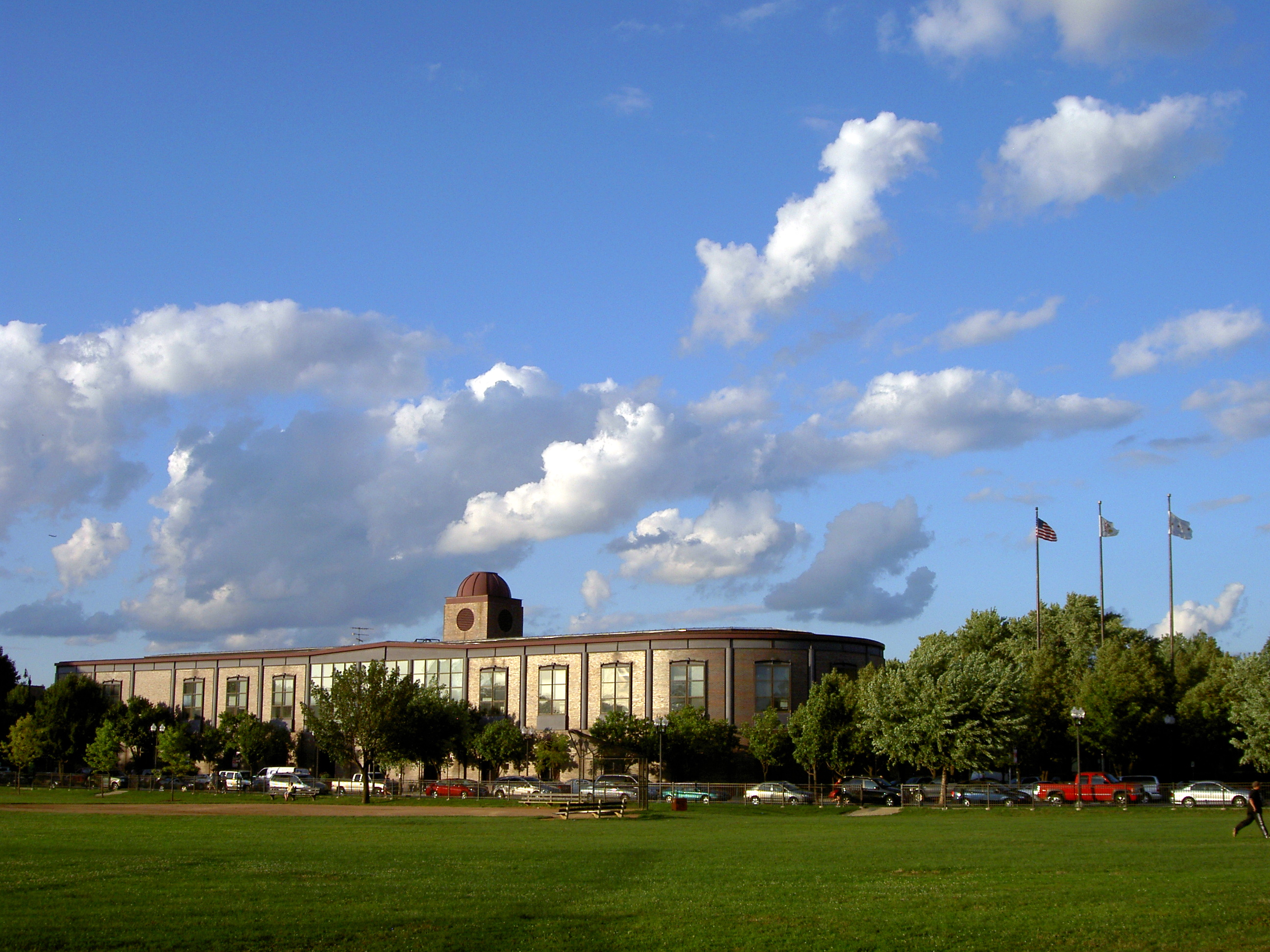
Conrad Sulzer Regional Library – North

- Sulzer Regional Library

==== South ====
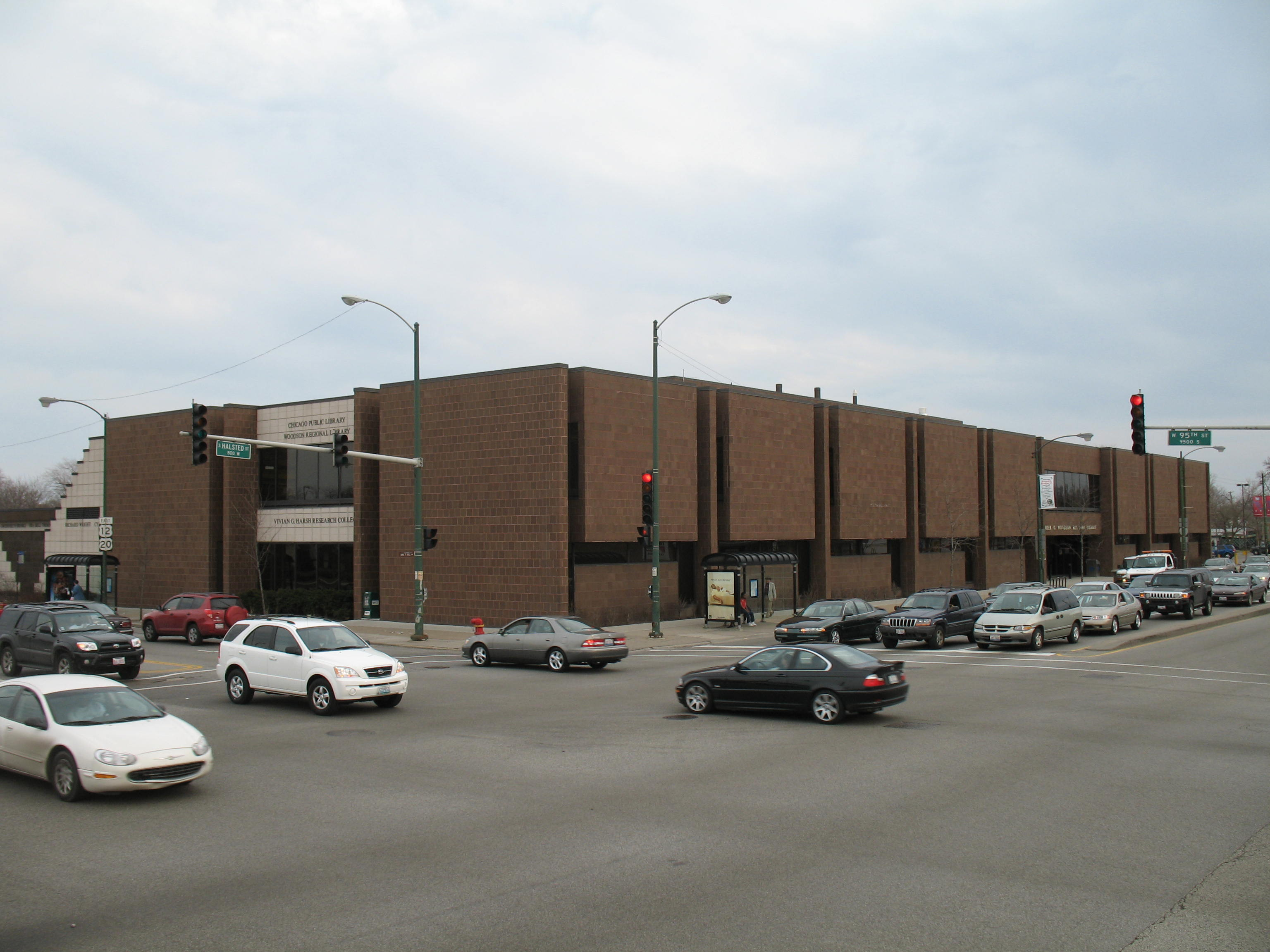
Carter G. Woodson Regional Library – South

- Woodson Regional Library

==== West ====
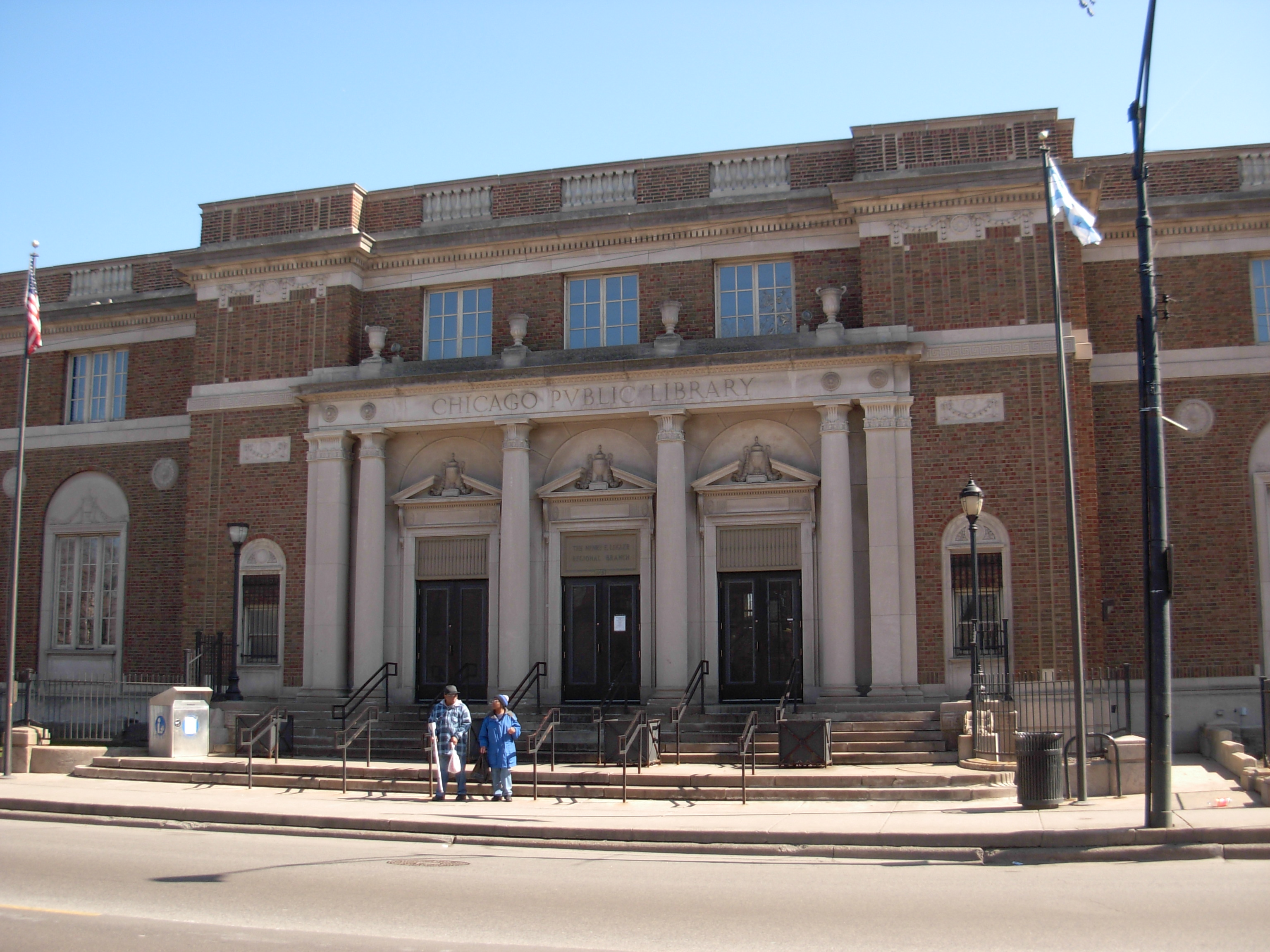
Henry E. Legler Regional Library – West

- Legler Regional Library

=== Branches ===
==== North District ====
- Albany Park Branch
- Austin-Irving Branch
- Harold Bezazian Branch (Uptown)
- Bucktown-Wicker Park Branch
- Budlong Woods Branch
- Richard M. Daley (West Humboldt Park) Branch
- Dunning Branch
- Edgebrook Branch
- Edgewater Branch
- Galewood-Mont Clare Branch
- Humboldt Park Branch
- Independence Branch
- Jefferson Park Branch
- Lincoln-Belmont Branch
- Lincoln Park Branch
- Logan Square Branch
- Mayfair Branch
- John Merlo Branch
- North Austin Branch
- North Pulaski Branch
- Northtown Branch
- Oriole Park Branch
- Portage-Cragin Branch
- Roden Branch
- Rogers Park Branch
- Uptown Branch
- West Belmont Branch

==== Central District ====
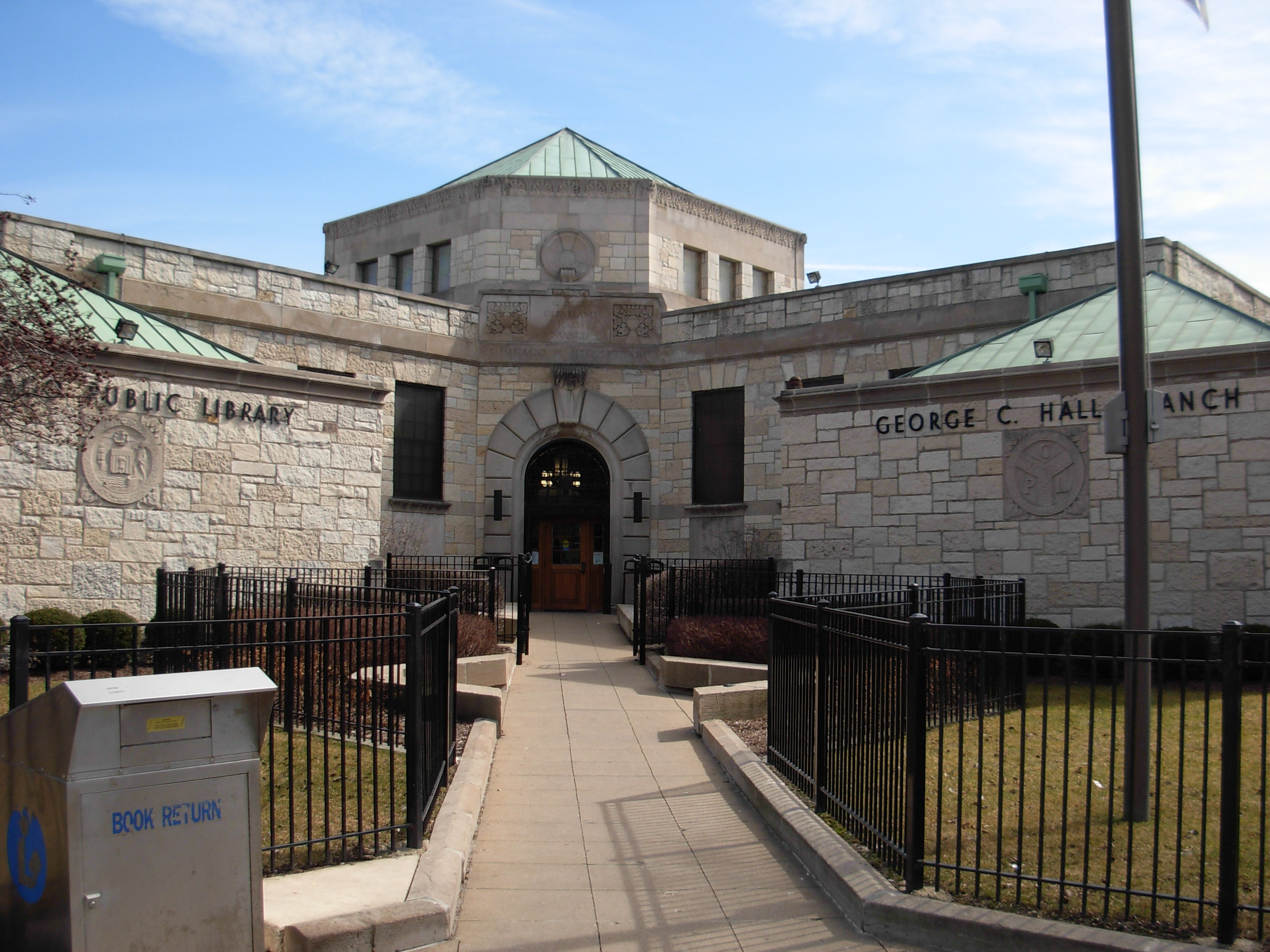
George C. Hall Branch

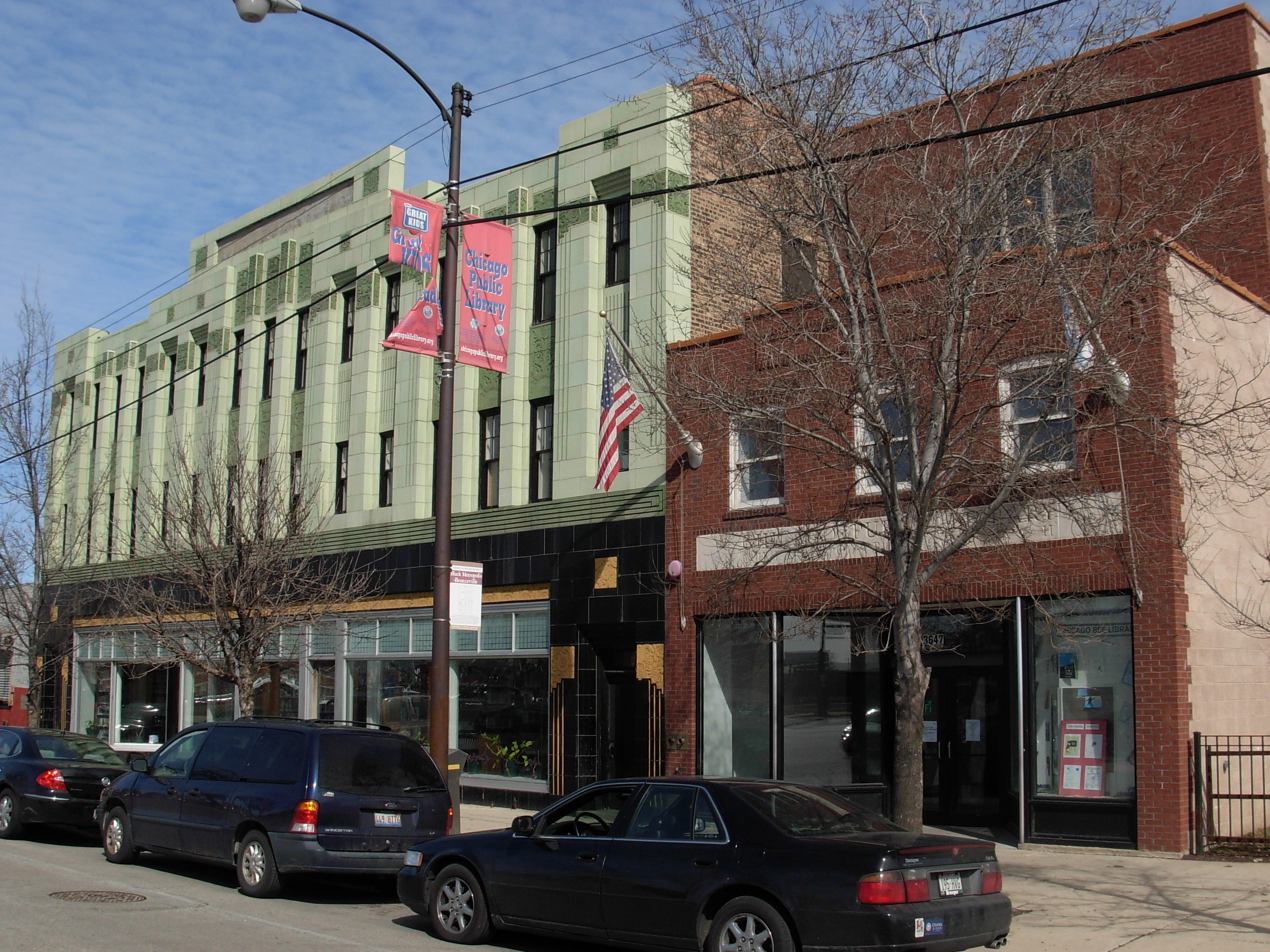
Chicago Bee Branch

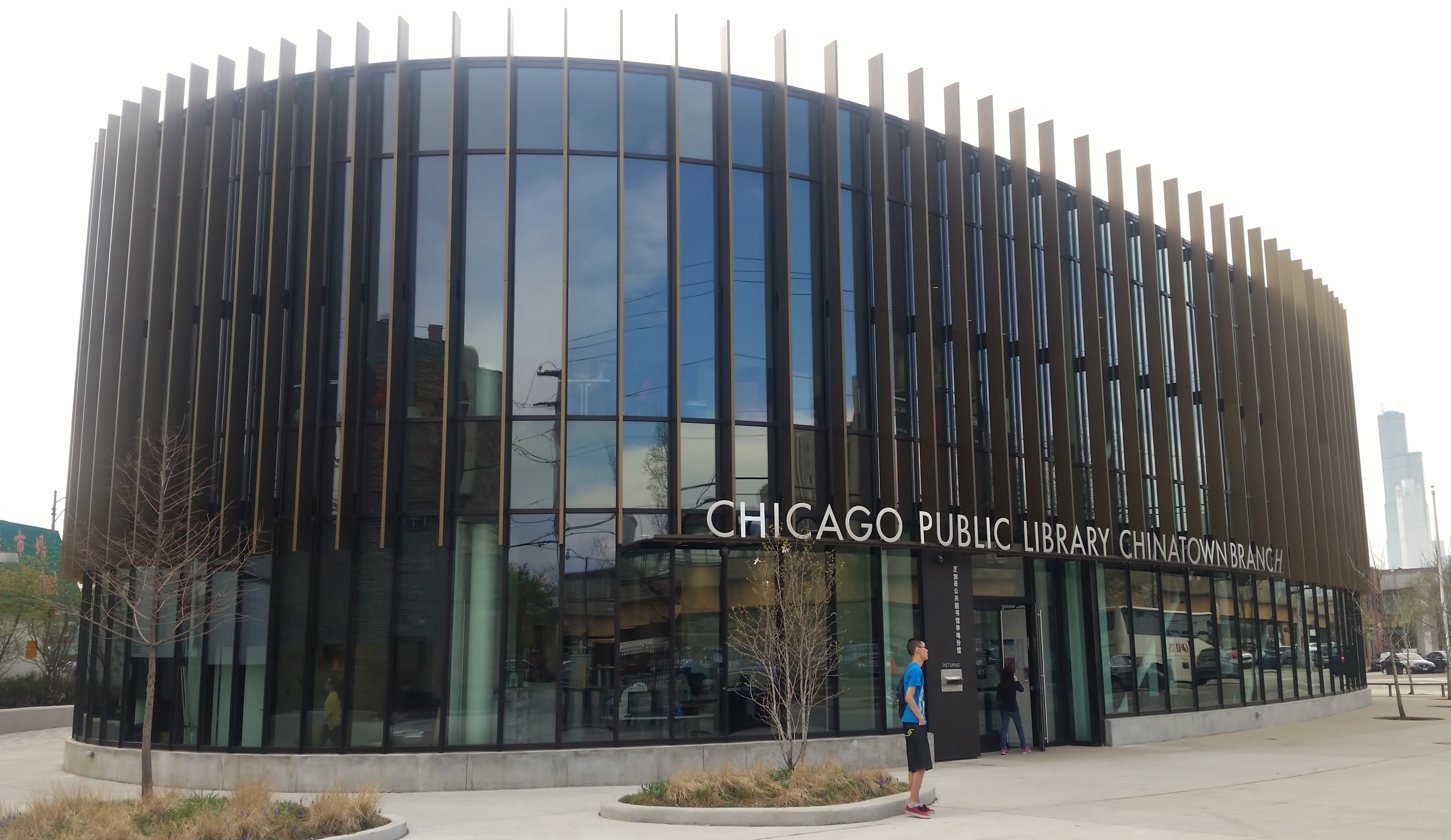
Chinatown Branch

- Austin Branch
- Back of the Yards Branch
- Blackstone Branch
- Brighton Park Branch
- Canaryville Branch
- Chicago Bee Branch
- Chinatown Branch
- Richard J. Daley Branch
- Douglass Branch
- Gage Park Branch
- Garfield Ridge Branch
- George Cleveland Hall Branch
- Martin Luther King, Jr. Branch
- Little Italy Branch
- Little Village Branch
- Rudy Lozano Branch
- Mabel Manning Branch
- McKinley Park Branch
- Near North Branch
- Sherman Park Branch
- Toman Branch
- Water Works Outpost
- West Chicago Avenue Branch
- West Loop Branch
- West Town Branch

==== South District ====
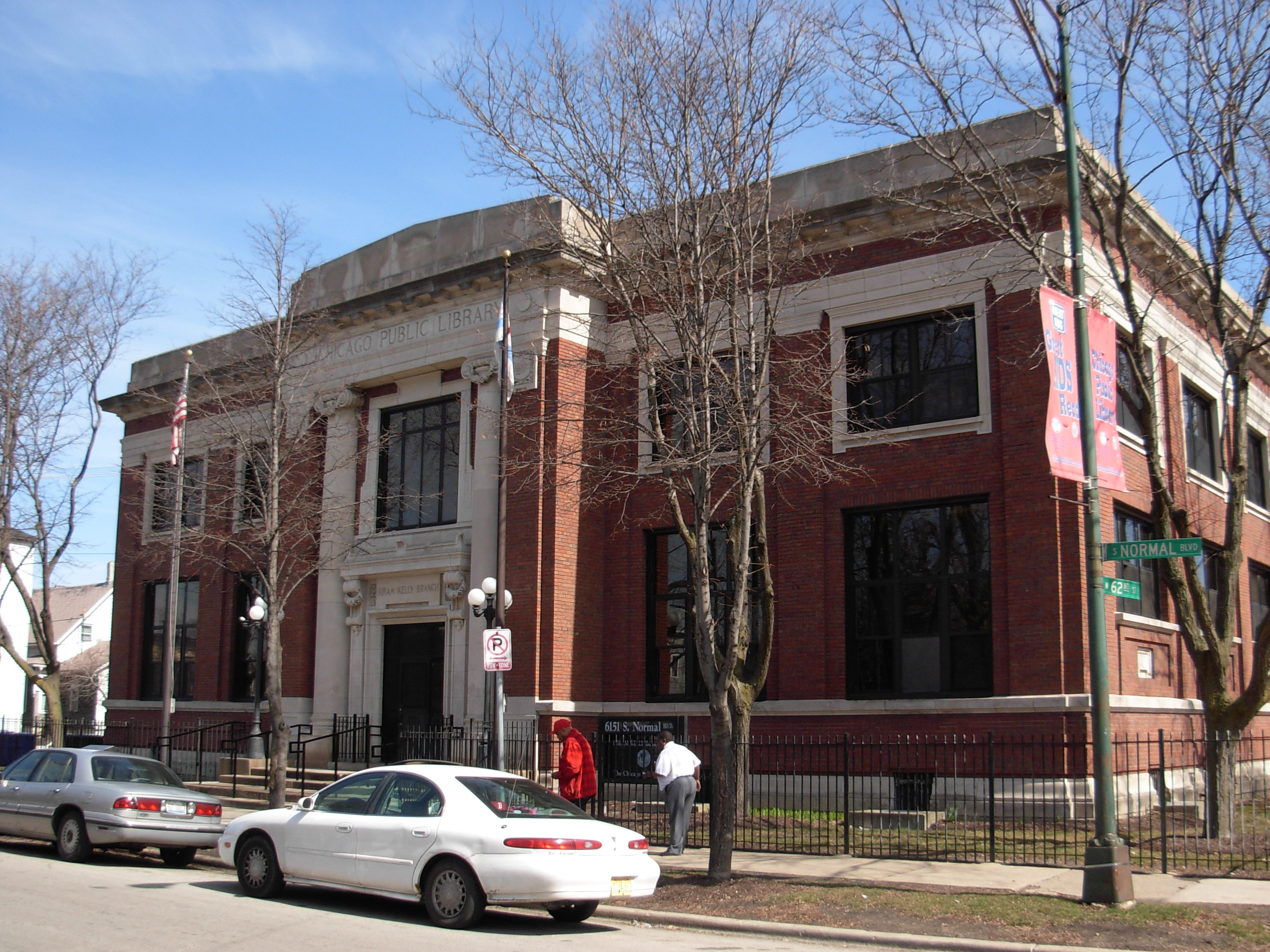
Kelly Branch

- Altgeld Branch
- Avalon Branch
- Obama Presidential Center Branch
- Beverly Branch
- Brainerd Branch
- Chicago Lawn Branch
- Clearing Branch
- Bessie Coleman Branch
- Greater Grand Crossing Branch
- Hegewisch Branch
- Jeffery Manor Branch
- Kelly Branch
- Thurgood Marshall Branch
- Mount Greenwood Branch
- Pullman Branch
- Scottsdale Branch
- South Chicago Branch
- South Shore Branch
- Vodak East Side Branch
- Walker Branch
- West Englewood Branch
- West Lawn Branch
- West Pullman Branch
- Wrightwood-Ashburn Branch
- Whitney M. Young, Jr. Branch

== See also ==
- List of museums and cultural institutions in Chicago
- Illinois Heartland Library System
- Reaching Across Illinois Library System
