= Intercollegian Wonder Books =

1920s book series

Intercollegian Wonder Books, or, The Negro in Chicago, 1779-
- Edited by: Frederic H. Hammurabi Robb
- Language: English
- Publisher: Washington Intercollegiate Club of Chicago, Chicago
- Published: 1927; 1929
- No. of books: 2

The Intercollegian Wonder Books were a series of books published by the Washington Intercollegiate Club of Chicago. Part of the New Negro movement, the Wonder Books surveyed the Black experience in Chicago at the time.
