= Vivian G. Harsh =

American librarian (1890-1960)

- Harsh, c. 1920s.
- Born: Vivian Gordon Harsh; May 27, 1890; Chicago, Illinois, U.S.
- Died: August 17, 1960 (aged 70); Chicago, Illinois, U.S.
- Education: Wendell Phillips Academy High School; Simmons College
- Occupation: Librarian
- Years active: 1909–1958
- Known for: First African American branch manager in the Chicago Public Library system; Vivian G. Harsh Research Collection of Afro-American History and Literature

Vivian Gordon Harsh (May 27, 1890 – August 17, 1960) was an American librarian. Harsh is noted as the Chicago Public Library (CPL) system's first African American branch manager, being assigned to the position on February 26, 1924. Harsh served as a librarian for 34 years until retiring in 1958. During her career, she began an extensive archive on African American history and culture, which is now known as, the Vivian G. Harsh Research Collection, at the CPL.

== Background ==
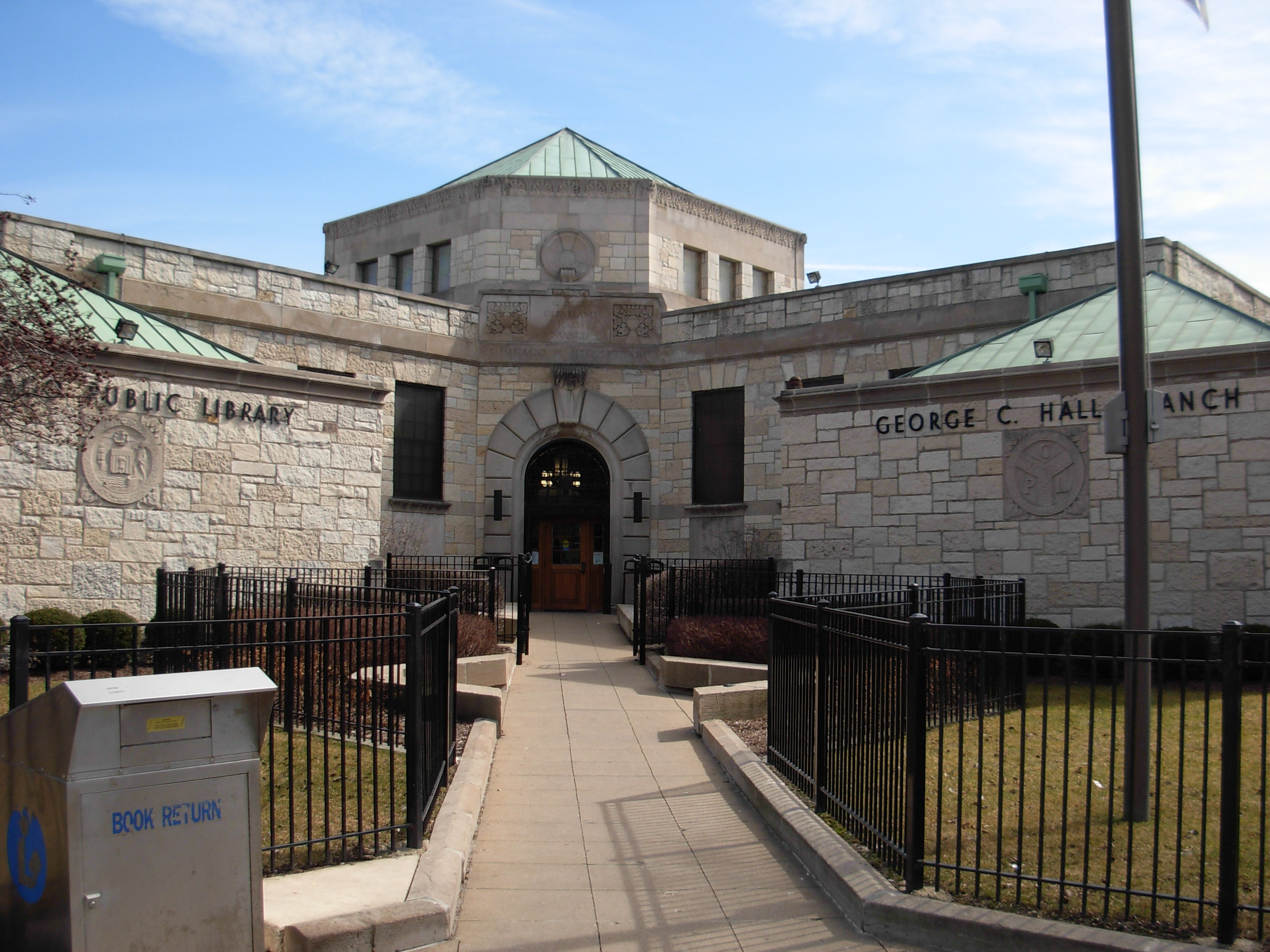
Hall Library (in 2010) where Harsh worked in the early and mid 20th century.

She was born in Chicago to a family described as “blueblood” by the Chicago Defender in its obituary for Harsh. Her mother was one of the first female graduates of the historically black Fisk University in Tennessee and her father owned a saloon. Harsh attended Wendell Phillips Academy High School located in the Bronzeville neighborhood on the city's south side (which would later produce numerous other famous alumni, from singer Sam Cooke to the first Harlem Globetrotters). Harsh first began working for the Chicago Public Library as a junior clerk in 1909 and became a children's librarian in 1913 alongside Naomi Pollard Dobson. She later went on to graduate from Simmons College Library School in Boston, Massachusetts.

Harsh was named director of the new George Cleveland Hall branch in 1932 and was the first African American library manager in the Chicago Public Library. Her goal for Hall Library when she became director was to have it serve as a community gathering space and to provide educational outreach opportunities. As a librarian, she was passionate about collecting works about African Americans and she traveled extensively throughout the South finding books to add to her collection. Harsh assembled the "Special Negro Collection" at the library, which drew a large number of diverse readers and researchers to the library.

Additionally, in her role as the director of Hall Library, Harsh organized community programs such as black history clubs, literary study clubs, a literature forum, art exhibits, storytelling sessions, drama clubs, a senior citizen’s group, and debates, all with the assistance of black children's librarian Charlemae Hill Rollins.

The literature forum Harsh created met twice a month and provided community members a place to gather and listen to book reviews or lectures given by fellow community members. Langston Hughes, Zora Neale Hurston, Gwendolyn Brooks, Arna Bontemps, Horace Clayton, and Margaret Walker were among the people who participated in these forums. The Hall Library's role as a meeting place for African-American thinkers and activists had a profound impact on the surrounding Bronzeville neighborhood in Chicago in the 1930s and 1940s. Harsh retired as director of Hall Library in 1958.

=== Personal and death ===
Harsh suffered a romantic heartbreak and never married. She died on August 17, 1960, aged 70 in Chicago.

== Legacy ==
=== Vivian G. Harsh Research Collection of Afro-American History and Literature ===
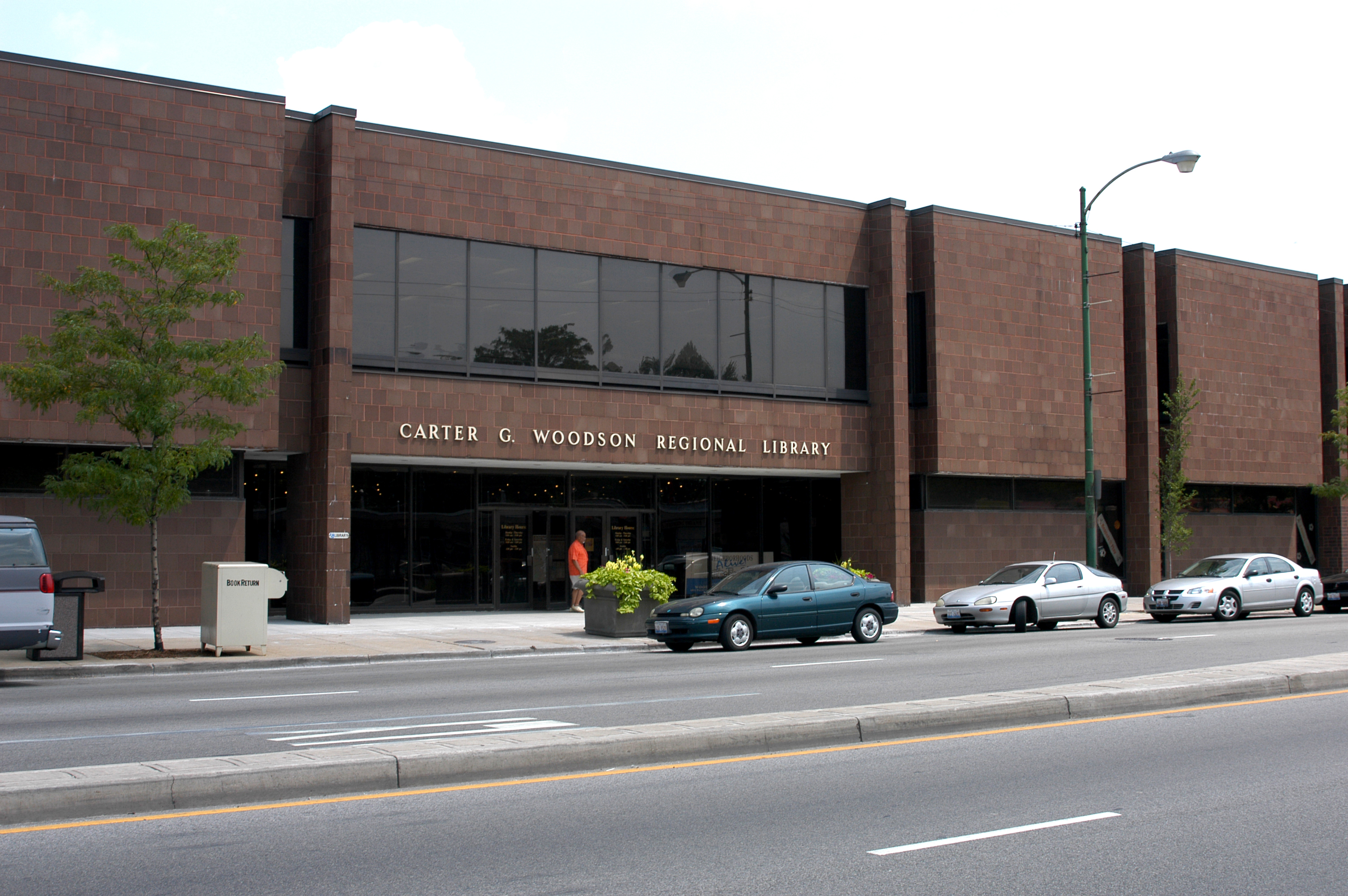
Woodson Regional Library, located on the south side of Chicago, Illinois.

The collection Harsh started has been renamed the Vivian G. Harsh Research Collection of Afro-American History and Literature and is now located at the Woodson Regional Library just east of Beverly, Chicago. Today, the Harsh collection contains rare books, current and historical periodicals, microfilm collections, and archival document collections. The holdings include: the Timuel D. Black Papers, the William McBride Jr. Papers, the Richard Wright Papers, and the Patricia Lidell Researchers Archives, among other African-American activists, authors, educators, and organizations with ties to the city of Chicago. The Harsh Collection also regularly exhibits items of particular interest. Recent exhibitions include selections from the Timuel D. Black Papers and the Reverend Addie Wyatt Papers. Today, the Vivian G. Harsh Collection is the largest African American history and literature collection in the Midwest, it was once called the "Black Jewel of the Midwest."
