= Illinois State Library =

Official State Library of Illinois

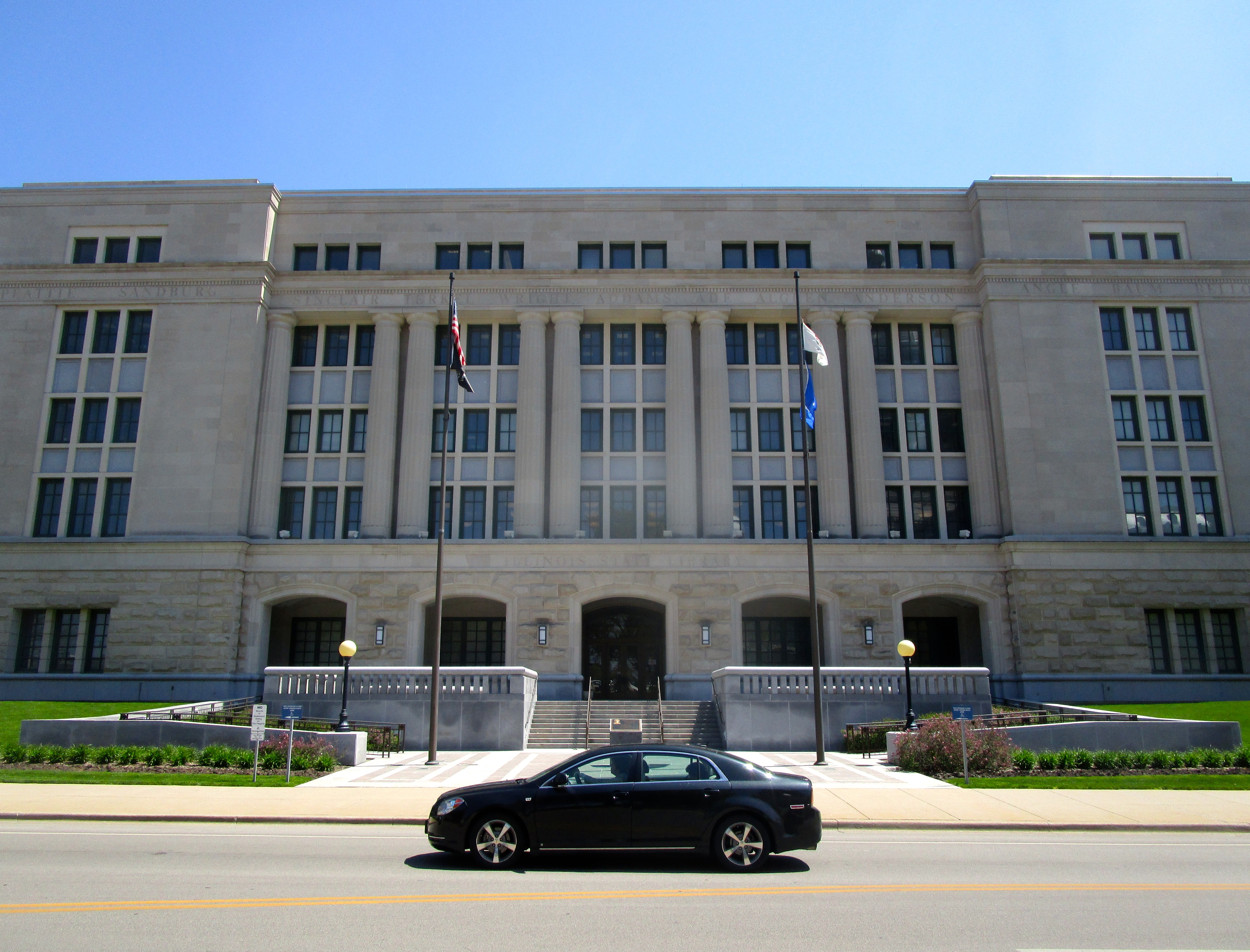

Agency overview
- Formed: February 22, 1839
- Jurisdiction: State of Illinois
- Headquarters: 300 South Second Street; Springfield, Illinois, United States; 39.7992172°N 89.6528777°W
- Agency executives: Alexi Giannoulias, State Librarian; Greg McCormick, Director
- Parent agency: Office of the Secretary of State
- Website: ilsos.gov/departments/library

The Illinois State Library (ISL) is the library of the state of Illinois, located in Springfield, Illinois, and administered by the Office of the Secretary of State of Illinois. The library has a collection of 5 million items and serves as regional federal documents depository for the state. The library oversees the Talking Book and Braille Service which offers audio and braille library service to Illinois residents with print disabilities or other disabilities. The library maintains the Illinois Center for the Book, the Illinois Digital Archives and the Illinois Veterans History Project.

== Building ==
The original state library was located next to the office of Stephen A. Douglas while he was Secretary of State of Illinois. It moved into the west wing of the State Capitol's third floor in October 1887. The Illinois State Library is currently housed in the purpose-built library rededicated as the Gwendolyn Brooks State Library in 2003. The library which was designed by Chicago architectural firm Graham, Anderson, Probst and White. Construction took five years to complete and cost just under 36 million dollars when it was complete in 1990.

== See also ==
- List of libraries in the United States
