= Tom Y. Chan =

American businessman and civic leader

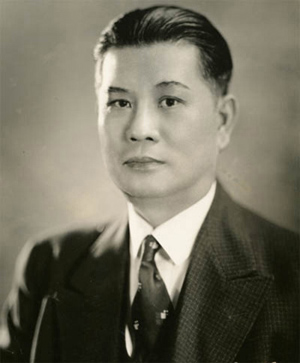
- Born: Tom Young Chan; September 25, 1881; Yakou in Zhongshan, Guangdong Province, China
- Died: September 3, 1944 (aged 62); Chicago, Illinois, United States
- Occupation: Businessman
- Spouses: Mary Goo
- Children: 8
- Relatives: Ping Tom (son), Lauren Tom (granddaughter)

Tom Young Chan (Chinese: 譚贊; Jyutping: taam4 zaan3, September 25, 1881 – September 3, 1944) was an American businessman and civic leader. Based in Chicago, Chan was a leading supporter of the Kuomintang in the United States, and helped raise money for both Sun Yat-sen and General Chiang Kai-shek. In addition, he raised money in the form of war bonds for the United States during World War II. He was the father of Ping Tom and grandfather of actress Lauren Tom.

== Biography ==
Tom Young Chan was born in the village of Yakou in Zhongshan, Guangdong Province, China. He was the second of seven children. His surname is actually "Tom", but his Anglicized name failed to recognize that Chinese give their surnames first. A journalist for the Chicago Daily News described him as a "handsome, smiling Chinese with leaping eyebrows" who spoke "halting English."

=== Political activities ===
- 1898: he immigrated to Honolulu, Hawaii, at the age of 17 and worked as a typesetter for the Lung Chi Pao, a weekly newspaper that reported for Sun Yat-sen. He became a United States citizen as a result of the annexation of Hawaii on July 6, 1898. The Lung Chi Pao reorganized into the Minsheng Daily in 1906, and later into the Hawaiian Chinese News. In 1907, he helped raise funds to establish the Tzu Yu Hsin Pao (Freedom News).
- 1908: Chan moved to the mainland, traveling first to New York City, where he learned how to make noodles, and then to Chicago. He believed that industry and commerce were essential to financing the revolutionary cause.
- 1909: he joined the Tongmenghui (Revolutionary Alliance), which Dr. Sun established during his visit to Chicago that December.
- 1911: he founded the Chinese Noodle Company, Chinese Trading Company, and Min Sun Company. During this year, he gave financial support to Dr. Sun's revolutionary movement, which experienced a setback with the Canton uprising in April. After the Wuchang Uprising on October 10, he helped raise money so that Dr. Sun could return to China from the United States through Europe.
- 1926: he represented the main party branch in San Francisco, California at the Second National Congress of the Kuomintang in Guangzhou (January 4–19). At that time, he saw his father for the first time in almost 30 years.
- 1928: he was appointed director of the main party branch by the Kuomintang Central Executive Committee. On October 21, he was elected inspection officer at the second congress of the main party branch, which adopted his proposal to establish a Chinese newspaper in Chicago.
- 1929: he revisited China as a delegate to the Third National Congress of the Kuomintang in Nanking (March 18–27).
- 1930: he became general manager of the San Min Morning Paper, which was first published on March 18. For many years, this was the only Chinese newspaper in the Midwest, with circulation in the southern U.S., central Canada, and Mexico.
- 1934: he served as vice chairman of the China Relief Association in Chicago, one of the earliest such organizations in the U.S.

During the Century of Progress World's Fair (1933–34), Chan had a noodle factory demonstration as well as a demonstration of how bean sprouts are grown.

- 1941: Chan raised $1 million for an orphanage founded by Madame Chiang, the wife of Chiang Kai-shek that cared for 30,000 children. At that time, he was the only one in Chinatown to have seen her before, and he dined with the General and his wife five times during a visit to Chongqing.
- 1942: he was appointed to China's People's Political council, the closest thing to a parliament in China's political structure, along with seven other overseas Chinese. He went to China to attend the Second People's Political Council in November and the Ninth Session of the Kuomintang National Congress. That year, he took an eight-month tour of the U.S. and Canada to give encouragement to overseas Chinese by order of the Party.
- 1943: he served on the five-man presidium of the All-America Chinese Congress of Resistance and Relief Organization in New York (September 5–11).

=== Death ===
Chan died on September 3, 1944, at the age of 62, 22 days before his 63rd birthday. Thousands turned out for a man who had helped to raise more than $4 million during the last war bond drive for his adopted country. As prominent as he was, however, he was not allowed to be buried next to his late wife, Mary Goo, in Rosehill Cemetery, Chicago, Illinois, for what some believe to be racist reasons. He is buried at Mount Auburn Cemetery, Stickney, Illinois.
