= St. Therese Chinese Catholic School =

Catholic School in Chicago

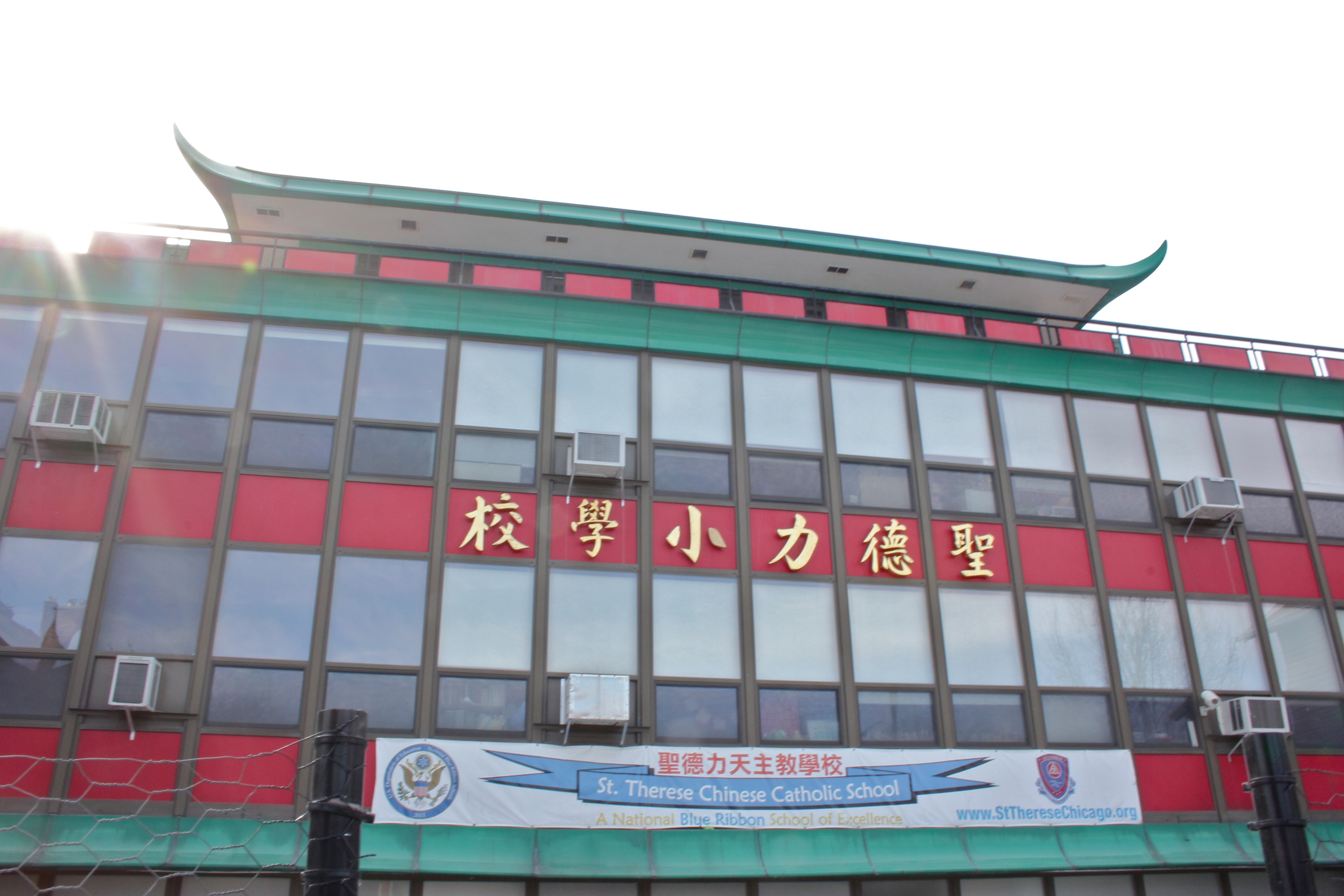

Location
- Chicago, Illinois; United States
- 41°51′2.5″N 87°38′2.0″W

Information
- Religious affiliation: Roman Catholicism
- Established: 1941
- Grades: Pre-Kindergarten - Grade 8

St. Therese Chinese Catholic School is a private, Roman Catholic PK - 8 school located in the Chinatown neighborhood of Chicago, Illinois, United States. The school was named after St. Therese, the patroness saint of missions. The school is part of the Roman Catholic Archdiocese of Chicago Catholic Schools. St. Therese was also the first Chinese Catholic school in the Midwest.

== History ==
St. Therese Chinese Catholic School was originally founded in 1941 after the founding of St. Therese Mission in 1940. It was originally opened on September 3, 1941, by Reverend John T. S. Mao at the On Leong Merchants' Association Building at 22nd Place and Wentworth. One Hundred Chinese students were anticipated to enroll for classes. The school started with two large classrooms and 4 total rooms in the building, with the aim to provide a Catholic education to the Chinatown community. Faculty in the school initially consisted of six Sisters of Notre Dame and three lay instructors, who taught all eight grades of elementary school as well as four years of high school at the time. A full curriculum was taught to all these classes, along with additional offered courses in typing, sewing, crafts, music, and shorthand. The first graduating group was composed of five students that graduated on June 14, 1942, with them going on to seek admission to Catholic high schools of the city. Following this on July 6, 1942, the school ran a school program for all grades that included a curriculum and classes for music, typing, sewing, and wood carving. Other activities such as trips, hiking in parks, and some lessons in swimming were done as well (12). Summer school that year was set to end on August 14. Father Mao explained part of his reasoning for starting a summer school program was because many parents of the students joined war industries and had limited options for childcare. Registration for the fall term of 1942 ran from the first of September to the third, with the school opening on September 8 and two more teachers from Notre Dame being added to the staff. In 1952, then pastor of St. Therese Michael J. McKiernan invited the Maryknoll Sisters to assume responsibility of the school from the Sisters of Notre Dame.

Towards the end of the 1950s, the school had more students than the space at the On Leong Merchants' Association building could afford. The classrooms had become overcrowded and almost half of the student body had to travel to St. Paul's school at 2124 22nd Place in order to attend classes. Reverend Frederick J. Backa, appointed St. Therese Church's pastor in 1956, concentrated on acquiring a singular building for the school. This was paired with the Our Lady of Angels School fire in December 1958, where St. Therese's On Leong Building classrooms were condemned as unsafe. On September 13, 1959, construction for a new school building started at 247 West 23rd Street. Acquisition for the new building was achieved through various means. A significant donation from Frank C Callahan, students selling raffle tickets door to door in wealthier neighborhoods, and the support of Chinatown merchants all contributed to the new building. Additionally fundraisers, dinners, bazaars, and performances were conducted to aid both with funding and relieving debt after the building was constructed. The new building, designed by architectural firm Kefir and Cronin, was built on 247 West 23rd Street with three floors and a ground level, with the top third floor being a convent for nuns, the ground level a chapel, and the other two floors being for the school. The exterior of the school had gold anodized aluminum Chinese characters, a glass façade with red and green porcelain, and pointed up eaves on the roof that resembled a pagoda. The golden Chinese characters read literally as 'Holy Virtue Strength Little Study Building' but as 'St. Therese Grammar School' when translated into English. It cost $380,000 to complete the building at the time. The school was officially dedicated on April 30, 1961, by Cardinal Albert G. Meyer during a parade to celebrate the event. A debt of $188,500 still remained in early 1962 to be paid off after the school was dedicated, with the school operating a bazaar in 1961 to help pay off the amount.

In 1981, the Maryknoll Sisters transferred responsibility of the school over to the Roman Catholic Archdiocese of Chicago. The school then added a preschool to their curriculum in 1988. In the early 2000s, the school had been facing a number of significant issues. It received $200,000 of subsidies from the Archdiocese but was not able to fulfil payroll or utility payments. The school also had problems with enrolling enough students to attend. After Phyllis Cavallone-Jurek became principal of the school in 2004 and the Archdiocese put an independent board in place to assist in managing the school, St. Therese saw improvements to their current state. Cavallone-Jurek applied for almost three dozen grants, which was used to expand technology access for students. St. Therese additionally had 301 students and 470 in a waiting list in 2012, compared to only 37 new students enrolling in 2004. Beginning in 2018, the Archdiocese initiated the Renew My Church initiative, which sought to merge churches and their schools together due to declining attendance and financial support. Both school and churches completed merging in 2019 under the St. Therese name, when the first full academic year with both campuses started. The school currently hosts Pre-Kindergarten to 8th grade classes at the St. Therese campus, and used to have 6th-8th grade at the St. Barbara campus.

== Campuses ==
St. Therese Chinese Catholic School has had two campuses in Chicago's Chinatown and one in Bridgeport. The first campus was founded in 1941 at the On Leong Merchant's Association Building at 2216 South Wentworth Avenue, and then moved to the 247 West 23rd Street campus on April 30, 1960. This became the permanent and main campus in Chicago's Chinatown, but later expanded to include a second campus. In 2018, the Roman Catholic Archdiocese of Chicago initiated the Renew My Church plan in order to reallocate and reorganize parishes and organizations under it in order to address declining financial support and parish attendance. This included plans to merge the St. Therese school and St. Barbara school under the St. Therese name. The schools completed merging in 2019, where the first classes took place for the 2019–2020 school year. St. Barbara now exists as the Bridgeport campus of St. Therese, where the 6th-8th grade classrooms are held. The St. Barbara campus is at 2859 South Throop Street. (The St. Barbara Campus has closed and no longer is being used as of the school year 2025–2026)

== Events ==
The school has participated in several events throughout its existence. It has participated in a school bazaar, the Chicago parade for Taiwan's 10/10 independence day parade, the Chicago Chinatown Summer Fair, Chinese New Year celebrations, and a yearly fundraiser dinner

== Leadership ==
St. Therese's current principal is Lisa Deborah Oi. Oi started working at St. Therese in 1997 and continued to work as a 2nd grade teacher in 2012. She then became assistant principal and director of the school's resource department in 2012. In 2018, she became principal of the school. Father Francis Li is also the current pastor of both St. Therese and St. Barbara, and serves as the administrator for the St. Therese school. Previously, Phyllis Cavallone-Jurek was principal from Summer 2004 to 2018

== Alumni ==
- Leonard Louie, Chinese-American civic leader who was most known for the creation of Ping Tom Memorial Park in Chicago's Chinatown
- Henry Cai, chef and owner of the restaurant Three Little Pigs Chi
