= Ping Tom =

American businessman and civic leader (1935–1995)

Ping Tom 譚繼平
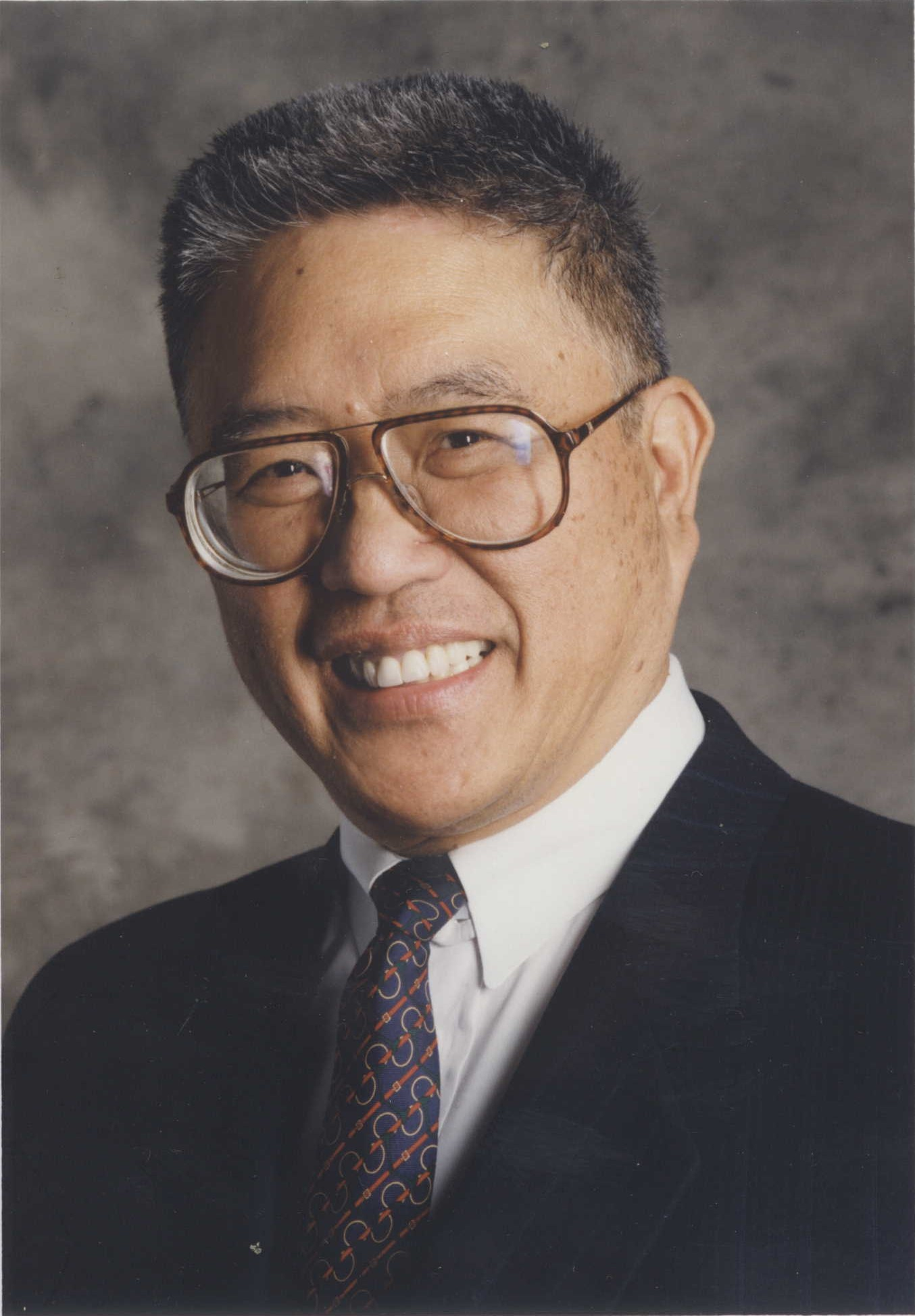
- Born: April 15, 1935; Chicago, Illinois, U.S.
- Died: July 7, 1995 (aged 60); Chicago, Illinois, U.S.
- Occupation: Businessman
- Spouse: Valerie Ching (m. 1958)
- Relatives: Lauren Tom (niece)

Ping Tom (April 15, 1935 – July 7, 1995) (Chinese: 譚繼平; Jyutping: taam4 gai3 ping4) was an American businessman and civic leader in Chicago. Ping Tom Memorial Park is dedicated to him.

== Early life and education ==
Tom was the youngest of eight children. His mother, Lillian Goo, married Tom Y. Chan after her sister, Mary Goo, Chan's first wife, died from influenza. Mary Goo had two children: Florence and Grace. Lillian had six children: Priscilla, Helene, Eunice, Mary, Tom (Chung) and Ping.

Tom attended Haines School in Chinatown. He then won a high-school scholarship to Francis W. Parker School in Chicago. Tom won the Parker scholarship over his best friend, Robert Henry Lawrence Jr., who went on to become the first African-American astronaut. Tom graduated from Parker in 1952. Both of his sons, Darryl (Class of 1988) and Curtis (Class of 1990), as well as Trace Lawrence (Class of 1977), Mr. Lawrence's son, also attended Francis W. Parker School.

In an article Tom wrote for the Parker Weekly in 1988, he stated that his experience at Parker shaped and influenced his life in two ways. First, Parker's atmosphere of encouragement helped him build self-confidence. Second, Parker's diversity taught him to develop "mutual respect and caring for those of a different race, ethnicity and religion." In fact, he noted that he had not known a Jew until he attended Parker.

Tom then attended Northwestern University where he entered a special six-year dual degree program to obtain a bachelor's degree concurrently with a Juris Doctor from Northwestern University School of Law, receiving his B.A. in Economics in 1956 and his J.D. in 1958.

== Businesses ==
Chinese Trading Co. & Chinese Noodle Co. new building opening on July 12, 1965

- Chinese Trading Company (est. 1911): food import company
  - Vice president, 1966–1972; President, 1972–1995
- Chinese Noodle Company (est. 1911): maker of egg noodles and won ton and egg roll skins
  - Vice president, 1958–1966; President, 1972–1995
- Lekel Chop Suey Pail Company: maker of take out food pails
  - President, 1980–1995
- Mah Chena Corporation: frozen food and appetizers
  - President, 1980–1995
- Griesbaum Meat Company: tripe processing company
  - President, 1980–1995

Chinese Trading Company and Chinese Noodle Company were founded by Tom Y. Chan. The other companies were acquired by the Tom family later.

After his older brother, Chung, died of a heart attack in 1980, Tom became president of all of the above companies. His sisters, Helene, Eunice, and Mary also worked for the family business, as did his nephews, Jan Wong (Eunice's son) and Chip Tom (Chung's son).

== Civic activities ==
- Trustee, WTTW-TV Channel 11
- Trustee, Adler Planetarium
- Trustee, The Lincoln Academy of Illinois
- Trustee, Jane Addams' Hull House
- Director, Madison Bank
- Member, Chicago Board of Roosevelt University
- Member, Board of Advisors, Mercy Hospital and Medical Center
- Member, Illinois Development Finance Authority
- Member, South Side Planning Board
- Member, Economic Club of Chicago
- Member, design committee for Harold Washington Library
- Member, Metropolitan Pier and Exposition Authority
- Member, U.S. Federal Judicial Nominations Committee
- Director, Asian American Institute
- Founding president (1983), Chinatown Chamber of Commerce
- Chairman, Chinatown Parking Corporation
- Past president and director, Chinese American Civic Council
- Member, Advisory Board of the Chinese American Service League

Tom was a leader not only in the Chinese community but in the broader Asian American community. His beaming smile and calm demeanor endeared him to people of all backgrounds. Friends say that he had a natural ability to resolve differences among people. He was one of the thirteen original founders of the Asian American Coalition of Chicago, an organization that annually brings together diverse Asian communities, including Chinese, Indian, Pakistani, Japanese, Korean, Indonesian, Thai, Vietnamese, and Cambodian, among others.

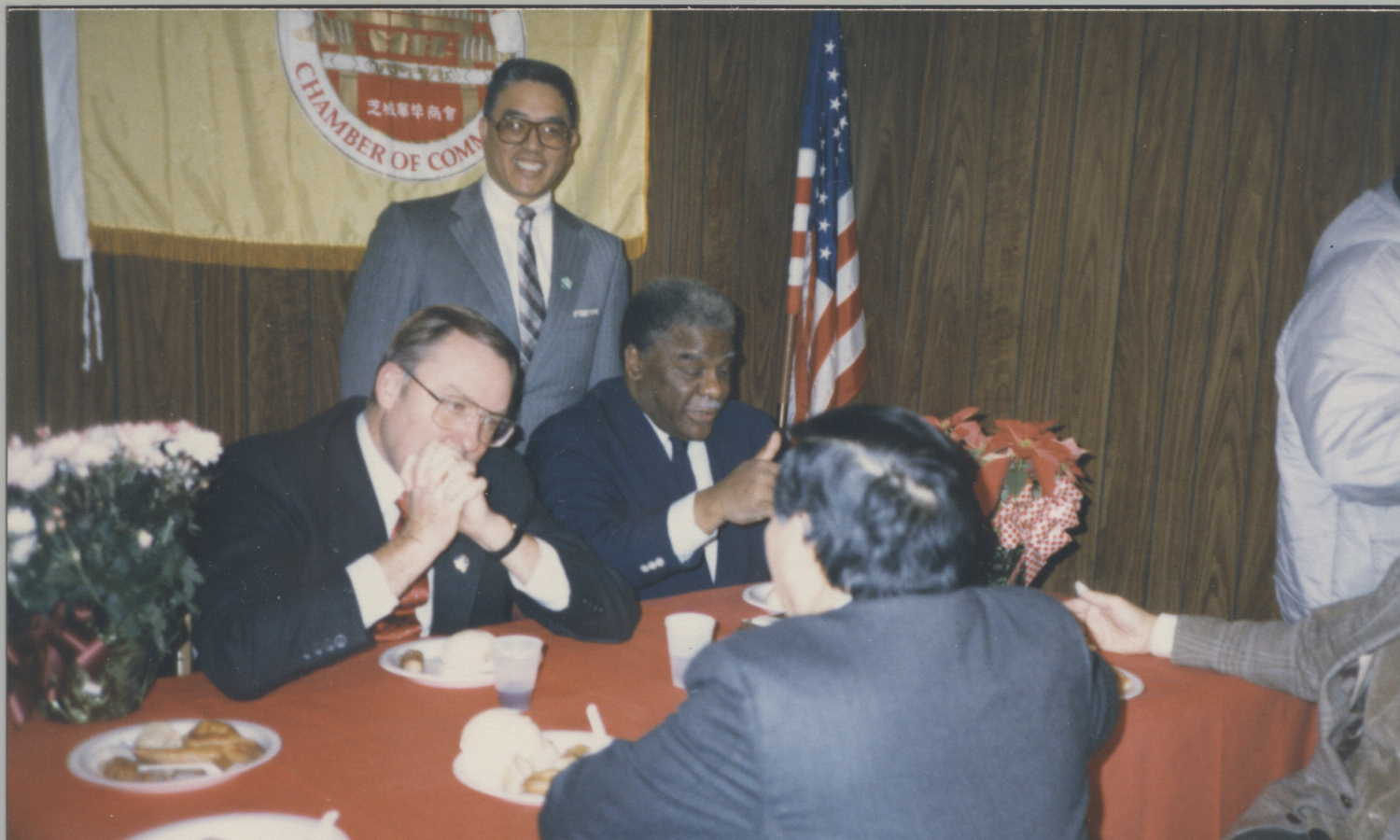
Ping Tom with Gov. Thompson and Mayor Washington

Furthermore, some say that because he was a second-generation native English speaker, he had an easier time working with mainstream (non-Asian) organizations and even politicians. Tom was an advisor to U.S. Senators (Paul Simon, Carol Moseley Braun), Illinois governors (James R. Thompson, Jim Edgar), and Chicago mayors (the late Harold Washington and Richard M. Daley).

Outside of family and the family businesses, Tom's greatest achievement was his work on Chinatown Square, a $100 million plus residential and commercial expansion of Chinatown on 32 acres (130,000 m^{2}) of land purchased from the Santa Fe Railroad. As president of the Chinese American Development Corporation, founded in 1984, he did not have the chance to see the bustling development that it has become. It was his desire to expand Chinatown so that there would be more room for his fellow Chinese to live and work. He was recently recognized as one of Chicago magazine's top 40 Chicago pioneers for his efforts.

== Personal life ==
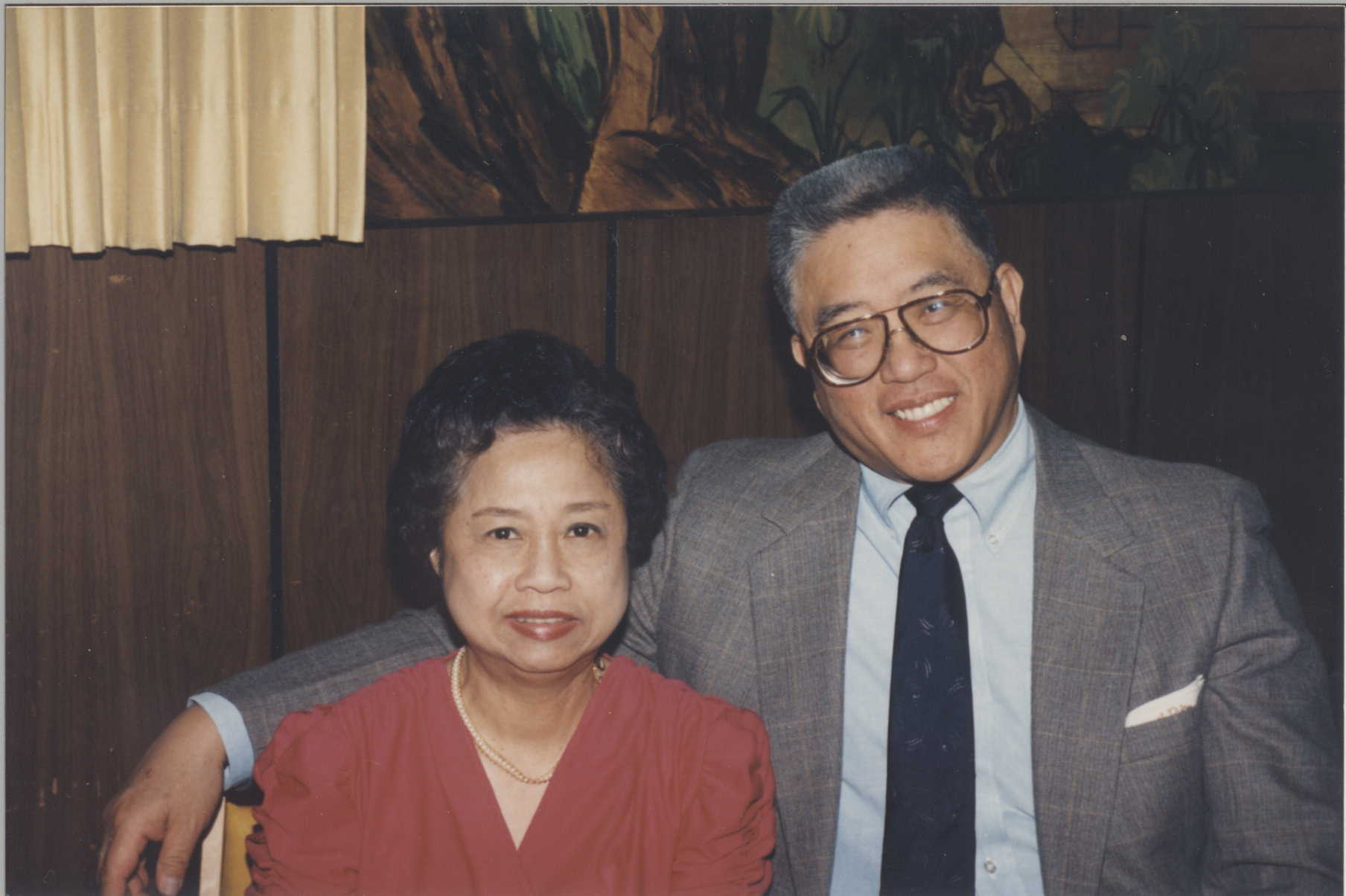
Ping and Valerie

Ping Tom married Valerie Ching (b. September 15, 1934) of Honolulu, Hawaii, on October 11, 1958. They met in Chicago while Tom was attending law school at Northwestern University and Valerie attended the Gregg Court Reporting School, which was then associated with Northwestern. They had two children: Darryl Tom (b. March 13, 1970) and Curtis Tom (b. August 13, 1972; d. April 19, 2025). Tom was the uncle of American actress Lauren Tom.

== Death and legacy ==
Bust of Ping Tom

Following his sudden death in 1995 due to pancreatic cancer, Tom's wish that a park be built for Chinatown residents came true on October 2, 1999, when the Chicago Park District dedicated the 12-acre (49,000 m^{2}) Ping Tom Memorial Park next to the Chinatown Square in his name. In 2005, a bust of Tom was installed in the park to commemorate the 10th anniversary of his death.

The Asian American Coalition of Chicago has since named its highest award, the Pan Asian American Award, in his honor.
