= Chinatown Square =

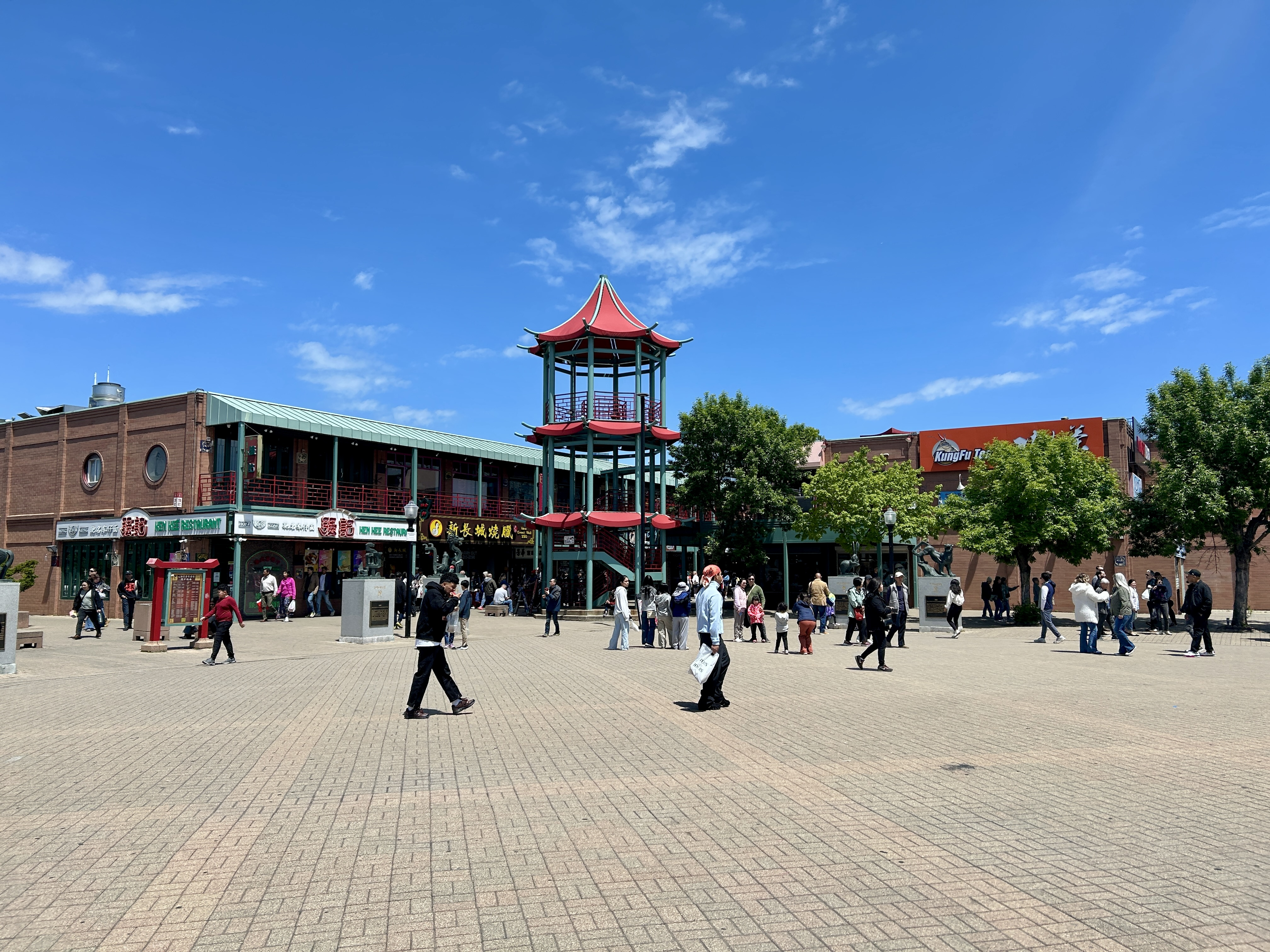
- Chinatown Square in 2025
- Location: Chinatown, Chicago, United States
- Coordinates: 41°51′14″N 87°37′59″W
- Address: 2100 S. Wentworth Ave.
- Opened: 1993
- Developer: Chinese American Development Corporation
- Architect: Harry Weese and Associates
- Floors: 2
- Public transit: Red at Cermak-Chinatown; CTA
- Website: www.chicagochinatown.org

Chinatown Square (traditional Chinese: 華埠廣場; simplified Chinese: 华埠广场; pinyin: Huàbùguǎngchǎng) is a two-story outdoor mall located in Chinatown, Chicago, a mile (1.6 km) from the center of Chicago just north of the main Wentworth Avenue District (the main Chinatown Street). Chinatown Square, on 45 acres (180,000 m^{2}) of reclaimed land from a former railroad yard, houses mostly restaurants, retail space, boutiques, banks, clinics, beauty shops, and a handful of offices. This outdoor mall is the largest Chinese mall in the US east of San Francisco and west of New York City. In the middle of the mall, there are statues of the twelve animals of the Chinese zodiac from Xiamen, China. Other landmarks in the mall include twin pagodas.

The mall opened in 1993 as a result of the efforts of Chinese activists who wanted more land from the city of Chicago. In the 1960s, Chinatown's land was reduced due to the construction of the Dan Ryan Expressway (I-90/I-94) and the Stevenson Expressway (I-55). This created a problem of overcrowding and reduced the possibility of further expansion. On the present location of Chinatown Square, there was a large railroad yard in the 1980s. The conversion of this rail yard led to the creation of Chinatown Square, allowing for much needed commercial and residential expansion. New parks were created at the same time along the Chicago River. Chinatown Square was developed by the Chinese American Development Corporation.

== Neighborhood ==
Chinatown Square is bordered by Archer Avenue (2100S) to the south, Princeton Ave (300W) to the west, Wentworth Ave (200W)to the east, China Place (2000S) to the north. Just to the north of Chinatown Square is the Ping Tom Memorial Park on the Riverfront of the Chicago River.

During various festivals, such as Chinese New Year or the Autumn Moon Festival, stage performances and other entertainments are presented near the animal statues.

== History ==
The Chinese American Development Corporation (CADC) was formed on March 30, 1984, for the sole purpose of purchasing and developing the 32-acre (130,000 m^{2}) site. Planning for the development of Chinatown Square has faced many hurdles since the idea's inception. The community faced competition for the site from a bid to move the United States Postal Service's Main Office from Congress Parkway to the site. The Chinese American Civic Council rallied community support against the USPS' plans so that the site could be used to expand Chinatown. The turning point came when then chief of staff to Senator Paul Simon (D, Illinois), Nancy Chen, lobbied the Senator who intervened on behalf of the Chinese community. The Senator's parents were Presbyterian missionaries in China and he felt a deep sense of community with the Chinese people.

When environmental contamination was discovered on the site, the development corporation paid for cleanup.

Financing for the purchase of the land was arranged by the then Mayor of Chicago, Harold Washington. A loan for $4–6 million at a below-market interest rate was made by the City of Chicago to CADC for the purchase of the land. The liaison between the City of Chicago and CADC was Valerie Jarrett, later served as one of President Obama's advisers. The City of Chicago further supported the project by using Tax Increment Financing (TIF) to finance the construction of infrastructure that served the project.

Governor Jim Edgar (R) supported the project by having the State of Illinois present a $1 million grant to the Chinese American Development Fund (CADF) as a 501(c)(3). The CADF was formed for the creation and maintenance of a Chinese American Museum that would be housed in the former commissary building.

The State also financed the building of affordable housing on the site. The construction of the residential portion started after the completion of the commercial portion in 1993. These were among the first residential buildings built on the site. The residential development was faced with a deep recession and a slow absorption rate, the project floundered after building the first 24 residential units north of China Place. A partnership was formed with Richland Realty to develop the remaining residential portion. Subsequent sale of land resulted in the building of a senior's housing project by the Chinese American Service League, plus the Chinese American Service League's own main office on Tan Court. Another portion on Cermak and Princeton was sold to Walgreens.

The last expansion of the mall was in the summer of 2007; this phase eliminated the bankrupt Oriental Foods, a huge supermarket that acted as an anchor store on the East Side. Specialty shops and a bank were added in July.

The Chicago Park District unveiled plans for a large park running along the Chicago River near Chinatown Square in 1991. The first phase was the "passive" park which is now the Ping Tom Memorial Park. The park still has eleven acres of undeveloped land, and plans are in the works for further improvements.

== Architecture ==
Chinatown Square was designed by Harry Weese and Associates and gives a nod to the traditional design of the Chinese Imperial Court. The square is filled with numerous works of art commissioned by the CADC for the project. In seeking a balance between design and functionality, the square has a sewer easement that does not permit any permanent structures diagonally all the way to the Chicago River.

The design of a smaller courtyard created the ambiance of a traditional village center with a pagoda that houses an elevator shaft. Janet Shen, the landscape architect for the project, included numerous Ginkgo trees to further accentuate the Chinese flavor of the courtyard. These trees have since been removed.

== Art ==
Statues representing the twelve Chinese zodiac animals grace three sides of the square. These work of art were commissioned to the Xiamen University Art Department in Xiamen, Fujian, People's Republic of China. Each of the statues were sponsored by private donors who contributed towards the Chinese Museum's endowment fund.

A large tile mosaic mural faces Archer Avenue on the north side of the Square. This mural was commissioned by CADC and completed by artists Yan Dong, Professor of Art at Xin Hua University, and Zhou Ping, from the Movie and Television School in Beijing. Zhou Ping's sister Zhou Ling is a resident of Chicago. The mural represents the history and accomplishments of Chinese in America. The four pillars represent the technology, art, and literature of China, and Chinese contributions to the west.
