= Lauren Tom =

American actress (born 1961)

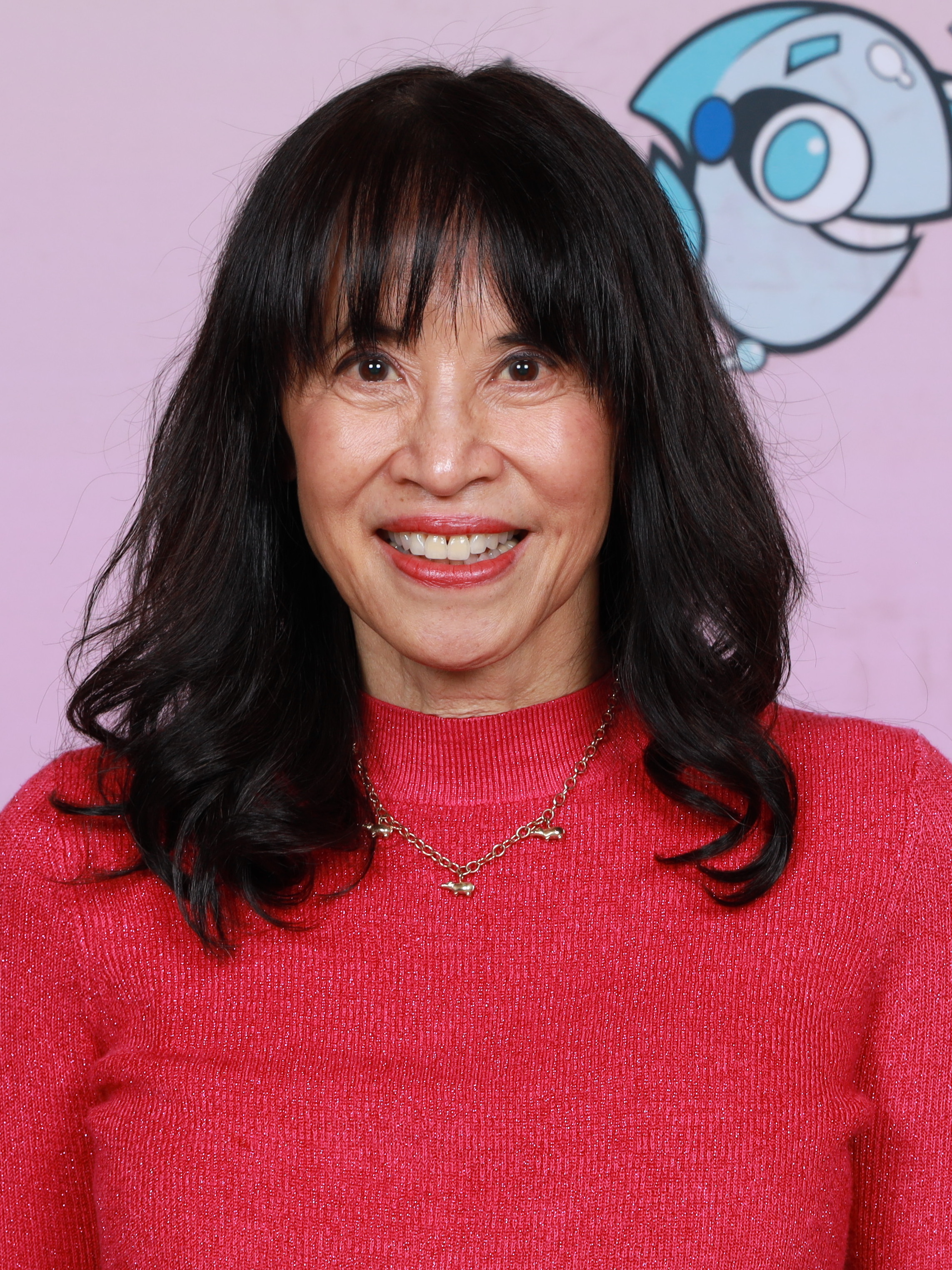
- Lauren Tom at Animate! Raleigh in 2025
- Born: August 4, 1961 (age 65); Highland Park, Illinois, U.S.
- Occupation: Actress
- Years active: 1978–present
- Spouse(s): Glenn Lau-Kee (divorced) Curt Kaplan (m. 1999)
- Children: 2
- Relatives: Tom Y. Chan (grandfather); Ping Tom (uncle)
- Website: laurentom.com

Lauren Tom (born August 4, 1961) is an American actress. She began her career on stage, winning an Obie Award, and gained recognition for her role in The Joy Luck Club (1993). On television, she is known for her roles in the NBC sitcom Friends (1995–96), the ABC shows Grace Under Fire (1997–98) and Men in Trees (2006–08), The CW series Supernatural (2012–14), and the Disney Channel series Andi Mack (2017–19).

In animation, Tom has voiced Amy Wong in Futurama, Dana Tan on Batman Beyond, Jinx and Gizmo in Teen Titans and Teen Titans Go!, Minh and Connie Souphanousinphone on King of the Hill, Numbuh 3 in Codename: Kids Next Door, and Mrs. Maybank and Dr. Jamanpour on Hamster and Gretel.

== Early life ==
Tom was born in the Chicago suburb Highland Park, Illinois, on August 4, 1961, the daughter of Nancy (née Dare) and Chan Tom Jr. She has a brother, Chip. Her parents were born in Chicago, and their grandparents came from Kaiping, Guangdong, China. She was raised in a largely Jewish neighborhood.

== Career ==
=== Theatre ===
At age 17, Tom landed a spot with a touring company of A Chorus Line and was cast in the Broadway production of the show less than a year later in the role of Connie. She won an Obie Award for her Off-Broadway acting and was cast in the Broadway shows Hurlyburly and Doonesbury. In Chicago, she starred in the Goodman Theater's production of 'Tis Pity She's a Whore.

=== Film ===
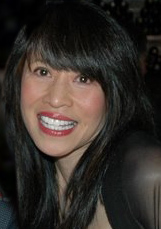
Lauren Tom in 2009

Tom has played several supporting roles in films including Wall Street, See No Evil, Hear No Evil, and Blue Steel. Her role as a waitress in the Robin Williams/Tim Robbins film Cadillac Man led to her being a guest on The Tonight Show Starring Johnny Carson.

Tom's lead roles in films include a key role in the 1984 film Nothing Lasts Forever, and a lead in the 1993 The Joy Luck Club. After this, she continued to receive supporting roles in other films such as When a Man Loves a Woman and North.

Since the mid-1990s, Tom has focused primarily on voice roles. She has appeared in a few live-action films, including the 2003 comedy Bad Santa and the 2004 film In Good Company.

=== Television ===
Tom's first role in television was that of Miko Wakamatsu on The Facts of Life. She subsequently appeared on The Equalizer, Vengeance Unlimited, thirtysomething, Quantum Leap, Chicago Hope, Homicide: Life on the Street, Grace Under Fire, Friends, The Nanny, The Middle, DAG, The Division, Monk, My Wife and Kids, Barbershop: The Series, Grey's Anatomy, The Closer, and Men in Trees.

From 2017 to 2019, she had a starring role on the Disney Channel comedy-drama Andi Mack, playing Andi's grandmother Celia and had a supporting role on the 8th and 9th season of the drama series Supernatural as prophet Kevin Tran's mother, Linda Tran. In 2018, she appeared in the second season of the Amazon Prime drama series Goliath.

=== Voice acting ===
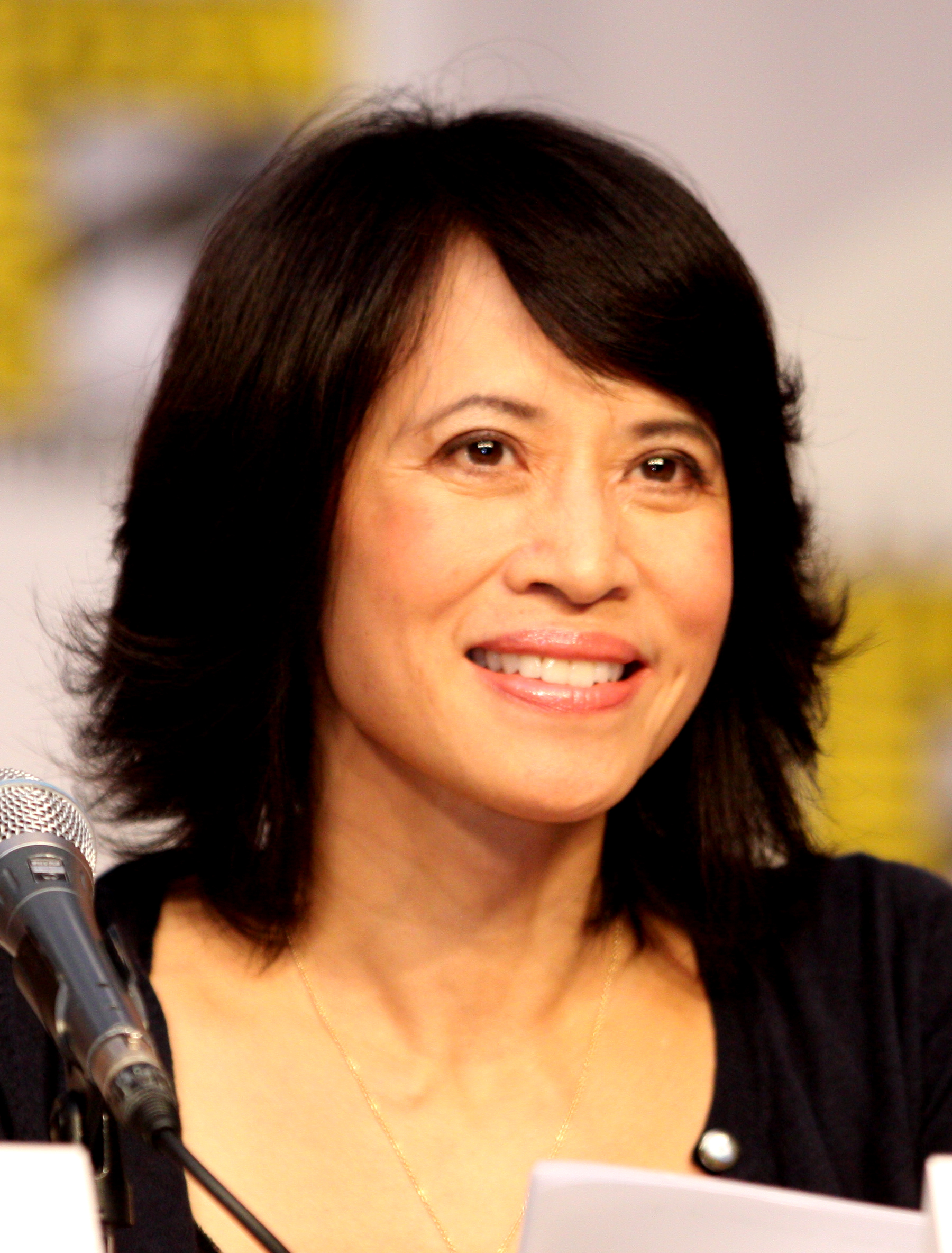
Lauren Tom in 2010 at San Diego Comic-Con

Tom began vocal work in the animated series Superman: The Animated Series playing Angela Chen. She went on to voice Dana Tan in Batman Beyond and had minor roles on Pinky and the Brain, Extreme Ghostbusters, and The Zeta Project before landing her regular roles on King of the Hill, where she voiced Minh and Connie Souphanousinphone and later Futurama, where she voices Amy and Inez Wong.

Since first playing the character on stage in the 1983 Doonesbury musical, Tom has periodically voiced the character Honey Huan in media related to Doonesbury, most notably in a series of animated shorts satirizing the 2000 U.S. presidential election.

Tom has also lent her voice to All Grown Up!, Rocket Power, Max Steel, Handy Manny as Mrs. Lee and Nelson, Samurai Jack, Johnny Bravo, Justice League Unlimited, Kim Possible, and Legion of Super Heroes.

Tom has also voiced the villains Gizmo and Jinx on Teen Titans, Yan Lin, Susan, Alchemy on W.I.T.C.H., Shun on Clifford's Puppy Days, Tasumi on The Replacements, Jake's mom, Counselor Chang on American Dragon: Jake Long, and as Joo Dee on Avatar: The Last Airbender. She also guest-starred in The Penguins of Madagascar as Chuck Charles's co-anchor, Bonnie Chang, in "Gator Watch" and "All Tied Up With a Boa".

In 2010, Tom provided the voice of Song, Bai Li, and Ming on the animated series Kung Fu Panda: Legends of Awesomeness and played the role of Jessica in the animated film Scooby-Doo! Camp Scare.

Other animated films Tom has done voice work in include Mulan II, Kim Possible: The Secret Files, Kim Possible Movie: So The Drama, Kung Fu Panda 2, Batman Beyond: Return of the Joker, and the four Futurama television films: Bender's Big Score, The Beast with a Billion Backs, Bender's Game, and Into the Wild Green Yonder.

She voiced Li Li Stormstout in World of Warcraft: Mists of Pandaria and played Hayaku on an episode of Turbo FAST.

== Personal life ==
Tom was previously married to Glenn Lau-Kee. She has since married actor Curt Kaplan in October 1999, with whom she has two children, a daughter and a son. In 2026, her daughter Ellie was diagnosed with osteosarcoma.

== Filmography ==
=== Film ===
Year	Title	Role	Notes
1984	Nothing Lasts Forever	Eloy	
1987	Magic Sticks	Redhead	
1987	Wall Street	Lady Broker	
1989	Rooftops	Audry	
1989	See No Evil, Hear No Evil	Mitzie	
1990	Blue Steel	Marjolene Ping the Female Reporter	
1990	Cadillac Man	Helen	
1992	Man Trouble	Adele Bliss	
1993	The Joy Luck Club	Lena St. Clair	
1993	Mr. Jones	Amanda Chang	
1994	When a Man Loves a Woman	Amy	
1994	North	Mrs. Ho	
1998	With Friends Like These...	Yolanda Chin	
1998	Susan's Plan	Carol	
1998	SubZero	Mariko	Voice, direct-to-video
1999	Catfish in Black Bean Sauce	Mai	
2000	Batman Beyond: Return of the Joker	Dana Tan	Voice, direct-to-video
2001	Jack the Dog	Angel	
2003	Manhood	Bambi	
2003	Bad Santa	Lois	
2004	Teacher's Pet	Younghee	Voice
2004	In Good Company	Obstetrician	
2005	Mulan II	Su	Voice, direct-to-video
2006	God's Waiting List	Sylvia	
2007	Futurama: Bender's Big Score	Amy Wong	Voice, direct-to-video
2008	Futurama: The Beast with a Billion Backs	Amy Wong, Inez Wong	Voice, direct-to-video
2008	Futurama: Bender's Game	Amy Wong	Voice, direct-to-video
2009	Futurama: Into the Wild Green Yonder	Amy Wong, Inez Wong, Trixie	Voice, direct-to-video
2010	Scooby-Doo! Camp Scare	Jessica	Voice, direct-to-video
2011	Kung Fu Panda 2	Market Sheep	Voice
2015	Chasing Eagle Rock	Roxanne	
2015	Justice League: Gods and Monsters	Lara	Voice, direct-to-video
2017	Scooby-Doo! Shaggy's Showdown	Sharon	Voice, direct-to-video
2021	Trollhunters: Rise of the Titans	Nomura	Voice, direct-to-video
2023	One True Loves	Ann	

=== Television ===
Year	Title	Role	Notes
1982	The Facts of Life	Miko	2 episodes
1984	ABC Afterschool Special	Sarah	Episode: "Mom's on Strike"
1985	CBS Schoolbreak Special	Kim	Episode: "The Exchange Student"
1985	The Equalizer	Mrs. Tom	Episode: "China Rain"
1985	The Cosby Show	Mrs. Gwynne	Episode: "Denise's Friend"
1990	Angel of Death	Julie	Television film
1990	thirtysomething	Gail	Episode: "The Distance"
1991	Lenny	Nurse	Episode: "G.I. Joe"
1991	Quantum Leap	Sophie	Episode: "Southern Comforts"
1994	704 Hauser	Margaret	Episode: "Triskaidekaphobia"
1994	Homicide: Life on the Street	Emma Zoole	2 episodes
1994	Chicago Hope	Nurse Julia	2 episodes
1995	The Puzzle Place	Julie's Mom	Episode: "Family Fun"
1995	Kidnapped: In the Line of Duty	Lily Yee	Television film
1995	Escape to Witch Mountain	Claudia Ford	Television film
1995	The Nanny	Kim	Episode: "The Chatterbox"
1995	If Not for You	Claire	Episode: "Pilot"
1995–1996	Friends	Julie	7 episodes
1996–1999	Superman: The Animated Series	Angela Chen	Voice, 14 episodes
1997	The Blues Brothers Animated Series	Soon-He, Mrs. Fun	Voice, 3 episodes
1997	Tell Me No Secrets	Connie Ching	Television film
1997	Murder Live!	Marge Fong	Television film
1997	Tracey Takes On...	Weng	Episode: "Race Relations"
1997	Pinky and the Brain	Shopper	Voice, episode: "Brain Acres"
1997	The New Batman Adventures	Ice Maiden #3	Voice, episode: "Cold Comfort"
1997–1998	Grace Under Fire	Dot	12 episodes
1997–2010, 2025–present	King of the Hill	Connie, Minh, Cindy, various	Voice, recurring role
1998	Adventures from the Book of Virtues	Mother	Voice, episode: "Charity"
1998	Dexter's Laboratory	Teacher	Voice, episode: "Last But Not Beast"
1998	Vengeance Unlimited	Samantha	Episode: "Dishonorable Discharge"
1999	Early Edition	Amy Hunter	Episode: "Play It Again, Sammo"
1999	Y2K	Ann Lee	Television film
1999–2001	The Kids from Room 402	Jordan	Voice
1999–2001	Batman Beyond	Dana Tan, Kai-Ro, Agent Lee	Voice, 22 episodes
1999–2004	Rocket Power	Trish, Sherry, various	Voice, 21 episodes
1999–present	Futurama	Amy Wong, Inez Wong, various	Voice, main role
2000	Teacher's Pet	Younghee, additional voices	Voice
2000	The Weekenders	Candace	Voice, episode: "Real Fake"
2000	Pepper Ann	Alice Kane	Voice, 2 episodes
2000–2001	DAG	Ginger Chin	17 episodes
2001	Max Steel	Laura Chen	Voice, episode: "Strangers"
2001	Johnny Bravo	Ting	Voice, episode: "Enter the Chipmunk"
2001	No P in the O.O.L.	Numbuh 3	Voice, television film
2001–2002	The Zeta Project	Agent Lee	Voice, 8 episodes
2001–2002	Lloyd in Space	Trixie, Sirenia	Voice, 3 episodes
2002	ChalkZone	Flunke, Robin	Voice, 1 episode
2002	The Division	Nora Chen	6 episodes
2002	What's New, Scooby-Doo?	Various	Voice, 4 episodes
2002–2005	Kim Possible	Yoshiko	Voice, 4 episodes
2002–2003	Totally Spies!	Carla "Lady Dragon" Wong, Keiko, Sunny Day	Voice, 3 episodes
2002–2004	Fillmore!	Karen Tehama, various	Voice, 16 episodes
2002–2004	My Wife and Kids	Hostess/ Annie Hoo	4 episodes
2002–2008	Codename: Kids Next Door	Kuki Sanban / Numbuh 3, additional voices	Voice, main role (78 episodes)
2003	All Grown Up!	Bean	Voice, episode: "Interview with a Campfire"
2003	Monk	Mrs. Ling	Episode: "Mr. Monk and the 12th Man"
2003	Duck Dodgers	Dr. Yoshimi	Voice, episode: "The Spy Who Didn't Love Me"
2003	Samurai Jack	Samurai Jack's mother, Kuni, Yamako	Voice, 3 episodes
2003	Line of Fire	Korean Jury Member	Episode: "This Land Is Your Land"
2003	Justice League	Chung	Voice, episode: "Eclipsed"
2003–2005	Teen Titans	Gizmo, Jinx	6 episodes
2003–2006	Clifford's Puppy Days	Shun, Lucy	Voice
2004	The Infinite Darcy	Darcy Chang	Voice
2004	30 Days Until I'm Famous	Carla	Television film
2004	W.I.T.C.H.	Yan Lin	Voice, 51 episodes
2005	Kim Possible: So the Drama	Yoshiko	Voice, television film
2005	Danger Rangers	Various	Voice, episode: "Fires and Liars"
2005	Barbershop	Dana	4 episodes
2005	Threshold	Janet Tam	Episode: "The Order"
2005–2006	Avatar: The Last Airbender	Joo Dee, additional voices	Voice, 3 episodes
2005–2006	Justice League Unlimited	Dr. Light, Dana Tan	Voice, 3 episodes
2005–2007	American Dragon: Jake Long	Susan Long, Counselor Chang	Voice, 25 episodes
2006	Courting Alex	Jan	Episode: "Everything I Know About Men"
2006	Let Go	Beverly	Television film
2006	Grey's Anatomy	Audrey	Episode: "Begin the Begin"
2006	In from the Night	Dr. Myra Chen	Television film
2006	Codename: Kids Next Door - Operation: Z.E.R.O.	Kuki Sanban / Numbuh 3	Voice, television film
2006	The Closer	Dr. Tann	Episode: "Borderline"
2006–2008	Men in Trees	Mai Washington	26 episodes
2006–2009	The Replacements	Tasumi	Voice, 43 episodes
2007	Billy & Mandy's Big Boogey Adventure	Kuki Sanban / Numbuh 3	Voice, television film
2007	The Grim Adventures of the KND	Numbuh 3	Voice, television film
2007–2008	Legion of Super Heroes	Zyx, White Witch	Voice, 2 episodes
2008	CSI: Crime Scene Investigation	Bae Chin	Episode: "Say Uncle"
2009	Without a Trace	Kim Tan	Episode: "Devotion"
2009	Hawthorne	Mrs. Tanaka	Episode: "The Sense of Belonging"
2010–2011	The Penguins of Madagascar	Bonnie Chang	Voice, 2 episodes
2010	Phineas and Ferb	Additional voices	Episode: "Phineas and Ferb: Summer Belongs to You!"
2010	Fish Hooks	Barb	Voice, episode: "Bea Becomes an Adult Fish"
2010–2013	Pound Puppies	Agent Ping, Dinky	Voice
2011	Curious George	Mei	Voice
2011	Kung Fu Panda: Legends of Awesomeness	Song, Ming, Bai Li	Voice
2012	Napoleon Dynamite	Tokiko	Voice, episode: "Scantronica Love"
2012–2014	Supernatural	Mrs. Linda Tran	3 episodes (Season 8 and 9)
2013	The Newsroom	Kathy Ling	2 episodes
2013–present	Teen Titans Go!	Gizmo, Jinx	Voice, recurring role
2013–2014	It's a Small World: The Animated Series	Marmura, Ling	Voice
2014–2016	Turbo Fast	Hayaku, Translator	Voice, 2 episodes
2014	The Simpsons	Amy Wong	Voice, episode: "Simpsorama"
2015	Penn Zero: Part-Time Hero	Sashi's Mom	Voice, episode: "Flurgle Burgle"
2015	Pretty Little Liars	Rebecca Marcus	3 episodes
2015	DC Super Hero Girls	Double Dare, Professor Minerva	Voice, 6 episodes
2016	Future-Worm!	Various Characters	3 episodes
2016	Transformers: Rescue Bots	Meili Szeto, Citizen #2	Voice, episode: "Upgrades"
2016–2018	Trollhunters: Tales of Arcadia	Mary Wang, Nomura	Voice, 17 episodes
2017–2019	Andi Mack	Celia Mack	Main role
2018	Mighty Magiswords	Toni Sento	Voice, episode: "Let's Team Up Because We Aren't Bad Friends"
2018	Big City Greens	Various	Voice
2018–2022	Disenchantment	Stacy LeBlatt, Miri the Mop Girl, Trixy, Mermaid Queen, additional voices	Voice, 11 episodes
2018–2019	The Loud House	Cici, Ms. Pham, Burping Burger Mom	Voice, 2 episodes
2018–2019	3Below: Tales of Arcadia	Mary Wang	Voice, 9 episodes
2018–2019	Goliath	Applebees	5 episodes
2019	Pinky Malinky	Bus Driver, Tina	Episode: "Gym"
2019	The Rookie	Mrs. Chen	Episode: "Tough Love"
2019–2021	Young Justice	Traci Thirteen, Celia Windward, Penny Randall, Jane Nassour	Voice, 8 episodes
2020	Last Man Standing	Fiona	Episode: "Keep the Change"
2020–2022	Star Trek: Lower Decks	U.S.S. Vancouver Captain; Areore Female	Voice, 2 episodes
2021	Rick and Morty	Various	Voice, 2 episodes
2021–2023	DreamWorks Dragons: The Nine Realms	May Wong	Voice
2023	My Adventures with Superman	Leader Lois	Voice, episode: "Kiss Kiss Fall In Portal"
2023	Hailey's On It!	Steal Teal, Aurora Fedora, Felicia, additional voices	5 episodes
2023	What If...?	Jiayi	Voice, "What If... Hela Found the Ten Rings?"
2024	Interior Chinatown	Betty	
2025	Poker Face	Ann St. Marie	Episode: "A New Lease on Death"
2025	The Copenhagen Test	Helen Hale	5 episodes
2025–present	Iron Man and His Awesome Friends	Helen Cho	Recurring role
2026	The Terrors of Jordan Mendoza	Sandra	Episode: "Sometimes I Feel Haunted."

=== Video games ===
Year	Title	Role	Notes
2000	King of the Hill	Connie Souphanousinphone, Minh Souphanousinphone	
2001	Rocket Power: Extreme Arcade Games	Sherry	
2002	Superman: Shadow of Apokolips	Angela Chen, Mercy Graves	
2005	Codename: Kids Next Door – Operation: V.I.D.E.O.G.A.M.E.	Kuki Sanban (Numbuh 3)	
2005	Teen Titans	Jinx, Gizmo	
2009	FusionFall	Numbuh 3	
2012	World of Warcraft: Mists of Pandaria	Li Li Stormstout	
2015	Heroes of the Storm	Li Li	
2016	World of Warcraft: Legion	Li Li Stormstout	
2017	Futurama: Worlds of Tomorrow	Amy Wong, Inez Wong, Jrrr	Mobile game; uncredited
2018	Lego DC Super-Villains	Gizmo, Jinx, Doctor Poison	
2020	Ghost of Tsushima	Lady Masako Adachi	Voice and motion capture

== Stage ==
Year	Title	Role	Notes
1975	A Chorus Line	Connie	Tour; Shubert Theatre, Broadway
1983	Doonesbury	Ching 'Honey' Huan; Dance captain	Original cast; Biltmore Theater, Broadway
1984	Hurlyburly	Donna	Ethel Barrymore Theater, Broadway
1988	American Notes	Pauline	The Public Theater, Off-Broadway; Received an Obie Award
1990	'Tis Pity She's a Whore	Annabella	Goodman Theater, Chicago
