= Ping Tom Memorial Park =

Public park in Chicago, Illinois

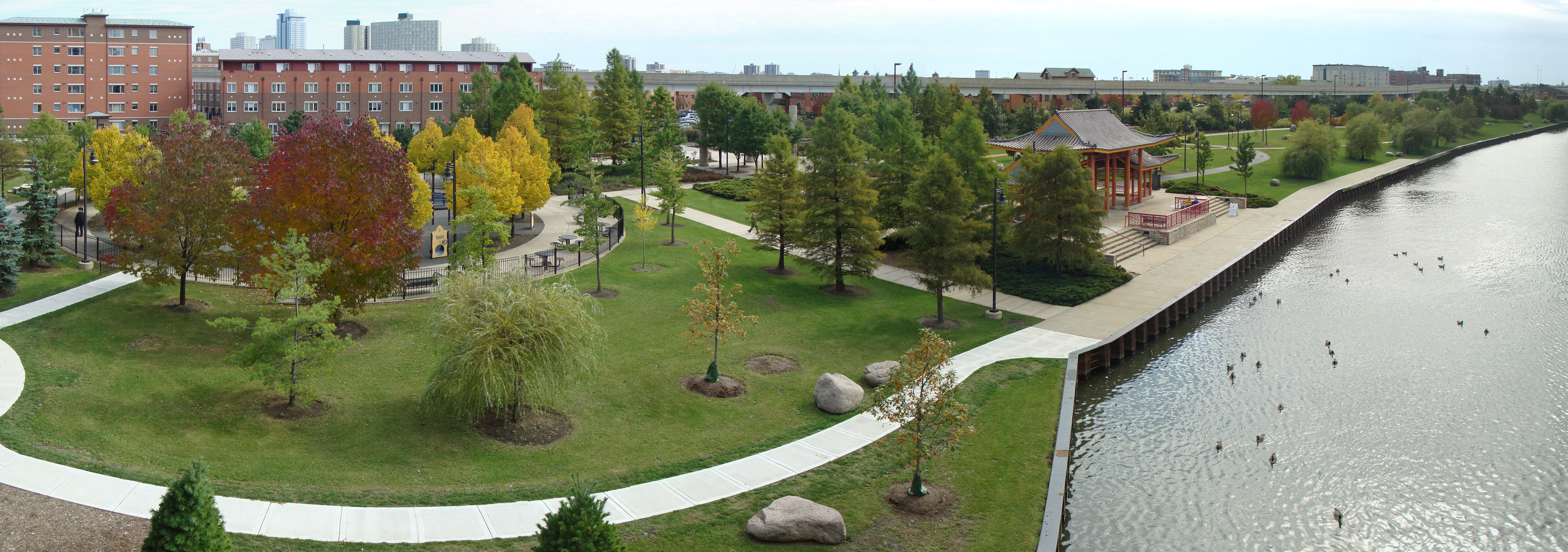
- Ping Tom Memorial Park's southern half
- Interactive map of Ping Tom Memorial Park
- Type: Public park
- Location: Chinatown, Chicago
- Coordinates: 41°51′25″N 87°38′5″W
- Area: 6.37 acres (25,800 m^{2}) developed 10.87 acres (44,000 m^{2}) undeveloped
- Created: October 2, 1999
- Operator: Chicago Park District
- Status: Open all year

Ping Tom Memorial Park
- Traditional Chinese: 譚繼平紀念公園
- Simplified Chinese: 谭继平纪念公园
Transcriptions
Standard Mandarin
- Hanyu Pinyin: Tán Jìpíng Jìniàn Gōngyuán
Yue: Cantonese
- Jyutping: Taam^{4} Gai^{3}ping^{4} Gei^{2}nim^{6} Gung^{1}jyun^{4}

Ping Tom Memorial Park (Chinese: 譚繼平紀念公園) is a 17.24-acre (6.98 ha) public urban park in Chicago's Chinatown, owned and operated by the Chicago Park District (CPD). Located on the south bank of the Chicago River, the park is divided into three sections by a Santa Fe rail track and 18th Street. Currently, only development in the area south of 18th Street has been completed. It was designed by Ernest C. Wong of Site Design Group and features a pagoda-style pavilion, bamboo gardens, and a playground. The park is named in honor of prominent Chinatown businessman and civic leader Ping Tom; a bronze bust of Tom is installed near the park's pavilion.

In 1962, the construction preparations for the Dan Ryan Expressway demolished the only two parks in the Chinatown area (Hardin Square and Stanford Park). Sun Yat-sen Playlot Park, a small, 1/3 acre (1,300 m^{2}) park, was created in the mid-1970s, however, the community wanted a larger open park space. A private real estate firm formed by Ping Tom, then purchased a former 32-acre (13 ha) rail yard in 1989. After construction of Chinatown Square began on this property, the CPD purchased approximately 6 acres (24,000 m^{2}) of unused land along the Chicago River in 1991, along with an additional 6 acres (24,000 m^{2}) that extended along the river, north of 18th Street. The southern-half of the area then underwent significant development, as the retaining wall along the river was repaired and an at-grade rail crossing was installed at the park's western boundary. Construction then began in 1998 and concluded in fall 1999 at a total cost of $5 million. The park was officially opened on October 2, 1999.

In 2002, the Chicago Park District acquired 5 acres (20,000 m^{2}) additional immediately east of the park's undeveloped northern half. The second development-stage of the park's nearly 11 acres (45,000 m^{2}) undeveloped north of 18th Street was completed in 2011, and included development of the area's shoreline and access points. In September 2009, a $10 million budget was approved to start development on the 6-acre (24,000 m^{2}) area along the Chicago River. The boathouse was opened on June 9, 2013. A new field house is under construction and is expected to open in September 2013.

== History ==
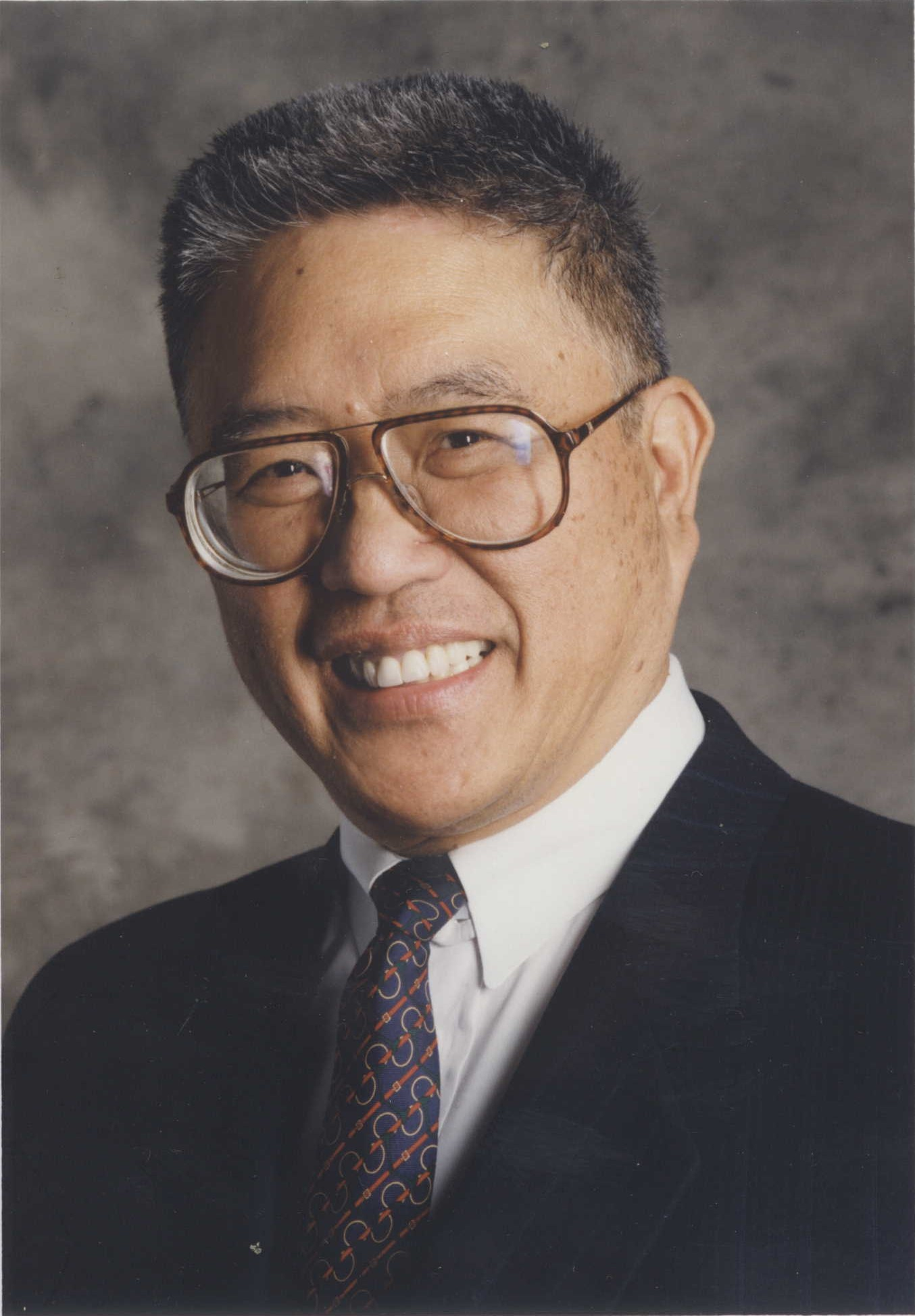
Civic leader Ping Tom played an important part in the park's creation, and it was named in his honor.

In 1962, construction preparations for the Dan Ryan Expressway necessitated the demolition of Hardin Square and Stanford Parks, the only two public parks that serviced the Chinatown community. In the mid-1970s, a small, 1/3 acre (1,300 m^{2}) park was developed on a strip of land between 26th Street and the Stevenson Expressway; the Chicago Park District purchased the park in 1977 and named it Sun Yat-sen Playlot Park. However, in a 1992 study, 75 percent of Chinatown's community leaders and 49 percent of business leaders felt that "the lack of open space in the Chinatown area is one of the most serious problems facing the community", and both groups ranked it first among 15 community issues, including crime, education, housing, and employment. Community efforts to construct a larger park were impeded both a lack of funds and the absence of any suitable site.

After fighting for decades for the construction of a new park in Chinatown, civic leader Ping Tom formed the Chinese American Development Corporation (CADC), a private real estate firm, in 1984. Five years later, the firm purchased a former 32-acre (130,000 m^{2}) Santa Fe rail yard and began construction on Chinatown Square, a $100 million residential and commercial development project. However, the 6 acres (24,000 m^{2}) area along the Chicago River was left untouched. The Chinatown community then formed the Chinatown Riverside Park Advisory Council to work with the Chicago Park District to assess the possibility of developing the remaining area into a public park. With the support of Park District Commissioner Raymond Lee, the Park District approved the proposal to purchase the land, along with an additional 6 acres (24,000 m^{2}) that extended along the river northward to 16th Street in 1991.

Tom died of pancreatic cancer in July 1995—three years before construction of the park began. During a Chinatown Chamber of Commerce meeting held in March 1998, the Riverside Park Advisory Council suggested renaming the park in honor of Ping Tom, the driving force behind its creation. The request was approved on August 3, 1998, and the park was renamed Ping Tom Memorial Park. The park was dedicated and officially opened by Chicago Mayor Richard M. Daley during a ceremony on October 2, 1999. In 2005, the CADC and friends of the Tom family commissioned sculptor Liao Huilana to create a bronze bust of Ping Tom. The bust was dedicated and installed at the park on October 22, 2005.

== Design and construction ==
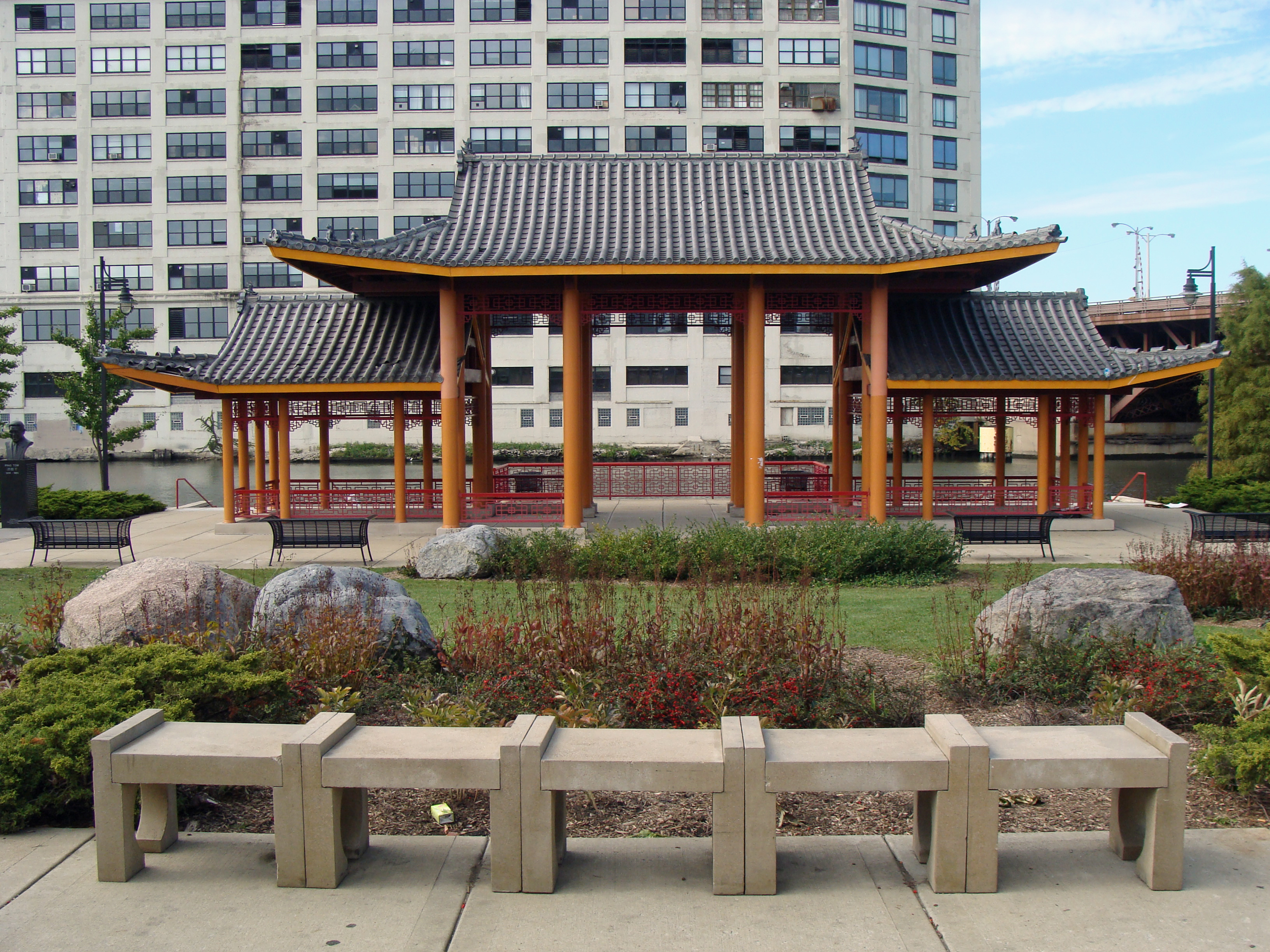
A pagoda-style pavilion is located near the park's eastern boundary—the Chicago River

Ernest C. Wong of Site Design Group designed the park. Having designed landscape along Chinatown's Cermak Avenue, Wong was familiar with the community and invited the public to voice their opinions and ideas for the future park. The park's original design called for walled plazas inspired by traditional Chinese gardens in Suzhou, China. This design was scrapped, however, because of security and vandalism concerns. Instead, a system of pathways was created to link defined spaces and mimic courtyards.

In Phase One of the park, a pagoda-style pavilion based on a structure that Wong had seen in Suzhou is located near the park's western boundary—the Chicago River. Site Design Group designed the pavilion's ornamentation and railings and obtained its traditional Chinese roof tiles from a source in Japan. The park's entrance is marked by the "Four Dragon Gateway", four 20 feet (6.1 m)-tall columns, each etched with Chinese dragons and is modeled after a traditional Chinese courtyard. The park contains Chinese-influenced gardens that include ginkgo trees and bamboo. Granite boulders are scattered throughout. A children's playground is located at the north end of the park.

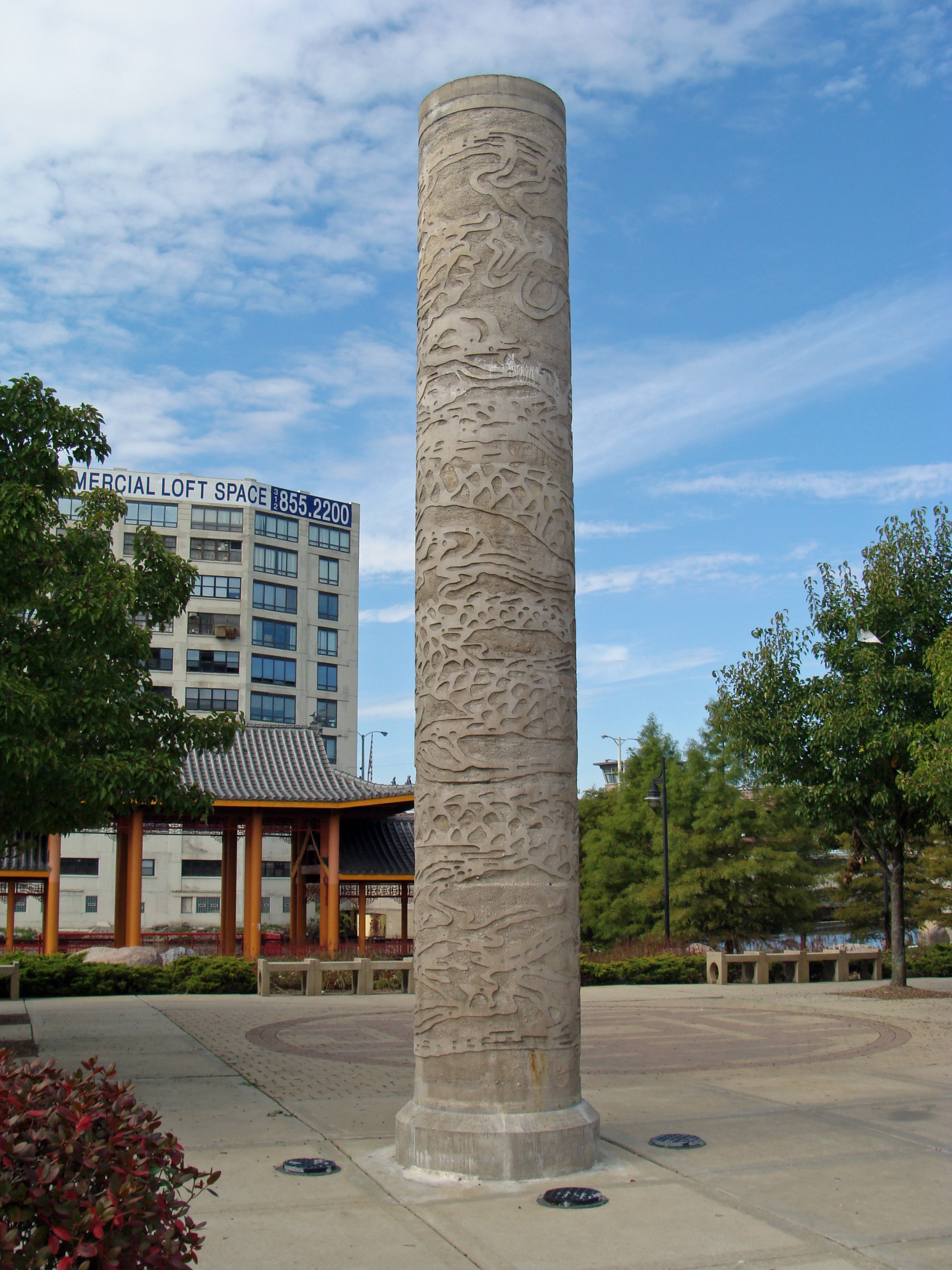
Ping Tom Pillar

Businesses in Chinatown attempted to raise $200,000 to build an 11-story bell tower pagoda at the south end of the park. The tower was planned to be constructed of brick and stone with a hollow interior. While visitors would not have been able to climb the structure, they would have been able to walk through an entrance at its base. Chicago Sun-Times writer Lee Bey believed the bell tower to be the park's most important feature. Despite the Taiwanese government making an early commitment to help finance the tower, it was never constructed.

Before construction of then-named Chinatown Riverside Park could begin on the strip of land south of 18th Street, the area required significant renovation. The entire western boundary of the park is a functioning BNSF rail track. After determining that underground or elevated access was not feasible, an at-grade rail crossing was constructed. The US Army Corps of Engineers then restored the badly deteriorated shoreline of the Chicago River, the park's western boundary. At a cost of $2 million, the project improved approximately 1,000 feet (300 m) of the retaining wall and lowered the shoreline considerably from its previous position 10 feet (3.0 m) above the river. The land was also tested for any harmful contaminants from prolonged use as a rail yard. Once renovations were complete, construction began in 1998 and concluded in fall 1999 at a total cost of $5 million.

=== Expansion ===
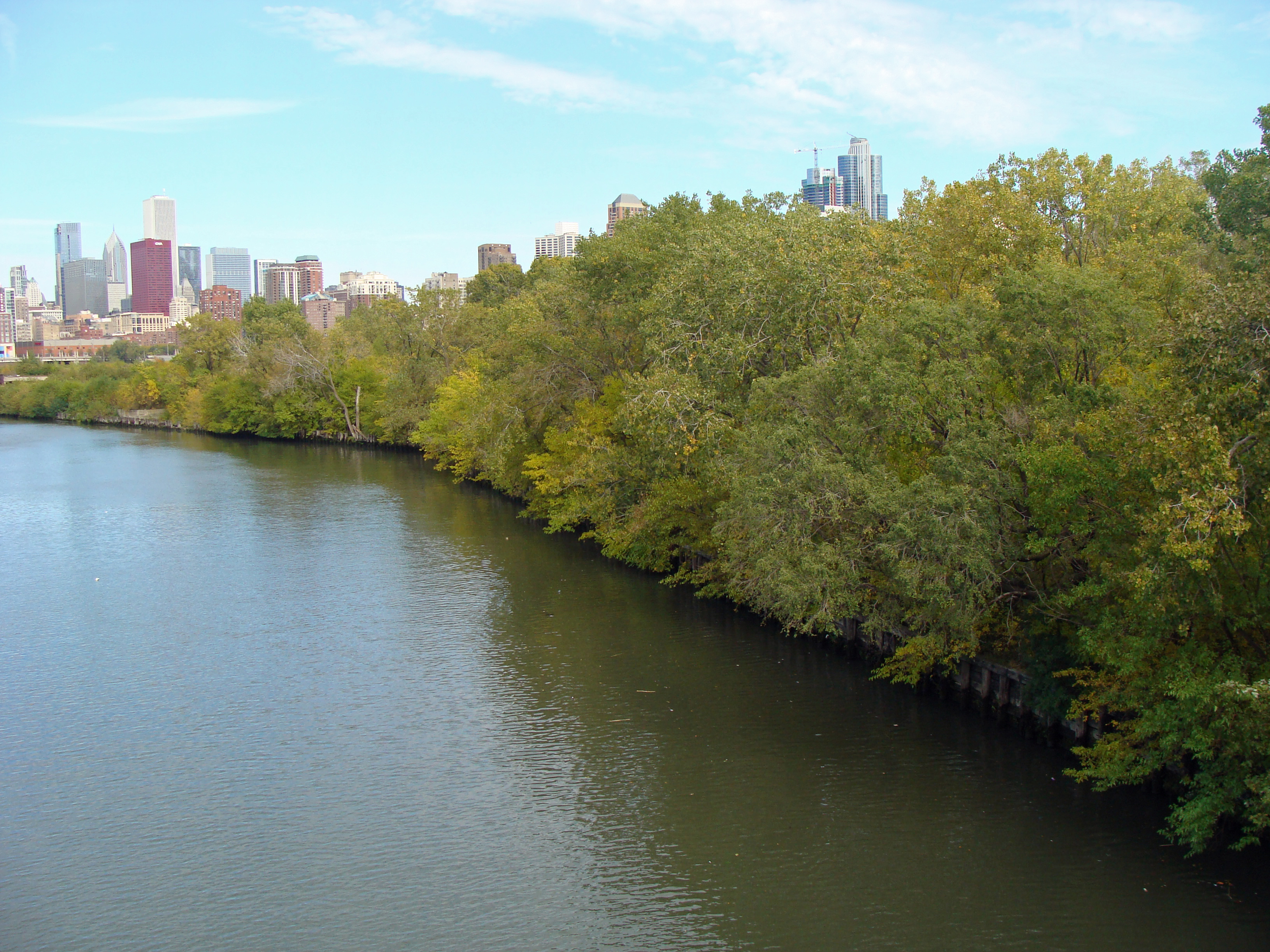
The park's undeveloped northern shoreline in 2009

In 2002, the Chicago Park District acquired an additional 5 acres (20,000 m^{2}) immediately east of the park's 6-acre (24,000 m^{2}) undeveloped northern half. With the acquisition of this land, the CPD planned a second development-stage—dubbed "Phase II"—of the park's nearly 11 acres (45,000 m^{2}) undeveloped. The plan called for the development of the area's shoreline and access points, as well as the construction of a cultural arts and recreational facility and a boathouse. The estimated cost was $38 million.

In September 2009, the Chicago Park District's Board of Commissioners entered into an agreement with the City of Chicago that approved the transfer of $10 million in tax increment financing (TIF) funds for the development of the park's 6-acre (24,000 m^{2}) area between the Chicago River and the BNSF rail track north of 18th Street (Phase Two). These funds were used to build a retaining wall, fish habitats and sections of natural shoreline along the area's 875 ft (267 m) of shoreline along the Chicago River. Open lawn and landscaped areas were developed along with a fishing station and various pathways.

In 2008, the Chicago Department of Transportation hired Knight E/A to redevelop the 18th street bridge underpass and create two plazas to extend the park north.

Approved also was an ordinance that finances the construction of an athletic field house in Ping Tom Memorial Park. Funds for the $10 million proposal were allocated from the River South TIF district.

On September 19, 2011, Mayor Rahm Emanuel held a press conference in the newly opened expansion of the park to announce a plan to build a series of boat houses along the Chicago River.

At about this time, the phase two five-acre riverfront expansion located to the north of the existing park expanded the park to the north of the 18th street bridge. It was also designed by Site Design Group, and features a 300 linear foot boardwalk with iconic red Chinese ornamental railings that extends over the water, as well as unique decorative limestone rocks called scholar's stones or Gongshi from Lake Tai in China. These stones came from a park in Orlando, Florida called "Florida Splendid China", owned by the Chinese government, that had gone bankrupt. Native plantings and oak savanna restoration provide a sustainable planting palette, welcoming native wildlife to the park. The project cost was $4.9 million.

On June 9, 2013, Mayor Emanuel officially opened the boathouse.

=== Fieldhouse ===
On October 14, 2013, Mayor Emanuel officially opened the Ping Tom Memorial Park Fieldhouse, a 30,000 square-foot facility with a gymnasium, natatorium, fitness center, and meeting rooms. During the ceremony it was also announced that a Yellow Crane statue would be placed in the lobby of the fieldhouse. A 2012 gift from Mayor Tang of Wuhan, China to the City of Chicago, the statue symbolizes the historic Yellow Crane Tower in Wuhan, considered to be among the Four Great Towers of China.

At the entrance to the fieldhouse stands a stainless steel sculpture called "Stone Talk", donated by the city of Shanghai on June 3, 2015, to commemorate the 30th anniversary of the Sister City relationship between Chicago and Shanghai.

On October 10, 2015, the fieldhouse was renamed the Leonard M. Louie Fieldhouse. Louie founded the Ping Tom Park Advisory Council in 1999, and was a two-term president of the Chinese American Civic Council of Chicago and a 23-year board member of the Chinese American Service League.

=== Murals ===
On July 28, 2018, the "All As One" mural was dedicated. Located in the east plaza of the 18th Street bridge underpass, it is modeled after the blue and white designs of Ming dynasty porcelain. The artists are Andy Bellamo, Chester Chow, and Anna Murphy.

On September 7, 2019, during a celebration of the 20th anniversary of the park, the "Between the Mountains and the Water" mural was dedicated in the west plaza of the 18th Street bridge underpass. This mural is patterned after Han dynasty silk landscape paintings. The artist is Anna Murphy. Also on that date, "Welcome to Ping Tom Memorial Park" and "Be Like Water" (上 善 若水) murals were dedicated on the westernmost support.

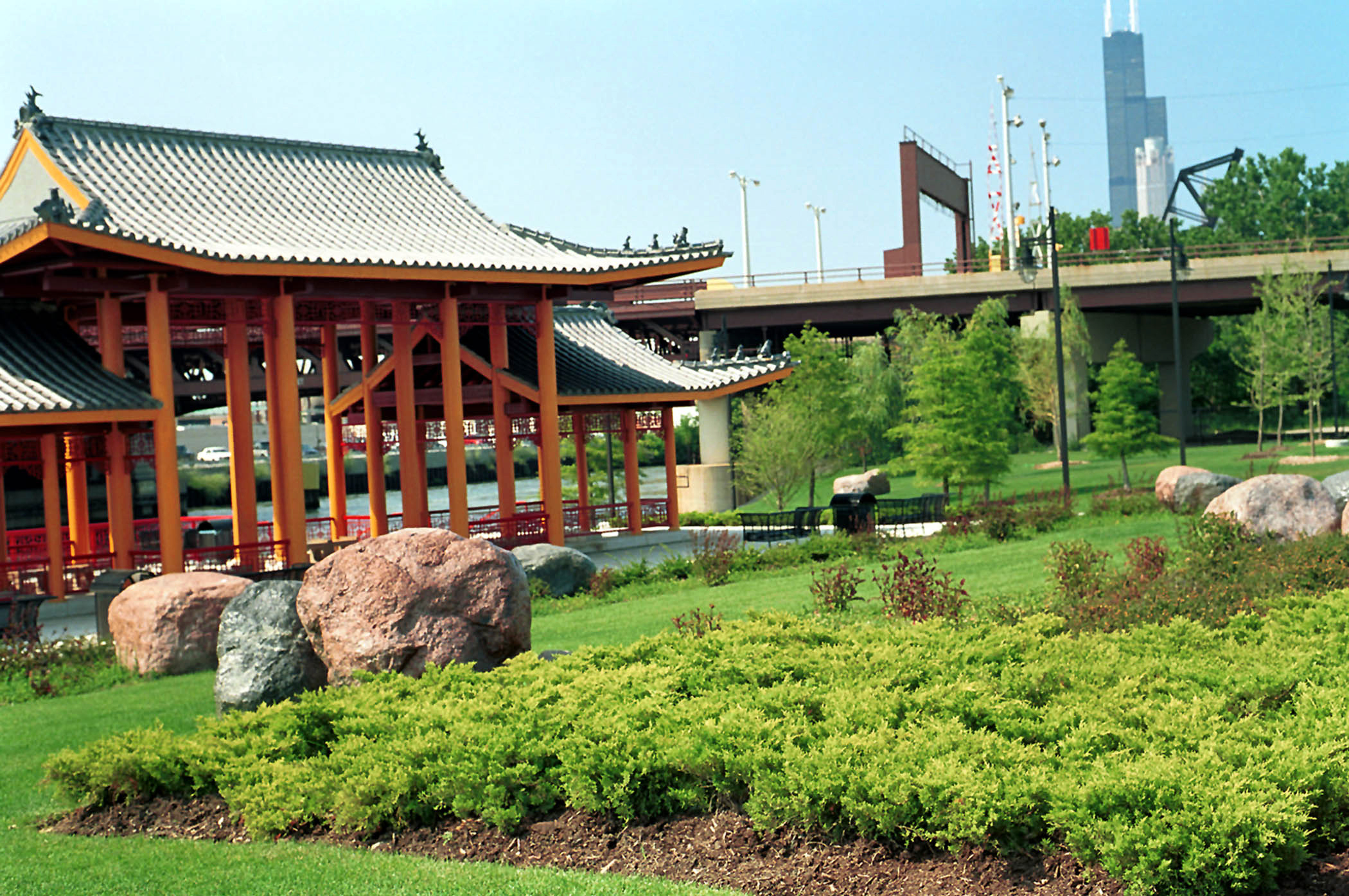
The park with seasonal planting

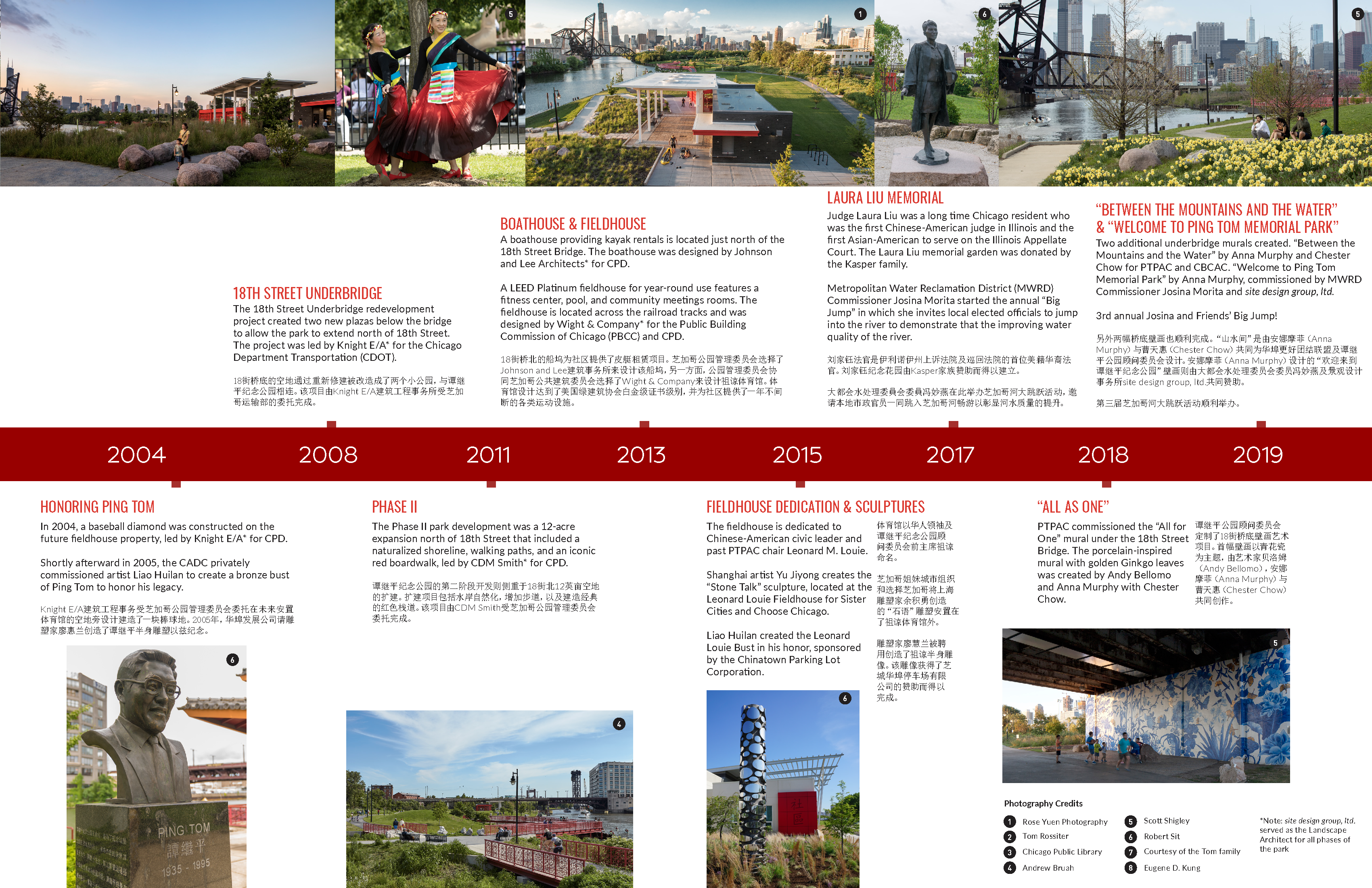
Timeline for the development of Ping Tom Memorial Park (1999–2019)

== Events ==
The Chicago Dragon Boat Race for Literacy, started in 1999, is a philanthropic event held annually at Ping Tom Memorial Park. Every summer, teams participate in a dragon boat race tournament organized by the Chicago Chinatown Chamber of Commerce, along the Chicago River while music, food and entertainment is provided for spectators. The race begins at the Canal Street railroad bridge, the only vertical-lift bridge on the Chicago River, and ends at the pavilion. The proceeds raised from the event are used to support and promote local literacy, cultural, and diversity programs. The park also served as the finish line to the Chicago River Flatwater Classic, a 7.25-mile (11.67 km) canoe and kayak race.

In 2004, the Chinatown Chamber of Commerce used hosted a free series of movies and concerts during their "Summer Fun in Chinatown" campaign. In late September, the Chicago-based Redmoon Theater performed Sink. Sank. Sunk..., an outdoor play at the park. The performance was the first in an annual series of site-specific plays created to introduce audiences to undiscovered, often-overlooked Chicago locations. The performance included floating props in the Chicago River and also incorporated the park's active, surrounding trains into the act.

The Season 6 finale of CBS's reality show The Amazing Race ended in Ping Tom Memorial Park. Contestants were instructed to make their way to the finish line in the park from a Gino's East pizzeria; however, after contestants hailed taxis, most of the drivers did not know where the park was located.
