= Hawaiian Chinese News =

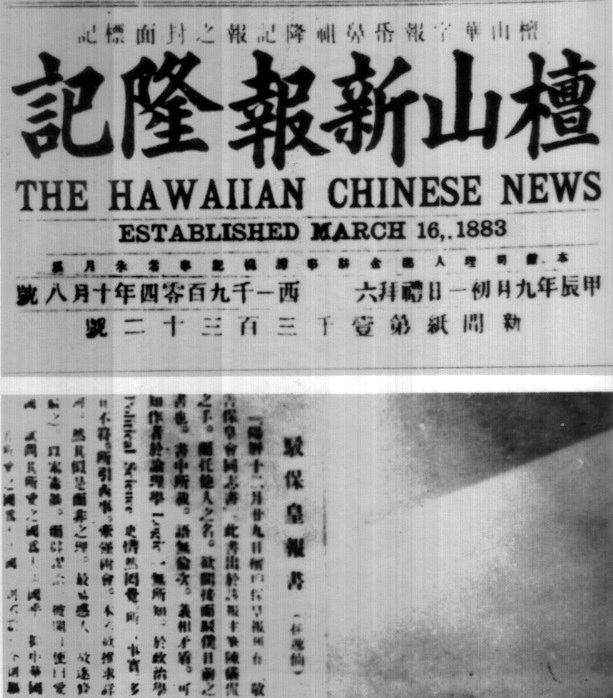
- Hawaiian Chinese News published on 8 October 1904
- Founded: 1881
- Ceased publication: 1907
- Headquarters: Honolulu
- OCLC number: 13178514

Hawaiian Chinese News
- Traditional Chinese: 檀山新報
- Simplified Chinese: 檀山新报
Transcriptions
Standard Mandarin
- Hanyu Pinyin: Tánshān xīnbào

The Hawaiian Chinese News (Chinese: 檀山新報; Jyutping: taan4 saan1 san1 bou3; pinyin: Tánshān xīnbào), also known as New Honolulu Journal, Tan Shan Hsin Pao, Lung Kee Sun Bo, was a Chinese language commercial newspaper in Honolulu, US. It was founded by Cheng Weinan in 1881, initially called the Lung Chi Pao (隆記報), renamed Tan Shan Hsin Pao (檀山新報) in 1903.

The earliest known preserved issue of the Hawaiian Chinese News, with the date of April 13, 1889, contains a report on the political situation in Samoa. It was the first Chinese language newspaper in Honolulu.

Hawaiian Chinese News was the voice of Sun Yat-sen and his revolutionary party. In 1907, the newspaper ceased publication.
