= Diversity in librarianship =

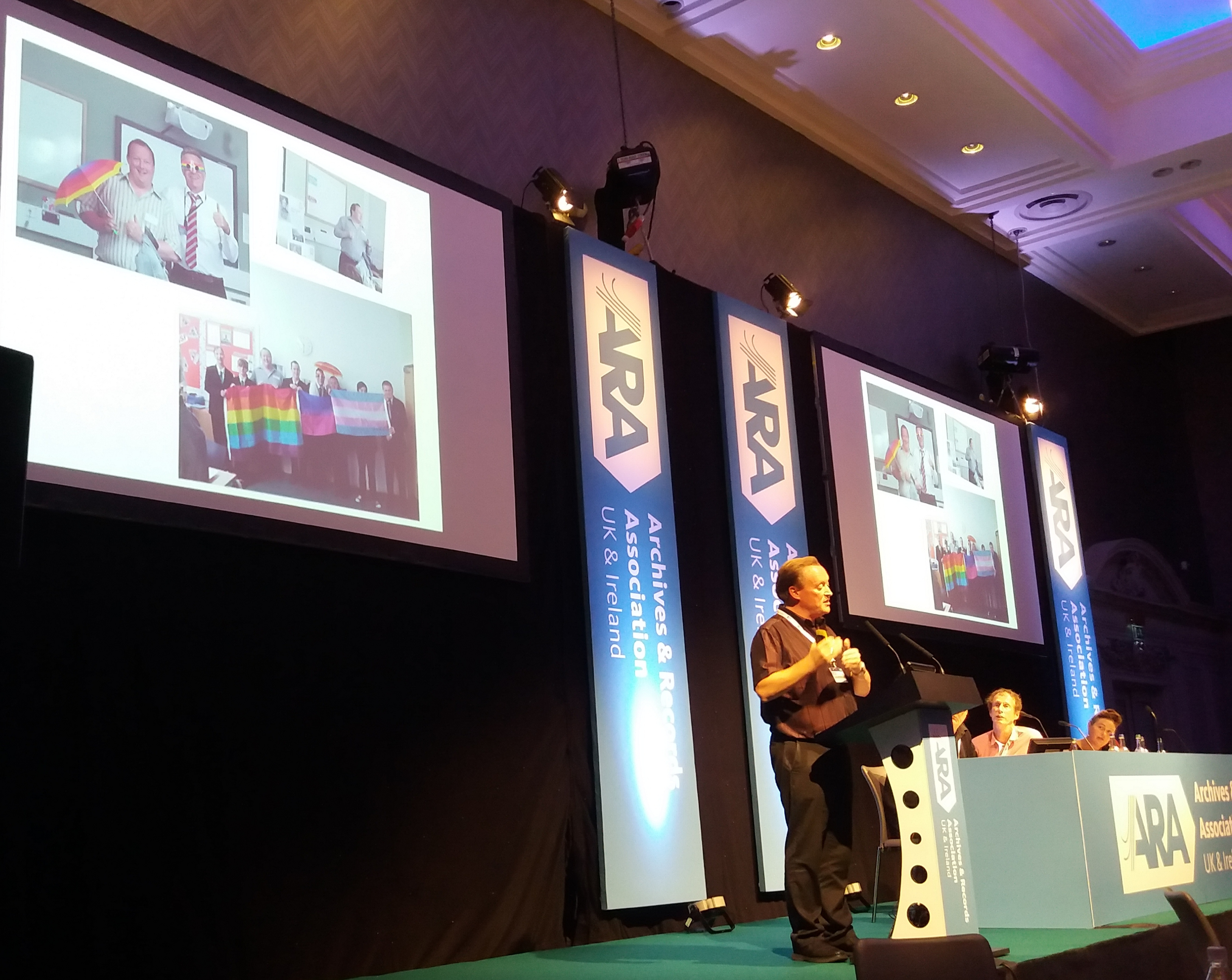
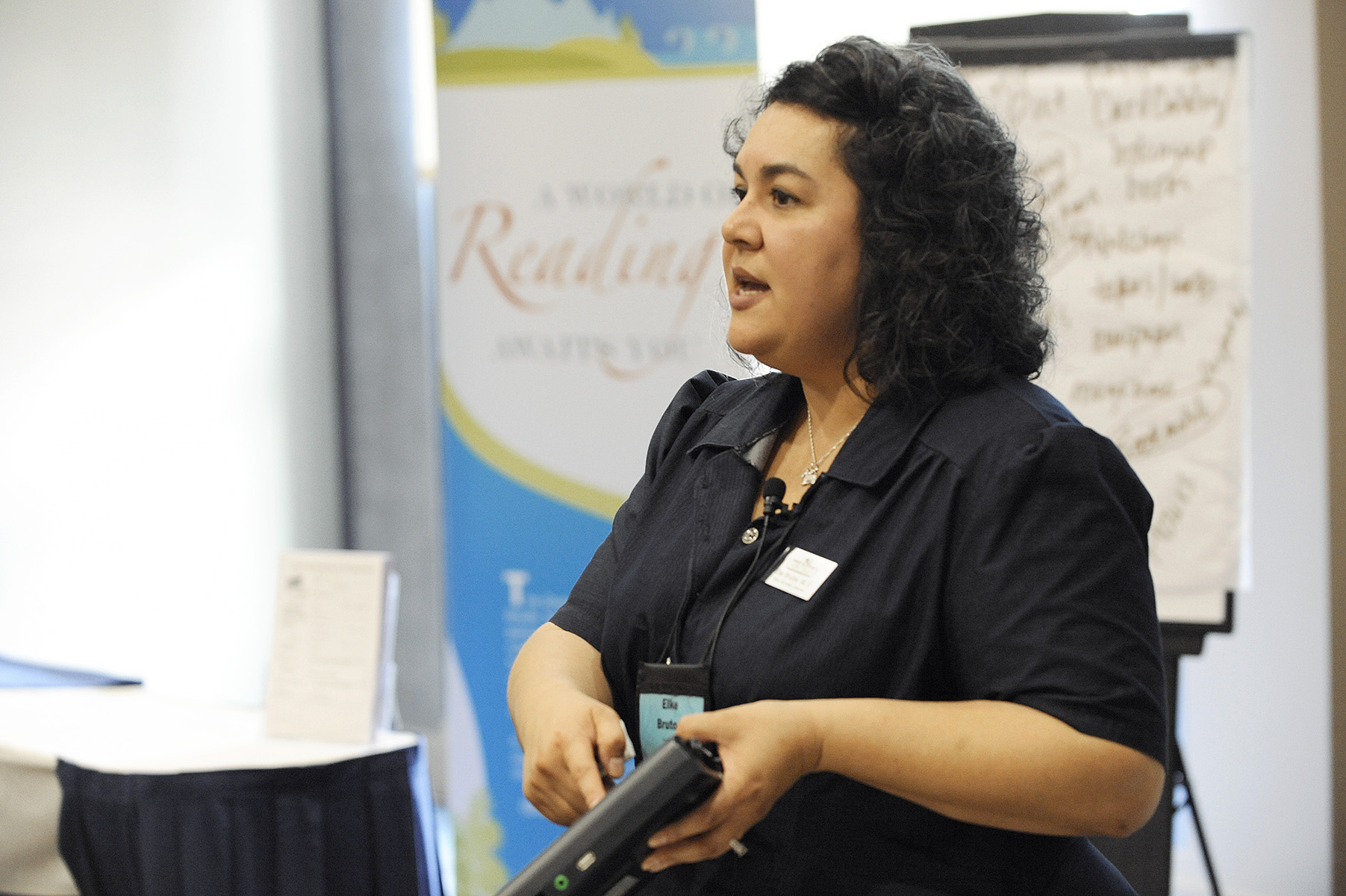
Diversity in librarianship and information management. Left: Dr Alan Butler from the Plymouth LGBT Archive presents a paper at the Archives and Records Association 2018 annual conference in Glasgow, UK. Right: Elke Bruton speaking at the event "Demystifying Oregon's Free Library for the Print Disabled".

Those working in the field of library science do not currently reflect the age, class, disabilities, ethnicity, gender identity, race, sex, and sexual orientation makeup of the populations they serve. There are efforts to provide a diverse working environment in libraries, with an eye towards ways to diversifying the status quo.

== United States ==
=== Statistics ===
The majority of librarians working in the U.S. are female, between the ages of 55–64, and Caucasian. A 2014 study by the American Library Association of research done from 2009 to 2010 shows that 98,273 of credentialed librarians were female while 20,393 were male. 15,335 of the total 111,666 were 35 and younger and only 6,222 were 65 or older. 104,393 were white; 6,160 African American, 3,260 Asian/Pacific Islander; 185 Native American including Alaskan; 1,008 of two or more races, and 3,661 Latino. (ALA).

In 2022 the paper "A Statistical Essay on Diversity in the Library Professions Compared to Other Occupations in the United States of America" traced the historical narrative spotlighting initiatives by the American Library Association and the establishment of ethnic professional library associations from the early 20th century.

=== Strategies ===
==== Scholarships and grants ====
To help change the lack of diversity in library jobs in the U.S., more scholarships and grants are emerging. Most library and information science students do not belong to an underrepresented group and as a reaction to these research statistics, the field is creating ways to encourage more diversity in the classroom.

===== ALA Annual Research Diversity Grant Program =====
The ALA Annual Research Diversity Grant Program is a way to encourage innovation in scholars and professionals to provide insight into how to diversify the field. The ALA Grant is directed toward those who have valuable and original research ideas that can add to the knowledge of diversity in the field of librarianship. The program awards up to three individuals once a year with a grant of $2,500 each. The applicants have submission guidelines, are given a timeline, and are shown the evaluation process online.

==== Cultural competencies ====
One way to nurture cultural diversity in the library field is with cultural competencies. Scholars recommend defining skills needed to serve and work with others who belong to different cultures. It is suggested that these definitions be posted in job listings and be referred to when promoting and giving raises. In library and information science graduate programs, it is also suggested by scholars that there is a lack of classes teaching students cultural competences. It is important for more classes to teach about diversity and measure the outcomes.

==== Recruitment ====
Another strategy is to create interest in the field of library and information science from a young age. If minorities do not desire to become librarians, they will not seek to obtain an MLS or MLIS and therefore will not fill high job roles in libraries. A recommended solutions are to create a great experience for all racial groups early on in life. This may inspire more young children to become interested in this field.

=== Resources ===
ALA Office for Diversity

The Office for Diversity is a sector of the American Library Association whose purpose is to aid libraries in providing a diverse workforce, gathering data, and teaching others about the issue of diversity related to the field of library and information science.

==== Race and ethnicity-related resources ====
American Indian Library Association

The American Indian Library Association (AILA) was created in 1979. It publishes a newsletter twice a year and educates individuals and groups about Indian culture.

Asian Pacific American Librarians Association

The Asian Pacific American Librarians Association (APALA), also known as the Asian/Pacific American Librarians Association, is an affiliate of the American Library Association (ALA) formed to "address the needs of Asian/Pacific American librarians and those who serve Asian/Pacific American communities." APALA was the successor to the Asian American Librarians Caucus (AALC), a discussion group within the ALA Office for Library Outreach Services that focused on providing library service to minority communities and on supporting minority librarians. APALA was established in 1980, was incorporated in 1981, and became part of the ALA in 1982. The founders of APALA included Lourdes Collantes, Suzine Har Nicolescu, Sharad Karkhanis, Conchita Pineda, Henry Chang, Betty Tsai, and Tamiye Trejo Meehan.

Black Caucus of the American Library Association

The Black Caucus of the American Library Association, founded in 1970, promotes not only library services that can be enjoyed by the African American community but also the emergence of African American librarians and library professionals. By joining the association, patrons have access to newsletters, the entirety of their website, and networking boards.

Chinese American Librarians Association, also known as 華人圖書館員協會

The Mid-West Chinese American Librarians Association began on March 31, 1973, founded by Dr. Tze-Chung Li and Dorothy Li, as a regional organization in Illinois. Then in 1974 the Chinese Librarians Association was founded in California. In 1976, the Mid-West Chinese American Librarians Association expanded to a national organization as the Chinese American Librarians Association. In 1983 the Chinese American Librarians Association and the Chinese Librarians Association were merged into one organization, under the name Chinese American Librarians Association (in English) and the Chinese Librarians Association's Chinese name (華人圖書館員協會). This one organization has members not only in America but in China, Hong Kong, Canada, and more. The organization promotes the Chinese culture through the outlet of libraries and communicates with others in the profession of librarianship.

HBCU Library Alliance

The HBCU Library Alliance is a consortium of libraries at Historically Black Colleges and Universities (HBCUs). Founded in 2002 by deans and directors of libraries at HBCUs, the consortium comprises over 100 member organizations. The alliance specifically represents the organizations included in the White House HBCU Initiative. In 2019 the HBCU Library Alliance entered into a national partnership with the Council on Library and Information Resources.

REFORMA

REFORMA is the American national library association to promote library and information services to Latino and the Spanish speaking. The National Association of Spanish Speaking Librarians in the United States, which would later be called REFORMA, was founded in 1971 by Arnulfo Trejo and Elizabeth Martinez. In 1983, the name was changed to REFORMA, the National Association to Promote Library Services to the Spanish Speaking, to better reflect the goal of the association. It is now known as REFORMA: The National Association to Promote Library & Information Services to Latinos and the Spanish Speaking, or just REFORMA. REFORMA has pushed for Spanish collections in libraries, gives out yearly scholarships, and sends out quarterly newsletters. One of REFORMA‘s main goals is to recruit Latinos into professional positions of the library.

Joint Council of Librarians of Color

The Joint Council of Librarians of Color (JCLC, Inc.) was founded in June 2015 as an organization “that advocates for and addresses the common needs of the American Library Association ethnic affiliates.“ These ethnic affiliates include: the American Indian Library Association, the Asian Pacific American Librarians Association, the Black Caucus of the American Library Association, the Chinese American Librarians Association (also known as 華人圖書館員協會), and REFORMA: The National Association to Promote Library & Information Services to Latinos and the Spanish Speaking.

=== American deafness issues ===
The American Library Association has stated that disabled people belong to a minority that is often overlooked and underrepresented by people in the library, and the Deaf community belongs in this minority group. The ALA’s Library Bill of Rights preamble states that "all libraries are forums for information and ideas" and as such libraries need to remove the physical and technological barriers which in turn would allow persons with disabilities full access to the resources available.

One notable American activist in the library community working toward accessibility for the deaf was Alice Lougee Hagemeyer, herself deaf. In 1974 she created Deaf Awareness Week, later called Deaf Heritage Week, in which programs about deaf culture are held in libraries. In 1980 she founded the unit now known as the Library Service to People who are Deaf or Hard of Hearing Forum, which is a unit within the American Library Association.

In 2006 the American Library Association and the National Association of the Deaf declared that they would recognize March 13 to April 15 as National Deaf History Month.

==== Deaf services at libraries ====
The library at Gallaudet University, the only deaf liberal arts university in the United States, was founded in 1876. The library's collection has grown from a small number of reference books to the world's largest collection of deaf-related materials, with over 234,000 books and thousands of other materials in different formats. The collection is so large that the library had to create a hybrid classification system based on the Dewey Decimal Classification System in order to make cataloging and location within the library easier for both library staff and users. The library also houses the university's archives, which holds some of the oldest deaf-related books and documents in the world.

One notable American activist in the library community working toward accessibility for the deaf was Alice Lougee Hagemeyer, herself deaf. In 1974 she created Deaf Awareness Week, later called Deaf Heritage Week, in which programs about deaf culture are held in libraries.

In Nashville, Tennessee, Sandy Cohen manages the Library Services for the Deaf and Hard of Hearing (LSDHH). The program was created in 1979 in response to information accessibility issues for the deaf in the Nashville area. Originally, the only service provided was the news via a teletypewriter or TTY, but today, the program has expanded to serving the entire state of Tennessee by providing all different types of information and material on deafness, deaf culture, and information for family members of deaf people, as well as a historical and reference collection.

=== Women and librarianship ===
Librarianship manifests a dual career structure for men and women in the United States. While the ratio of female to male librarians remains roughly 4:1, top positions are more often held by men. In large academic libraries, there is less of a discrepancy; however, overall, throughout the profession, men tend to hold higher or leadership positions. Women, however, have made continuous progress toward equality. Women have also been largely left out of standard histories of U.S. librarianship, but Suzanne Hildenbrand's scholarly assessment of the work done by women has expanded the historical record. (Note: See also The Role of women in librarianship, 1876–1976: the entry, advancement, and struggle for equalization in one profession, by Kathleen Weibel, Kathleen M. Heim, and Dianne J. Ellsworth (1979), Phoenix, Ariz: Oryx Press.) Oral histories of women of color in librarianship, a project of the American Library Association Committee on the Status of Women in Librarianship, are available at the American Library Association Archives. Transcripts of the interviews were published in 1998.

==== Professional associations ====
There are multiple groups within the American Library Association dedicated to discussing, critiquing, and furthering gender-related and feminist issues within the profession.

The American Library Association's Social Responsibilities Round Table Feminist Task Force (FTF) was founded in 1970 by women who wished to address sexism in libraries and librarianship. FTF was the first ALA group to focus on women's issues. In recent years during Women's History Month (March), the FTF has dedicated their efforts to expanding women's library history online, using the website Women of Library History.

The Committee on the Status of Women in Librarianship (COSWL) of the American Library Association, founded in 1976, represents the diversity of women's interest within ALA and ensures that the Association considers the rights of the majority (women) in the library field, and promotes and initiates the collection, analysis, dissemination, and coordination of information on the status of women in librarianship. The bibliographic history of women in U.S. librarianship and women librarians developing services for women has been well-documented in the series of publications initially issued by the Social Responsibilities Round Table Task Force on Women and later continued by COSWL.

The ALA also has the Women & Gender Studies Section (WGSS) of its Division "Association of College & Research Libraries"; this section was formed to discuss, promote, and support women's studies collections and services in academic and research libraries.

In 1970, the ALA founded the ALA's Task Force on Gay Liberation, becoming the first professional organization of LGBTQ in the U.S. In 1975 the name of the organization changed to "Gay Task Force," in 1986 it changed again to "Gay and Lesbian Task Force," in 1995 the name changed once more to "Gay, Lesbian, and Bisexual Task Force," and finally in 1999 it became the "Gay, Lesbian, Bisexual, Transgender Round Table." The group dealt with sexuality, with much of the roundtable's work feminist in nature, and was concerned with issues of gender. The GLBTRT was committed to serving the information needs of the GLBT professional library community, and the GLBT information and access needs of individuals at large. In 2019, it was renamed as the Rainbow Round Table (RRT) and fulfilled the same duties and responsibilities as the GLBTRT.

The American Library Association Equality Award recognizes achievement for outstanding contribution toward promoting equality in the library profession, either by a sustained contribution or a single outstanding accomplishment.

==== Scholastics ====
Many scholars within the profession have taken up gender and its relationship to the discipline of library and information science. Scholars including Hope A. Olson, Sarah M. Pritchard and Sanford Berman have directed efforts at the problematic nature of cataloging and classification standards and schemes that are obscuring or exclusionary to marginalized groups. Others have written about the implications of gendered stereotypes in librarianship, particularly as they relate to library instruction. Library instruction also intersects with feminist pedagogy, and scholars such as Maria Accardi have written about feminist pedagogical practices in libraries. Library scholars have also dealt with issues of gender and leadership, having equitable gender representation in library collection development, and issues of gender and young adult and children's librarianship.

==== Policies ====
The ALA Policy Manual states under B.2.1.15 Access to Library Resources and Services Regardless of Sex, Gender Identity, Gender Expression, or Sexual Orientation (Old Number 53.1.15): "The American Library Association stringently and unequivocally maintains that libraries and librarians have an obligation to resist efforts that systematically exclude materials dealing with any subject matter, including sex, gender identity or expression, or sexual orientation. The Association also encourages librarians to proactively support the First Amendment rights of all library users, regardless of sex, sexual orientation, or gender identity or expression. Adopted 1993, amended 2000, 2004, 2008, 2010." It also states under B.2.12 Threats to Library Materials Related to Sex, Gender Identity, or Sexual Orientation (Old Number 53.12), "The American Library Association supports the inclusion in library collections of materials that reflect the diversity of our society, including those related to sex, sexual orientation, and gender identity or expression. ALA encourages all American Library Association chapters to take active stands against all legislative or other government attempts to proscribe materials related to sex, sexual orientation, and gender identity or expression; and encourages all libraries to acquire and make available materials representative of all the people in our society. Adopted 2005, Amended 2009, 2010."

==== Other aspects ====
In 1852, the first female clerk was hired for the Boston Public Library.

In 1890, Elizabeth Putnam Sohier and Anna Eliot Ticknor became the first women appointed to a United States state library agency—specifically, the Massachusetts Board of Library Commissioners.

There was a "Women's Meeting" at the 1882 14th American Libraries Conference, where issues concerning the salaries of women librarians and what female patrons do in reading rooms were discussed.

During the first 35 years of the American Library Association its presidency was held by men. In 1911 Theresa Elmendorf became the first woman elected president of the ALA. She was ALA president from May 24, 1911, until July 2, 1912.

In 1919, an ALA resolution promoting equal pay and opportunities for women in librarianship was defeated by a large margin.

In 1970, Betty Wilson brought forth a resolution that would have had the ALA refrain from using facilities that discriminate against women. That resolution was also defeated by the membership.

Also in 1970, Clara Stanton Jones became the first woman (and the first African-American) to serve as director of a major library system in America, as director of the Detroit Public Library.

In 1971, Effie Lee Morris became the first woman (and first black person) to serve as president of the Public Library Association.

In 1972, Celeste West co-founded Booklegger Press, the first woman-owned American library publisher, with Sue Critchfield and Valerie Wheat.

In 1973, Page Ackerman became University Librarian for the University of California, Los Angeles, and thus became the United States's first female librarian of a system as large and complex as UCLA's.

In 1976, the Council of the American Library Association passed a "Resolution on Racism and Sexism Awareness" during the ALA's Centennial Conference in Chicago, July 18–24.

In 1977, the ALA took a stand for the Equal Rights Amendment. The organization stated that they would no longer hold conferences in states that did not ratify the amendment, with the boycott measure set to take place in 1981. An ERA Task Force was formed in 1979 towards this goal and a sum of $25,000 was allocated towards task force operations in unratified states. At the time, a number of state library associations passed pro-ERA resolutions and formed committees on women in libraries.

In 1985, Susan Luévano-Molina became the first female president of REFORMA.

In 2013–2014, 82% of graduates in Master of Library Science (MLS) programs were female.

In 2016, Carla Hayden became the first female Librarian of Congress.

In 2018-2019, 82.2% of graduates with a MLS were women, although only 4.5% were Black women, 7.8% were Latina, and 2.5% were Asian/Pacific Islander.

In 2020, 83.2% of librarians were women, and 77.5% of library technicians and assistants, above the average of 73.5% for women who were "employed in all education and library professions," in line with predominantly employment by women for many years.

== International observations ==
In 2022, Coleman examined equity, diversity, inclusion, and accessibility efforts in libraries from an international perspective. Her study is globally-minded with a focus on universal human justice and sustainability. The international contexts are assessed through UN Sustainable Development Goals, world poverty, and disability statistics.
