= American Library Association Equality Award =

Professional award

The American Library Association Equality Award has been given annually by the American Library Association since 1984 in recognition of achievement for outstanding contribution toward promoting equality in the library profession, either by a sustained contribution or a single outstanding accomplishment. The award may be given for an activist or scholarly contribution in such areas as pay equity, affirmative action, legislative work and non-sexist education. The inaugural award was bestowed on Margaret Myers, Director, Office of Library Personnel Resources of the American Library Association in 1984.

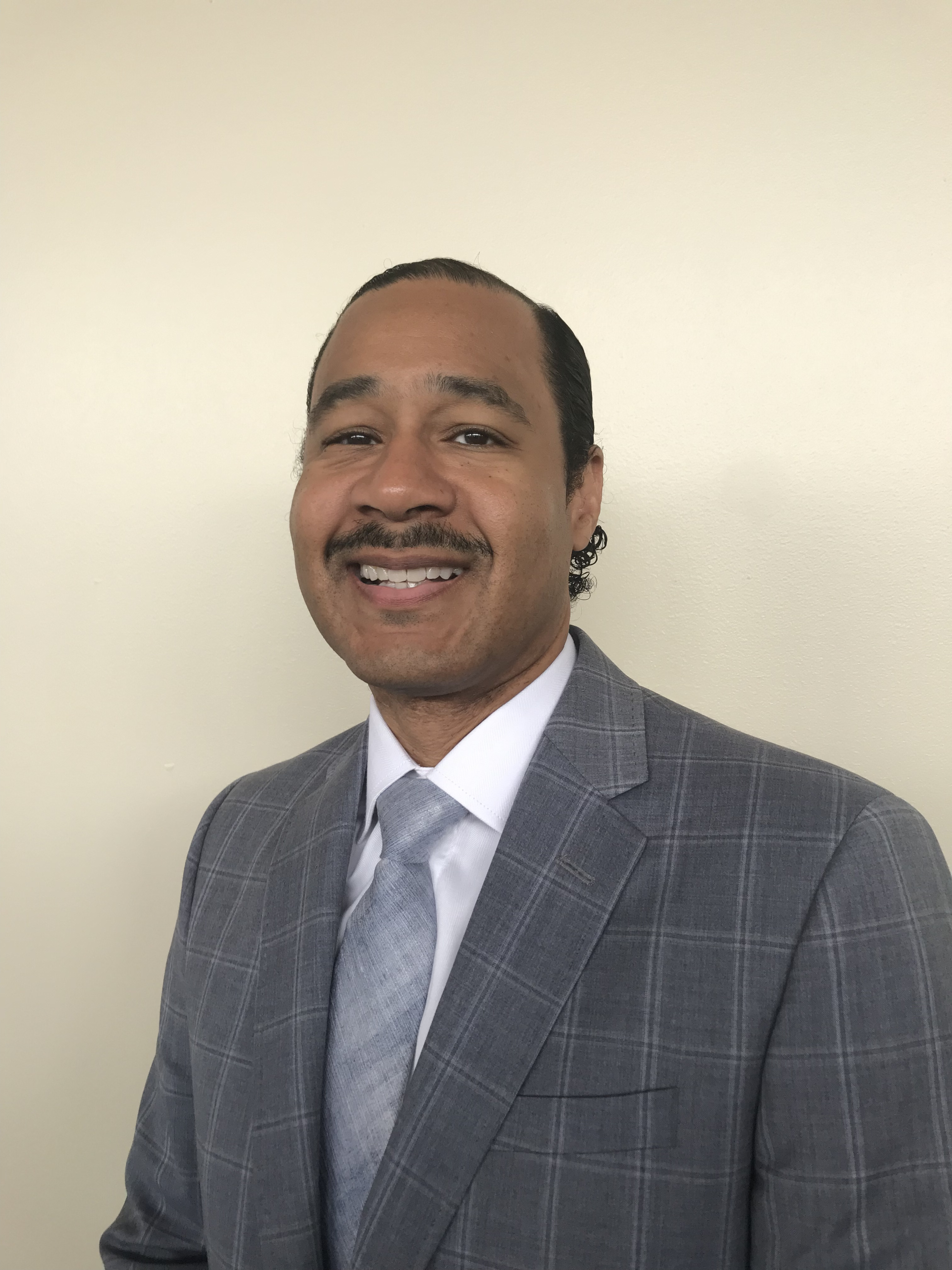
Julius C. Jefferson Jr., Equality Award, 2019

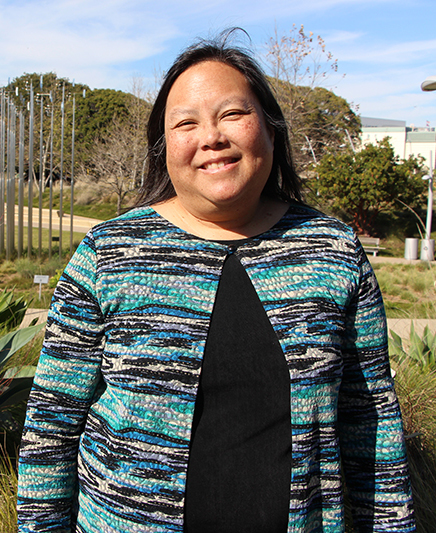
Patty Wong, Equality Award, 2012

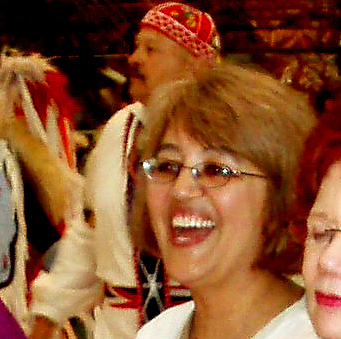
Loriene Roy, Equality Award, 2006

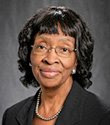
Dr. Alma Dawson, Equality Award, 2005

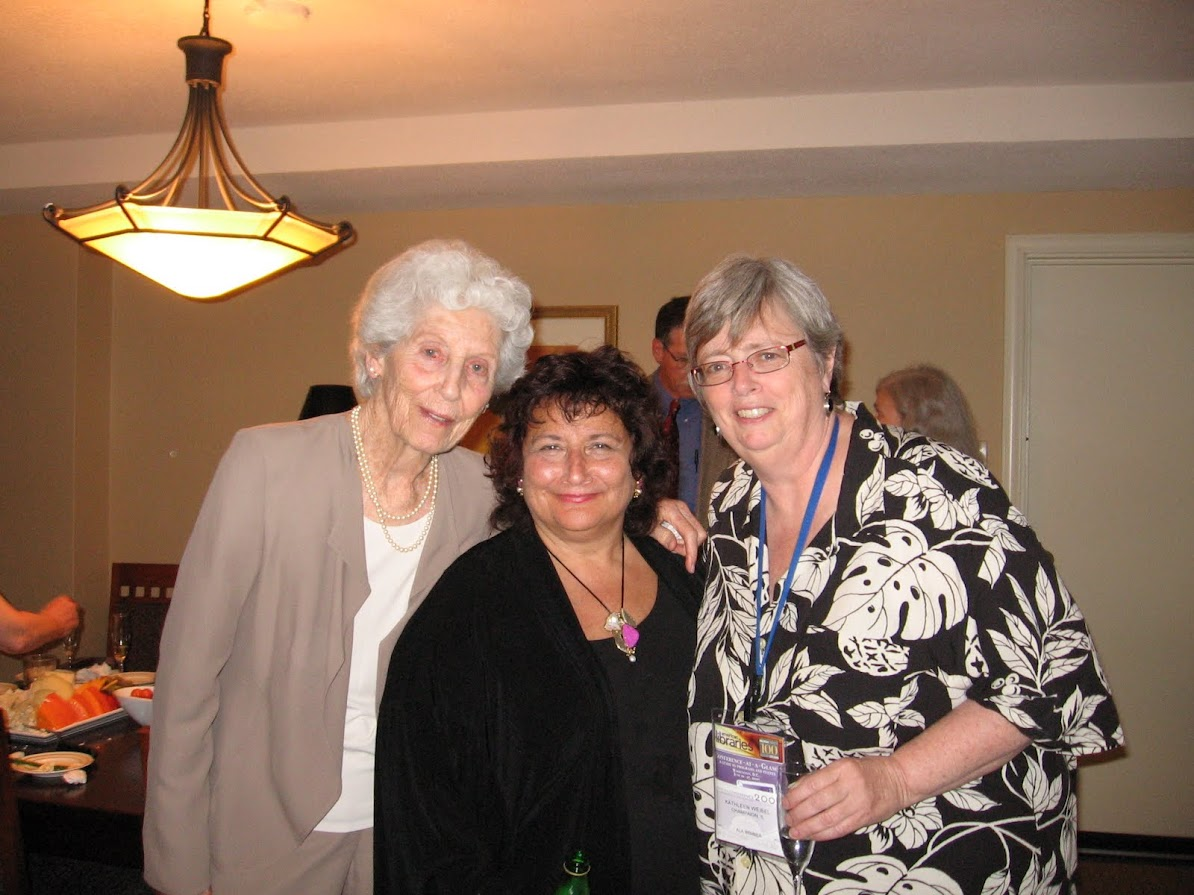
Three Equality Award honorees: Anita Schiller (1985), Patricia G. Schuman (1993), and Kathleen Weibel (1988) in 2007 at ALA Annual Conference, in Washington, D.C.

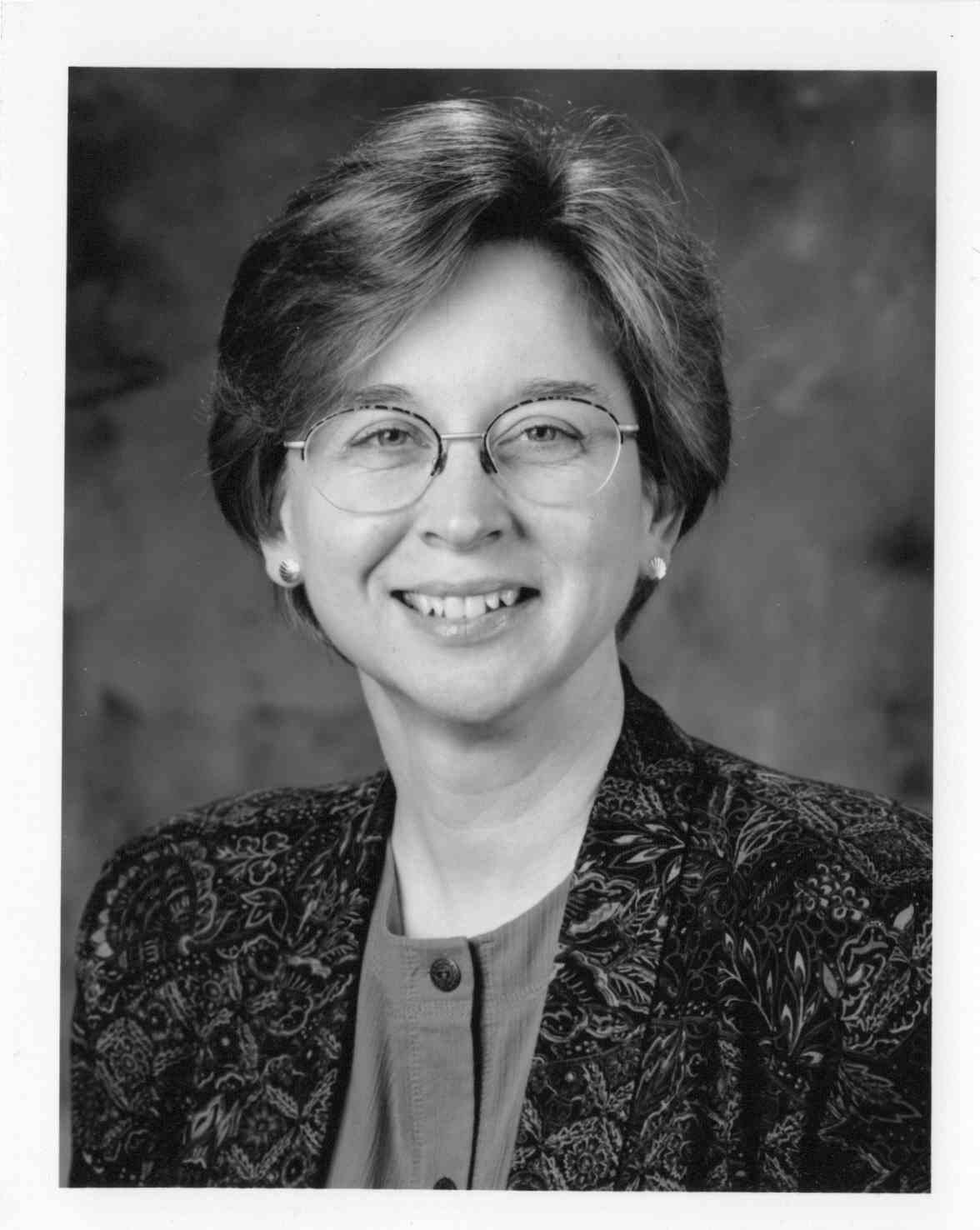
Sarah M. Pritchard, Equality Award, 1997

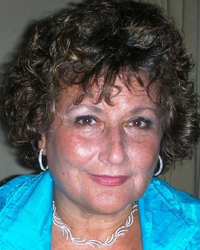
Patricia G. Schuman, Equality Award, 1993

Date	Equality Award Recipient	Contributions
2025	Kennesaw State University, (Georgia) Libraries Recruitment and Retention Task Force, with Karen Doster-Greenleaf and Kristina Clement.	Kennesaw State University created a better hiring and onboarding process and an adaptable framework that other libraries can replicate highlighting the importance of equity in librarianship.
2024	Felton Thomas Jr.	President, Public Library Association, created Task Force on Equity, Diversity, Inclusion and Social Justice.
2023	Susan Kusel	Advocate for minority concerns of Judaic librarianship, the Jewish patron community, and the ongoing struggle to have Jewish concerns included in diversity justice efforts. Library Journal Award.
2022	Fulton County Library, McConnellsburg, PA, and community activists Sarah Cutchall and Emily Best.	Standing up to County Commission labeling LGBTQ+ as "hate group."
2021	Joint Council of Librarians of Color (JCLC)	Purpose Statement of the JCLC is “to promote librarianship within communities of color, support literacy and the preservation of history and cultural heritage, collaborate on common issues, and to host the Joint Conference of Librarians of Color every four years.”
2020	Em Claire Knowles	Diversity Summits, Black Caucus of the American Library Association, Joint Conference of Librarians of Color
2019	Lorelle R. Swader	Organized annual National Library Workers’ Day and ALA Allied Professional Association committees and taskforces focusing on diversity and inclusion, including Spectrum Scholarship and Emerging Leaders.
2019	Julius C. Jefferson Jr.	Co-edited, 21st Century Black Librarian in America: Issues and Challenges , advocate for equality in librarianship.
2018	Alexandra Rivera	Chair, ALA Diversity Committee; Joint Council of Librarians of Color; Peer Information Counseling Program.
2017	Haipeng Li	Joint Conference of Librarians of Color, President, Chinese American Librarians Association
2016	Nicole A. Cooke	"staunch champion for inclusion and has led the charge in changing the education of librarians to make them better able to serve those, who to date, have been unserved or underserved."
2015	Camila Alire	Author, Serving Latino Communities, support of Spectrum Scholarship Initiative.
2014	Ann K. Symons	"an active and effective supporter of intellectual freedom, focusing extensively on school libraries and GLBT issues."
2013	Elizabeth Martinez	Co-founder of REFORMA, Co-chair, ALA policy on diversity “Equity at Issue,” developed Spectrum Scholarship program.
2012	Patricia "Patty" Wong	JCLC Advocacy Award, Asian Pacific American Librarians Association, California State Library initiatives for service to diverse communities, Spectrum scholarship committees.
2011	Joan R. Giesecke	As dean of libraries, University of Nebraska–Lincoln increased diversity from 2% in 2000 to 12% in 2010, Association of Research Libraries, Diversity Committee.
2010	Patricia Tarin	1991 Hispanic Librarian of the Year-REFORMA, initiated and directed Knowledge River, University of Arizona School of Information Resources and Library Science, “Guidelines for Library Service to the Spanish-Speaking” (ALA, 1978).
2009	Karen Downing	University of Michigan Library Diversity Award; work with ALA Spectrum initiative and "an enduring legacy of positive change in librarianship by investing her energy, passion and dedication to fostering equality throughout the profession."
2008	Liana Zhou	Director, Library and Archives, Kinsey Institute for Research in Sex, Gender and Reproduction; president of the Chinese American Librarians Association.
2007	Kenneth A. Yamashita	Co-chair, first Joint Conference of Librarians of Color. Author, "Asian/Pacific American Librarians Association— A History of APALA and Its Founders."
2007	Gladys Smiley Bell	Co-chair, first Joint Conference of Librarians of Color.
2006	Loriene Roy	President, American Indian Library Association, Anishinabe, a member of the Minnesota Chippewa Tribe, enrolled on the White Earth Reservation, member of the International Indigenous Librarians Council, author.
2005	Alma Dawson	Russell B. Long Professor at the School of Library & Information Science, Louisiana State University for "leadership in affirmative action efforts in library and information science, both as a librarian and as a library educator," author, The African-American Reader’s Advisor.
2004	Janet B. Wojnaroski	School library media specialist at Kent (Ohio) Roosevelt High School, "commitment to building connections between schools, institutions, and the general community, fostered awareness of African-American history and culture, brought the generations together in a shared endeavor, and preserved the history of Kent, Ohio, and its people."
2003	Carla J. Stoffle	Dean of libraries, University of Arizona in Tucson "mentored countless individuals and instituted a number of programs, including Peer Information Counseling, a minority outreach program where undergraduate minority students serve as information role models to other students. She supports the recruitment and retention of librarians of color and advocated for a two-year program that brings new librarians of color to work in academic internships."
2002	Clara Chu	Scholar at Department of Information Studies University of California-Los Angeles who specializes in the social construction of information systems, institutions and access to help understand the usage of and barriers to information in multicultural communities.
2001	Doris Seale	Combined her heritage as a Santee Dakota, Abenaki and Cree woman with her vocations - librarian, teacher and writer - to facilitate positive change in the representation of American Indians in library resources. Author, A Broken Flute : The Native Experience in Books for Children.
2000	Florence Simkins Brown	First African American librarian to chair ALA's Chapter Relations Committee; primary role in development of "Stop Talking and Start Doing! Recruitment and Retention of People of Color to the Profession" initiative.
1999	Kansas City Public Library (MO)	"bold, ongoing, and unfaltering commitment to making equality part of the library's organizational culture and thereby being a model for other service agencies," recognized for "serving a city one-by-one, by fully embracing the ideals of equity and diversity."
1998	Betty J. Turock	President, American Library Association, founder of Spectrum Scholarship Program, professor Rutgers School of Communication and Information, author, "Women and Leadership."
1997	Sarah M. Pritchard	American Library Association, Committee on the Status of Women in Librarianship, chair Women's Studies Section of the Association of College and Research Libraries, Women's Studies Specialist at the Library of Congress, author of "The Impact of Feminism on Women in the Profession,"
1996	Michele Leber	Represented American Library Association on the National Committee on Pay Equity. Editor of Women in Libraries, ALA Special Presidential Task Force on Better Salaries and Pay Equity.
1995	Wisconsin Women Library Workers	Wisconsin Women Library Workers is a feminist organization committed to improving the status of women in the library field and to the elimination of sex role stereotyping and sex bias.
1994	Lotsee Patterson	Comanche librarian, educator, founder of the American Indian Library Association, Co-chair, White House Conference (1992) Pathways to Excellence: Improving Library and Information Services for Native American Peoples.
1993	Patricia G. Schuman	American Library Association Honorary Member, Founder, Social Responsibilities Round Table, and co-founder of the SRRT Feminist Task Force, first woman treasurer (1984–88) of the American Library Association. President of the American Library Association.
1992	Susan Ellis Searing	Instrumental in developing Women's Studies as a field. Author, Introduction to Library Research in Women's Studies, American Women’s History"Women's Studies for a “Women's” Profession.
1991	E.J. Josey	Civil Rights leader, founder and leader of the Black Caucus of the American Library Association, President, American Library Association, Author, The Black Librarian in America.
1990	Betty-Carol Sellen	Founder, Social Responsibilities Round Table and chair, Committee on the Status of Women in Librarianship; labored tirelessly and effectively for the Equal Rights Amendment, comparable worth, leadership development for women, and childcare.
1989	Sanford Berman	Everything You Always Wanted to Know About Sandy Berman but Were Afraid to Ask.
1988	Kathleen Weibel	ALA Task Force on Women-Pre-Conference, 1974. Author: “Toward a Feminist Profession,”The Role of Women in Librarianship 1876-1976: The Entry, Advancement and Struggle for Equalization in One Profession, “Public Library Response to Women and Their Changing Roles.”
1987	Kathleen M. Heim	Illinois Library Association ERA Task Force, Committee of the Status of Women in Librarianship, Co-author,The Role of Women in Librarianship 1876-1976: The Entry, Advancement and Struggle for Equalization in One Profession.
1986	Kay A. Cassell“	Author, “ALA and the ERA.” “Public Library Response to Women and Their Changing Roles,”Association of College and Research Libraries Women and Gender Studies Section Career Achievement Award.
1985	Anita R. Schiller	American Library Association Honorary Member. First researcher to document pervasive pattern of gender inequality within the library profession (1968) - “Characteristics of Professional Personnel in College and University Libraries." Committee on the Status of Women in Librarianship, Task Force on Better Salaries and Pay Equity for Library Workers.
1984	Margaret Myers	Director, American Library Association, Office for Library Personnel Resources, 1974–1995. Formulated "Each One, Reach One" campaign, 1988 to increase diversity in librarianship; did foundational work that gathered data for the SPECTRUM scholarship program.Melvil’s Rib Symposium

== See also ==
American librarianship and human rights
Diversity in librarianship
