= Person of color =

Term for a person considered non-white

Person of color (pl.: people of color or persons of color; abbreviated POC) is a term used to describe any person who is not considered "white". In its contemporary meaning, the term originated in, and is associated with, the United States. From the 2010s, however, it has been adopted in a limited fashion elsewhere in the Anglosphere (often as person of colour), including relatively limited usage in the United Kingdom, Canada, Australia, Ireland, and South Africa. Critics of the term have objected to the term's implication that whiteness is a default condition, and to its aggregation of diverse communities into a single phrase. These critics find the term to be inaccurate, misleading, and in some cases, offensive.

In the United States, the term is involved in the various definitions of non-whiteness, including African Americans, Asian Americans, Native Americans, Pacific Islander Americans, multiracial Americans, and some Latino Americans, though members of these communities may prefer to view themselves through their cultural identities rather than color-related terminology. The term, as used in the United States, emphasizes common experiences of systemic racism, which some communities have faced. The term may also be used with other collective categories of people such as "communities of color", "men of color" (MOC), "women of color" (WOC), or "librarians of color". The acronym "BIPOC" refers to "black, indigenous, and other people of color" and aims to emphasize the historic oppression of black and indigenous people. The term "colored" was originally equivalent in use to the term "person of color" in American English, but usage of the appellation "colored" in the Southern United States gradually came to be restricted to "Negroes", and it is now considered a racial pejorative. Elsewhere in the world, and in other dialects of English, the term may have entirely different connotations, however; for example, in South Africa, "Coloureds" refers to multiple multiracial ethnic groups and is sometimes applied to other groups in Southern Africa, such as the Basters of Namibia.

== History ==
The American Heritage Guide to Contemporary Usage and Style cites usage of "people of colour" as far back as 1796. It was initially used to refer to light-skinned people of mixed African and European heritage. French colonists used the term gens de couleur ("people of color") to refer to people of mixed African and European ancestry in the Americas who were not enslaved. In South Carolina and other parts of the Deep South, this term was used to distinguish between slaves who were mostly "black" or "Negro" and free people who were primarily "mulatto" or "mixed race". After the American Civil War, "colored" was used as a label almost exclusively for black Americans, but the term eventually fell out of favor by the mid-20th century.

Although American activist Martin Luther King Jr. used the term "citizens of color" in 1963, the phrase did not catch on until the late 1970s. In the late 20th century, the term "person of color" was introduced in the United States in order to counter the condescension implied by the terms "non-white" and "minority", and racial-justice activists in the U.S., influenced by radical theorists such as Frantz Fanon, popularized it at this time. By the late 1980s and early 1990s, it was in wide circulation. Both anti-racist activists and academics sought to move the understanding of race beyond the black–white dichotomy then prevalent.

The phrase "women of color" was developed and introduced for wide use by a group of black women activists at the National Women's Conference in 1977. The phrase was used as a method of communicating solidarity between non-white women that was, according to Loretta Ross, not based on "biological destiny" but instead a political act of naming themselves.

In the 21st century, use of the term and the categorization continued to proliferate: For example, the Joint Council of Librarians of Color (JCLC), a recurring conference of the American Library Association, which uses the "of color" designation for its five ethnic affiliate associations. They include: the Black Caucus of the American Library Association, the American Indian Library Association, the Asian Pacific American Librarians Association, the Chinese American Librarians Association, and REFORMA: The National Association to Promote Library & Information Services to Latinos and the Spanish Speaking.

== Political significance ==
According to Stephen Satris of Clemson University, there are two main racial divides in the United States. The first is the "black–white" delineation; the second racial delineation is the one "between whites and everyone else", with whites being "narrowly construed" and everyone else being called "people of color". Because the term "people of color" includes vastly different people with only the common distinction of not being white, it draws attention to the perceived fundamental role of racialization in the United States. Joseph Tuman of San Francisco State University argues that the term "people of color" is attractive because it unites disparate racial and ethnic groups into a larger collective in solidarity with one another.

Use of the term "person of color", especially in the United States, is often associated with the social-justice movement. Style guides from the American Heritage Guide to Contemporary Usage and Style, the Stanford Graduate School of Business, and Mount Holyoke College all recommend the term "person of color" over other alternatives. Unlike "colored", which historically referred primarily to black people and is often considered offensive, "person of color" and its variants refer inclusively to all non-European peoples—often with the notion that there is political solidarity among them—and, according to one style guide, "are virtually always considered terms of pride and respect".

== Criticism ==
Many critics of the term, both white and non-white, object to its lack of specificity and find the phrase racially offensive. It has been argued that the term lessens the focus on individual issues facing different racial and ethnic groups, particularly African Americans whom Michael Holzman argues ignores the specific legacy of historical disadvantage in the United States. Preserving "whiteness" as an intact category while lumping every other racial group into an indiscriminate category ("of color") replicates the marginalization that the term was intended to counter. Other commentators state that the term "people of color" is a misnomer and an arbitrary term in which people who are white are mislabeled as people of color. People of color also encompasses various heterogeneous groups that have little in common, with some arguing that American culture as a whole does not deliberate on economic inequality or issues of class.

Political scientist Angelo Falcón argues that the use of broad terms like "person of color" is offensive because it aggregates diverse communities and projects "a false unity" that "obscure[s] the needs of Latinos and Asians". Citing the sensitivity of the issue, Falcón suggested that there should be "a national summit of Black, Latino and Asian community leaders" to discuss "how can the problem of the so-called 'black/white binary' be tackled in the way it respects the diversity it ignores and helps build the broader constituency for racial social justice that is needed in the country" and to "open the way for a perhaps much-needed resetting of relations between these historically-discriminated against communities that can lead to a more useful etymology of this relationship".

Blogger Daniel Lim criticizes the term for centering whiteness, framing non-white identities in relation to it and implying that whiteness is the default, race-neutral category. This positioning suggests that race is only relevant for non-white people, thus reinforcing the idea that whiteness is the norm and other identities are deviations. Critics argue that this dynamic marginalizes non-white groups even as the term seeks to unite them, and some individuals express discomfort with having their identities defined in relation to whiteness rather than independently.

Comedian George Carlin described "people of color" as "an awkward, bullshit, liberal-guilt phrase that obscures meaning rather than enhancing it", adding, "What should we call white people? 'People of no color'?"

The use of the phrase person of color to describe white Hispanic and Latino Americans and Spaniards has been criticized as inaccurate. The United States census denotes the term "Latino" as a pan-ethnic label, rather than a racial category. Although many Latinos may qualify as being "people of color", the indiscriminate labeling of all Latinos as "people of color" obscures the racial diversity that exists within the Latino population itself, and, for this reason, some commentators have found the term misleading.

=== BIPOC ===
The acronym BIPOC, referring to "black, indigenous, (and) people of color", first appeared around 2013. By June 2020, it was, according to Sandra Garcia of The New York Times, "ubiquitous in some corners of Twitter and Instagram", as racial justice awareness grew in the United States in the wake of the murder of George Floyd. The term aims to emphasize the historic oppression of black and indigenous people, which is argued to be superlative and distinctive in U.S. history at the collective level. The BIPOC Project promotes the term in order to "highlight the unique relationship to Whiteness that Indigenous and Black (African Americans) people have, which shapes the experiences of and relationship to white supremacy for all people of color within a U.S. context".

The term BIPOC does not appear to have originated in the black and Indigenous American communities, as it had been adopted much more widely among white Democrats than among people of color in a 2021 national poll. Asian and Latino Americans have often been confused as to whether the term includes them. The centering of black and Indigenous people in the acronym has been criticized as an unnecessary, unfounded, and divisive ranking of the oppression faced by the communities of color. The acronym's purposeful and definitional assertion that the historical and present-day suffering experienced by black and Indigenous people is more significant in kind or degree than that of other non-white groups has been described as casting communities of color in an oppression Olympics that obscures intersectional characteristics, similarities, and opportunities for solidarity in the struggle against racism. Critics argue that the systems of oppression foundational to U.S. history were not limited to the slavery and genocide suffered by black and Indigenous Americans, but also included the Asian-American and Latino-American experiences of oppression under the Chinese Exclusion Act and the doctrine of manifest destiny. Noting that "Black and Indigenous people are not at the center of every contemporary racial issue", other commentators have found it problematic that the ascendancy of the term coincided with the pronounced rise in anti-Asian hate crimes during the COVID-19 pandemic. By rendering Asian Americans as an unnamed "remnant", critics argue that the acronym renders the racial discrimination they experience invisible, thereby perpetuating harmful model minority and perpetual foreigner stereotypes. Some critics advocate a return to "POC" for its emphasis on coalition-building, while others call for a contextual approach that names "the groups actually included and centered in the arguments themselves". The term has also been criticized for being redundant.

== See also ==
- Free people of color
- Anglo-Indian
- Black, Asian and minority ethnic
- Colorism
- Coloureds
- Discrimination based on skin color
- Global majority
- Identity politics
- Model minority
- Oppression Olympics
- Perpetual foreigner
- Political blackness
- Political correctness
- Race
- Race and ethnicity in the United States
- Racialization
- Visible minority
