= Emily Drabinski =

American librarian and educator (born 1975)

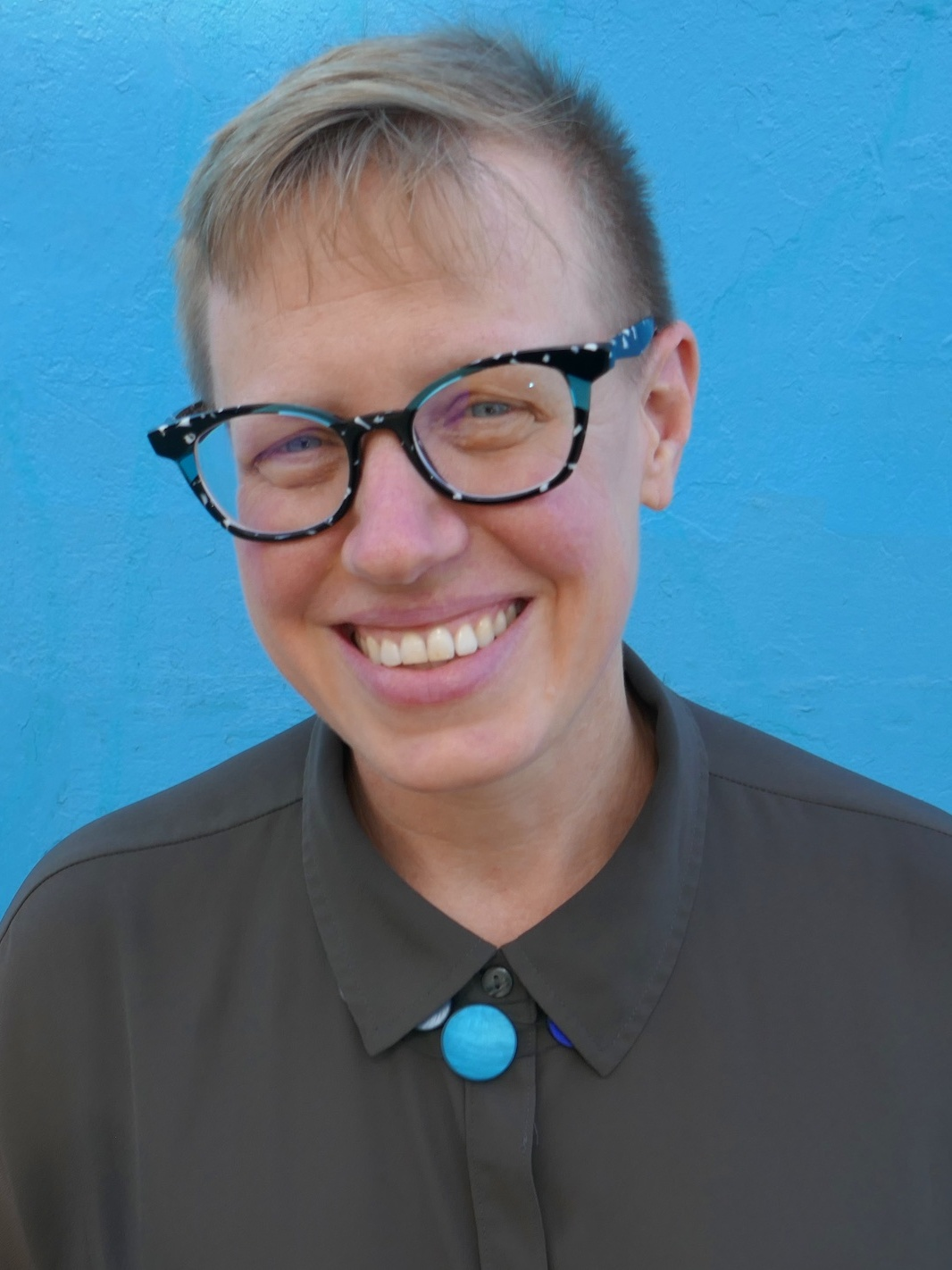
- Drabinski in 2021

President of the American Library Association
- In office July 2023 – July 2024
- Preceded by: Lessa Kananiʻopua Pelayo-Lozada
- Succeeded by: Cindy Hohl

Personal details
- Born: June 16, 1975 (age 51) Boise, Idaho, U.S.
- Education: Columbia University; Syracuse University; Long Island University
- Occupation: librarian, teacher, academic

Emily Drabinski (born June 16, 1975) is an American academic, librarian, author, and teacher who served as president of the American Library Association from July 2023 to July 2024.

== Early life and education ==
Drabinski was born in June 1975 in Boise, Idaho, with an identical twin sister, Kate Drabinski. She attended Madison Elementary School, North Junior High School, and Boise High School while living in Idaho. Drabinski earned her Bachelor of Arts in political science in 1997 from Columbia University.

In 2001, she enrolled in Syracuse University's Master of Library and Information Science program. At the time, she lived in New York City, took classes online, and worked full-time at the New York Public Library. She received her MLIS degree in 2003 from Syracuse. She earned a degree in rhetoric and composition in 2011 from Long Island University to become an academic librarian.

== Career ==
Drabinski's first professional librarian job was as an academic reference librarian from 2004 to 2008 at Sarah Lawrence College. Drabinski was an early member of Radical Reference, where she protested the 2004 Republican National Convention in New York City and taught fact-checking workshops for independent journalists. She remained a member and participated in events between 2007 and 2010.

From 2008 to 2012, Drabinski served as an electronic resources and instruction librarian at Long Island University Brooklyn. She also served there from 2012 to 2019 as a coordinator of library instruction. As a faculty librarian at LIU Brooklyn, Drabinski went on strike in 2011 with fellow union members.

In 2016, Drabinski co-chaired a colloquium on gender and sexuality in information studies with Baharak Yousefi and Tara Robertson. Drabinski edited a Library Juice Press series on gender and sexuality in information studies. She also co-edited Critical Library Instruction: Theories & Methods with Maria T. Accardi and Alana Kumbier.

In September 2016, Drabinski was secretary of LIU's faculty federation and joined the faculty and students' protest at Long Island University Brooklyn over a lockout associated with faculty contract negotiations. In an interview with Jacobin, Drabinski described the union as "fairly militant" in seeking a fair contract, and highlighted the union's desire for the university to move "towards meaningful shared governance." In April 2022, she stated the lockout informed her about "forming collective power" among workers. From 2017 to 2020, Drabinski taught classes at Syracuse University in its MSLIS program.

Drabinski joined the faculty in 2019 at the CUNY Graduate Center as a critical pedagogy librarian. In March 2020, just as the COVID-19 lockdown began in New York City, Drabinski assumed the role of interim chief at the Graduate City library when the previous chief Polly Thistlethwait, became interim university dean for library services at CUNY. Drabinski also held a workshop in March 2019 at the Open Educational Resources bootcamp of CUNY. In July 2022, she ended her role as interim chief librarian but continued to work at CUNY's Mina Rees Library.

In October 2021, the American Library Association announced Drabinski's candidacy for the office of president for the 2023-24 term. She had previously served as an American Library Association councillor-at-large (2017-2020), a chair of the International Relations Committee, a board member of the Association of College and Research Libraries, and Information Literacy Frameworks and Standards Committee member. As president of the ALA, Drabinski pledged to build solidarity to "champion a treasured social institution" in librarianship, create "stronger connections between...our communities and the communities we serve," and aid everyone in society struggling from "maldistribution of wealth." She also argued that the ALA needed a president who publicly sided with labour and educated people about union organizing.

On April 13, 2022, the ALA announced Drabinski won the election as president, receiving 5,410 votes versus 4,622 votes for Kelvin Watson, the executive director of the Las Vegas-Clark County Library District. In November 2022, she was interviewed by Brooke Gladstone for On the Media about how libraries are under attack. Drabinski began her tenure as president in July 2023.

In the fall of 2023 she was appointed associate professor at the Queens College Graduate School of Library and Information Studies.

=== ALA Presidency ===
In her first editorial for American Libraries after becoming president, Drabinski stated, "These coming months will ask even more of us as we organize and mobilize together on behalf of our libraries, our patrons, our communities, and, importantly, ourselves." She asserted that the ALA needs to make "good trouble, the kind of trouble that matters," adding that the ALA must "build the collective power necessary to preserve and expand the public good," and committed herself to working with everyone.

In her first interview as ALA president on August 7, Drabinski said she plans to tackle "pressing issues" facing librarians, including preparing libraries for climate change consequences, ensuring collections are diverse, hiring lawyers for libraries, encouraging people who support intellectual freedom to run for library and school boards, and hosting an intellectual freedom summit in Washington, D.C. in January 2024.

After her election as ALA president in June 2022, Drabinski described herself in a later deleted tweet as a "Marxist lesbian" who believes in "collective power." Following the tweet, Tiffany Justice, co-founder of the conservative nonprofit Moms for Liberty, criticized supposed outside interference in libraries. Drabinski stated that she wants to promote and build enthusiasm for librarians' work across the United States.

In July 2023, the Montana State Library Commission voted 5-1-1 to withdraw from the ALA because of Drabinski's political beliefs. The ALA later stated that the organization would continue to provide "essential support, resources, and opportunities for every library and library worker" in all states and territories despite the decision. Prior to the decision, Darrell Ehrlick of The Daily Montanan criticized the Montana Commission for legitimizing stereotypes about lesbians and Marxists. The executive board of the Montana Library Association said that they "deeply regretted" the Commission's decision, that it runs counter to the mission of the Commission, and that it "undermines the shared goals of Montana libraries." Branko Marcetic later argued in Jacobin that such votes and related efforts from nine Republican Freedom Caucuses across the U.S. to also withdraw from the ALA were examples of red-baiting and homophobic attacks against Drabinski.

In an August 2023 interview, Drabinski stated that her tweet was an excited expression and celebration of two aspects of her identity which are important to her and often scrutinized. She said that she didn't anticipate what she described as "targeted attacks being used as a bludgeon against library workers," calling these "regrettable." She added that critiques of her beliefs are "organized pro-censorship efforts" by those who want to weaken support for "public institutions that enable access to information for everyone" and said that though her personal views are being targeted, her "personal agenda doesn’t drive the association" and that the driving force of its organizational agenda is helping everyone work together.

In November 2023, Drabinski told Out that her election as an "openly LGBTQ+ person" makes her "incredibly proud of [her] community." She added that knowing members of the ALA elected her to lead in "these difficult circumstances means that all of us have won."

=== Research, teaching, and librarianship ===
Drabinski's research focuses on queer theory, library instruction, and cataloging practice. She has also conducted research about reference services for incarcerated persons with scholar Deborah Rabina. Drabinski says that current library classification has "no language" for queer people because "queer identity terms change so quickly." Those classifications require "fixed language...[and] there’s no way to change it quickly."

Drabinski is on the editorial board of Radical Teacher. She works as an adjunct professor at UCLA and Rutgers University. She was formerly a part-time faculty member at the Pratt School of Information, where she taught a reference librarianship course.

== Personal life ==
In June 2020, during the COVID-19 lockdowns, Drabinski and her partner, Karen Miller, a history professor at LaGuardia Community College and the CUNY Graduate Center, launched Homeschool Co-op 2020. That effort invited people to teach classes over Zoom for children and adults. Drabinski led a morning session, Cat Chat, at 8 a.m. Eastern Time every day.

Drabinski and Miller live in Brooklyn with their son and three cats.

== Honors and awards ==
- 2014. Library Journal Mover & Shaker Advocate.
- 2015. Ilene F. Rockman Instruction Publication of the Year from the Association of College and Research Libraries Instruction Section for the article "Towards a Kairos of Library Instruction".
- 2018. Beta Phi Mu Harold Lancour Scholarship for Foreign Study in 2018.
- 2024. Torchbearer Award from Publishing Triangle.
- 2024. Dalhousie-Horrocks National Leadership Lecture. "Collective Power, Public Good: Library Leadership for Everyone".

== Selected publications ==
- Drabinski, Emily (2023). "The Fight for Libraries: Libraries and higher education face a shared battle." AAUP. (Spring 2023).
- Drabinski, Emily (September 29, 2022). "Disinvestment Poses as Great a Threat to Libraries as Book Bans". Truthout. Archived from the original on January 11, 2023.
- Drabinski, Emily (December 16, 2022). "Facing Threat of Far Right Violence, Library Workers Seek Safety in Unionization". Truthout. Archived from the original on December 29, 2022.
- Drabinski, Emily (December 26, 2022). "Louisiana Communities Organize to Defend Libraries From Far Right Censorship". Truthout. Archived from the original on January 4, 2023.
- Drabinski, Emily. (2020) “Professionalism reconsidered.” Evidence-Based Library and Information Practice. 15, No. 20, 191-195.
- Drabinski, Emily (December 19, 2019). "The Revolution Won't Be Live Tweeted: On Jen Schradie's "The Revolution That Wasn't: How Digital Activism Favors Conservatives"". Los Angeles Review of Books. Archived from the original on January 25, 2022.
- Drabinski, Emily (February 13, 2018). "Ideologies of Boring Things: The Internet and Infrastructures of Race". Los Angeles Review of Books. Archived from the original on December 8, 2021.
- Drabinski, Emily (May 14, 2017). "A Space for Pleasures of All Kinds: On "Cruising the Library"". Los Angeles Review of Books. Archived from the original on December 3, 2021.
- Drabinski, Emily and Debbie Rabina. (2016) "Reference Services to Incarcerated People, Part II: Sources and Learning Outcomes." Reference & User Services Quarterly, 55, No. (3), pp. 123–131.
- Drabinski, Emily and Debbie Rabina. (2016)"Reference Services to Incarcerated People, Part I: Themes Emerging from Answering Reference Questions from Prisons and Jails." Reference & User Services Quarterly, 55, No.(1), pp. 42–48.
- Drabinski, Emily (September 2014). "Towards a Kairos of Library Instruction". The Journal of Academic Librarianship. 40 (5): 480–485. doi:10.1016/j.acalib.2014.06.002.
- Billey, Amber; Drabinski, Emily; Roberto, K. R. (April 2014). "What's Gender Got to Do with It? A Critique of RDA 9.7". Cataloging & Classification Quarterly. 52 (4): 412–421. doi:10.1080/01639374.2014.882465. S2CID 62226099.
- Drabinski, Emily (April 2013). "Queering the Catalog: Queer Theory and the Politics of Correction". The Library Quarterly. 83 (2): 94–111. doi:10.1086/669547. JSTOR 10.1086/669547. S2CID 54961169.
