= Lessa Kananiʻopua Pelayo-Lozada =

American librarian

President of the American Library Association
- In office 2022–2023
- Preceded by: Patty Wong
- Succeeded by: Emily Drabinski

Personal details
- Born: California, United States
- Occupation: Librarian

Lessa Kananiʻopua Pelayo-Lozada is an American librarian. She is the current Director for the Glendale Public Library in Southern California. In 2021, Pelayo-Lozada was elected as president of the American Library Association for the 2022–2023 term; she is the youngest person to be elected ALA president as well as the first Pacific Islander.

== Early life and education ==
Lessa Kananiʻopua Pelayo was born in Southern California. She is multiracial, describing her heritage as "half white and half Hawaiian-Filipino-Portuguese-with a smidge of Chinese." Pelayo-Lozada has described her background as a multiracial Native Hawaiian raised on the Continent as being influential in her work in diversity, equity, and inclusion.

She grew up in Torrance and Gardena, graduating from Bishop Montgomery High School in 2003.

Pelayo-Lozada attended El Camino College, receiving an associate degree in philosophy in 2005. She went on to earn two degrees from the University of California, Los Angeles: a bachelor's degree in sociology in 2007 and a Master of Library and Information Science in 2009. She wrote her master's thesis describing how cultural information is retained and disseminated among those in the Native Hawaiian diaspora in Southern California.

== Career in librarianship ==
Pelayo-Lozada has worked in multiple public libraries in the Los Angeles area, beginning as a library aide for the Los Angeles Public Library from 2006 to 2010. From 2009 to 2015, she worked as a youth librarian at Redondo Beach Public Library, the Glendale Public Library, and the library of the city of Rancho Cucamonga. She joined the Palos Verdes Library District in 2016 as a youth services librarian. In 2018 Pelayo-Lozada became the library district's adult services assistant manager.

== Service to librarianship ==
Pelayo-Lozada has held multiple leadership roles within the American Library Association (ALA), including chairing the Advisory Committee for ALA's Office for Diversity, Literacy, and Outreach Services from 2016 to 2017. She has served on the ALA Council for several terms, as well as a term on the ALA Executive Board from 2017 to 2020.

In April 2021, Pelayo-Lozada was elected as president of ALA for 2022–2023. After winning, she released a statement discussing her intention to work to make ALA a more inclusive and antiracist organization as well as "a model of organizational excellence and sustainability." She is the first Pacific Islander and the youngest person to be elected president of ALA.

From 2016 to 2017, she was the president of the Asian Pacific American Librarians Association, later going on to become the organization's Executive Director. She also helped establish "Talk Story: Sharing Stories, Sharing Culture," a literacy program specifically designed for Asian Pacific American and American Indian/Alaska Native children.
