= Nicole A. Cooke =

African-American librarian and educator

- Education: Rutgers University (M.L.S., Ph.D.) Pennsylvania State University (M.Ed.)
- Occupations: Librarian and educator
- Employer: University of South Carolina
- Website: http://www.nicolecooke.info/

Nicole Amy Cooke is an African-American librarian and the Augusta Baker Endowed Chair at the University of South Carolina. Her research focus on critical cultural information studies in libraries and her advocacy for social justice have earned recognition in the library profession.

== Biography and education ==
Cooke attended Rutgers University for her bachelor's degree in communication in 1997. She continued at Rutgers for her Master of Library Science in 1999, and a Ph.D. from the School of Communication and Information in 2012.

Cooke was a librarian for 13 years before pursuing her Ph.D. She was part of the first cohort of the American Library Association Spectrum doctoral fellows during her program at Rutgers. Cooke earned a M.Ed. from Pennsylvania State University.

== Research and career ==
Cooke's research interests include human information behavior, critical cultural information studies, and diversity and social justice in librarianship.

Her early service work focused on increasing the number of librarians of color in the profession in order to make libraries and librarians more reflective of the communities they serve. Cooke felt it would be "tantamount to malpractice" to send library students into the workforce without educating them about social justice issues.

She has published about the struggles she and other librarians of color face in predominately white spaces like academia.

In 2010, Cooke and Trevor Dawes founded the New Jersey chapter of the Black Caucus of the American Library Association.

Cooke began teaching at the University of Illinois Urbana-Champaign in 2013. Her class, Information Services to Diverse Populations, addressed a gap in the curriculum to meet the needs of the student body. This inspired her book, Information Services to Diverse Populations: Developing Culturally Competent Library Professionals. By 2018, Cooke was the program director for the Master's of Library and Information Science Program.

In 2017, Cooke received a Diversity Research Grant from the American Library Association, Office for Diversity, Literacy, and Outreach Services. Right wing outlet Campus Reform published a story about her project, called "Minority Student Experiences with Racial Microaggressions in the Academic Library," and Cooke received harassment as a result of their publication. Hate groups published her email address and phone number on their websites. Her workplace and campus safety did not remove her email address or phone number from the website, and investigated her instead.

In 2019, Cooke was awarded the Augusta Baker Chair in Childhood Literacy in the School of Information Science at the University of South Carolina. As of 2022, she is an associate professor in the program.

She was the Chair of Public and Cultural Programs Advisory Committee under ALA President Julius C. Jefferson Jr., and was a member of the Overall Advisory Committee for ALA President Patty Wong (librarian).

In 2020, Cooke created the Anti-Racism Resources for All Ages project.

In 2023 Nicole A. Cooke was appointed co-editor of the journal, Libraries: Culture, History, and Society, published by the Library History Round Table of the American Library Association.

== Selected publications ==
- Cooke, Nicole A., The Legacy of Black Women in Librarianship: When They Dared to Be Powerful. ALA Neal-Schuman, 2025.
- Cooke, N. A. (2022). Foundations of Social Justice. S.l.: ALA Neal-Schuman.
- Cooke, N. A. (2018). Fake news and alternative facts: Information literacy in a post-truth era.
- Cooke, N. A., & Jacobs, J. A. (2018). Diversity and Cultural Competence in the LIS Classroom: A Curriculum Audit. Urban Library Journal, 24 (1).
- Cooke, N. A., & Sweeney, M. E. (2017). Teaching for justice: Implementing social justice in the LIS classroom.
- Reading Is Only a Step on the Path to Anti-Racism
- Cooke, N. A. (2017). Post truth, truthiness, and alternative facts: Information behavior and critical information consumption for a new age. The Library Quarterly. 87(3), 211–221.
- Gibson, A. N., Chancellor, R. L., Cooke, N. A., Dahlen, S. P., Lee, S. A., & Shorish, Y. L. (2017). "Libraries on the frontlines: Neutrality and social justice." Equality, Diversity and Inclusion: An International Journal.
- Cooke, N. A. (2016). Information Services to Diverse Populations: Developing Culturally Competent Library Professionals.
- Cooke, N. A., Sweeney, M. E., & Noble, S. U. (2016). Social justice as topic and tool: An attempt to transform an LIS curriculum and culture. The Library Quarterly, 86(1), 107–124.
- Cooke, N. A. (2010). Becoming an andragogical librarian: Using library instruction as a tool to combat library anxiety and empower adult learners. New Review of Academic Librarianship, 16(2), 208–227.

== Honors and recognition ==
- 2007. “Mover & Shaker” by Library Journal
- 2013. ALISE Norman Horrocks Leadership Award.
- 2015 University of Illinois YWCA's Leadership Award in Education
- 2016 University of Illinois Larine Y. Cowan Make a Difference Award for Teaching and Mentoring in Diversity.
- 2016. American Library Association Equality Award.
- 2017 Achievement in Library Diversity Research Award presented by American Library Association Office for Diversity, Literacy & Outreach
- 2019 Augusta Baker Endowment Chair
- 2019 ALISE excellence in teaching award
- 2021 Social Justice Award from the University of South Carolina
- 2024.Joseph W. Lippincott Award, American Library Association.
- 2025. Jean E. Coleman Library Outreach Lecture , American Library Association.

== See also ==
- American librarianship and human rights
- Augusta Braxton Baker
- Black Caucus of the American Library Association
