= Janice Gould =

American poet

Janice M. Gould
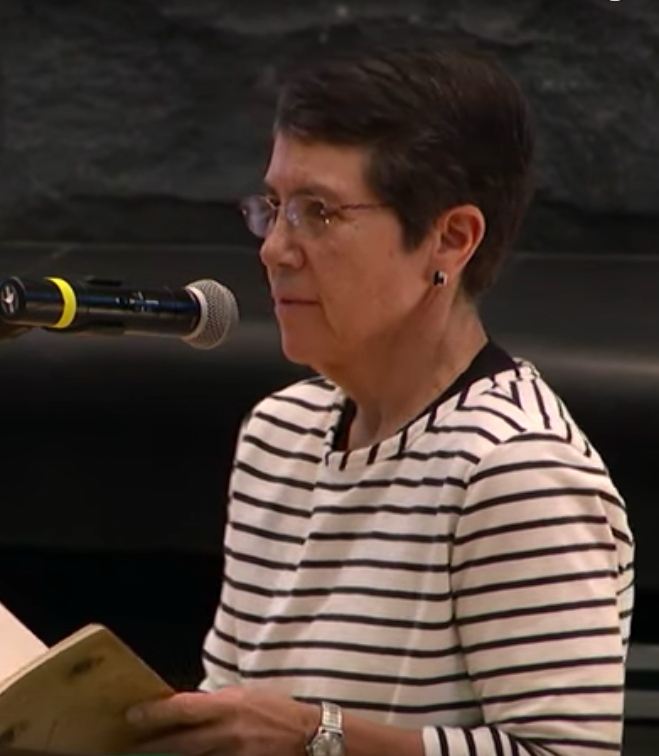
- Born: April 1, 1949; San Diego, California
- Died: June 28, 2019 (aged 69–70); Colorado Springs, Colorado
- Citizenship: American
- Education: University of California, Berkeley, B.A. in linguistics, M.A. in English; University of New Mexico, Ph.D.; University of Arizona, MA in Library Science, University of Arizona
- Occupations: Writer, poet, scholar, musician
- Employer: University of Colorado at Colorado Springs
- Notable work: Beneath My Heart, Earthquake Weather, Doubters and Dreamers, Seed, The Force of Gratitude
- Partner: Marie-Elise Wheatwind

Janice Gould (1949–2019) was a Koyangk'auwi (Konkow, Concow) Maidu writer and scholar. She was the author of Beneath My Heart, Earthquake Weather and co-editor with Dean Rader of Speak to Me Words: Essays on Contemporary American Indian Poetry. Her book Doubters and Dreamers (2011) was a finalist for the Colorado Book Award and the Binghamton University Milt Kessler Poetry Book Award.

Gould's poetic efforts were recognized by the Astraea Lesbian Foundation for Justice in 1992.

== Biography ==
Gould was born on April 1, 1949, in San Diego, California, and grew up in Berkeley. She graduated magna cum laude from the University of California, Berkeley, earning degrees in linguistics (B.A) and English (M.A.). She also earned a master's degree in Library Science (M.A) from the University of Arizona. She completed a certificate in Museum Studies. Her Ph.D. (English) was completed at the University of New Mexico. She was the Hallie Ford Chair in Creative Writing at Willamette University. In 2012 Gould completed a residency for Indigenous Writers at the School for Advanced Research in Santa Fe, New Mexico. She was also a musician who played guitar and accordion. Her lesbian identity has been a prominent theme of her work.

== Career ==
Gould taught at over 13 colleges and universities in the fields of English, Creative Writing, Native American Studies and Women's Studies, and served as the Hallie Ford Chair of Creative Writing at Willamette University. At the time of her death, she was an associate professor in Women's and Ethnic Studies, and Native American Studies at the University of Colorado at Colorado Springs. From 2014 to 2016, Gould served as the Poet Laureate of Pike's Peak. She published 8 books. These books range from collections of her own poetry, chapbooks, art books and anthologies of essays. Her poetry has been published in over 60 journals, reviews and anthologies. Gould was the recipient of many awards for her literary achievements, including the Ford Dissertation Fellowship, the Astraea Foundation Grant, a "Spirit of the Springs" Award from the City of Colorado Springs, and from Native Literatures: Generations.

== Themes ==
Gould's work contains themes of “love, loneliness, longing for connection, family, history, place, and music”. The term "Indigenous Assemblage" has been used about her work, to describe links across race, sex, gender, and geography. According to Shanna Lewis, Gould's The Force of Gratitude features the resurgence of traditional Indigenous identity to explain that her father was Two Spirited.

== Selected bibliography ==
=== Select articles ===
- American Indian Women's Poetry: Strategies of Rage and Hope
- What Happened to My Anger?
- Lesbian Landscape

=== Selected books ===
- Seed (2019)
- The Force of Gratitude (2017)
- Doubters and Dreamers (2011)
- Speak to Me Words: Essays on Contemporary Indigenous Poetry (2003, editor with Dean Rader)
- Earthquake Weather (1996)
- Beneath My Heart (1990)
- Alphabet (1996)

== Grants and scholarhips ==
Janice Gould is recognized for her poetry and scholarship and therefore has a long list of awards. A few of her most significant accomplishments are as follows:

- Native Writer-in-Residence, School for Advanced Research, Santa Fe, Winter 2012.
- Native Literature Generations Award, 2011.
- Association of Research Libraries Diversity Scholars Fellowship, 2007.
- Knowledge River Scholar, University of Arizona, 2006–2008.
- National Museum of the American Indian Internship, 2007.
- Ford Foundation Dissertation Fellowship, 1994–95.
- ASTREA Foundation Award for poetry, 1992.
- National Endowment for the Arts (NEA) literary fellowship, 1989.
