= List of public libraries in Los Angeles County, California =

This is a list of public libraries in Los Angeles County, California:

- County of Los Angeles Public Library - 7.8 million items
- Los Angeles Public Library - 6.3 million items
- Alhambra Civic Center Library
- Altadena Library District
- Arcadia Public Library
- Azusa City Library
- Beverly Hills Public Library
- Burbank Public Library
- Calabasas Public Library
- Cerritos Millennium Library
- Covina Public Library
- Crowell Public Library, San Marino
- Downey City Library
- El Segundo Public Library
- Glendale Public Library
- Glendora Library
- Hacienda Heights Library
- Inglewood Public Library
- Katy Geissert Civic Center Library, Torrance
- Long Beach Public Library
- Monterey Park Bruggemeyer Library
- Monrovia Public Library
- Palos Verdes Library District
- Pasadena Public Library
- Pomona Public Library
- Redondo Beach Public Library
- San Marino Public Library
- Santa Clarita Public Library
- Santa Monica Public Library
- Sierra Madre Public Library
- South Pasadena Public Library
- Whittier Public Library

== See also ==
- List of the largest libraries in the United States
- List of libraries in the United States
- Los Angeles County
- Books in the United States
