= Maria T. Accardi =

American academic

Maria T. Accardi is an academic in the field of library science at Indiana University Southeast.

She is the 2014 recipient of the Association of College and Research Libraries (ACRL) Award for Significant Achievement in Woman's Studies Librarianship for her book Feminist Pedagogy for Library Instruction. Published in 2013 by Library Juice Press, the work examines "the intersection of information literacy and feminist theory." The chair of the awarding committee, Jennifer Mayer of the University of Wyoming, hailed the book as a "must-read for any librarian with interests in feminist issues, pedagogy, and library instruction."

Accardi is also a co-editor of Critical Library Instruction: Theories and Methods along with Emily Drabinski and Alana Kumbier. She is a graduate of the University of Pittsburgh, University of Louisville, and Northern Kentucky University.

== Books ==
- Critical library instruction : theories and methods. Maria T Accardi, Emily Drabinski and Alana Kumbier, 2010. ISBN 1936117401
- Feminist pedagogy for library instruction. Maria T Accardi, 2013. ISBN 193611755X
