= Doris Seale =

American poet (1936–2017)

- Born: Doris Marion Cota; July 10, 1936; Brattleboro, Vermont, United States of America
- Died: February 10, 2017 (aged 80); Burlington, Vermont, United States of America
- Occupations: Librarian, poet

Doris Seale (born Doris Marion Cota; July 10, 1936 – February 17, 2017) was an American librarian, poet, writer, and educator. She worked as a librarian in Brookline, Massachusetts for 45 years. She was a co-founder of Oyate, an advocacy and education organization which reviews children's literature to ensure it treats Native Americans with "historical accuracy, cultural appropriateness and without anti-Indian bias and stereotypes".

She wrote poetry and non-fiction that focused on these themes. Her last published work, A Broken Flute: The Native Experience in Books for Children, dealt with issues of cultural appropriation. It included a chapter on deconstructing the myths perpetuated about the first Thanksgiving, helping educators create more culturally appropriate activities for the holiday. Her activism extended into other areas of her work. When she received the ALA Equity Award in 2001, the ceremony was being held at the Marriott Hotel in San Francisco, a hotel that was in a labor dispute with its workers. Seale joined that picket line rather than go inside to accept her award.

== Awards ==
- 2001 American Library Association Equality Award
- 2006 American Book Award

== Works ==
=== Poetry ===
- Blood Salt. American Native Press Archives. 1989.
- Ghost dance: new and selected poems. Oyate. 2000. ISBN 978-0-9625175-8-7.

=== Non-fiction ===
- Caucasian Americans: Basic Skills Workbook. Berkeley, CA: Oyate. 1994.
- How to Tell the Difference: A Checklist for Evaluating Children's Books for Anti-Indian Bias. New Society Publishers. 1992. ISBN 1-55092-163-0.
- Little Whitepeople. Berkeley, CA: Oyate. 1995.
- The Multicolored Mirror: Cultural Substance in Literature for Children and Young Adults. CCBC/Highsmith Press. 1991.
- Thanksgiving : a native perspective. Berkeley, CA: Oyate. 1998.
- Through Indian eyes : the native experience in books for children. Philadelphia, Pennsylvania: New Society Publishers. 1992.

=== Editor ===
- Doris Seale; Beverly Slapin, eds. (2005). A broken flute: the Native experience in books for children. Rowman & Littlefield. ISBN 978-0-7591-0778-6.
