= Lotsee Patterson =

American librarian

Lotsee Patterson (née Smith; b. 1931) is a Comanche librarian, educator, and founder of the American Indian Library Association. She has written numerous articles on collection development, tribal libraries and Native American Librarianship. Lotsee Patterson is Native American and became interested in collecting Native American objects because her mother was a collections director. Patterson is a University of Oklahoma Professor Emeritus of Library and Information Studies.

== Early life and education ==
Patterson was born in 1931 and raised in southwestern Oklahoma, on a Native American land allotment near the town of Apache, Oklahoma. She started her professional career as a teacher at Boone School in 1959, a rural public school without a library. She taught at Riverside Indian School as well. These experiences led her to commit her professional life to determining the library needs of Native Americans and developing tribal libraries throughout the nation.

She attended the Oklahoma College for Women and earned a Bachelor of Science degree (B.S.) in 1959. She received her Masters of Library Science (MLS) from the University of Oklahoma in 1969. In 1979, she completed her Ph.D.in Educational Technology, also at the University of Oklahoma. During her graduate studies, she focused on procuring money for training librarians on how to work productively with Native American students and in selecting Native American materials of high quality.

== Career and contributions ==
After completing her MLIS, Patterson worked in libraries at Riverside Indian School (Anadarko, OK), Norman Public Schools (Norman, OK) and as Director of Library Media Services for the Oklahoma City Public Schools. She is a Professor Emeritus of Library and Information Studies at the University of Oklahoma. Prior to her position at the University of Oklahoma, she was faculty at the University of New Mexico and at Texas Woman's University.

As of 2009, Patterson was on the board for the National Medal for Museum and Library Service which advises the Institute of Museum and Library Services. As of 2015, she was on the Board of Trustees for Comanche Nation College.

In the 1970s, Patterson helped to found the Office of Library Outreach Services Subcommittee on the American Indian, now the American Indian Library Association. She wrote and received many landmark grants for projects that furthered the progress of librarianship for and in native nation lands, one of which was a training program for teacher's aides of Bureau of Indian Affairs schools to become librarians. In addition to this, by 1973 she had already established eight community libraries in the pueblos.

Patterson was Co-Chair of the Advisory Committee for the Pre-White House Conference on Library and Information Services for Native Americans. This Committee wrote the 1992 report, Pathways to Excellence: A Report on Improving Library and Information Services for Native American Peoples.

She has been involved in the development of the International Indigenous Librarians' Forum. She has also served on many committees including American Library Association's Committee on Accreditation. She has acted as a consultant in the field of library studies to many archives and museums nationwide, including as a senior advisor to the Smithsonian's National Museum of the American Indian.

Her life's work has consisted of recruiting and mentoring Native Americans in the field of librarianship, lobbying for funds to create and improve librarianship for native schools and educating students about librarianship.

== Selected works ==
- Smith, Lotsee (1974). Narrative Evaluation Report on the Institute for: Training Library Aides in Pueblo Indian Schools
- Smith, Lotsee Patterson (1979) PhD Dissertation: A Study of Perceived Media Competencies of School Librarians in the State of New Mexico
- Heyser, Richard and Smith, Lotsee (1980). "Public Library Service to Native Americans in Canada and the Continental United States."
- Patterson, Lotsee (1986). TRAILS : Training and Assistance for Indian Library Services
- Patterson, Lotsee (1992). "Native American Library Services: Reclaiming the Past, Designing the Future."
- Patterson, Lotsee (1994). Indian Terms of the Americas.
- Patterson, Lotsee and Taylor, Rhonda Harris (1994). Directory of Native American Tribal Libraries
- Patterson, Lotsee and Taylor, Rhonda Harris (1996). "Tribally Controlled Community College Libraries: A Paradigm for Survival."
- Patterson, Lotsee and Taylor, Rhonda Harris (2000) "Getting the "Indian" Out of the Cupboard: Using Information Literacy To Promote Critical Thinking."
- Patterson, Lotsee (2000). "The Work of Tribal Libraries."
- Patterson, Lotsee (2000). "History and Status of Native Americans in Librarianship."
- Taylor, Rhonda Harris and Patterson, Lotsee (2004). "Native American Resources: A Model for Collection Development."
- Patterson, Lotsee (2005). "Reflections on a Passion."
- Contributor to Protocols for Native American Archival Materials (2007)
- Patterson, Lotsee (2008). "Exploring the World of American Indian Libraries."

== Honors and awards ==
- 1991- Award of Appreciation from the National Congress of American Indians
- 1994- American Library Association Equality Award
- 1996- United States National Commission on Libraries and Information Science Silver Award
- 1997- Distinguished Service Award from Oklahoma Library Association
- 2001- Beta Phi Mu Award for distinguished service to education for librarianship
- 2003 - American Indian Library Association Honoring Our Elders Distinguished Service Award
- 2005 - American Library Association Honorary Membership
- 2007- Lifetime Achievement Award from Association of Tribal Archives, Libraries, & Museums
