= CRAAP test =

Academic source reliability criteria

The CRAAP test is a test that evaluates the objective reliability of information sources across academic disciplines. CRAAP is an acronym for Currency, Relevance, Authority, Accuracy, and Purpose. Because a vast number of sources exist online, it can be difficult to tell if sources are trustworthy enough to use for research. The CRAAP test aims to make it easier for educators and students alike to determine if sources can be trusted. By employing the test while evaluating sources, a researcher may reduce their susceptibility to unreliable information. The CRAAP test, developed by Sarah Blakeslee and her team of librarians at California State University, Chico (CSU Chico), is used mainly by higher education librarians at universities. It is one of various approaches to source criticism.

== History ==
The test was first conceptualized by Sarah Blakeslee in the spring of 2004 while she was creating a workshop for first-year instructors. Blakeslee was frustrated that she could not remember the criteria for looking up different sources. After much thought, she came up with the acronym CRAAP. Her intent was to give students an easier way to determine which sources were credible.

A similar test that precedes CRAAP is the SAILS test: the Standardized Assessment of Information Literacy Skills, which was created in 2002 by a group of librarians at Kent State University as an assessment for students' information literacy skills. The SAILS test focuses more on the scores as a quantitative measure of how well students look up their sources. While the SAILS test is more specific in its terms of evaluation, it shares the same objectives as the CRAAP test.

== Website evaluation ==
One university has started using the CRAAP test to help teach students about online content evaluation. In a 2017 article, Cara Berg, a reference librarian and co-coordinator of user education at William Paterson University, emphasizes website evaluation as a tool for active research. At Berg's university, for example, library instruction is given to roughly 300 classes in different subjects that involve research requiring students to look up sources. Website evaluation using the CRAAP test was incorporated into the first-year seminar for students at this university to help them hone their research skills.

=== Challenges in the classroom ===
When the CRAAP test was first implemented at William Paterson University, there were some technical challenges. The workshop for website evaluation felt rushed, and in most cases, librarians could not cover all bases in a singular class session. As a consequence of rushing the website evaluation portion in lieu of time, student performance on an assessment focused on website evaluation was poor. To address these problems, they developed a "flipped" method in which students watched a video that covered two of three workshop sections on their own time, with in-class instruction limited to website evaluation yet occupying all of a class period. Student performance in assessments of their proficiency for website evaluation improved after the change to instruction.

A 2021 paper by Adeva Jane Esparrago-Kalidas noted students' difficulties during their process performing the CRAAP test. Students found it difficult to differentiate between legitimate organizations and those that mimic credibility, decreasing their ability to find the right "Authority". Students further had difficulties gauging the intention of the authors, curtailing their ability to identify "Purpose".

== Pedagogical uses ==
The CRAAP test is generally used in library instruction as part of a first-year seminar for students. Students were required to participate in this class as part of the graduation requirement at William Paterson University. Besides English, many other courses have been utilizing the CRAAP method as well, such as science and engineering classes. The test is applied the same way as in website evaluation and is used universally in all courses. Examples of universities that use the CRAAP test include Central Michigan University, Benedictine University, and the Community College of Baltimore County, among the many examples. Other schools implement the test to promote student performance in subjects that require research papers.

== Alternatives and criticisms ==
In 2004, Marc Meola's paper "Chucking the Checklist" critiqued the checklist approach to evaluating information, and librarians and educators have explored alternative approaches.

Mike Caulfield, who has criticized some uses of the CRAAP test in information literacy, has emphasized an alternative approach using step-by-step heuristics that can be summarized by the acronym SIFT: "Stop; Investigate the source; Find better coverage; Trace claims, quotes, and media to the original context".

In a 2016 Project Report, a study by the Stanford History Education Group reported that some issues were found in the habits of middle school, high school, and college students when using the CRAAP test. Results show that students when sourcing social media posts, photographs and articles rarely look deeper into their sources and did not second guess themselves with evaluating its purpose or bias. The author also quotes, "Many assume that because young people are fluent in social media they are equally savvy about what they find there. Our work shows the opposite". This could mean that the CRAAP has a flaw when it comes to evaluating their sources.

In a report from 2017, the Stanford History Education Group compared the information evaluation skills of 3 groups - PhD historians, professional fact checkers and Stanford University undergraduate students. The study found that Historians and Students more often fell victim to easily manipulated features of websites, like official looking logos and domain names. On the contrary the fact checkers arrived at more warranted conclusions in a fraction of the time. The authors note that several states have passed legislation promoting the teaching of IL, but ask, ‘What if the problem is not that we’re failing to teach media literacy, but that we’re teaching the wrong kind?’ The CRAAP Test is singled out as an example of the wrong kind of IL instruction: the checklist. The authors hold that checklists like CRAAP focus students on a website’s most easily manipulated features and also lock the student into looking only at the site they are evaluating.

In a December 2019 article, Jennifer A. Fielding raised the issue that the CRAAP method focused on "deep-dives" into websites but "in recent years the dissemination of mis- and disinformation online has become increasingly sophisticated and prolific, so restricting analysis to a single website's content without understanding how the site relates to a wider scope now has the potential to facilitate the acceptance of misinformation as fact." Fielding contrasted usage of the CRAAP method, or "vertical reading" of a website, with "lateral reading", a fact-checking method to find and compare multiple sources of information on the same topic or event.

In a 2020 working paper, Sam Wineburg, Joel Breakstone, Nadav Ziv and Mark Smith found that using the CRAAP method for information literacy education makes students "susceptible to misinformation." According to these authors, the method needs thorough adaptation to help students detect fake news and biased or satirical sources in the digital age.

In a 2021 experimental study, Adeva Jane Esparrago-Kalidas showed that while the CRAAP test meaningfully improves students’ ability to evaluate source credibility, many struggled to identify various aspects. For instance, for "Purpose," it is often difficult to distinguish between fact, opinion, and propaganda. Esparrago-Kalidas further emphasized that the test benefits a diverse groups of students by "targeting specific skills for students to improve on."
