= Michele Leber =

American journalist, book reviewer, and librarian (1938–2021)

- Born: July 30, 1938; Appleton
- Died: January 1, 2021 (aged 82); Arlington County
- Occupation: Librarian, journalist

Michele Mathews Leber (July 30, 1938 – January 1, 2021) was a journalist, book reviewer, and librarian.

== Early life ==
Michele Leber was born on July 30, 1938, in Appleton, Wisconsin. She graduated from Northwestern University.

== Career ==
Michele Leber was a journalist for The Post-Crescent. She was a librarian for Fairfax County, Virginia. She was on the book buying committee, and reviewed books for The Library Journal. She was named Library Journal reviewer of the year in 1997.

Leber received the American Library Association Equality Award in 1996. She served on the Better Salaries/Pay Equity Task Force of the American Library Association which was appointed by president, Maurice J. Freedman, in 2002-2003 to provide librarians and library workers with the information, resources, and tools to enable them to advocate and negotiate, individually or collectively, for improved compensation and pay equity.

Leber served as a leader of the National Committee on Pay Equity (NCPE) a coalition of women's and civil rights organizations; labor unions; religious, professional, legal, and educational associations, commissions on women, state and local pay equity coalitions and individuals working to eliminate sex- and race-based wage discrimination and to achieve pay equity.

In 2008, she was honored as an American Library Association-Allied Professional Association ‘ALA-APA Angel’ for supporting ALA-APA to flourish in its missions of providing certification and supporting better salaries.

== Personal life ==
She married Ted Leber. Michele Leber died on January 1, 2021, at her home in Arlington, Virginia.
