= Cephalonian method =

The Cephalonian method is a method of active learning for library orientation first made popular in the United Kingdom at Cardiff University. The name is taken from a method used for orientation of tourists at a popular resort in Cephalonia, Greece.

Introduced to a wider audience in 2004 by Linda Davies and Nigel Morgan, the method consists of giving students class cards with prepared questions they are to ask during the session for the instructor to answer. Questions are grouped into categories and colour coded to provide some structure; the order of the questions in any section is based on the order the students choose to stand up, which makes the sessions more random and reduces the repetitive nature of library orientation for both librarians and patrons. However, it may be more appropriate for first year students than more senior students.

This method can be used to reduce library anxiety.
