= Anita R. Schiller =

American librarian and advocate for women in librarianship (1926–2021)

- Born: 1926; New York City, U.S.
- Died: January 23, 2021 (aged 94); San Diego, California, U.S.
- Education: Master's degree in library science from the Pratt Institute
- Occupation: Librarian
- Employers: University of Illinois; University of California, San Diego
- Organization: American Library Association
- Known for: Research on gender inequality in librarianship; advocacy for pay equity and public access to government information
- Notable work: Characteristics of Professional Personnel in College and University Libraries (1968)
- Spouse: Herbert Schiller (m. 1946; died 2000)
- Children: 2

Anita R. Schiller (1926 – January 23, 2021) was an American librarian known for her landmark research on gender inequality within the library profession and her advocacy for pay equity for female librarians and for free public access to government information. She worked for many years as a librarian at the University of California, San Diego (UCSD). In 2007 she was awarded American Library Association Honorary Membership, the Association's highest honor.

== Early life and education ==
Schiller was born in 1926 in New York City. She earned a master's degree in library science from the Pratt Institute.

== Career ==
=== Research on gender inequality in libraries ===
In 1968, Schiller published Characteristics of Professional Personnel in College and University Libraries, a study based on a major survey of salaries at 2,000 colleges and research libraries that documented a pervasive pattern of gender discrimination. The study showed significant pay disparities between male and female librarians and galvanized a generation of women in the profession to address these inequalities. Throughout the 1970s, she continued to research and publish findings on salary disparities between men and women in the field.

=== University of California, San Diego ===
Schiller moved to San Diego in 1970 to work at the University of California, San Diego. At UCSD, she served as a reference librarian, social sciences bibliographer, and data services librarian until her retirement in 1991. Colleagues recalled her "sleuthing skills" in tracking down arcane sources and her foresight in recognizing both the potential and the dangers of computerization in libraries. She was instrumental in bringing "machine-readable data files" into the UCSD library in the early 1980s.

=== Advocacy for public information ===
Schiller was deeply concerned about the commodification of public information. In 1982, she co-wrote an article with her husband, Herbert Schiller, titled "The Privatizing of Information: Who Can Own What America Knows?" for The Nation. The article warned about the transfer of government-held information to private ownership and control and won the Gold Pen Prize from the Los Angeles Pen Center.

== ALA leadership and honors ==
Schiller was an active member of the American Library Association (ALA) throughout her career, serving on the ALA Council, the Social Responsibilities Round Table (SRRT) Feminist Task Force as a founding member, the Committee on the Status of Women in Librarianship, and the President's Task Force on Better Salaries and Pay Equity for Library Workers.

In 1985, she received the American Library Association Equality Award for her outstanding contribution to promoting equality between men and women in the library profession.

In 2007, she was elected an Honorary Member of the ALA, the association's highest honor, in recognition of her "groundbreaking efforts to enhance the status of women in librarianship."

== Personal life and death ==
Schiller met her husband, Herbert Schiller, in New York, and they married in Berlin in 1946. Herbert Schiller became a renowned sociologist and media critic. He died in 2000. Anita Schiller had two sons, Dan and Zach, as well as grandchildren.

Schiller died on January 23, 2021, at age 94, from complications related to COVID-19 during the pandemic in San Diego.

== Selected works ==
- Schiller, Anita R. (1968). Characteristics of Professional Personnel in College and University Libraries. University of Illinois Graduate School of Library Science. OCLC 8414353.
- Schiller, Anita R. (1974) "Women in Librarianship," Advances in Librarianship v. 4, pp. 103–147.
- Schiller, Anita R.; Schiller, Herbert I. (April 17, 1982). "The Privatizing of Information: Who Can Own What America Knows?" (PDF). The Nation. pp. 461–463.

== See also ==
- Social Responsibilities Round Table
