= Janet M. Suzuki =

Janet Suzuki (1943 – 1987) was a Japanese-American librarian. Feeling that the needs of Asian American librarians were unrepresented and underserved by the American Library Association, she co-founded the Asian American Librarians Caucus (AALC) in 1975, with Henry Chang and Yen-Tsai Feng. The AALC was a discussion group within the ALA Office for Library Outreach Services, and was the first Asian-American library organization that served the pan Asian American librarian community. It was the predecessor to the Asian/Pacific American Librarians Association.

== Early life, education, and career ==
Suzuki was born in Westboro, Ohio.

She graduated from the University of Nebraska in 1968. In 1969, she received her MSLS degree from the University of Denver.

She worked for her whole career at the Chicago Public Library, providing reference services in their business, science, and technology-related divisions.

== Asian-American community involvement ==
Suzuki was a Sansei (third generation Japanese-American). She held a number of positions in the Asian-American library community and the Asian American community at large:

- Chicago Chapter of the Japanese American Citizens League, Board of Directors, 1973–1983.
- Chicago's Japanese American Resource Center (JARC), board member and Founder, 1974, and First Chair, 1975.
- Asian American Librarians Caucus (AALC), Cofounder, 1975.
- AALA's Constitution Revision Committee, Member, 1979–80.
- Asian/Pacific American Librarians Midwest Association (APALMA), Founder, 1981.
- Japanese American Youth Organization, Advisor.

== Death and legacy ==
Suzuki began to have serious health problems in the late 1970s. She retired from the Chicago Public Library in the 1980s and died from complications from lupus in 1987.

Little has been recorded about Suzuki's life. The Suzuki family and the ALA headquarters have no records of her work. Much of what is known and written about her life is written in an article by Kenneth Yamashita ("Asian/Pacific American Librarians Association— A History of APALA and Its Founders"; see below under Bibliography), who worked with Suzuki from 1975 to 1978 in the Chicago Public Library and stayed in contact with her until her death in 1987.

== Bibliography ==
Suzuki, J. (1976), Asian Americans and libraries, The ALA yearbook: A review of library events for 1975 (pp. 88–89). Chicago: American Library Association. ISSN 0364-1597

Suzuki, J.,& Yamashita, K. A. (1977). Asian American public librarians. In E.J. Josey & K. E. Peeples Jr. (Eds.), Opportunities for minorities in librarianship. Metuchen, NJ: Scare-crow Press. ISBN 0-8108-1022-0

Yamashita, Kenneth A. (2000), Asian/Pacific American Librarians Association— A History of APALA and Its Founders, Library Trends 49 (1) 2000: Ethnic Diversity in Library and Information Science: 88–109.
