= Raymond Pun =

American librarian

President-elect of the American Library Association
- Preceded by: Cindy Hohl

Personal details
- Education: St. John’s University; Queens College; California State University, Fresno
- Occupation: Librarian

Raymond Pun (Chinese: 潘宏; pinyin: Pān Hóng) is an academic and research librarian at the Alder Graduate School of Education. He was the elected president of the American Library Association for 2025–2026. On June 14, 2024, it was announced that Pun would be unable to assume the American Library Association presidency for health reasons.

== Education ==
Pun holds a bachelor's degree in history and a master's degree in East Asian studies from St. John's University in Queens, New York. He received a Master of Library Science (MLS) from Queens College. He achieved a doctor of education in educational leadership from California State University, Fresno.

== Career ==
Raymond Pun's career includes reference librarian at The New York Public Library Stephen A. Schwarzman Building (2010–2013); reference and research services librarian at New York University Shanghai (2013–2015); first year student success librarian at California State University, Fresno (2015–2018); education and outreach Manager at The Hoover Institution, Stanford University (2021–2022); academic and research librarian at the Alder Graduate School of Education (2018-2021, 2022–Present).

== Professional associations ==
Pun was president of the Chinese American Librarians Association (2022–2023) and the Asian Pacific American Librarians Association (2021-2022).

He has served on the American Library Association Council, Policy Corps, and advisory committees for two past presidents.

== Awards ==
- 2024. Asian Pacific American Librarians Association Guyatri Singh Award.
- 2018. Achievement in Library Diversity Research. American Library Association.
- 2017. Emerald Research Grant. Business and Reference Services Section of the Reference and User Services Association
- 2015. Special Libraries Association, Achievement in Academic Business Librarianship Award.
- 2012. Movers & Shakers 2012 – Change Agents. Library Journal.

== Publications ==
- Pun, Raymond and Hiromi Kubo. 2022. “Advancing Equity, Diversity, and Inclusion Initiatives in the Library Profession.” Collaborative Librarianship 13 (1): 4–6.
- Pun, Raymond, Melissa Cardenas-Dow, and Kenya S. Flash, eds. 2021. Ethnic Studies in Academic and Research Libraries. Chicago, Illinois: Association of College and Research Libraries, a division of the American Library Association.
- Bridges, Laurie M., Raymond Pun, and Roberto A. Arteaga, eds. 2021. Wikipedia and Academic Libraries: A Global Project. [Ann Arbor, Michigan]: Maize Books.
- Pun, Raymond, and Gary L. Shaffer, eds. 2019. The Sustainable Library’s Cookbook. Chicago: Association of College and Research Libraries.
- Clarke, Janet Hyunju, Raymond Pun, and Monnee Tong, eds. 2018. Asian American Librarians and Library Services : Activism, Collaborations, and Strategies. Lanham: Rowman & Littlefield.
- Pun, Raymond, and Meggan Houlihan, eds. 2017. The First-Year Experience Cookbook. Chicago: Association of College and Research Libraries, a division of the American Library Association.
- Pun, Raymond, Scott Collard, and Justin Parrott, eds. 2016. Bridging Worlds : Emerging Models and Practices of U.S. Academic Libraries around the Globe. Chicago, Illinois: Association of College and Research Libraries, a division of the American Library Association.
- Pun, Raymond, “The Value of Intellectual Freedom in Twenty First Century China: Changes, Challenges and Progress,” Library Trends, 64, no. 3, April 2016.
- Pun, Raymond, and Hiromi Kubo. 2017. “Beyond Career Collection Development: Academic Libraries Collaborating with Career Center for Student Success.” Public Services Quarterly 13 (2): 134–38.
- Anderson, Davis Erin, and Raymond Pun, eds. 2016. Career Transitions for Librarians : Proven Strategies for Moving to Another Type of Library. Lanham: Rowman & Littlefield.
