= Patty Wong (librarian) =

American librarian

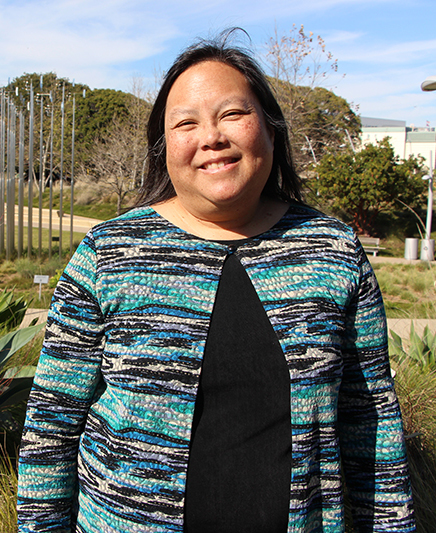
- Wong in Santa Monica in 2017

President of the American Library Association
- In office 2021–2022
- Preceded by: Julius C. Jefferson Jr.
- Succeeded by: Lessa Kananiʻopua Pelayo-Lozada

Personal details
- Born: San Francisco, California, United States
- Occupation: Librarian

Patricia "Patty" Wong is the city librarian of Santa Clara, California. Wong was the president of the American Library Association (ALA) for the 2021–2022 term and is the first Asian American president of the ALA. She has been on the faculty at the San Jose State University iSchool since 2006, teaching subjects such as equitable access to library services, library management, and library services to young people.

== Early life and education ==
Patricia Mei-Yung Wong was born and raised in San Francisco, California; she is Chinese American and a fourth generation Californian.

She earned her bachelor's degree in women's studies from the University of California at Berkeley in 1983, and went on to earn her Master of Library Science degree from the same institution in 1984.

== Career in librarianship ==
Wong began her career as a children's librarian at the Oakland Public Library, developing programming for six different branches. She arranged multiple visits to elementary schools and worked to create partnerships between the library and local churches and other community organizations. She also worked as a librarian for the Oakland Unified School District, overseeing the district library's collection and founding a (now-defunct) International Children's Library. She then took a position as a children's librarian for the Berkeley Public Library, later shifting to a role in management as a supervising librarian. This experience, along with work on the Public Libraries as Partners in Youth Development project, provided the opportunity to return to the Oakland Public Library as the Coordinator of Youth Services.

In 2001, Wong was appointed the deputy director of the Stockton-San Joaquin County Public Library. In this role she was responsible for the daily operations of a thirteen-branch system. Wong served as the director for the Yolo County Library system from 2008 to 2017, leading the nine libraries in the system. During her nine years as Yolo County Librarian, she oversaw the construction and opening of two new libraries as well as major renovations at another branch. She was also part of the team that authored the Yolo County Broadband Strategic Plan.

In 2017 she was named the Director of Library Services for the Santa Monica Public Library. In that role, she oversaw the SMPL central location and four neighborhood branches. Wong was announced as the next city librarian for the city of Santa Clara in July 2021.

Wong has been a part-time faculty at the San Jose State University School of Information since 2006, where she has taught courses on grant writing, management, and library services to young people. She has also served as a consultant for libraries on multiple topics, including fundraising, working with local communities, change management, youth development, and cultural diversity.

== Service to librarianship ==
Wong served as the president for the Asian Pacific American Librarians Association from 1999 to 2000.

She has held many leadership roles in the American Library Association, including multiple terms on the ALA Executive Board and as an at-large councilor for ALA Council, as well as chairing the ALA Budget Analysis and Review Committee. In April 2020, Wong was elected ALA 2021–2022 president, and she has since completed her term. She was the first Asian American president of the ALA.

== Awards and honors ==
California State Senator Lois Wolk selected Wong as the 5th State Senate district's 2009 Woman of the Year, citing her dedication to improving library access.

Wong was recognized for her work on diversity issues at the California State Library and her mentorship of MLIS students at San Jose State University in 2012 when she was presented with the American Library Association Equality Award

=== Additional awards ===
- Joint Conference of Librarians of Color Advocacy Award, 2006
- Library Journal Mover and Shaker, 2007
- California Library Association Member of the Year, 2013
- Distinguished Service Award by the Chinese American Librarians Association, 2015
