= Sharad Karkhanis =

Indian American librarian

- Born: 1935; India
- Died: March 28, 2013 (aged 77–78); Boca Raton, Florida, US
- Occupations: author; educator; librarian
- Known for: cofounder and first president of the Asian Pacific American Librarians Association

Academic background
- Education: University of Bombay; Rutgers University; Brooklyn College; New York University

Academic work
- Discipline: political science
- Institutions: Kingsborough Community College

Sharad Karkhanis (1935–2013) was an Indian American author, educator, and librarian who co-founded and served as the first president of the Asian Pacific American Librarians Association (APALA).

== Early life and study ==
Karkhanis was born in India in 1935. He pursued and attained a diploma in library science from the Bombay Library Association and a bachelor's degree in Economics from the University of Bombay (now the University of Mumbai). Karkhanis moved to the United States in the 1960s, where he continued his education, obtaining a Masters in Library Science from Rutgers University, a Master of Arts degree in International Relations/American Government from Brooklyn College, and a Ph.D. in American Government from New York University. The title of his two-volume doctoral dissertation was "Indian Politics and the Role of the Press" - his faculty adviser was Louis W. Koenig, and the chair of the research committee was Gisbert H. Flanz.

== Career ==
The majority of Karkhanis' career was spent at Kingsborough Community College, where he served as a lecturer in history and then as a Professor of Political Science and Libraries from 1974 to 2005. Karkhanis authored articles about the acquisition of South Asian library materials, and several books, including Indian Politics and the Role of the Press and Jewish Heritage in America: A Bibliography.

During this time, Karkhanis was an active leader in the American Library Association, leading various committees such as Council Resolutions, International Relations, the Publications Committee, and several Association of College and Research Libraries committees. He served as the president of Library Association of the City University of New York (LACUNY) from 1967 to 1969. Most notably, Karkhanis was a co-founder of the Asian Pacific American Librarians Association (APALA) and served as its first president from 1980 to 1982. He has been called a "beloved library trailblazer."

Karkhanis was the founder and editor of "The Patriot Returns," an online newsletter critical of the Professional Staff Congress faculty union and the City University of New York (CUNY) administration. Despite his claims that the newsletter was satire, Karkhanis was sued for libel and defamation in 2007 by CUNY professor Susan O'Malley.

Karkhanis died in Boca Raton, Florida, on March 28, 2013.
