= Suzine Har Nicolescu =

Asian-American librarian and educator

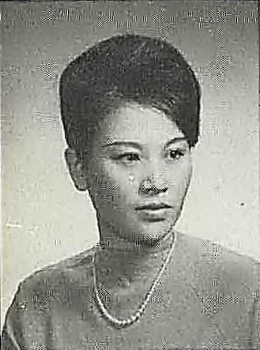
- Suzine Har Nicolescu in 1965
- Born: March 21, 1931; Seoul, South Korea
- Died: February 22, 2013 (aged 81); Chevy Chase, Maryland, US
- Education: Ewha Womans University; University of Denver; Simmons University
- Occupation: Librarian
- Spouse: Alexander Nicolescu

Suzine Har Nicolescu (March 21, 1931 – February 22, 2013) was an American librarian who was one of the founders of the Asian Pacific American Librarians Association (APALA). She served fourteen years as the chief librarian at Medgar Evers College and fought against discrimination in the library profession.

== Early life and education ==
Suzine Har was born in Seoul, Korea on March 21, 1931.

She earned a bachelor's degree at Ewha Womans University, as well as two master's degrees from the University of Denver: a Master of Library Science and a Master in Modern Languages/Literatures and Comparative Linguistics. She later went on to earn a Ph.D. in Library Information Systems from Simmons College. Her dissertation topic was "A Study to Determine a Standard Bibliographic Control System for Nonbook Materials in the City University of New York Colleges."

== Personal life ==
Suzine Har arrived in the United States on October 3, 1954, arriving in Anchorage, Alaska, on a flight from Tokyo, Japan. She married Alexander Nicolescu on June 23, 1957, in Denver, Colorado.

== Library career ==
Nicolescu worked in the University of Denver library for two years as a cataloger/bibliographer. In 1964 she joined the faculty at Illinois State University as assistant professor of library science and assistant librarian. She worked as an associate librarian/senior cataloger at the library at SUNY at Stony Brook.

In 1968 she started her long career at City University of New York, which lasted until her retirement in 1999. Nicolescu worked as the chief of technical services and deputy chief librarian at Medgar Evers College of the City University of New York, going on to serve as the registrar for the college, and in 1985 she was selected as chief librarian and chair of the college's Library and Information Division.

== Service to librarianship ==
Nicolescu was one of the founding members of the Asian Pacific American Librarians Association (APALA) when it was founded in 1980; she served as the organization's president from 1985 to 1986.

Along with fellow librarian Henry Chang, Nicolescu directed a needs assessment study for the National Commission on Libraries and Information Science Task Force on Improving Library and Information Services to Cultural Minorities. Focusing on the information needs of the Asian American community, they surveyed 240 public libraries in urban areas. Their findings "indicated that too much responsibility for multicultural service in public libraries was placed on minority librarians alone". Their 1982 report emphasized the need for an understanding of the ethnic and racial makeup of communities, appropriate language fluency, and a service-oriented positive attitude.

In 1984 she was awarded a Fulbright-Hays fellowship, conducting research on the cataloging and classification systems of the libraries of three major Korean universities: Ewha Womans University, Yonsei University, and Sogang University, investigating how those libraries' catalog information could be computerized and shared internationally. Nicolescu also lectured in Korea and other Asian countries as part of her grant.

Nicolescu talked openly about librarianship as one of the lowest paid professions, and lamented the fact that the compensation of women librarians remained far below that of men with equal responsibility. She worked to call out discrimination where she saw it and confront it with patience, objectivity, and effort. She encouraged librarians from around the world to unite in pursuing common goals such as equal access to information.

Nicolescu died February 22, 2013, in Chevy Chase, Maryland.
