= Redondo Beach Public Library =

- Historic Redondo Beach Public Library
- U.S. National Register of Historic Places
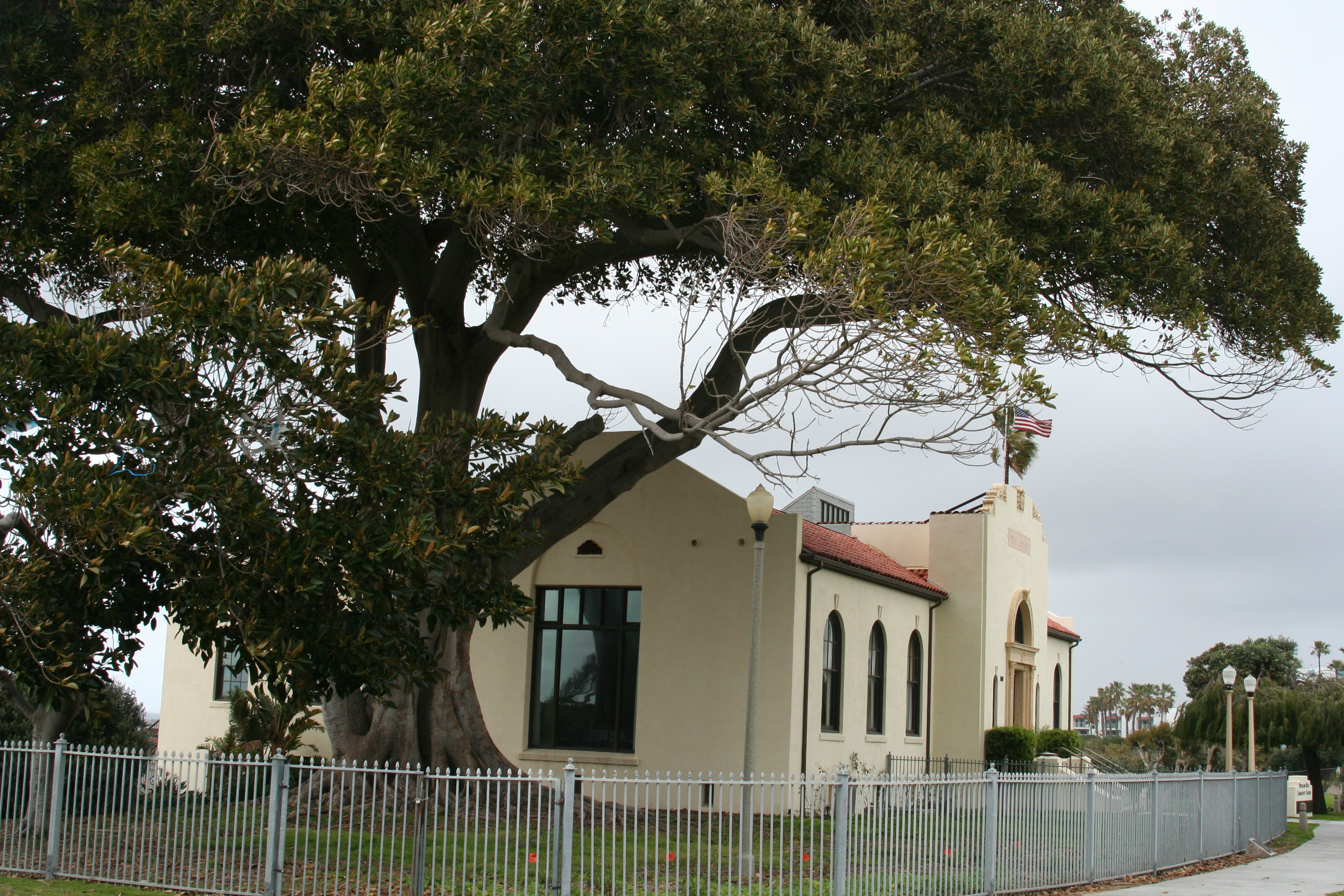

- Location within California
- Location: 309 Esplanade St., Redondo Beach, California
- Coordinates: 33°50′16″N 118°23′20″W
- Built: 1930
- Architect: Lovell Bearse Pemberton
- Architectural style: Mission/Spanish Revival
- NRHP reference No.: 81000158
- Added to NRHP: March 12, 1981

The old Redondo Beach Public Library is a small Spanish mission-style public works building located in Redondo Beach, California. It was built in the 1930s by Lovell Bearse Pemberton and is located adjacent to the Redondo Beach Pier, a popular tourist attraction in the Los Angeles Metropolitan Area. The building's main entrance faces east, towards a large open space park filled with a veterans' memorial and playground. The backside of the building faces the Pacific Ocean and offers benches for tourists to enjoy the view. The new library was opened in 1995.
