= Knowledge River =

Program at the University of Arizona

Knowledge River is a program within the School of Information (SI) at the University of Arizona in Tucson that focuses on educating information professionals who have experience with and sensitivity to Latino and Native American populations. Knowledge River also fosters understanding of library and information issues from the perspectives of Hispanic and Native Americans and advocates for culturally sensitive library and information services to these communities. "Knowledge River brings Hispanics and American Indians into [the SI] graduate program and succeeds by building coalitions between the library, library school, academic departments on campus and the surrounding community and serves as a role model of how it can be done."

== Operations ==
Each year, Knowledge River selects a cohort of students to be Knowledge River Scholars. Knowledge River Scholars receive a financial aid package and opportunities for academic support, specialized advising, and professional development activities, as well as regular SIRLS services and activities. Financial aid for Knowledge River Scholars comes mainly in the form of graduate assistantships, which allow students to gain practical experience in libraries and other information environments. Knowledge River Scholars graduate with an American Library Association ALA-accredited MA in Information Resources and Library Science.

Knowledge River aims to help graduates implement information and technology among their community members. The program allows graduates to contribute differing cultural perspectives to those outside of Native American and Hispanic communities. Notable alumni include Allison Boucher Krebs, who was the Chair of the Society of American Archivists Native American Archives Roundtable and on the Advisory Board of the Association of Tribal Archives, Libraries, and Museums.

== Grants and awards ==
In 2001, the University of Arizona School of Information Resources and Library Science applied a $500,000 federal grant to boost the numbers of Hispanics and American Indians who are employed as academic or public librarians. This grant from the U.S. Institute of Museum and Library Science was awarded to launch the "Knowledge River" project, aimed at increasing minority recruitment in library and information science degree programs. Fewer than five percent of librarians are Hispanic and less than one percent of them are American Indian. "We will work with local and national experts to develop and enrich our curriculum and develop research projects" says Brooke Sheldon, then director of SIRLS.

In 2011, Knowledge River received an additional award of $844,965 through the Laura Bush 21st Century Librarians IMLS Grant Program. Aside from using these funds to add 33 new library science students, the money will be used to improve the online presence of the program.
