= Library instruction =

Library instruction, also called bibliographic instruction, user education and library orientation, is the process where librarians teach their patrons how to access information in libraries. It often involves instruction about research and organizational tools and methods. It prepares individuals to make immediate and lifelong use of information effectively by teaching the concepts and logic of information access and evaluation, and by fostering information independence and critical thinking. Above all they are aimed at equipping library users with skills to locate library sources and use them effectively to satisfy their information needs.

== History ==
Library instruction began in the nineteenth century in the United States. In 1880, Justin Winsor, president of the American Library Association (ALA), redefined the role of the librarian as also a teacher. In a 1912 ALA survey, 57% of respondents offered required or elective library instruction courses. There was little academic interest in the subject until the 1960s and early 1970s, when interest blossomed. During this time, library instruction had solidified into a system where librarians would teach their patrons not only how to locate information in a physical library, but how to interact with the material, how to learn it, and how to apply those skills to their everyday lives. The newfound rise in the popularity of library sciences precipitated the creation of the Library Orientation Exchange (LOEX), "a non-profit, self-supporting educational clearinghouse". With its collection of print and digital materials, the organization had over 650 members in North America, Europe, Africa, and the Middle East in 1999.

In research libraries, the bibliographic instruction started to be a mainstream and standard library service. Library instruction pioneer Miriam Sue Dudley's library instruction materials, originally produced in 1970 for a Chicano student group at UCLA, are an example of such materials now available online.

Library instruction is evolving to adapt to the changing concepts of information use and understanding. Model programs, in order to be meaningful and effective, should respond to the changing information environment. New methods of library instruction, such as the Cephalonian method, reflect changes in instructional technology and education theory. Information and communication technology literacy (ICT) is an example of a modern approach to library instruction. ICT extends information literacy to the use of computer technology in a variety of forms to manipulate, deliver, and receive information and ideas. A model library instruction program utilizes complementary tools and resources to deliver memorable, interactive instruction. These resources are necessary to engage the attention of contemporary patrons immersed in a media environment.

== Relationship to information literacy ==
According to the Presidential Committee on Information Literacy, information literacy is the set of skills a person needs to be "able to recognize when information is needed and the ability to locate, evaluate, and use effectively the needed information." In an academic setting, instruction in information literacy can take on a variety of forms, such as a long class or a project integrated into a course on related subject matter. In the United States, literacy competency standards are outlined by the Association of college and Research Libraries. In U.S. higher education, the Association of College and Research Libraries (ACRL) promotes the Framework for Information Literacy for Higher Education (filed in 2015 and adopted in 2016), after rescinding the earlier Information Literacy Competency Standards for Higher Education.

Currently there are debates about whether instruction on how to use library systems is necessary, or if efforts are better spent making systems easier to use so that they require no instruction. A particular study published in the Journal of Academic Librarianship indicates that the most predominant model of teaching information literacy, the one-shot session model, is ineffective and does not really make a perceptible difference in the grades of the students. However, the same study also indicated that students who attended a longer class with a library instruction session scored significantly higher, indicating that it may not be the idea of the instruction that is flawed, but rather the method.

== Formats ==
Library instruction sessions can be held in person, through pre-recorded or written materials, or live over the internet. In-person sessions can, as part of a formal class, in small groups, or one-on-one. After 2015, webinars began to be part of the library instruction programs. During the 2020 COVID-19 pandemic, this form of teaching became the norm for university libraries around the world.

One-on-one sessions held by universities are sometimes referred to as a "term paper clinic" or a "research consultation." Universities may also incorporate library instruction sessions as part of regular coursework, for example, as a one-shot class meeting held just before a term paper is assigned. The goal of the librarian is to orient the class to the best library sources for use in a term paper. Course-related instruction, while perceived as effective, is a staff-intensive process led by professors and not librarians.

Library instruction can also benefit from the utilization of video games and gaming designed for information literacy. When incorporating design principles from gaming into information literacy instruction, instructional librarians can teach students how to succeed through long, complex, and difficult tasks while still keeping the learning experience engaging. Library instruction and active learning information literacy workshops can also be facilitated by theater techniques, by the rules of hospitality or by humor.

=== Critical library instruction ===
Critical library instruction is rooted in the idea that knowledge is culturally situated, and thus, instruction must be as well. Characterized by a praxis-based approach that is deeply connected to the context and information needs of the learner, critical library instruction always begins with an assessment of the learner's context and their information needs. Critical library instruction problematizes traditional methods of teaching information literacy skills as privileging particular ways of knowing in academic contexts, and instead advocates a method of teaching that emphasizes the learner's frame of reference and information needs.

Influenced by critical pedagogy, an educational philosophy that address problems and questions of particular relevance to the lives of students, critical library instruction aims to provide the same approach to students’ information needs and practices. From critical literacy, critical library instruction approaches literacy as political and literacy instruction as a political act; thus, critical library instruction requires instructors to maintain awareness of power dynamics, identity intersections, and to challenge their own definitions of literacy in order to provide meaningful instruction to their particular students.

== See also ==
- Accessibility
- CRAAP test
- Information cycle
- Information literacy
- Cephalonian method
- Usability
