= Chinese American Librarians Association =

- Formation: 1973
- Type: Non-profit NGO
- Purpose: To support the professional development and research scholarship of CALA members, advocate Chinese American librarians in professional organizations and enhance the leadership development of Chinese American librarians through training, mentoring, networking, and collaboration with colleagues in the United States and abroad.
- Headquarters: Camarillo, California
- Region served: United States Canada
- President: Lei Jin
- Website: cala-web.org

The Chinese American Librarians Association or CALA (Chinese: 華人圖書館員協會) is a library association that supports professional development and research scholarship of CALA members, in the profession of librarianship.

CALA is an affiliate of American Library Association (ALA), International Federation of Library Associations and Institutions (IFLA), and Joint Council of Librarians of Color (JCLC).

== History ==
The Mid-West Chinese American Librarians Association began on March 31, 1973, founded by Dr. Tze-Chung Li and Dorothy Li, as a regional organization in Illinois. Then in 1974 the Chinese Librarians Association was founded in California, at Stanford University. In 1976, the Mid-West Chinese American Librarians Association expanded to a national organization as the Chinese American Librarians Association. In 1983 the Chinese American Librarians Association and the Chinese Librarians Association (CLA) were merged into one organization, under the name Chinese American Librarians Association (in English) and the Chinese Librarians Association's Chinese name (華人圖書館員協會). This one organization has members not only in America but in China, Hong Kong, Canada, and more. It promotes the Chinese culture through the outlet of libraries and communicates with others in the profession of librarianship. It is the largest Asian-American body of its kind.

In 2006, the Chinese American Librarians Association took part in the first Joint Conference of Librarians of Color, along with the American Indian Library Association, the Asian Pacific American Librarians Association, the Black Caucus of the American Library Association, and REFORMA. This conference was the first national conference sponsored and held by those organizations, which are known as the Associations of Ethnic Librarians.

The Joint Council of Librarians of Color (JCLC, Inc.) was founded in June of 2015 as an organization "that advocates for and addresses the common needs of the American Library Association ethnic affiliates"; these ethnic affiliates include the Chinese American Librarians Association, as well as the American Indian Library Association, the Asian Pacific American Librarians Association, the Black Caucus of the American Library Association, and REFORMA: The National Association to Promote Library & Information Services to Latinos and the Spanish Speaking.

=== Objectives of CALA ===
- To enhance communication among Chinese American librarians as well as between Chinese American librarians and other librarians.
- To serve as a forum for discussions of mutual problems and professional concerns among Chinese American librarians.
- To promote Sino-American librarianship and library services, and the development of Chinese American librarianship and service.
- To provide a vehicle whereby Chinese American librarians may cooperate with other organizations having similar or allied interests.

=== CALA Chapters ===
Greater Mid-Atlantic (GMA): Delaware, Maryland, Pennsylvania, Virginia, West Virginia, Washington D.C.

Midwest (MW): Illinois, Indiana, Iowa, Kansas, Kentucky, Michigan, Minnesota, Missouri, Nebraska, North Dakota, Ohio, South Dakota, Wisconsin

Northeast (NE): Connecticut, Maine, Massachusetts, New Hampshire, New Jersey, New York, Rhode Island, Vermont

Northern California (NCA): Northern part of California: north of San Luis, Obisbo/Bakersfield

Southern California (SCA): Southern part of California: south of San Luis, Obisbo/Bakersfield

Southeast (SE): Alabama, Florida, Georgia, Mississippi,

North Carolina, South Carolina, Tennessee: Southwest (SW), Arizona, Arkansas, Colorado, Louisiana, Nevada, New Mexico, Oklahoma, Texas, Utah

All Other U.S. States (OUS): Alaska, Hawaii, Idaho, Montana, Oregon, Washington, Wyoming

Canada (CAN): All provinces and territories

Asia-Pacific (AP): Asia-Pacific region

== Membership ==
Any individual or corporate body interested in the purpose of the Association may become a member upon payment of the dues as provided for in the Bylaws. The CALA community has over 600 members, 15% personal members, 14% international members, 8% students, 58% life members, and 5% representing a diverse array of affiliations. The organization consists of nine chapters that span across North America and Asia Pacific. Although a majority of members are located in the United States, 20% are in the Asia Pacific area and 5% in Canada. 56% of members work in the academic library sector and 18% in the public library sector, and the rest in school or special libraries.

== Governing Structure ==
=== Executive Directors ===
Executive Directors serve in 3 year terms and "shall be the chief administrative officer of the Association; assist the president and other officers of the Association in carrying out their responsibilities consistent with the policies established by the Board; keep a record of the Board meetings and membership meetings; communicate to members and to others such information as may be requested by the Board or the president; serve as the liaison officer with the American Library Association, chapters and affiliates of the Association, and other outside agencies; sign all contracts and legal documents as co-signatory with the president; oversee bank accounts with the treasurer as co-signatory; and perform other duties as may be prescribed by the Board or the Executive Committee."

- Michael Bailou Huang (2022–Present)
- Lian Ruan (2016–2022)
- Zheng (Jessica) Lu (2015–2016)
- Li Fu (2013–2015)
- Haipeng Li (2008–2013)
- Shixing Wen (2007–2008)
- Sally C. Tseng (1997–2007)
- Seetoo Amy D (1995–1999)
- Sheila Lai (1992–1995)
- Eveline Liu Yang (1989–1992)
- Seetoo Amy D Wilson (1983–1989)
- John Lai (1980–1983)
- Tze-chung Li (1975–1980)

=== Presidents ===
Presidents of CALA serve four-year terms, including one as vice president elect, vice-president/president elect and one as past president. Past and current presidents of CALA are:

After CALA and CLA merged on January 1, 1983:

- Allison Wang (2027-2028)
- Anthony Chow (2026-2027)
- Lei Jin (2026-2027)
- Yan He (2025–2026)
- Guoying (Grace) Liu (2024–2025)
- Vincci Kwong (2023–2024)
- Raymond Pun (2022–2023)
- Wenli Gao (2021–2022)
- Hong Yao (2020–2021)
- Fu Zhuo (2019–2020)
- Ying Zhang (2018–2019)
- Le Yang (2017–2018)
- Qi Chen (2016–2017)
- Lian Ruan (2015–2016)
- Carol Gee (2014–2015)
- Lisa Zhao (2013–2014)
- Esther Lee (2012–2013)
- Min Chou (2011–2012)
- Zhijia Shen (2010–2011)
- Xudong Jin (2009–2010)
- Sha Li Zhang (2008–2009)
- Dora Ho (2007–2008)
- Haipeng Li (2006–2007)
- Diana Wu (2005–2006)
- Shixing Wen (2004–2005)
- Amy Tsiang (2003–2004)
- Angela Yang (2002–2003)
- Liana Zhou (2001–2022)
- Yu-Lan Chou (2000–2001)
- Ling Hwey Jeng (1999–2000)
- Linna Yu (1998–1999)
- Harriet Ying (1997–1998)
- Menxiong Liu (1996–1997)
- Wilfred Fong (1995–1996)
- Linda Tse (1994–1995)
- Betty Tsai (1993–1994)
- Carl Chan (1992–1993)
- Roy Chang (1991–1992)
- Amy D. Seetoo (1990–1991)
- Peter R. Young (1989–1990)
- Chang-chien Lee (1988–1989)
- Irene Yeh (1987–1988)
- Marjorie H. Li (1986–1987)
- William Wan (1985–1986)
- Sally C. Tseng (1984–1985)
- Norma Yueh (1983–1984)
- Bessie K. Hahn (1982–1983)

CLA (Chinese Librarians Association)

- Susana Juh-mei Liu (1981–1982)
- Lillian L. Chan (1980–1981)
- George W. Huang (1979–1980)
- Raymond Tang (1978–1979)
- Mark Tam (1977–1978)
- George Cheng (1976–1977)
- T. C. Wong (1975–1976)
- Irene Yeh (1974–1975)

CALA

- David Ta-ching Liu (1981–1982)
- Lee-hsia Ting (1980–1981)
- John Yung-hsiang La (1979–1980)
- Hwa-wei Lee (1978–1979)
- Robert Pin-chuan Chen (1980–1981)
- Tze-Chung Li (1973–1977)

== Resources and Publications ==
- CALA Website: CALA - Chinese American Librarians Association
- CALASYS - CALA Academic Resource & Repository System: Browse Exhibits · CALASYS - CALA Academic Resources & Repository System
- International Journal of Librarianship (IJoL) : About the Journal
- CALA YouTube: CALAChannel - YouTube

== See also ==
- List of libraries in the United States
