= Asian Pacific American Librarians Association =

American organization of library workers

- Formation: 1980; 46 years ago
- Type: Non-profit organization
- Region served: United States
- Members: 600
- President: Tina Chan
- Website: apalaweb.org

The Asian Pacific American Librarians Association (APALA), also known as the Asian/Pacific American Librarians Association, is an affiliate of the American Library Association (ALA). It was created to "address the needs of Asian/Pacific American librarians and those who serve Asian/Pacific American communities."

== History ==
APALA was the successor to the Asian American Librarians Caucus (AALC), a discussion group within the ALA Office for Library Outreach Services. That discussion group was founded at the 1975 ALA Annual Conference, by Janet M. Suzuki, Henry Chang, and Yen-Tsai Feng. It was the first Asian-American library organization that served the pan Asian American librarian community.

APALA itself was established in 1980, incorporated in 1981, and became part of the ALA in 1982.

The founders of APALA included Lourdes Collantes, Suzine Har Nicolescu, Sharad Karkhanis, Conchita Pineda, Henry Chang, Betty Tsai, and Tamiye Trejo Meehan.

Asian Pacific Americans comprise one of the four ethnic/racial groups that is underrepresented in the library profession as compared to the U.S. population as a whole. As of 1997, APALA had approximately 300 members, of whom 40% were Chinese, 16% were Korean, 14% were East Indian, 10% were Filipino, and the remaining 20% belonged to 13 additional ethnic groups.

In 2006, APALA took part in the first Joint Conference of Librarians of Color, along with the American Indian Library Association, the Black Caucus of the American Library Association, the Chinese American Librarians Association, and REFORMA. This conference was the first national conference sponsored and held by those organizations, which are known as the Associations of Ethnic Librarians.

The Joint Council of Librarians of Color (JCLC, Inc.) was founded in June 2015 as an organization “that advocates for and addresses the common needs of the American Library Association ethnic affiliates“; these ethnic affiliates include the APALA, as well as the American Indian Library Association, the Black Caucus of the American Library Association, the Chinese American Librarians Association, and REFORMA: The National Association to Promote Library & Information Services to Latinos and the Spanish Speaking.

In 2020, Patty Wong, former APALA President, was elected as the first Asian American president of ALA for 2021-2022. In 2021, Lessa Kananiʻopua Pelayo-Lozada, former APALA President, was elected as ALA's first Native Hawaiian/Pacific Islander American president for 2022-2023.

== Publications and programs ==
APALA publishes a quarterly newsletter and meets annually at ALA conferences. It also provides scholarships to library school students and awards the annual Asian/Pacific American Awards for Literature, which honors books by or about Asian Pacific Americans.

== Executive Directors and Presidents ==
Executive Directors of APALA serve three-year terms and as ex officio member of the Executive Board. Past and current executive directors of APALA are:

- Jaena Rae Cabrera (2023-2025)
- Alanna Aiko Moore (2022 - 2023)
- Lessa Kananiʻopua Pelayo-Lozada (2019-2022)
- Buenaventura (Ven) B. Basco (2012-2019)
- Gerardo “Gary” Colmenar (2006-2012)
- Ling Hwey Jeng (2000-2006)

Presidents of APALA serve three-year terms, including one as Vice-President/President Elect and one as Past President. Past and current presidents of APALA are:

- Jamie Kurumaji, (2027-2028)
- Tina Chan, (2026-2027)
- Eileen K. Bosch, (2025-2026)
- Jaena Rae Cabrera, (2024-2025)
- Jaena Rae Cabrera, (2023-2024)
- Annie Pho, 2022-2023)
- Raymond Pun (2021-2022)
- Candice Wing-yee Mack (2020-2021)
- Alanna Aiko Moore (2019-2020)
- Paolo P. Gujilde (2018-2019)
- Dora T. Ho (2017-2018)
- Lessa Kanani’opua Pelayo-Lozada (2016-2017)
- Janet H. Clarke (2015-2016)
- Eileen K. Bosch (2014-2015)
- Eugenia Beh (2013-2014)
- Jade Alburo (2012-2013)
- Sandy Wee (2011-2012)
- Florante Ibanez (2010-2011)
- Sherise Kimura (2009-2010)
- Michelle Baildon (2008-2009)
- Buenaventura (Ven) B. Basco (2007-2008)
- Benjamin Wakashige (2006-2007)
- Ganga Dakshinamurti (2005-2006)
- Heawon Paick (2004-2005)
- Yvonne Chen (2003-2004)
- Gerardo (Gary) Colmenar (2002-2003)
- Tamiye Meehan (2001-2002)
- Sushila Shah (2000-2001)
- Patricia Mei-Yung Wong (1999-2000)
- Soon J. Jung (1998-1999)
- Abulfazal M. F. Kabir (1997-1998)
- Kenneth A. Yamashita (1996-1997)
- Amy D. Seetoo (1995-1996)
- Erlinda Regner (1994-1995)
- Ravindra N. Sharma (1993-1994)
- Marjorie Li (1992-1993)
- Charlotte Chung-Sook Kim (1991-1992)
- Abdul J. Miah (1990-1991)
- Ichiko Morita (1989-1990)
- Conchita Pineda (1988-1989)
- Betty Tsai (1987-1988)
- Asha Capoor (1986-1987)
- Suzine Har Nicolescu (1985-1986)
- Victor Okim (1984-1985)
- Lourdes Collantes (1983-1984)
- Sally Tseng (1982-1983)
- Sharad Karkhanis (1980-1982)

== See also ==
- List of libraries in the United States
