= American Indian Library Association =

Professional US library association focusing on American Indians and Alaska Natives

- Formation: 1979
- Type: Non-profit organization
- Region served: United States
- President: Cassy Leeport
- Website: ailanet.org

The American Indian Library Association (AILA) is an affiliate of the American Library Association (ALA), and is a membership action group that focuses on the library-related needs of Native Americans and Alaska Natives. The organization's members consist of both individuals and institutions that are interested in improving library services to Native American people in any type of library in the United States.

== History ==
The American Indian Library Association was officially established in 1979 as a result of the Indian White House Pre-Conference of 1978 on Indian Library and Information Services On or Near Reservations. This Pre-Conference took place in Denver, Colorado, and its focus was on the amelioration of library services and resources to American Indians. The individuals who attended the meeting represented a number of Indian tribes from different parts of the United States. The initial idea of such an organization began in the early 1970s, however. In 1971, at the ALA's Annual Conference in Dallas, Texas, Lotsee Patterson, Charles Townley, and Virginia Mathews formed a Task Force on American Indians within the Social Responsibilities Round Table and held an initial meeting. Around the same time, the ALA Advisory Committee in the Office for Library Service to the Disadvantaged created the Committee on Library Service for American Indian People, in which Charles Townley served as the first chair. Additional issues that influenced the creation of the organization were the implementation of tribal libraries and changes in United States federal law that reflected the increasing concern regarding the inadequacy of library services to American Indians. The AILA held its first meeting as an individual entity in New York during the ALA's 1980 Annual Conference, its constitution was passed the following year during the Annual Conference in San Francisco and, in 1985, the ALA Executive Board finally approved the AILA as an affiliate during the ALA Annual Conference in Chicago, Illinois.

The Joint Council of Librarians of Color (JCLC, Inc.) was founded in June of 2015 as an organization "that advocates for and addresses the common needs of the American Library Association ethnic affiliates"; these ethnic affiliates include the AILA, as well as the Asian Pacific American Librarians Association, the Black Caucus of the American Library Association, the Chinese American Librarians Association, and REFORMA: The National Association to Promote Library & Information Services to Latinos and the Spanish Speaking.

== Membership ==
Annual membership costs $40 for organizations (such as libraries, tribal governments, or other institutions), while individuals must pay $20 and students must pay $10. Membership includes a subscription to the American Indian Libraries Semi-Annual Newsletter and AILA-L, a discussion group for all AILA members. Members are also encouraged to join one or more of the committees listed below.

== Governing Structure ==
The AILA is governed by an Executive Board, which meets annually and delegates to the Association's committees that are listed below. The Board enables those committees to both develop and implement programs and activities that are in accordance with the Executive Board's policies.

== Committees ==
Current ad hoc AILA committees include the Budget and Finance Committee, By-Laws and Constitution Committee, Children's Literature Award Committee, Communications and Publications Committee, Development and Fundraising Committee, Distinguished Service Award Committee, Nominating Committee, Programming Committee, Subject Access and Classification Committee, and the Scholarship Review Board.

== Goals ==
According to Loriene Roy's "Retaining Cultural Identity in a Transformed Future: the American Indian Library Association Response to ALA Goal 2000," as excerpted onto the AILA's official website:

1. Promotes the establishment, maintenance, and upgrading of Indian libraries on or near reservations and in other rural and urban areas;
2. Develops criteria and standards for Indian libraries, and works for their adoption by other associations and accrediting agencies;
3. Provides technical assistance to Indian tribes on the establishment and maintenance of archival services;
4. Builds support for the development of Indian information networks, facilitating the exchange of information among Indian tribes, and also among these groups and major institutions maintaining Indian archives;
5. Educates legislators, public officials, and the general public about the library/information needs of Indians communities;
6. Brings together those interested in Indian libraries and cultures at ALA conferences and other library and educational conferences;
7. Helps members of individual Indian communities to gain access to and use existing libraries to their best advantage;
8. Works to enhance the capability of libraries to assist tribes and individual Indian authors in writing tribal histories and other Indian-related works;
9. Encourages and helps to coordinate and plan the development of courses, workshops, institutes, and internships on Indian library services;
10. Develops grant proposals and conducts fund-raising activities to support these and other Indian library projects; and
11. Helps develop awareness in the majority society that Indian people desire library information resources to help unlock their potential.

== Activities ==
The AILA participates in a multitude of programs, awards, outreach services, conferences, and publications. Below is a list of those that are quite prominent and notable.

=== Awards ===
American Indian Youth Literature Awards
The AILA American Indian Youth Literature Awards are given to books in three categories: picture book, middle school, and young adult. The awards were first presented in October 2006 during the Joint Conference of Librarians of Color, and they attempt to "identify and honor the very best writing and illustrations by and about American Indians." Winners of the awards are given $500, in addition to a commemorative plaque.

Honoring Our Elders
This is a Distinguished Service Award that honors either active or retired AILA members. The award was established in 2003; Lotsee Patterson was the first recipient. To be considered, an individual must have demonstrated "significant and continuous service to the ongoing operations and growth of the American Indian Library Association; service to Indian communities and exceptional progress in his/her career development that has resulted in specific and extraordinary service to the American Indian Library Association; [and] work for the improvement in library and information services for and to American Indian people."

Virginia Mathews Memorial Scholarship
This AILA Scholarship is an annual award that was officially created in July 2000, yet first awarded for the 2002-2003 academic school year, in order to encourage librarianship among American Indian students. The scholarship was renamed in 2012 to the "Virginia Mathews Memorial Scholarship" to honor the legacy of one of the founding members of the association. One reason for the award is the idea that there "needs to be American Indian library professionals to help guide information seekers to the facts about American Indians - past, present, and future, and to incorporate American Indian perspectives in those institutions that mandate how people are taught and what they learn." To be eligible for the scholarship award, an individual must be either an American Indian or an Alaska Native that lives and works within the Indian community, who is either currently enrolled or will soon be enrolled in an accredited Masters of Library and Information Science graduate program. Preference is given to individuals who are employed in a tribal library or another library serving American Indian populations. This scholarship is particularly necessary and relevant considering the fact that, per a 2004 report by the Association for Library and Information Science Education (ALISE), American Indians made up only about 0.3 percent of all the graduates from library-related undergraduate, graduate, and doctoral programs in the preceding academic school year.

=== Outreach ===
American Library Association Office for Diversity, Literacy and Outreach Services
The AILA is one of five ethnic groups affiliated with the ALA - the other four being the Asian/Pacific American Librarians Association (APALA), the Black Caucus of American Library Association (BCALA), the Chinese American Librarians Association (CALA), and the National Association to Promote Library and Information Services to Latinos and the Spanish Speaking (REFORMA). As such, it works closely with the ALA Office for Diversity, Literacy and Outreach Services (ODLOS), previously known as the Office for Literacy and Outreach Services.

=== Conferences ===
American Library Association Conference
Aside from its annual business meeting that takes place during the ALA's annual meeting, the AILA co-sponsors the ALA's popular Annual Conference.

International Indigenous Librarians Forum
The AILA supports this conference, which takes place every two years, in order to address major issues and concerns facing libraries and other organizations that deal with indigenous information. The conference also focuses on the similarities of the Native experience within the Library and Information Science profession, in addition to encouraging the discussion of different indigenous viewpoints. Past conferences have been held in New Zealand, Australia, Sweden, Canada, and the United States.

Joint Conference of Librarians of Color
In 2006, the AILA participated in the first Joint Conference of Librarians of Color (JCLC), titled "Gathering at the Waters: Embracing Our Spirits, Telling Our Stories". This conference took place between October 12–15 in Dallas, TX, and took the five ALA ethnic associations representing librarians of color roughly eight years to coordinate. The participants - who included library directors, library staff, ALA leaders, and others - totaled over 1,200. As one of the ethnic affiliates, the AILA sponsored the event and contributed $2,000. A second, highly anticipated conference was hoped for soon, but all five ethnic caucuses had to agree on how to arrange it. Two preferred ideas were (1) to implement a five-year timeline for "JCLCII," or (2) to have the second meeting in conjunction with a future ALA annual conference. At the 2008 ALA Annual Conference in Anaheim, CA, however, the five ethnic associations began officially planning for the future "JCLC2012". JCLC2012 was held in Kansas City, Missouri Sept 19-23, 2012. The third Joint Conference of Librarians of Color was held in Albuquerque, New Mexico, September 26–30, 2018.

=== Publication ===
American Indian Libraries Newsletter
The AILA's Newsletter, American Indian Libraries, is published quarterly and informs its readers about decisions made during the AILA's business meetings, in addition to containing information on "programs, projects, grants, and resources relating to American Indian culture and library and information services." The publication also features book reviews, job announcements, and other pertinent information regarding the Association's goals.

== Press Releases ==
On February 1, 2019, the AILA released a statement showing support for 2019 ALA Midwinter Meeting & Exhibits conference goers who experienced racism and discrimination. The AILA further mentioned continuing to work alongside the American Library Association (ALA) to battle discrimination, racism, and bias.

== See also ==
- List of libraries in the United States
