= List of presidents of the American Library Association =

The following is a list of presidents of the American Library Association.

== Background ==
The American Library Association (ALA), founded in 1876 and chartered in 1879, is the largest professional organization for librarians in the United States. The headquarters of the American Library Association is in Chicago, Illinois.

== Role and responsibilities ==
Since 1889, the President of the ALA serves a term of one year, and during each election (held every two years), the president's immediate successor is also elected, serving as vice president until the start of their own term. The Vice President appoints members of committees on recommendation of the presidents-elect of the divisions, subject to approval from the Board.

In practice, despite being the legal head of the Association, the President of the ALA is mostly a figurehead, with most of their unique duties revolving around representing/acting as spokesperson for the Association to the public and other organizations, maintaining unity and values in the organization, protecting the executive director from inappropriate interference by members, and presiding at Board and Council Meetings, although they can appoint interim members of committees in the case of a vacancy until a successor is determined. The executive board administers established policies and programs and manages overall affairs of the organization (such as financial and progress reports) while giving policy recommendations to the council, while the executive director (elected at the pleasure of the Board) manages day-to-day operations and the headquarters. The President, Vice President, immediate past President, Treasurer, and executive director are all members of the executive board (along with other members selected by the council for three-year terms), with the President acting as chairperson. The governing body is the council, which determines the policies of the Association, and to which all American Library Association units are responsible. Members of the Board are also ex-officio members of the council, although the executive director cannot vote, and the President can only vote in case of a tie.

== Table of ALA presidents ==
Image	Name	Term	Other ALA posts	Other accomplishments
	Justin Winsor	1876–1885	Also served as president July–Oct 1897.	President of the American Historical Association, 1887. Director, Boston Public Library; Director Harvard Library.
	William Frederick Poole	1885–1887		President of the American Historical Association, 1888. Librarian, Boston Mercantile Library; Director, Boston Athenaeum; Director, Cincinnati Public Library; Director, Chicago Public Library; Director, Newberry Library.
	Charles Ammi Cutter	1887–1889		Developed the Cutter Expansive Classification system which became the basis for the top categories of the Library of Congress Classification; Director of the Boston Athenaeum,1869-1892.
	Frederick Morgan Crunden	1889–1890		Director St. Louis Public Library, 1877–1909; First president of the Missouri State Library Association.
	Melvil Dewey	1890 – July 1891	Also served as president 1892–1893; Served as treasurer, 1876–1877 and 1880–1881; Served as secretary 1879–1890 and 1897–1898.	Developer of the Dewey Decimal System.
	Samuel Swett Green	July–Nov 1891		"Father of reference work."
	Klas August Linderfelt	October 16, 1891 – May 22, 1892	Councilor 1883–1891, vice president 1890–1891. Resigned following his arrest for embezzling from the Milwaukee Public Library and the executive board voted Fletcher the new president, retroactive to the beginning of the term. To this day, Linderfelt is absent from official ALA lists of its past presidents.	First librarian of the Milwaukee Public Library, 1880–1892
	William Isaac Fletcher	May 22, 1892 – 1892	Editor of ALA Index to General Literature.	Director, Amherst College library, 1883–1911.
	Melvil Dewey	1892–1893	See above.	
	Josephus Nelson Larned	1893–1894	Chair ALA Advisory Committee to select 5,000 volumes for a model library at the World's Columbian Exposition	President of the New York Library Association in 1896.
	Henry Munson Utley	1894–1895		Director of the Detroit Public Library 1885–1913.
	John Cotton Dana	1895–1896		Founder of the Newark Museum, 1909. Founder of the Special Libraries Association.
	William Howard Brett	1896–1897		Developed the library school program at Western Reserve University. Dean, 1903.
	Justin Winsor	July–Oct 1897	See above.	
	Rutherford P. Hayes	Oct 1897-Jan 1898	Vice-president Hayes (son of U.S. President Rutherford B. Hayes) assumed the office of Acting President upon the death of Winsor without election by the executive board, despite the fact that it was unclear whether or not the ALA constitution allowed this. His successor, Putnam, was elected president following a special election.	
	Herbert Putnam	Jan.–Aug 1898	Also served as president 1903–1904.	Librarian of Congress, 1899–1939.
	William Coolidge Lane	1898–1899	Served as ALA secretary and treasurer for fourteen years and as chairman of its publishing board.	Director of Harvard University Library, President of the Bibliographical Society of America.
	Reuben Gold Thwaites	1899–1900		President of the Mississippi Valley Historical Association, 1910.
	Henry James Carr	1900–1901	Also served as treasurer, 1886–1893; Served as secretary 1898–1900.	Director of Scranton Public Library, 1891–1929.
	John Shaw Billings	1901–1902		First director of the New York Public Library. Modernizer of the Library of the Surgeon General's Office.
	James Kendall Hosmer	1902–1903		Director, Minneapolis Public Library, 1892–1904. Author of many history books including The American Civil War.
	Herbert Putnam	1903–1904	See above.	
	Ernest Cushing Richardson	1904–1905		Richardson Classification.
	Frank Pierce Hill	1905–1906	Also served as secretary 1891–1895.	First director of the Newark Public Library, 1889.
	Clement Walker Andrews	1906–1907		President of the American Library Institute from 1922 to 1924.
	Arthur Elmore Bostwick	1907–1908		Director of Saint Louis Public Library, 1909–1938.
	Charles Henry Gould	1908–1909	Chaired ALA Committee on Interlibrary Loan.	First university librarian at McGill University, 1892, President of the Bibliographical Society of America
	Nathaniel Dana Carlile Hodges	1909–1910		Director of the Cincinnati Public Library, 1900–1924. Notable Ohio Librarians Hall of Fame, 1980.
	James Ingersoll Wyer	1910–1911	Also served as secretary, 1902–1909. From 1916 to 1920, chaired Library War Service Committee.	Director of the New York State Library, 1908–1938.
Theresa West Elmendorf	Theresa West Elmendorf	1911–1912	American Library Association's first woman president.	President of the New York Library Association 1903–1904.
	Henry Eduard Legler	1912–1913		Secretary, Wisconsin Library Commission, 1904–1909. Librarian, Chicago Public Library, 1909–1917. Curator, Wisconsin Historical Society
	Edwin Hatfield Anderson	1913–1914	Also served as treasurer, 1895–1896	Director of the New York Public Library, 1909–1934.
	Hiller Crowell Wellman	1914–1915		Librarian for the Springfield (Massachusetts) City Library from 1902- 1948.
	Mary Wright Plummer	1915–1916		Member of the first class taught by Melvil Dewey at the Columbia College School of Library Economy, 1887.
	Walter Lewis Brown	1916–1917	Created the ALA War Service Committee 1917.	Director of the Buffalo, NY Public Library, 1906–1931; President of the New York Library Association, 1906.
	Thomas Lynch Montgomery	1917–1918		Founded the Pennsylvania Library Club, 1890. Established the first branch of the Philadelphia Free Library, 1892.
	William Warner Bishop	1918–1919		Director University of Michigan Library, 1915–1941, reorganized Vatican Library and archives, President of the Bibliographical Society of America
	Chalmers Hadley	1919–1920	Also served as secretary, 1909–1911.	Director, Denver Public Library,1911–1924. Director Public Library of Cincinnati and Hamilton County, 1924–1945.
	Alice S. Tyler	1920–1921		Dean of the School of Library Science at Western Reserve University, 1912–1929
	Azariah Smith Root	1921–1922	Founding member of the ALA College Library Section, 1899.	Director, Oberlin College Library, President of the Bibliographical Society of America
	George Burwell Utley	1922–1923	Also served as secretary, 1911–1920.	First director of the first tax supported public library in the state of Florida, Jacksonville Public Library, 1905.
	Judson Toll Jennings	1923–1924		Director of the Seattle Public Library, 1907–1942.
	Herman H. B. Meyer	1924–1925		Initiated the Library of Congress services for the blind,President of the Bibliographical Society of America
	Charles F. D. Belden	1925–1926		Director of the Boston Public Library, 1917.
	George H. Locke	1926–1927		Chief Librarian at Toronto Public Library, 1908–1937.
	Carl B. Roden	1927–1928	Also served as treasurer, 1910–1920.	Chief librarian of the Chicago Public Library, 1918 to 1950, President of the Bibliographical Society of America
	Linda A. Eastman	1928–1929		Founding member and later president of the Ohio Library Association.
	Andrew Keogh	1929–1930		Librarian at Yale University, President of the Bibliographical Society of America
	Adam Strohm	1930–1931	Pioneer of adding branch libraries	Director Detroit Public Library, 1912–1941
	Josephine Adams Rathbone	1931–1932		Director, Pratt Institute Library School.
	Harry Miller Lydenberg	1932–1933	Director of the Board of International Relations of the American Library Association, 1943–1946.	Director of New York Public Library, 1934–1941, President of the Bibliographical Society of America.
	Gratia A. Countryman	1933–1934		Director of Minneapolis Public Library, 1904–1936. President of the Minnesota Library Association,1904–1905.
	Charles H. Compton	1934–1935	Library War Service	Director, St. Louis Public Library, 1938–1950.
	Louis Round Wilson	1935–1936		Dean, University of Chicago Graduate Library School
	Malcolm Glenn Wyer	1936–1937	Library War Service	President, Iowa Library Association, Nebraska Library Association, Colorado Library Association
	Harrison Warwick Craver	1937–1938		Director, Carnegie Library of Pittsburgh
	Milton James Ferguson	1938–1939	Appointment of Librarian of Congress Committee 1937-1939	President Oklahoma Library Association; State Librarian of California, President, California Library Association, Chief Librarian of the Brooklyn Public Library, President, New York Library Association.
	Ralph Munn	1939–1940		Director, Carnegie Library of Pittsburgh, 1928–1964. Pennsylvania Library Association President, 1930–31
	Essae Martha Culver	1940–1941		First state librarian of Louisiana
	Charles Harvey Brown	1941–1942	Founder, Association of College and Research Libraries	Director, Iowa State University Library 1922- 1946
	Keyes D. Metcalf	1942–1943		Director of University Libraries at Harvard- 1937–1955.
	Althea H. Warren	1943–1944	Director of the American Library Association, National Defense Book Campaign.	President, California Library Association, 1921; Director of the Los Angeles Public Library, 1933-1947
	Carl Vitz	1944–1945		Director, Public Library of Cincinnati and Hamilton County, 1946–1955
	Ralph A. Ulveling	1945–1946		Director, Detroit Public Library, 1941–1967. President, Michigan Library Association, 1937–1938.
	Mary U. Rothrock	1946–1947		Supervised the Tennessee Valley Authority libraries from 1934 to 1948; president of the Tennessee Library Association
	Paul North Rice	1947–1948		U.S. Army World War I, Director of the New York University Libraries, Executive Secretary of the Association of Research Libraries
	Errett Weir McDiarmid	1948–1949	Wrote The Administration of the American Public Library published by ALA.	University Librarian of the University of Minnesota.
	Milton E. Lord	1949–1950		Director of university libraries and library school University of Iowa. Director of the Boston Public Library.[3]
	Clarence R. Graham	1950–1951	President Southeastern Library Association	Director, Louisville Public Library, 1942–1977.
	Loleta Dawson Fyan	1951–1952		Michigan Library Association President, 1934–1935. Michigan State Librarian, 1941–1961
	Robert Bingham Downs	1952–1953		
	Flora Belle Ludington	1953–1954	Chairman of the board on International Relations, 1942–1945	Librarian, Mount Holyoke College, 1936–1964
	L. Quincy Mumford	1954–1955		Librarian of Congress, 1954–1974.
	John S. Richards	1955–1956	President, Public Library Association	Director, Seattle Public Library
	Ralph R. Shaw	1956–1957		Director of U.S. National Agricultural Library, 1940–1954. Founder of Scarecrow Press.
	Lucile M. Morsch	1957–1958		First Chief of Descriptive Cataloging Division at Library of Congress, 1940. President, District of Columbia Library Association, 1954–1955
	Emerson Greenaway	1958–1959	Chair, Intellectual Freedom Committee	Director, Enoch Pratt Free Library, Director, Free Library of Philadelphia
	Benjamin E. Powell	1959–1960	President, Association of College and Research Libraries,1948-1949.	University Librarian, Duke University, 1946–1975.
	Frances Lander Spain	1960–1961		Head of Children's Services at the New York Public Library.
	Florrinell F. Morton	1961–1962		Director of the Library School at Louisiana State University, 1944 to 1971
	James E. Bryan	1962–1963	President, Public Library Association, 1959	Director, Newark Public Library 1958-1972; President, New Jersey Library Association, 1952–1954
	Frederick H. Wagman	1963–1964	Chair, Special Committee of Five on “Goals for Action,” 1959.	Director University of Michigan Library, 1953-1982.
	Edwin Castagna	1964–1965	President of the Nevada Library Association and the California Library Association	Director of the Enoch Pratt Free Library.
	Robert G. Vosper	1965–1966	President, Association of College and Research Libraries	Director of libraries and professor, University of California, Los Angeles.
	Mary V. Gaver	1966–1967	President, American Association of School Librarians, 1957-1958	Professor at Rutgers University Library and Information Science department.
	Foster E. Mohrhardt	1967–1968	President of Association of Research Libraries,1966; Vice President of the International Federation of Library Associations and Institutions, 1965–71.	Director of the United States National Agricultural Library, 1954–1968
	Roger McDonough	1968–1969	Chair, Federal Relations Committee.	First State Librarian for New Jersey.
	William S. Dix	1969–1970	Principal author of the "Freedom to Read" statement.	Director Princeton University Library
	Lillian M. Bradshaw	1970–1971	President of the Texas Library Association	Director of the Dallas Public Library
	Keith Doms	1971–1972	President of the Pennsylvania Library Association	Director of the Carnegie Library of Pittsburgh; director of the Free Library of Philadelphia.
	Katherine Laich	1972–1973	ALA Council, 1958 and 1963–1968; ALA Executive Board,1964–1968); chair, Committee on Organization, 1961–1964; chair, Activities Committee on New Directions for ALA (ACONDA.)	Assistant City Librarian, Los Angeles Public Library; faculty member, University of Southern California, School of Library Science.
	Jean E. Lowrie	1973–1974	President of the American Association of School Librarians,1963-1964; Founder, International Association of School Librarianship- 1971; president, 1971 to 1977 and executive secretary, 1977 to 1996.	Professor and director, Western Michigan University, Department of Librarianship.
	Edward G. Holley	1974–1975	ALA Medal of Excellence 1983; Joseph W. Lippincott Award 1987; Academic Research Librarian of the Year 1988 by the Association of College and Research Libraries; Beta Phi Mu Award 1992.	Dean and professor UNC School of Information and Library Science at the University of North Carolina at Chapel Hill.
	Allie Beth Martin	1975–Apr 1976	Author- A Strategy for Public Library Change.	Director, Tulsa City-County Library, Oklahoma.
	Clara Stanton Jones	1976–1977	She was the ALA's first African-American president, serving as its acting president from April 11 to July 22, 1976, and then its president from July 22, 1976, to 1977.	Director, Detroit Public Library.
	Eric Moon	1977–1978		Editor-in-chief of Library Journal 1958-1968; chief editor of Scarecrow Press 1969-1978.
	Russell Shank	1978–1979	President, Association of College and Research Libraries	Director of Libraries of the Smithsonian Institution; Chief Librarian at the University of California - Los Angeles (UCLA)
	Thomas J. Galvin	1979–1980	Executive Director of American Library Association, 1985–1989	Director of the library at the State University of New York at Albany and a professor in the school of information science and policy, where he implemented a doctoral program.
Dr. Peggy Sullivan	Peggy A. Sullivan	1980–1981	Executive Director of American Library Association, 1992–1994	Library historian, library educator (dean and professor, University of Chicago, Northern Illinois University, Dominican University) library administrator.
	Elizabeth W. (Betty) Stone	1981–1982		Dean at Catholic University of America, School of Library and Information Science.
	Carol A. Nemeyer	1982–1983	Board of Trustees of the Freedom to Read Foundation	Associate librarian for national programs at the Library of Congress, overseeing the creation of, and gaining nationwide support for, The Center for the Book.
	Brooke E. Sheldon	1983–1984		Library administrator and librarian educator (dean of the Graduate School of Library and Information Science at the University of Texas at Austin, dean at Texas Women's University);
	E. J. Josey	1984–1985	Founder and first President of the Black Caucus of the American Library Association	Professor University of Pittsburgh School of Computing and Information
	Beverly P. Lynch	1985–1986	Executive director of the Association of College and Research Libraries	Dean of the UCLA School of Education and Information Studies and director of UCLA's California Rare Book School; University librarian at the University of Illinois at Chicago,1977-1989.
	Regina Minudri	1986–1987	President of the California Library Association	Director of the Berkeley Public Library
	Margaret E. Chisholm	1987–1988	ALA Councilor-at-Large; Member of ALA Executive Board.	Director, University of Washington, Graduate School of Library and Information Science
	F. William Summers	1988–1989	Chair, ALA Committee on Accrediation	Dean,Florida State University School of Information
	Patricia Wilson Berger	1989–1990	President, Federal Librarians Round Table	Special and administrative librarian in key federal institutions including the U.S. Patent and Trademark Office, the Environmental Protection Agency, and the National Institute of Standards and Technology.
	Richard M. Dougherty	1990–1991	Association of College and Research Libraries Academic Librarian of the Year (1983),Joseph W. Lippincott Award	Director of libraries at University of California, Berkeley and the University of Michigan.
	Patricia G. Schuman	1991–1992	Treasurer, 1984–1988. American Library Association Honorary Membership	founder and President, Neal-Schuman Publishers, 1973–2012
	Marilyn L. Miller	1992–1993	President American Association of School Librarians , 1986–1987.	Chair of the Department of Library Science and Information Studies at the University of North Carolina at Greensboro
	Hardy R. Franklin	1993–1994	Member of ALA Council; Chair of the ALA Nominating Committee	Director District of Columbia Public Library
	Arthur Curley	1994–1995	Chair, Intellectual Freedom Committee	Deputy Director, New York Public Library Research Libraries. Deputy Director, Detroit Public Library. Director, Cuyahoga County Public Library. Director, Montclair Public Library. Director, Palatine Public Library. Director, Avon Public Library.
	Betty J. Turock	1995–1996	American Library Association Honorary Membership	Dean and professor, Rutgers School of Communication and Information, Author, Envisioning a Nation Connected : Librarians Define the Public Interest in the Information Superhighway.
	Mary R. Somerville	1996–1997	President of the Association for Library Service to Children	Director of the Miami-Dade Public Library System
	Barbara J. Ford	1997–1998	American Library Association Honorary Membership, 2026; President of the Association of College and Research Libraries	Director, Mortenson Center for International Library Programs, University of Illinois at Urbana-Champaign, 2003–2014.
	Ann K. Symons	1998–1999	Also served as treasurer, 1992–1996.	
	Sarah Ann Long	1999–2000	President of the Public Library Association	Director of the North Suburban Library System (NSLS)an organization of more than 650 academic, public, school, and special libraries in the north/northwest suburbs of Chicago.
	Nancy C. Kranich	2000–2001		Editor, Libraries & Democracy: The Cornerstones of Liberty. Chicago: American Library Association, 2001
	John W. Berry	2001–2002	President of the Freedom to Read Foundation; trustee, American Library in Paris	Professor of the Practice, Dominican University.
	Maurice J. (Mitch) Freedman	2002–2003	President, Library and Information Technology Association	
	Carla D. Hayden	2003–2004	"Librarian of the Year" Award-1995.	Librarian of Congress, 2016–2025
	Carol Brey	2004–2005		
	Michael Gorman	2005–2006	President of the Library and Information Technology Association.	Dean of Library Services at the Henry Madden Library, California State University, Fresno. Author of Our Enduring Values: Librarianship in the 21st Century
	Leslie Burger	2006–2007	Established "Emerging Leaders Program" at the American Library Association. Appointed interim executive director of the American Library Association in 2023.	President of the Connecticut Library Association. President of the New Jersey Library Association.
	Loriene Roy	2007–2008	She was the ALA's first Native American president.	Professor at the University of Texas at Austin School of Information Convener on Indigenous Matters for the International Federation of Library Associations, 2008–2009
	James R. Rettig	2008–2009	President, Reference and User Services Association, ALA Executive Board	Dean of Libraries, United States Naval Academy
	Camila A. Alire	2009–2010	She was the ALA's first Hispanic/Latina American president and President of REFORMA,the National Association to Promote Library & Information Services to Latinos and the Spanish Speaking in 1993-1994.	Dean emerita at the University of New Mexico and Colorado State University
	Roberta A. Stevens	2010–2011		
	Molly Raphael	2011–2012	President, Library Leadership and Management Association (LLAMA), ALA Executive Board, ALA Councilor at Large	Director of Multnomah County Library (MCL) in Portland, Oregon.
	Maureen Sullivan	2012–2013		
	Barbara Stripling	2013–2014	President of the Freedom to Read Foundation; President of the American Association of School Librarians	Syracuse University Professor and Associate Dean. Director of school library programs in New York City. President of the New York Library Association.
	Courtney Young	2014–2015		
	Sari Feldman	2015–2016	President of the Public Library Association, Chair of the ALA Office of Literacy/Outreach Services Advisory Committee	Executive director of Cuyahoga County Public Library,
	Julie Todaro	2016–2017	President, Association of College and Research Libraries, 2007–2008.	Dean of Library Services, Austin Community College. President, Texas Library Association, 2000–2001.
	James G. Neal	2017–2018	Senior Policy Fellow, American Library Association; Melvil Dewey Medal, Joseph W. Lippincott Award, American Library Association Honorary Membership.	Vice President for Information Services and University Librarian at Columbia University; Dean of University Libraries at Indiana University and Dean Johns Hopkins University Library.
|	Loida Garcia-Febo	2018–2019	President of REFORMA, the National Association to Promote Library & Information Services to Latinos and the Spanish Speaking, 2009-2010.	IFLA Executive Board and Chair, IFLA Management of Library Associations Section.
	Wanda Kay Brown	2019–2020	President, Black Caucus of the American Library Association, 2006–2008.	First president from a HBCU (historically black college or university). C. G. O'Kelly Library at Winston-Salem State University.
	Julius C. Jefferson Jr.	2020–2021	President of the Freedom to Read Foundation, 2013–2016.	
	Patricia "Patty" Wong	2021–2022	She was the ALA's first Asian American president.	City librarian of Santa Clara, California.
	Lessa Kananiʻopua Pelayo-Lozada	2022–2023	ALA's first Native Hawaiian/Pacific Islander American president.	
	Emily Drabinski	2023–2024	ALA councillor-at-large (2017–2020), chair International Relations Committee, board Association of College and Research Libraries.	Interim chief librarian at The Graduate Center at City University of New York. Associate Professor at the Queens College Graduate School of Library and Information Studies.
Cindy Hohl	Cindy Hohl	2024–2025	First SPECTRUM scholar elected as ALA President (2016).	President of the American Indian Library Association, 2020–2021.
	Sam Helmick	2025–2026	American Library Association Executive Board.	President, Iowa Library Association
	Maria McCauley	2026–2027	President, Public Library Association. SPECTRUM scholar, 1999.	Director of Libraries, Cambridge Public Library (MA)
	Tamika Barnes	2027-2028	ALA Executive Board. SPECTRUM Scholar, 1998.	Associate dean of Perimeter College Library Services at Georgia State University
