= List of presidents of the Bibliographical Society of America =

The Bibliographical Society of America (BSA) fosters the study of books and manuscripts. It was established in 1904.

The first president was William Coolidge Lane. The first woman president was Ruth Mortimer in 1988.

Name	Term	Other accomplishments
William Coolidge Lane	1904-1909	Librarian Harvard University, 1898–1928, President American Library Association, 1898–1899.
Azariah Smith Root	1909-1910	Director, Oberlin College Library, 1890–1927. President, American Library Association, 1921–1922.
William Dawson Johnston	1910-1912	Historian of the Library of Congress, Director, Columbia University Libraries, 1909–1913.
Charles Henry Gould	1912-1913	University librarian at McGill University, president of the American Library Association, 1908–1909.
Andrew Keogh	1909-1914	Director, Yale University Library, 1916–1938, president of the American Library Association, 1929–1930.
Carl B. Roden	1914-1916	Director, Chicago Public Library, 1918–1950, President, American Library Association, 1927–1928.
George Watson Cole	1916-1921	Director of the Huntington Library
William Warner Bishop	1921-1923	President, American Library Association, 1918–1919, President, International Federation of Library Associations
Azariah Smith Root	1923-1926	Also served as BSA president, 1909–1910.
Herman H. B. Meyer	1926-1929	Library of Congress in several positions including Chief Bibliographer, President, American Library Association, 1924–1925.
Harry M. Lydenberg	1929-1931	Director New York Public Library, 1934–1941, President, American Library Association, 1932–1933.
Lawrence C. Wroth	1931-1933	Director, John Carter Brown Library,1924-1957, author of The Colonial Printer.
Augustus Hunt Shearer	1933-1936	Director of the Grosvenor Library in Buffalo, NY, 1917–1941.
Leonard Leopold Mackall	1936-1937	President, Georgia Historical Society.
Earl Gregg Swem	1937-1938	Librarian, College of William & Mary, Earl Gregg Swem Library named for him. Bibliographer of Virginia history.
Victor Hugo Paltsits	1938-1939	Keeper of Manuscripts, New York Public Library
Randolph Greenfield Adams	1940-1941	Director, William L. Clements Library, University of Michigan
Thomas W. Streeter	1942-1943	Book collector, philanthropist, chairman, Friends Dartmouth College Library, Associate John Carter Brown Library, Council of Fellows, Pierpont Morgan Library; director, Friends Huntington Library; visiting committees Yale, Princeton, and Harvard, McGregor Library; fellow,California Historical Society; council, Grolier Club, trustee New York Historical Society, and president, American Antiquarian Society.
Robert W. G. Vail	1944-1945	Librarian, American Antiquarian Society, 1930–1939; Director, New York Historical Society, 1944–1960. Editor, Bibliotheca Americana.
William A. Jackson	1946-1947	Director Harvard University, Houghton Library of Rare Books and Manuscripts,1942-1964; Gold Medal of the Bibliographical Society, 1965.
LeRoy E. Kimball	1948- 1949	New York University comptroller; President of the Modern Language Association of America; President, New York Historical Society.
James T. Babb	1950-1952	Director, Yale University Library; Selected books for the White House at the request of Jacqueline Kennedy
Curt F. Bühler	1953-1954	Keeper of Books at the Pierpont Morgan Library; President, American Council of Learned Societies
Lawrence Clark Powell	1955	University Librarian, UCLA Library, 1944- 1961, head librarian, William Andrews Clark Memorial Library, 1944–1966, author.
John D. Gordan	1956-1957	Chief of the Berg Collection of English and American Literature New York Public Library
Donald F. Hyde	1958-1959	Bibliophile, attorney, President, Grolier Club.
Frederick Baldwin Adams Jr.	1960-1961	Director, Pierpont Morgan Library, 1948 - 1969; president, Grolier Club.
C. Waller Barrett	1962-1963	Bibliophile, shipping magnate, founder of the Barrett Library of American Literature at the University of Virginia, President American Antiquarian Society.
Herman W. Liebert	1964-1965	Librarian of the Beinecke Rare Book and Manuscript Library at Yale University.Chairman of the Yale Edition, Works of Samuel Johnson, President of the Grolier Club.
Edwin Wolf II	1966-1967	Librarian, Library Company of Philadelphia, author.
Frederick R. Goff	1968-1969	Chief of the Rare Book Division, Library of Congress, author
Robert H. Taylor	1970-1971	Bibliophile,Robert H. Taylor Collection, president, Grolier Club, the Keats-Shelley Association of America.
James J. Heslin	1972-1973	Director New York Historical Society, author.
William H. Bond	1974-1975	Librarian, Houghton Library Harvard University
Stuart B. Schimmel*	1976-1977	Book collector--"one of the great American collectors of the latter decades of the twentieth century".The Stuart B. Schimmel Collection of the Book Arts
Thomas R. Adams	1978-1980	Librarian of John Carter Brown Library, curator Van Pelt-Dietrich Library, University of Pennsylvania, author,
Marcus A. McCorison	1980-1984	Librarian, director and president American Antiquarian Society; Chief Rare Book Librarian, Dartmouth College;author
G. Thomas Tanselle	1985-1988	Professor University of Wisconsin; vice president of the John Simon Guggenheim Memorial Foundation, scholar, bibliographer, and book collector.
Ruth Mortimer	1988-1992	Curator Smith College rare books collection, named the Mortimer Rare Book Collection in her honor; curator Harvard University; author,
William P. Barlow Jr.	1992-1996	Certified public accountant and partner at Barlow & Hughan, San Francisco, Master of the Press at the Roxburghe Club, faculty of the Rare Book School.
Roger E. Stoddard	1996-2000	Houghton Library, Harvard University curator of rare books
Hope Mayo	2004-2008	Philip Hofer Curator of Printing and Graphic Arts at Houghton Library, Harvard University. (President during centenary of the BSA)
John Bidwell	2004-2008	Astor Curator and Department Head of Printed Books and Bindings, Morgan Library & Museum; Curator Graphic Arts Division, Princeton University Library; Librarian, William Andrews Clark Memorial Library, UCLA.
John Neal Hoover	2008-2011	Head of Special Collections and Rare Book Librarian St. Louis Mercantile Library Association; author.
Claudia Funke	2012-2014	Avery Chief Curator, Huntington Library, Curator Avery Architectural and Fine Arts Library, Columbia University.
Martin Antonetti	2015-2017	Director Charles Deering Memorial Library of Special Collections and University Archives at Northwestern University Library; Curator of Rare Books, Smith College; Librarian and Director of the Grolier Club.
Barbara A. Shailor	2018-2021	Director, Beinecke Rare Book and Manuscript Library, Yale University, author.
Caroline Duroselle-Melish	2022	Andrew W. Mellon Curator of Early Modern Books and Prints Folger Shakespeare Library; Assistant Curator Houghton, Harvard University, author.
Kinohi Nishikawa	2024-2026	Effron Center for the Study of America, Princeton University Professor of English and African American Studies, author
John McQuillen	2026-	Associate Curator at The Morgan Library & Museum
