= Cindy Hohl =

American librarian

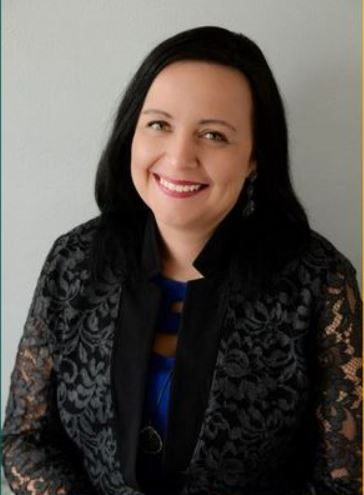

President of the American Library Association
- Incumbent
- Assumed office July 2024
- Preceded by: Emily Drabinski
- Succeeded by: Sam Helmick

Personal details
- Occupation: Librarian

Cindy Hohl was librarian at the Kansas City Public Library where she held the positions of director of Branch Operations (2017–22) and director of Policy Analysis and Operational Support (2022–25).

In 2023, Hohl was elected as president of the American Library Association for the 2024–2025 term. She previously served as the president of the American Indian Library Association and currently serves as the treasurer of the Freedom to Read Foundation.

== Early life and education ==
Cindy Hohl is a member of the Santee Sioux Nation of Nebraska.

== Career in librarianship ==
Hohl worked in marketing and communications before transitioning to a career in librarianship, in part because of the encouragement of her husband, who is also a librarian. Her first position in a library was as a customer experience manager at the Topeka & Shawnee County Public Library, where she worked from 2014 to 2017.

In April 2023, Hohl was elected as president of the American Library Association (ALA) for 2024–2025. After her election was announced, she discussed her intention to lobby against library defunding and book bans, which have significantly increased in the United States since 2021. Hohl is the second Native American to be elected president of ALA, after Loriene Roy.

From 2020 to 2021, Hohl was the president of the American Indian Library Association In that role she was a committee member on the Joint Council of Librarians of Color.

She is the co-chair of the Spectrum Scholarship Advisory Council, which recruits Black, Indigenous, and people of color to the library field. Hohl has co-chaired ALA's Working Group to Condemn White Supremacy and Fascism and has been a member of ALA's Rural, Native, and Tribal Libraries of All Kinds Committee.

Hohl is a board trustee and the treasurer of the Freedom to Read Foundation as well as serving as a standing member on the Indigenous Matters Section of the International Federation of Library Associations and Institutions.

== American Library Association presidency ==
Hohl's presidential columns were published in American Libraries,

- July, 2024 focused on the need to make sustainable decisions for the good of every living being.
- November 2024, "We All Belong: A Change in Season Brings Inspiration and Action" celebrated Library Card Sign-Up Month.
- January 2025, "Our Winter Count: With the New Year, Let’s Honor Those who Protect the Human Spirit," reflected on the profession's aim to uplift humanity.
- March 2025, "Spectrum of Leadership: Finding Ways to Embrace Change—for Ourselves and Others" respected the resilience we gain by how we respond to changes.
- May 2025, "Information Warriors, Unite"asked librarians to defend access to accurate information for the public good.
- June 2025, "Honoring Spirits Recognizing Wisdom, Hope, and Service," recognized those who had encouraged and supported her—the true helpers of society.

During Hohl's presidency the American Library Association brought a lawsuit to block the Trump Administration's dismantling of the Institute of Museum and Library Services. On May 1, 2025 a Federal Court issued a temporary restraining to halt the dismantling.

Hohl's statement on the termination of Librarian of Congress, Carla Hayden noted, "Dr. Hayden has exceeded the greatest expectations of the many advocates who endorsed her nomination in 2016, when ALA wrote that Dr. Hayden 'understands what a library at its best is and can be for every community of users – young and old, corporate and individual, rich and poor, "connected" or not – in our diverse and complicated country.'
