= William S. Dix =

American scholar and librarian

President of the American Library Association
- In office 1969–1970
- Preceded by: Roger McDonough
- Succeeded by: Lillian M. Bradshaw

Personal details
- Born: William Shepherd Dix; November 19, 1910
- Died: February 23, 1978 (aged 67)
- Education: University of Virginia; University of Chicago
- Occupation: Librarian

William Shepherd Dix (November 19, 1910 – February 23, 1978) was a scholar and librarian who had a 22-year career as Librarian at Princeton University in New Jersey, without a degree in library science. His contributions to the field of librarianship, however, are varied and notable, making him worthy of recognition in the American Libraries' 100 most important figures.

== Education and early career ==
Dix received his bachelor's degree from the University of Virginia in 1931 and his M.A. in English from that same university a year later. He began his career at the Darlington School for Boys in Georgia, where he taught English for seven years. He taught at several other schools, eventually landing at Harvard University, where he taught for a year while finishing his doctorate in American literature at the University of Chicago.

In 1947, Dix became an English instructor at the Rice Institute (which is now Rice University) in Houston, Texas. A year later, he accepted the additional responsibilities of directing the school's library. By the time he left Rice in 1953 to head the library at Princeton University, Dix was an associate professor of English and librarian. Some of Dix's most notable contributions to the field of librarianship were during his 22 years at Princeton, culminating in his service as president of the ALA from 1969 to 1970.

== McCarthy era ==
Dix was a staunch advocate for intellectual freedom and stoutly opposed censorship. These beliefs were especially pertinent during the early Cold War years when Senator Joseph McCarthy was exploiting the fear of communism and calling for censorship of communist propaganda from American libraries and from libraries across the world.

=== IFC ===
From 1951 to 1953, Dix was chairman of the Intellectual Freedom Committee (IFC), a committee within the American Library Association (ALA) whose purpose was, and continues to be, to protect the rights of people who use libraries. While he was chairman, there was a debate among professionals in the field of librarianship about whether to censor materials that were deemed to promote communism, or that were anything but anti-communism. A sizeable number or people, led by Ralph Ulveling, felt that materials that were anything but anti-communism should be labeled, so that people were aware of their contents. Others felt that the labeling of materials was, in a way, censoring them. The IFC, with Dix as chairman, agreed with the latter group and decided that library users should have a choice as to what they read. Library collections should offer a variety of perspectives (whether they are pro or anti-communism) and allow patrons to decide what they thought about it.

=== The Freedom to Read ===
Shortly after this decision, to assuage the fears librarians across the country still felt, Dix and IFC Executive Secretary Paul Bixler began planning a conference to formulate a statement that later became known as The Freedom to Read. This statement, of which Dix was the principal author, was adopted by the ALA and the American Book Publishers Council (now known as the Association of American Publishers) on June 25, 1953, and unequivocally states that "the ordinary individual, by exercising critical judgment, will select the good and reject the bad. We trust Americans to recognize propaganda and misinformation, and to make their own decisions about what they read and believe." This statement was subsequently endorsed by twenty-one other organizations, including the Freedom to Read Foundation and the National Coalition Against Censorship.

== International work ==
As a direct result of his work with the IFC, Dix's next career move was as a member of the United States Commission to UNESCO in 1955. In the following years, Dix became one of the better traveled librarians from the United States. He also chaired the ALA's International Relations Committee from 1955 to 1960.

== Centralized Cataloging ==
Dix's commitment to the Association of Research Libraries included terms as executive secretary (1957–1959) and president (1962–1963). Dix was chairman of the Association of Research Libraries' Shared Cataloging Committee. He was instrumental in shaping the Library of Congress' international program of centralized cataloguing and testified before congressional committees in 1965 and 1967 on the need for centralized cataloguing as opposed to the then-current system in which each library catalogued new books using its own sometimes idiosyncratic system.

== President of the ALA ==
During Dix's time as president of the ALA, there was a lot of controversy on the direction that the ALA should take. According to Raber, people wanted more member participation and they wanted the ALA to take stands on social issues (particularly against the Vietnam War). From these requests came the resolution establishing the Activities Committee on New Directions for the ALA (ACONDA), which was passed on June 25, 1969, with the support of Dix. This committee, whose members consist of ALA leadership and general members, studies issues and recommends changes for the direction of the new ALA. The final report of ACONDA, finished in 1970, resulted in a chaotic debate. Ultimately, ACONDA resulted in relatively minor changes within the ALA structure, and by 1972 it was back to business as usual. But this was a time in which the ALA was challenged; it was somewhat tumultuous and chaotic, and Dix presided over it all.

== Legacy ==
During his twenty-two years at Princeton, William Shepherd Dix wrote the bulk of The Freedom to Read Statement, attended numerous international conferences and was president of the ALA while publishing numerous articles and books. His hard work resulted in his recognition as one of the top 100 most important figures in librarianship. He was honored by the American Library Association with the Dewey Medal (1969), the Joseph W. Lippincott Award in 1971 and American Library Association Honorary Membership in 1978.

Non-profit organization positions
Preceded by Roger McDonough	President of the American Library Association; 1969–1970	Succeeded by Lillian M. Bradshaw
