= Foster E. Mohrhardt =

American librarian (1907–1992)

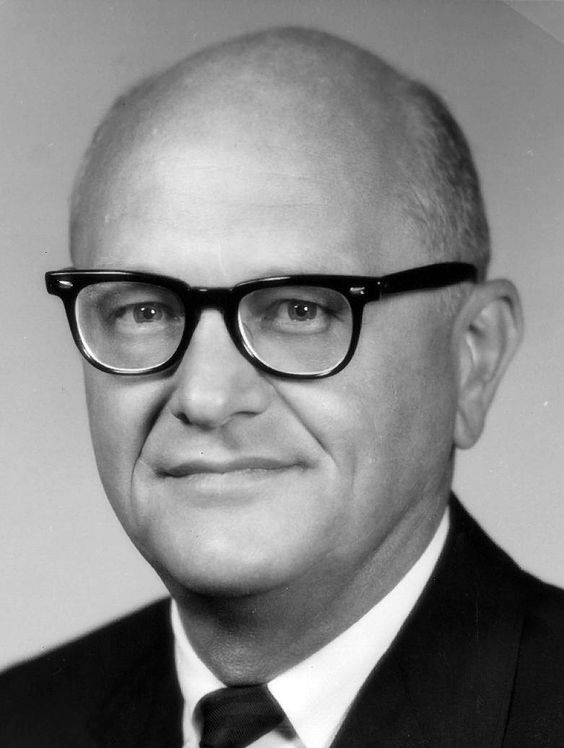

President of the American Library Association
- In office 1967–1968
- Preceded by: Mary V. Gaver
- Succeeded by: Roger McDonough

Personal details
- Born: Foster Edward Mohrhardt; March 7, 1907 Lansing, Michigan, United States
- Died: June 7, 1992 (aged 85) Arlington, Virginia, US
- Education: Michigan State University; Columbia University; Ludwig-Maximilians-Universität München; University of Michigan
- Occupation: Librarian

Foster Edward Mohrhardt (7 March 1907 – 7 June 1992) was a United States librarian. He had a long and illustrious career in library and information science as a scholar, organizer and diplomat, and was listed by American Libraries among "100 Leaders we had in the 20th Century". Mohrhardt is also known for his work to have the United States Department of Agriculture Library re-designated as a national library.

== Early life ==
Foster E. Mohrhardt was born in Lansing, Michigan, on 7 March 1907, to Albert Mohrhardt and Alice (Bennet) Mohrhardt. He attended high school in Lansing and earned a Bachelor of Arts degree in English from Michigan State College (now Michigan State University). While at Michigan State College he worked as a student stack assistant and was assistant to the librarian from 1928 to 1929. He went on to earn a Bachelor of Science degree in Library Service in 1930 from Columbia University. While there, he worked as a general assistant in the New York Public Library. In 1931, he returned to Michigan and worked in the library at the University of Michigan while he completed a Master of Arts degree in English and Library Service. During that time he earned a diploma from the Ludwig-Maximilians-Universität München in 1932, while also taking courses at other universities as a special student (including North Carolina, New York, Purdue, and Indiana Universities). While at the University of Michigan, Mohrhardt met Dr. William Warner who would go on to become his mentor and he would marry Katherine Selina Kivisto in 1936, whom he also met during his time there. They had two children, a son David and a daughter, Katri.

Following his master's degree, Mohrhardt began his career as assistant librarian and faculty member at Colorado State College of Education in 1933. By 1934, he would move back to New York to work in the Business Library at Columbia University. When William Warner became chairman of the Carnegie Corporation of New York he hired Mohrhardt to assist him with a project that would produce a bibliography published by the American Library Association (ALA) in 1937 called A List of Books for Junior College Libraries. During this time he traveled throughout the United States meeting various library and education representatives of junior college with the purpose of compiling a list of books beneficial to those institutions. Through his travels he would gain expertise in library evaluation which he would draw on and publish about throughout his career. From 1938 until 1946, Mohrhardt would become librarian of Washington and Lee University in Virginia. During his tenure there he was responsible for completing renovations to the Library building as well as developing special collections.

== Military career ==
During World War II, the Library of Congress was interested in protecting some of its more valuable collections and Mohrhardt offered surplus space available at Washington and Lee University for this purpose. During the war Mohrhardt performed military service in the U.S. Army Air Force, U.S. Navy and was involved in civilian duty. During this time he moved often, was stationed at Fort Lee for army service in 1942, then went to Indianapolis as a civilian instructor in electronics (during his education Mohrhardt received some training from General Electric) and aircraft turrets; in 1943 and 1944, he was involved in radar work for the Navy.

In 1946, he began as assistant and was then promoted to chief of the Library and Report Division of the Office of Technical Services at the Department of Commerce. The OTS was established in 1945 as the Office of Declassification and Technical Services and was re-designated the next year. The OTS was responsible for processing materials coming from Germany and other countries, as well as U.S. Military documents. Processing involved indexing and listing of the materials, and sometimes translations; the documents were then appraised for their value to the public and private sector and made widely available, where appropriate. Due to the volume of materials, it encouraged the development and application of mechanization as well as new automated techniques for information handling

== Library and leadership roles ==
In 1947, Mohrhardt would leave OTS to work as a contact consultant at Brookhaven National Laboratory of the Atomic Energy Commission. During this time he was also a visiting professor at Columbia University, where he taught courses in library management and collection development. In 1948, Mohrhardt briefly took the position of assistant to the director of the 450 libraries of the Veterans Administration, but he became director soon after. From 1948 to 1954 his responsibilities included 450 collections located domestically and overseas. He focused his efforts while there on reorganizing the library to achieve a more centralized administration. During his time there he developed a central acquisitions and cataloging system that increased the direct services the center provided to the VA libraries around the country. He established a reputation for skillfully organizing and streamlining the procurement and cataloging systems that endeared him for assignment to the U.S. Department of Agriculture Library.

Secretary of Agriculture Orville Freeman signing Memoranda 1492 with Foster Mohrhardt looking on

In 1954 as Ralph R. Shaw was leaving the USDA library, he recommended Mohrhardt as his replacement and with his reputation at the VA, Mohrhardt was confirmed as director on 7 September 1954. Mohrhardt served as director of the U.S. Department of Agriculture Library until his retirement from federal service in 1968. Mohrhardt would immediately spearhead re-designating the library as National Library. In 1957 he would publish an article about the history of the library highlighting the library's growth as it had taken up the task of acquiring all information about agriculture that was obtainable, as it was assigned at its creation. He recognized that library had essentially served as a national library since its creation saying, "It is a national library because the Department has always worked to bring agricultural information directly to the people." As he had outlined the work of the library and its responsibilities - both nationally and internationally, he suggested that services of the library were comparable to those of the Library of Congress. In 1962, Secretary of Agriculture Orville L. Freeman would designate the library as a National Library with Memoranda 1492. Preemptively, in hopes of better serving this new role, Mohrhadrt reorganized the library into four departments: Public Services, Technical Services, Field and Special Services, and Management Services. These changes to the library streamline technical services and along with the designation, enabled them to expand the service obligations beyond the USDA and strengthen cooperation with the land-grant colleges and universities, as well as with international libraries. In 1966, after working to create a network of agricultural libraries which implemented new cooperative arrangements in order to fill service gaps, the library shifted to using the Library of Congress Subject Headings. This shift accompanied by the publication of the Dictionary Catalog of the National Agricultural library, which included the entire card catalog of the NAL's collection through 1965.

During his time with the USDA library Mohrhardt frequently participated in scientific information conferences and organizations and placed importance on taking part in governmental information planning activities. In 1958, he represented the Department of Agriculture in U.S. Senate hearings on the Science and Technology Act of 1958 and spoke on the cooperation among the national libraries. In 1960, Administrative Assistant Secretary of the USDA, R.S. Roberts, nominated Mohrhardt to represent the USDA on the U.S. National Committee for the International Federation of Documentation (FID), sponsored the National Academy of Science's National Research Council. Mohrhardt would go on to be renominated, serve as national delegate twice to the international meetings of FID and even served as chair in 1965. He would use his role in FID to help arrange formal cooperation between FID and the International Federation of Library Associations (IFLA). Mohardt would also go on to represent the USDA to the Federal Council for Science and Technology's Committee on Scientific and Technical Information (COSATI) and he would later represent both the USDA and the library on the Board of the Association for Research Libraries. He would retire from the National Agricultural Library in January 1968, a year prior to the opening of the new building in Beltsville, Maryland which he had successfully championed for and three years before the laugh of AGRICOLA (AGRICultural OnLine Access), an electronic publication of the Bibliography of Agriculture which was under development during his directorship. After his retirement, Mohrhardt served as a program officer at the Council on Library Resources until September 1975, while there he focused on increased library cooperation and development of international library resources.

== Associations ==
During Mohrhart's time at the National Agricultural Library he was an active member of numerous associations and commissions. In 1955, Mohrhardt would help found the International Association of Agricultural Librarians and Documentalists (IAALD); he would serve as first president and hold the position for three terms - spanning almost 15 years. He served on the boards of directors, advisory and editorial boards, committees, and served as chair for many organizations. Of note: Science and Information Council of the National Science Foundation; Executive Board and Chairman of the US National Committee for the International Federation for Documentation of the National Academy of Sciences and the National Research Council; the Committee on Scientific and Technical Information for the Federal Council for Science and Technology, Executive Office of the President, vice-president of the American Association for the Advancement of Science - the first librarian to serve on the board and co-founder and chairman of its Section T, Information and Communication. He also served as: President of Association of Research Libraries, 1966; President of the American Library Association, 1967–68; Vice President of the International Federation of Library Associations, 1965–71; President of the National Federation of Science Abstracting and Indexing Services, 1964–65. Mohrhardt also served in similar roles in international organizations related to both the sciences and the library and information field. He was a delegate to many international meetings representing the U.S. and the various organizations he was a part of.

Outside of these organizations, Mohrhardt was also heavily involved with scientific information exchange and library education in Asia. In 1957, he was a delegate to a meeting on International Exchange of publications in the Indo-Pacific area in Tokyo, Japan; which led to him helping develop the librarian training program for Japan's National Diet Library. In 1961 he was the U.S. delegate to the Pacific Science Congress in Hawaii, and he assisted with beginning cooperative projects there with Japanese scientists. He worked extensively in cooperation with the National Diet Library and led multiple scientific and library-related activities in Japan. His contribution would be acknowledged in 1979, when we was awarded the Merit Third Class of the Order of the Rising Sun. With his work with Japan, and other international organizations, particularly the International Federation of Library Associations, he demonstrated his reputation as an international diplomat. This can be characterized by one incident that occurred during a board meeting when an Eastern-bloc representative became distraught at the course of dialogue. Mohrhardt reportedly left the room and returned with a flower for the woman and was able to defuse the tense situation with his charm.

== Legacy and awards ==
Morhardt died on 7 June 1992, in Arlington, Virginia. He experienced a long and productive career, both nationally and internationally, he was a prolific writer and speaker and received many accolades during his career and beyond his death. He was the recipient of multiple awards and honors:

- Distinguished Service Award of the USDA in 1963 "For unusual vision, competence, and accomplishment in evolving and promoting a dynamic agricultural library program for the Department and the Nation, and for exceptional international professional leadership"
- Honorary Doctor of Laws degree in 1967 from Kalamazoo College, Michigan - in recognition of his outstanding contributions to the field of librarianship.
- Appointed Fellow of the American Association for the Advancement of Science
- Appointed Fellow of the Institute of Information Scientists in London

He transformed the National Agricultural Library into an institution that could provide services nationally and internationally to the agricultural and scientific community and ultimately enabled the library to stand with the Library of Congress and the National Library of Medicine as field leaders and key institutions within their discipline fields. He saw the importance of global information sharing and used his career to foster relationships within the US government and abroad to encourage and reflect that belief. He was able to see beyond the borders of his own nation and worked with people from around the world productively in order to ensure that knowledge was shared to the benefit of everyone.

== Publications and further reading ==
- Foster E. Mohrhardt Papers, 1964–1975; archive collection of correspondence, minutes and reports held in the ALA Archives at the University of Illinois
- Foster Edward Mohrhardt papers, 1934–1968; archive collection of published papers, speeches, studies, book reviews, and biographical articles at the National Agricultural Library
- Foreign Library Periodicals; A Bibliographic Record of Current Library Periodicals in All Countries Except the United States, Canada, and the British Isles (1935) Manuscript prepared for the School of Library Service, Columbia University
- A list of books for junior college libraries. [A Bibliography] (1937) Compiled for the Carnegie Corporation
- Junior College Library Budgets (1938) from The Junior College Journal
- VA Libraries Reach From Ocean to Ocean (1951) from Library Trends
- National Systems (1953) from Library Trends
- Federal Library Systems; Their Development and Trends (1953)
- A Librarian Looks At Documentation (1956) from Special Libraries
- The Library of the United States Department of Agriculture (1957) from The Library Quarterly
- Critique On Developments in the Mechanization of Information Systems (1958) from College and Research Libraries
- The International Association of Agricultural Librarians and Documentalists: Cooperation in Serving Scientists (1961) from the Tenth Pacific Science Congress, Section of Scientific Information
- Current Status of Written Communications (1961) from Biological Abstracts
- IAALD International Library (1962) from IAALD Quarterly Bulletin
- Guides to Information Sources in Science and Technology: Space Science and Technology (volume 1) (1963) Edited with Bernard Fry
- The Flow of Scientific Information (1963) Paper presented at the Annual Conference of the American Association of Agricultural College Editors
- Guides to Information Sources in Science and Technology (1965) Edited with Bernard Fry
- Special Libraries, Pioneers in Documentation (1965) from Special Libraries
- Current Developments in the Communication of Scientific Information in the United States (1966) from ASLP Bulletin
- Librarianship and Documentation: Relationships in the United States (1966) Paper presented at the 32nd session of the IFLA General Council (later published in Libri)
- Personnel Administration in Libraries (1966) 2nd edition "Revised and largely rewritten by Foster E. Mohrhardt" (Kathleen B. Stebbins was the original author)
- The Emergent Library: Hybrid or Sport? (1966) from Garden Journal
- Libraries and People: 40 Years of Library Development (1967) from Oklahoma Librarian
- Meeting National and International Library Needs (1967) from the Schwing Library Lecture Series No. 9
- A National Network of Biological-Agricultural Libraries (1967) from College and Research Libraries (written with Blanche L. Oliveri)
- Science Abstracting Services - Commercial, Institutional, and Personal (1968)
- Report of the Second American Library Association Delegation to Japan, September 1–21, 1968 Report for the American Library Association
- From Quarterback to Wide Receiver: Observations on Foundations and Libraries (1969)
- Reading in a Changing World: Papers Presented at the 38th Session of the IFLA General Council, Budapest (1972)
- International Library and Information Service Developments As They Relate to the National Commission on Libraries and Information Science (1974)
- The Touch of Time - Observations on Foundations and Libraries (1975) Conference Publication for IFLA
- USA librarians and the IFLA (1977) in IFLA's First Fifty Years: Achievement and Challenge in International Librarianship (edited by W.H.R. Koops and J. Weider)
- National Planning for Library and Information Services Written with Carlos Victor Penna

Non-profit organization positions
Preceded by Mary V. Gaver	President of the American Library Association; 1967–1968	Succeeded by Roger McDonough
