= Allie Beth Martin =

American librarian

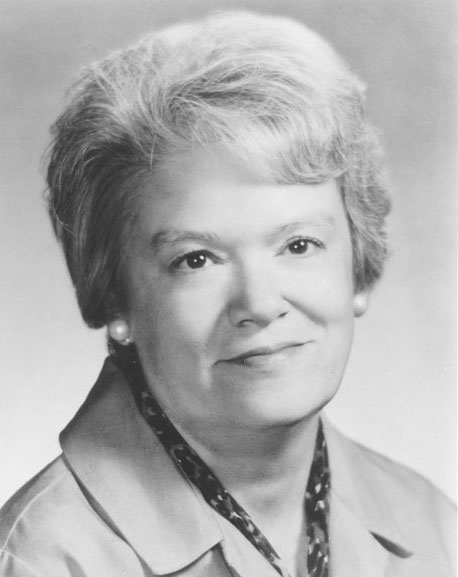
- Martin c. 1970

President of the American Library Association
- In office 1975–1976
- Preceded by: Edward G. Holley
- Succeeded by: Clara Stanton Jones

Personal details
- Born: Allie Beth Dent; June 28, 1914; Lawrence County, Arkansas, US
- Died: April 11, 1976 (aged 61); Tulsa, Oklahoma, US
- Spouse: Ralph F. Martin (m. 1937)
- Education: Arkansas College; Peabody College; Columbia University
- Occupation: Librarian

Allie Beth Martin (née Dent; June 28, 1914 – April 11, 1976) was an American librarian, educator, politician, and author. In 1990, she was named one of the 100 most influential people in the field of library science by American Libraries. She was the first director of the Tulsa City-County Library, from 1963 until her death, and was known for her ground-breaking library improvement programs.

== Early life ==
Martin was born in Annieville, Arkansas, on June 28, 1914, to Carleton Gayle Dent and Ethel (McCaleb) Dent. After graduating from high school in 1932, she went on to earn several degrees. She earned a B.A. in foreign languages & English from Arkansas College in 1935 and a B.S. in Library Science in 1939 from Peabody College. She later earned an M.S. in Library Science in 1949 from the Columbia University School of Library Service.

She married Ralph F. Martin, a journalist, on October 6, 1937.

== Career ==
Martin began working in a junior college in Little Rock, Arkansas. She joined the Arkansas Library Commission as an assistant to the executive secretary. She started working at the Tulsa Library in 1949 and became the director of the Tulsa City-County Library in 1963. Later she elected president of committee in 1945 and president of the ALA in 1975. She died in Tulsa on April 11, 1976.

== Programs ==
Funded by the National Endowment for the Humanities and the Council on Library Resources in 1972, Allie Beth Martin prepared a report on whether the library meets the needs of its patrons. The report, outlined steps that libraries should take in order to transition into the 21st Century and keep up with library's changing roles in society. After doing the preliminary study, Martin wrote the book, A Strategy for Public Library Change, which sparked a movement of library improvement programs all across the country.

== Legacy and honors ==
- She was awarded an honorary Doctorate of Humanities Degree from University of Tulsa.
- The Tulsa Regional Library was named after her as well a lecture series and a national library award.
- In 1976 she was awarded American Library Association Honorary Membership.
- The Allie Beth Martin Award has been presented annually since 1979 by the Public Library Association.

Non-profit organization positions
| Preceded by Edward G. Holley | President of the American Library Association; 1975–1976 | Succeeded by Clara Stanton Jones |
