= Lillian M. Bradshaw =

American librarian (1915–2010)

Lillian Moore Bradshaw
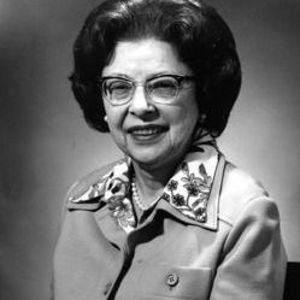

President of the American Library Association
- In office 1970–1971
- Preceded by: William S. Dix
- Succeeded by: Keith Doms

Personal details
- Born: Lillian Moore; January 10, 1915 Hagerstown, Maryland, US
- Died: February 9, 2010 (aged 95) Dallas, Texas, US
- Education: Western Maryland College; Drexel University
- Occupation: Librarian

Lillian Moore Bradshaw (January 10, 1915 – February 9, 2010) was a prominent librarian and leader in the profession. She served as director of the Dallas Public Library from 1962 to 1984 and as president of the American Library Association from 1970 to 1971.

== Early life and education ==
Born Lillian Moore in Hagerstown, Maryland, she grew up in Frederick, Maryland. She was the first in her family to attend college and graduated from Western Maryland College in Westminster, Maryland with her bachelor's degree before moving to Philadelphia, Pennsylvania to attend Drexel University's School of Library Sciences. She graduated from Drexel University in 1937.

In 1978 she received an honorary degree from Drexel, Doctor of Letters, and in 1987 she earned a Doctor of Letters in literature from Western Maryland College.

== Career ==
Bradshaw's first job in libraries was in Utica, New York, but it was at Enoch Pratt Free Library in Baltimore, where she met her husband, William "Brad" Bradshaw. In 1946, she moved to Dallas and was one of the first married women hired at the Dallas Public Library where she began her career at the Sanger Branch.

In 1961, after 16 years, she was named the first female director of a city department at the Dallas Public Library and the first woman to lead a major public library in the United States. Bradshaw worked directly with mayor of Dallas, J. Erik Jonsson, who was instrumental in his 1964 Goals for Dallas to create the Dallas Central Library; later to become J Erik Jonsson Central Library building in his honor.

According to retired Dallas City Manager, George Schrader, Bradshaw is responsible for the greatest library expansion in the history of Dallas. Bradshaw oversaw the development of 18 of the cities 25 branches, all specifically created to serve the needs of each neighborhood.

During her tenure in Dallas, Bradshaw served the profession in a number of roles including president of the Texas Library Association in 1964-1965 and the American Library Association in 1970.

== Later life and death ==
Bradshaw retired from her role as Library Director in 1984 but continued to remain active and was on the board of several civic, artistic, and educational organizations; one of which was serving on a task force to reorganize the municipal court system.

Bradshaw died on Tuesday, February 9, 2010, of natural causes in Dallas. She was 95.

== Honors and awards ==
Bradshaw served as a Trustee of the Freedom to Read Foundation and was named to their Roll of Honor in 1993.

Her work in philanthropy is responsible for the creation of the Sixth Floor Museum at Dealey Plaza which opened in February 1989.

The School of Library and Information Studies at Texas Woman’s University established the Lillian Bradshaw Endowed Chair in Library Science in 1986. Two issues of Public Library Quarterly celebrated Bradshaw's career in 1991. Contributors included Edward G. Holley and Brooke Sheldon.

Non-profit organization positions
Preceded by William S. Dix	President of the American Library Association; 1970–1971	Succeeded by Keith Doms
