= Maria McCauley =

American librarian

President-Elect of the American Library Association
- In office July 2025 – July 2026
- Preceded by: Sam Helmick

Personal details
- Education: Simmons University PhD; University of Pittsburgh MLIS; Ohio Wesleyan University BA.
- Occupation: librarian

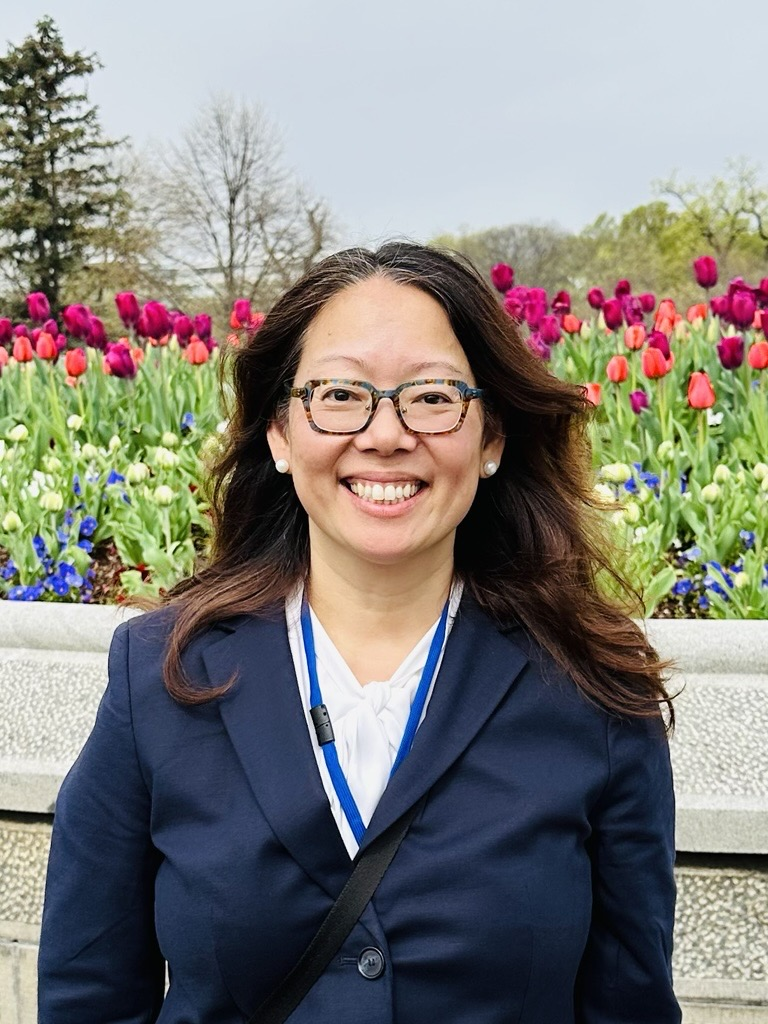
Director of Cambridge Public Libraries Maria McCauley.

Maria McCauley is an American librarian who is Director of Libraries, Cambridge Public Library, Cambridge, Massachusetts. She was elected as the 2026- 2027 president of the American Library Association.

== Education and career ==
McCauley holds a Doctor of Philosophy, Managerial Leadership in the Information Professions from Simmons University; an MLIS from University of Pittsburgh; and a BA in Theater from Ohio Wesleyan University. She also holds a Graduate Certificate in Leadership from Northeastern University and attended the Library Leadership for New Managers Program offered by the Association of Research Libraries.

She served as director of library advancement, marketing, communications at Northeastern University in Boston from 2002 to 2011; director of libraries, Somerville, Massachusetts 2011 - 2014; director of libraries, Santa Monica Public Library, California, from 2014 to 2016; and director of libraries, Cambridge Public Library, 2016 until the present.

In 2025 she gave a paper with ALA Past-President Loriene Roy at the European Conference on Information Literacy. in Bamberg, Germany.

== American Library Association ==
Prior to her election as American Library Association president, McCauley held many leadership positions in the American Library Association. She has been an ALA councilor, executive board member, and served on the fiscal and audit committee.

She was Public Library Association president in 2022–2023 and served on its executive board.

McCauley, who was a Spectrum Scholar in 1999, is a current member of ALA Core: Leadership, Infrastructure, Futures; the Public Library Association; and the Association of College and Research Libraries. She is also an active member of the Rainbow Round Table, Sustainability Round Table, Intellectual Freedom Round Table, and the International Relations Round Table.

She is also an active member of ALA Affiliate organizations: the American Indian Library Association, the Asian Pacific American Librarians Association, the Chinese American Librarians Association, the Black Caucus of the American Library Association, REFORMA: The National Association to Promote Library & Information Services to Latinos and the Spanish-speaking, and the Freedom to Read Foundation.

== Publications and presentations ==
- McCauley, Maria Taesil Hudson; Roy, Loriene (September 2025). "Family History Literacy: How We Learn from Stories of Adoption and the Indian Boarding School Experience". ECIL 2025 Book of Abstracts. European Conference on Information Literacy.
- "Representation Matters."(co-contributed with Lessa Kanani'opua Pelayo-Lozada and Patricia "Patty" Wong), American Libraries September/October 2022.
- McCauley, Maria Taesil Hudson. "A Message from PLA President Maria McCauley Regarding Recent Library Threats". Public Libraries. September/October 2022.
- Pelayo-Lozada, Lessa Kanani'opua; Wong, Patricia "Patty"; McCauley, Maria Taesil Hudson (June 2021). "Countering Anti-Asian Hate". American Libraries.
- McCauley, Maria Taesil Hudson. "Crucible Experience as an Influence of Positive Leadership in Public Libraries." PhD dissertation, Simmons University, Boston, Massachusetts, 2017.
- Carpenter, Maria Taesil Hudson (January 2012). "Cheerleader, Opportunity Seeker, and Master Strategist: ARL Directors as Entrepreneurial Leaders". College & Research Libraries. 73 (1): 11–31. doi:10.5860/crl-192.
