= Keith Doms =

American librarian

R. Keith Doms

President of the American Library Association
- In office 1971–1972
- Preceded by: Lillian M. Bradshaw
- Succeeded by: Katherine Laich

Personal details
- Born: Reihhard Keith Doms; April 24, 1920 Endeavor, Wisconsin, US
- Died: September 26, 2009 (aged 89) State College, Pennsylvania, US
- Education: University of Wisconsin–Madison; Harvard University
- Occupation: Librarian

Reihhard Keith Doms (April 24, 1920 – September 26, 2009) was an American librarian. Doms served as president of the American Library Association from 1970 to 1971 and was director of the Free Library of Philadelphia from 1969 to 1987. Born in Endeavor, Wisconsin, Doms attended the University of Wisconsin–Madison where he received degrees in French and library science.

During World War II, he served in the Army Signal Corps' Intelligence Service. The Army also sent him to Harvard University to study Mandarin.

Doms was president of the Pennsylvania Library Association in 1961.

Prior to moving to Philadelphia in 1969, Doms was assistant director and then director of the Carnegie Library of Pittsburgh. Doms served as Director of the Free Library of Philadelphia from 1969 to 1987. He was known for incorporating progressive technologies in their libraries. In a 1971 article in American Libraries, Dom stated:

"In ten years the majority of young people will be comfortable with and very much skilled in the use of both print and nonprint media… The librarians of this nation must prepare themselves and their institutions to be as fully responsive to the expectations of the next generation as is possible."

Doms also held leadership positions in Concord, New Hampshire, and Midland, Michigan. After his retirement in Philadelphia, he became Director of the Urban Libraries Council in 1987. Doms died at his home in State College, Pennsylvania on September 26, 2009.

Non-profit organization positions
Preceded by Lillian M. Bradshaw	President of the American Library Association; 1971–1972	Succeeded by Katherine Laich
