= Clara Stanton Jones =

American librarian (1913–2012)

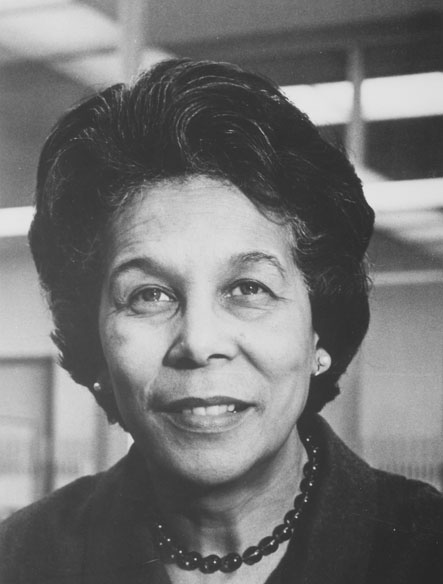
- Jones c. 1970

President of the American Library Association
- In office 1976–1977
- Preceded by: Allie Beth Martin
- Succeeded by: Eric Moon

Personal details
- Born: May 14, 1913 St. Louis, Missouri, US
- Died: September 30, 2012 (aged 99) Oakland, California, US
- Spouse: Albert DeWitt Jones
- Children: 3
- Education: University of Michigan
- Occupation: Librarian

Clara Stanton Jones (May 14, 1913 – September 30, 2012) was the first African-American president of the American Library Association, serving as its acting president from April 11 to July 22, 1976, and then its president from July 22, 1976, to 1977. Also, in 1970 she became the first African American and the first woman to serve as director of a major library system in America, as director of the Detroit Public Library.

She was awarded American Library Association Honorary Membership in 1983.

== Biography ==
=== Early life ===
Stanton Jones was born on May 14, 1913, in St. Louis, Missouri, to a close-knit, Catholic family. Her future career and impact in library science almost seemed predestined as she frequented the library at an early age. Jones recalls that she was one of the smallest patrons at the public library near her grandmother's house; she was also among very few black children at that local library. Although Jones had very little interaction with librarians in her young years, she read what interested her and selected her own materials. Her mother, Etta J. Stanton, worked as a school teacher, lecturing at public school systems until her marriage. Due to the marriage bar prohibiting married women to teach in the public school system, she taught in Catholic parochial schools to help support her family, including Clara Jones' endeavor to attend college. Jones' father, Ralph Herbert Stanton, was a manager at the Standard Life Insurance Company. He eventually accepted a position with the Atlanta Life Insurance Company, where he worked until his death. Jones grew up in a highly segregated St. Louis neighborhood, but she was not daunted by the assumed, implicit Jim Crow laws; she instead regarded her young life to be privileged with all her primary mentors being African American.

=== Education ===
Education and solidarity were heavily emphasized in Jones' family. She obtained a well-rounded education even though the St. Louis public school system was completely segregated. She grew up in an entirely African-American world, with black role-models and mentors. In high school, Jones aspired to become an elementary school teacher, even though her future salary would be slightly below white counterparts. This position would still provide a high standard of living for African Americans at that time because the income gap between white and black teachers was only slight. At 15 years old, Jones graduated from Summer High School in Atlanta, then continued her education in Wisconsin. Her home town of St. Louis was highly segregated, but instead of attending the local, tuition-free teachers college that was designated for black students, Jones attended the Milwaukee State Teacher's College in 1930; she was inspired by her older brothers' stories of college life away from home at Marquette University in Milwaukee, Wisconsin. Jones was one of only six black students at the college. She transferred to Spelman College in Atlanta, Georgia, where she majored in English and History and decided to become a librarian instead of a teacher. The president Florence Read caught notice of Jones' typing skills and offered her a position as a typist with the new Atlanta University Library; the librarians encouraged Jones to pursue a career in librarianship. She was highly receptive to their suggestions as she had already considered this career change. Jones remained in that position until her graduation; she received her Bachelor of Arts in 1934 from Spelman and a degree in Library Science in 1938 from the University of Michigan, Ann Arbor.

=== Career in Library and Information Science ===
Jones began working in libraries the same year she completed her degree in Library Science. At the beginning of 1938, she worked in a library at Dillard University in New Orleans and, by 1940, became an associate librarian at Southern University in Baton Rouge, Louisiana. Jones spent the remainder of her library career at the Detroit Public Library, retiring in 1978 as the director. She had become its director in 1970, which made her the first African American and the first woman to serve as director of a major library system in America. There was opposition to Jones' appointment as director of the Detroit Public Library, the Friends of the Library had originally offered to supplement the librarian's wages but withdrew the offer and the acting director of the Detroit Public Library and two board members resigned. However, she garnered support from the UAW and a group of community leaders, progressive businessmen, and educators, ultimately winning her the appointment. Even after her appointment, detractors tried to challenge Jones' authority by questioning her decisions, making decisions behind her back, and using degrading language. Her secretary, Carolyn Moseley, recalled how Jones never discussed these obstacles because that would affect how people perceived her. Moseley also recalled how Jones focused helping others become more successful by utilizing her power and resources on their behalf.

=== Advocacy for the ALA "Resolution on Racism and Sexism Awareness" ===
The Council of the American Library Association passed a "Resolution on Racism and Sexism Awareness" during the ALA's Centennial Conference in Chicago, July 18–24, 1976.

In May 1977, Clara Stanton Jones, then president of the American Library Association, responded to the ALA Intellectual Freedom Committee's (IFC) recommendation to rescind the ALA's "Resolution on Racism and Sexism Awareness" because its language remained unclear. Her response was published in American Libraries, the official publication of the ALA. Jones opposed the IFC's proposal, declaring that the resolution required further adjustments and amendments to the language before the committee considered annulment. The IFC feared that the resolution favored censorship as a means to purge library materials of racist and sexist language, thereby opposing the Library Bill of Rights pledge to sustain access to information and enlightenment despite content and to encourage libraries to challenge censorship.

The ALA made the decision to deliberate the fate of the resolution and report its results at the 1977 Detroit conference. Jones asserted that the resolution did not conflict with the Library Bill of Rights, and instead promoted awareness by encouraging training and outreach programs in the libraries and library schools. In agreement with the Library Bill of Rights, she advocated for more enlightenment, not repression, to combat the effects of racism and sexism in library materials. Jones viewed the resolution as the framework, and not the final solution, for enabling librarians to confront issues that hampered "human freedom". She argued, "The spirit of the 'Resolution on Racism and Sexism Awareness' is not burdened with repression; it is liberating. If the resolution is imperfect, try to make it perfect, but not by destroying it first!"

The resolution was not rescinded.

== Major achievements ==
- Jones became the director for the Detroit Public Library in 1970, making her the first African American and the first woman to serve as director of a major library system in America.
- She served as the first black president of the American Library Association from 1976 to 1977. During her presidency, she heavily aided the ALA adoption of a "Resolution on Racism and Sexism Awareness" to encourage librarians to raise the awareness of library patrons and staff to problems of racism and sexism.
- She advocated against the ALA's Intellectual Freedom Committee's recommendation to the ALA Executive Board that the "Resolution on Racism and Sexism Awareness" be rescinded. It was not rescinded.
- President Jimmy Carter appointed Jones as Commissioner to the National Commission on Libraries and Information Science in 1978. She served in this post until 1982.
- In 1984, Jones and Aileen Clarke Hernandez, former President of the National Organization for Women (NOW), founded the black women's discussion group Black Women Stirring the Waters, in the San Francisco Bay Area.
- Jones received the Trailblazer Award in 1990 from the Black Caucus of the American Library Association, the highest award given by BCALA. The award recognizes individuals whose pioneering contributions have been outstanding and unique, and whose efforts have "blazed a trail" in the profession.

=== Death ===
Jones died peacefully in her sleep on September 30, 2012, in Oakland California at the age of 99. She was survived by her three children, seven grandchildren and seven great-grandchildren.

=== Legacy ===
Jones's children Vinetta Jones, Stanton Jones, and Kenneth Jones founded the Albert D. and Clara Stanton Jones Scholarship fund in 2007 to provide scholarship assistance for University of Michigan School of Information master's students, mainly those interested in urban librarianship.

In 2018 Clara Stanton Jones was inducted into the Michigan Women's Hall of Fame in the historical category.

The American Library Association issued a Memorial Resolution Honoring Mrs. Clara Stanton Jones at the 2013 ALA Midwinter Meeting.

== Professional memberships ==
- American Civil Liberties Union
- Association for the Study of Negro Life and History
- Black Caucus of the American Library Association
- Black Women Stirring the Waters discussion group
- NAACP
- National Council of Negro Women
- Public Library Association
- Social Responsibilities Round Table of the American Library Association
- Women's International League for Peace and Freedom

== Selected publications ==
- Jones, C. S. (1974). Library service to the disadvantaged: Means and methods: a session from the 92nd Annual Conference of the American Library Association, Las Vegas, June 24–30, 1973. Phonotape. Development Digest.
- Jones, C (1977). "ALA President Views the Racism/Sexism Resolution". American Libraries. 8 (5): 244.
- Josey, E. J., & Jones, C. S. (1978). The information society: Issues and answers: American Library Association's Presidential Commission for the 1977 Detroit Annual Conference. London: Oryx Press.
- Dowlin, K. E., & Jones, C. S. (1987). How to computerize your community information and referral files. Ballwin, MO: ACTS.
- Hernandez, E., Smith, E. M., & Jones, C. S. (1988). Librarians as colleagues across racial lines Strategies for action. Ballwin, Mo: ACTS.
- Jones, C. S. (1992). From grassroots Outreach makes it happen. [Chicago, Ill.]: American Library Association.
- Jones, C.S., Hernandez, E., et al. (1997). Black Women Stirring the Water, self published by the study group, Oakland California

== Additional Reading ==
Chancellor, Renate. Breaking Glass Ceilings : Clara Stanton Jones and the Detroit Public Library. Rowman & Littlefield, 2024.

Chancellor, Renate. "Clara Stanton Jones: Stirring the Waters in the Detroit Public Library." Libraries: Culture, History, and Society (2022) 6 (1): 81–101.

== See also ==
- Library science
- List of African-American firsts
- List of presidents of the American Library Association

Non-profit organization positions
Preceded by Allie Beth Martin	President of the American Library Association; 1976–1977	Succeeded by Eric Moon
