= Jean E. Lowrie =

American librarian and educator

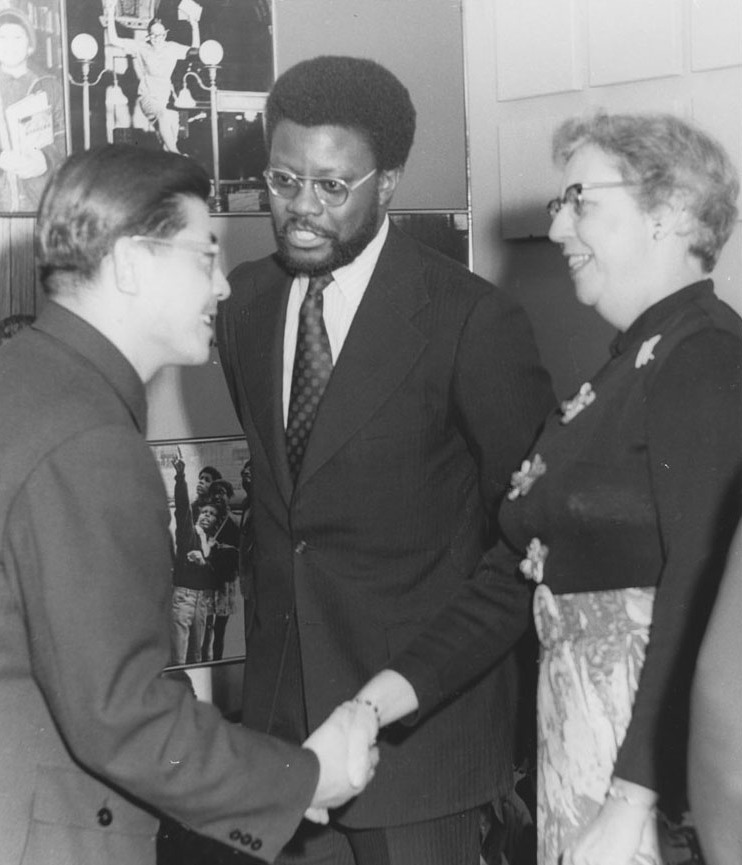
- Lowrie (right) shaking hands with Fu Feng-Kuei, an instructor at Peking Foreign Language Institute, alongside Robert Wedgeworth, Director of the ALA, during a visit by Chinese librarians to the ALA headquarters. October 18, 1973

President of the American Library Association
- In office 1973–1974
- Preceded by: Katherine Laich
- Succeeded by: Edward G. Holley

Personal details
- Born: October 11, 1918 Northville, Fulton County, New York, US
- Died: November 9, 2014 (aged 96) Stuart, Florida, US
- Education: Keuka College; Case Western Reserve University; Western Michigan University
- Occupation: Librarian

Jean Elizabeth Lowrie (October 11, 1918 – November 9, 2014) was an American librarian, educator, and president of the American Library Association from 1973 to 1974.

== Education and career ==
She received a bachelor's degree from Keuka College in 1940 and a second bachelor's degree in library science from Western Reserve University in 1941. She went on to receive a master's degree in elementary education from Western Michigan University in 1956 and her doctorate from Western Reserve University in 1959.

Her first library position was as a children's librarian in the Toledo Public Library. In 1944, she moved to Tennessee to serve as an elementary school librarian in Oak Ridge, Tennessee, where she worked until 1951.

Lowrie's next position was at Western Michigan University, where she was librarian for the Campus School, a training school for future teachers.

She became a faculty member at the WMU School of Librarianship in 1958. In 1963, she became director of the program until her retirement in 1981.

== Association leadership ==
Lowrie was President of the American Association of School Librarians from 1963-1964.

She was president of the American Library Association in 1973-1974.

Lowrie founded the International Association of School Librarianship to promote effective school librarianship and was the organization's first president from 1971 to 1977. She also served as its executive secretary from 1977 to 1996.

She also served on the executive board of the International Federation of Library Associations and Institutions.

== Honors ==
- The Jean E. Lowrie Endowment. Florida State University. 2013.
- Inaugural recipient of the American Association of School Librarians Distinguished Service Award, 1978.
- Keuka College presented her with its Professional Achievement Alumnae Award and an Honorary Doctor of Letters, 1973.
- Michigan Librarian of the year 1969.

== Publications ==
- Lowrie, Jean E.; Nagakura, Mieko (1991). Lowrie, Jean E.; Nagakura, Mieko (eds.). School Libraries: International Developments (2nd ed.). Metuchen, NJ: Scarecrow Press. ISBN 081082390X.
- Lowrie, Jean E. (1972). Lowrie, Jean E. (ed.). School Libraries: International Developments. Metuchen, NJ: Scarecrow Press. ISBN 081080526X.
- Lowrie, Jean E. (1970). Elementary School Libraries (2nd ed.). Metuchen, NJ: Scarecrow Press. ISBN 0810803054.
- Lowrie, Jean E. (1961). Elementary School Libraries. New York: Scarecrow Press.
- Lowrie, Jean E. (January 1960). "Elementary-School Libraries Today". The Library Quarterly. 30 (1): 27–36.

Non-profit organization positions
Preceded by Katherine Laich	President of the American Library Association; 1973–1974	Succeeded by Edward G. Holley
