= James Tinkham Babb =

American librarian and book collector (1899–1968)

- Born: August 23, 1899
- Died: July 21, 1968 (aged 68)
- Occupations: Librarian, book collector
- Known for: Affiliated with Yale University

James Tinkham Babb (August 23, 1899 – July 21, 1968) was an American librarian and book collector affiliated with Yale University. He was born in Lewiston, Idaho. He attended Phillips Exeter Academy and Yale College. He was a member of the Acorn Club and served as University Librarian from 1945 to 1965. He served as president of the Connecticut Library Association and councilor of the Bibliographical Society of America; he was elected to the American Antiquarian Society in 1946.

The Beinecke Rare Book & Manuscript Library was built and dedicated during Babb's tenure as University Librarian.

He and Margaret Bradley married on December 21, 1925. He had a son and daughter.

Babb died at Yale-New Haven Hospital on July 21, 1968.
