= Russell Shank =

American librarian

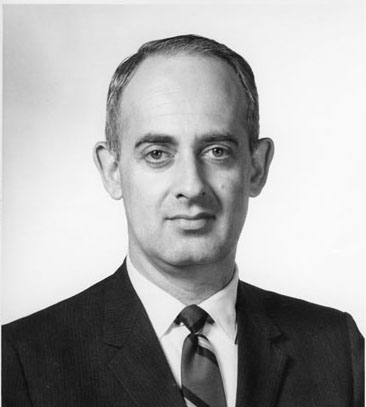
- Shank in 1968

President of the American Library Association
- In office 1978–1979
- Preceded by: Eric Moon
- Succeeded by: Thomas J. Galvin

Personal details
- Born: September 2, 1926 Spokane, Washington, US
- Died: June 26, 2012 (aged 85) Irvine, California, US
- Education: Columbia University
- Occupation: Librarian

Russell Shank (September 2, 1925 – June 26, 2012) was an American librarian. He served in the U.S. Navy during World War II earning the rank of Lieutenant Commander.

== Education ==
After military service Shank studied electrical engineering at the University of Washington and earned a bachelor's degree in electrical engineering in 1946. He went on to receive a bachelor's in librarianship in 1949, also from the University of Washington.

Shank earned a master's in business administration from the University of Wisconsin and a doctorate in library science from the Columbia University School of Library Service.

== Library career ==
Shank served as an assistant university librarian at the University of California Berkeley from 1959 to 1964 and was a member of the faculty of the Columbia University library school.

He was the first director of libraries at the Smithsonian Institution from 1968 to 1977. Among his achievements was hiring Johannes (John) Hyltoft, Chief of Conservation at the Folger Shakespeare Library, to set up and oversee the Smithsonian’s new rare book and document conservation laboratory.

In 1977, Shank was named chief librarian at the University of California - Los Angeles (UCLA) where he served until he retired from that position in 1989. Shank was also a professor emeritus in UCLA's School of Library and Information Science.

== American Library Association ==
Shank was president of two divisions of the American Library Association: the Information Science and Automation Division (1968–1969) and the Association of College and Research Libraries (1972–1973). He was elected President of the American Library Association for 1978-1979.

Shank was instrumental in forming FEDLINK (the Federal Library and Information Network). He advocated to make Article 19 of the Universal Declaration of Human Rights part of American Library Association policy.

== Awards and honors ==
- Hugh Craig Atkinson Memorial Award (1990)
- Freedom to Read Foundation Roll of Honor Award (1990)
- iSchool Distinguished Alumnus (1968)

== Death ==
Shank died after an accident at a conference of the American Library Association in 2012 and is inurned at Arlington National Cemetery.

== Selected publications ==
- Shank, Russell (1994). "Into the Future: The Foundations of Library and Information Services in the Post-Industrial Era". The Journal of Academic Librarianship. 20 (2): 100–101.
- Shank, Russell (1993). "Libraries and Librarians: Meeting the Leadership Challenges of the 21st Century". The Journal of Academic Librarianship. 18 (6): 375.
- Shank, Russell (1992). "Cultural and Technological Influences: An Introduction". Library Trends. 41 (2): 180–86.
- Shank, Russell (1991). ALA Special Committee on Library School Closings: Report. Chicago, Ill.: American Library Association.
- Shank, Russell; et al. (1986). "Privacy: History, Legal, Social, and Ethical Aspects and Privacy: Its Role in Federal Government Information Policy". Library Trends. 35 (1): 7–42.
- Shank, Russell (1983). "The Socio-Economic Environment for Regional Library Network Development". Resource Sharing & Library Networks. 1 (4): 19–26.
- Shank, Russell (1982). "New expectations from users of academic libraries". New Directions for Higher Education. 39: 25–34. doi:10.1002/he.36919823905.
- Shank, Russell (1982). "IFLA, ALA, and Issues in International Librarianship". Library Journal. 107 (13): 1299–1301.
- Shank, Russell (1979). "ALA Drafts Goals for WHCLIS to Consider". American Libraries. 10 (5): 239–42.
- Shank, Russell; Henderson, Madeline (1975). "Federal Library Cooperation". Library Trends. 24 (2): 277–92.
- Shank, Russell (1974). "Emerging Programs of Cooperation". Library Trends. 23 (2): 287–304.

== See also ==
- "Library. Library Administrative Office. Correspondence of University Librarian Russell Shank., 1977-1991". Online Archive of California. UCLA Library Special Collections, University Archives.
- Smithsonian Libraries
- University of California, Los Angeles Library

Non-profit organization positions
Preceded by Eric Moon	President of the American Library Association; 1978–1979	Succeeded by Thomas J. Galvin
