= Katherine Laich =

Former president of the American Library Association

President of the American Library Association
- In office 1972–1973
- Preceded by: Keith Doms
- Succeeded by: Jean E. Lowrie

Personal details
- Born: January 24, 1910
- Died: November 16, 1992 (aged 82)
- Education: Wilson College; University of Southern California
- Occupation: Librarian

Katherine Laich (January 24, 1910 – November 16, 1992) was a prominent librarian and leader in the profession. She served as president of the American Library Association from 1972 to 1973.

== Education ==
Laich earned her undergraduate degree from Wilson College in 1930 and her Library Science degree from the University of Southern California in 1942.

== Career ==
She worked at the Los Angeles Public Library (LAPL) in reference and related services, including at the Los Angeles Municipal Reference Library. By the 1950s and 1960s, she had advanced through LAPL’s ranks to the position of Assistant City Librarian. In that role, she participated in public events such as the groundbreaking for the Chatsworth Branch library.

In February 1970, while still at LAPL, Laich transitioned to academia when she joined the faculty of the University of Southern California School of Library Science as a lecturer (later serving in roles that included coordinator of programs). She remained affiliated with USC until her retirement.

Laich's national leadership in the American Library Association was extensive and built steadily over more than a decade. She served on the ALA Council (1958 and 1963–1968), the ALA Executive Board (1964–1968), as chair of the ALA Committee on Organization (1961–1964), and as chair of the ALA Nominating Committee (1969–1970). In 1970–1971 she chaired the Activities Committee on New Directions for ALA (ACONDA), a high-profile group that examined and proposed reforms to ALA’s structure, governance, and focus on social responsibility during a period of significant change in the profession.

She was elected ALA president for the 1972–1973 term, the organization’s highest elected office. Her presidential papers (1969–1973), now held in the ALA Archives, include correspondence, memoranda, and reports tied to her presidency and ACONDA work.

Non-profit organization positions
Preceded by Keith Doms	President of the American Library Association; 1972–1973	Succeeded by Jean E. Lowrie
