= Sam Helmick =

American librarian

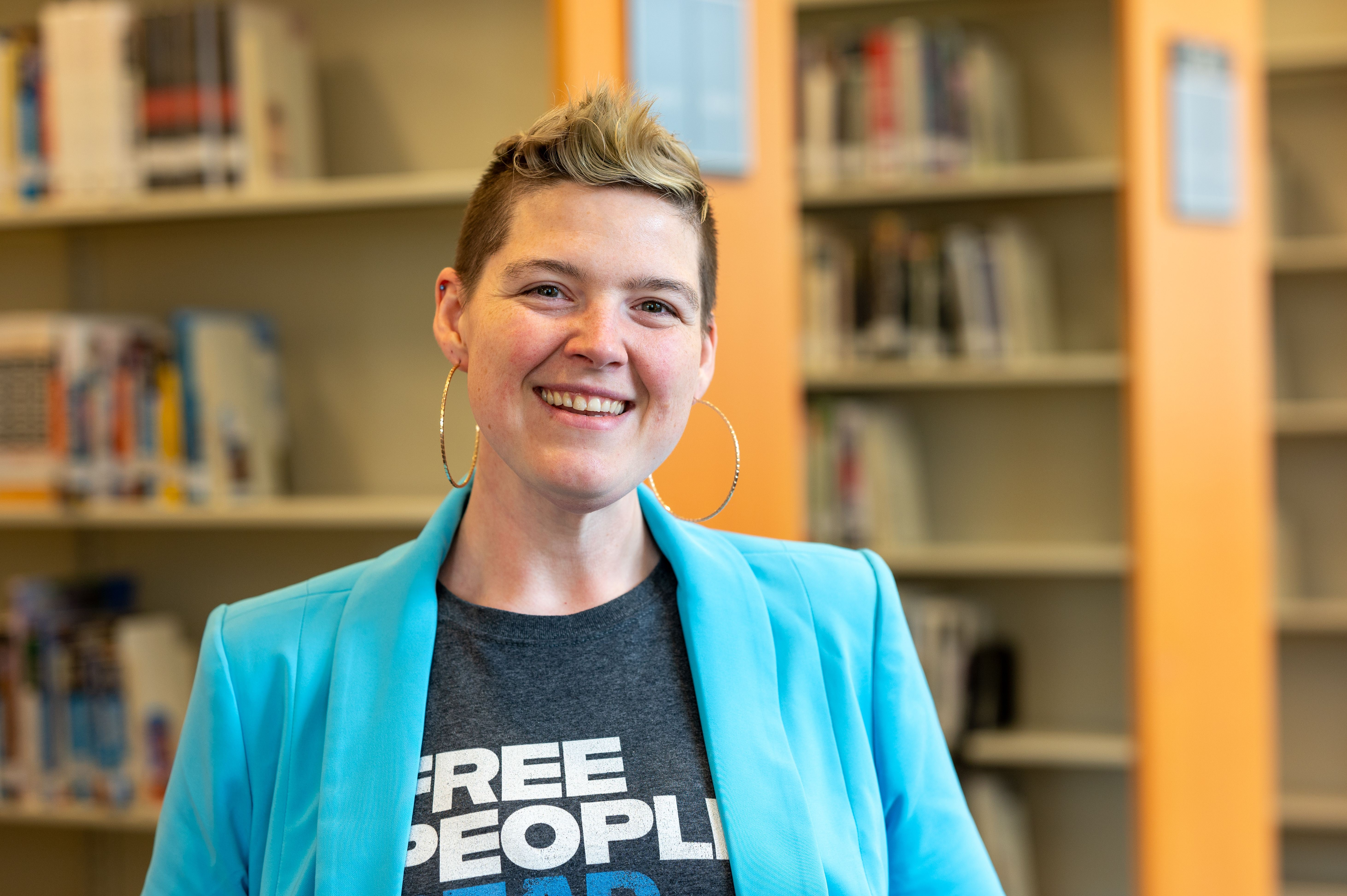

President of the American Library Association
- Incumbent
- Assumed office July 2025
- Preceded by: Cindy Hohl

Sam Helmick is the 2025–2026 president of the American Library Association. Helmick also works as a community and access services coordinator at the Iowa City Public Library.

== Education and career ==
Sam Helmick earned a Bachelor of Science in Human Services from Iowa Wesleyan University and a Master of Library and Information Science from the University of Illinois School of Information Sciences in 2012.

They have served on committees for the United States National Library of Medicine, Stonewall Book Award, Young Adult Library Services Association, and Sophie Brody Award.

Helmick was president of the Iowa Library Association in 2023 and chair of the Iowa Governor's Commission on Libraries. As president of the Iowa Library Association, they wrote to newspapers in Iowa to support a library levy.

Helmick has been active in speaking against Iowa legislation limiting library funding and against book censorship. Publishers Weekly highlighted Helmick's anti-censorship work in 2024.

== American Library Association ==
They served on the American Library Association Executive Board. They were also previously chair-elect of the ALA's Intellectual Freedom Round Table and Freedom to Read Foundation.

They were named by the ALA Council, in line with the organization's bylaws, as president-elect on July 23, 2024 after Raymond Pun stepped down in June 2024, and began serving as the ALA president in July 2025. Prior to this, Pun has received 5,611 votes, while Helmick had received 2,778 votes during the organization's election in April 2024 for the next 2025-2026 ALA president.

In August 2025, Helmick noted they are Republican, as the Trump administration aimed to withhold "some federal funding," telling Reuters "as a Republican myself, I would love to hear more from my team on this." Prior to this, Helmick had been described, by the Sioux City Journal, in February 2024, as a Republican.

As president Helmick writes for the Association's journal, American Libraries.

- "Why We Show Up." July, 2025.
- "Sustainability at Our Core." September, 2025.
- "The Pulse of Our Profession: Chapter advocacy is vital to the library’s lifeline." November, 2025.
- "Your Library Story: In a World Filled with Noise, Storytelling Stands Out." January 2026.
- "Good for Business: Cultivating strong networks and deepening community trust." March/April, 2026.
- "ALA at 150: A Celebration of Knowledge, Courage, and Community." May 2026.

In an interview at with Paul Raushenbush on the podcast, The State of Belief, Helmick emphasized their presidential theme, “Our stories are worth sharing,” and highlighted the transformative power of libraries and the need for community involvement.

Helmick wrote "Choice Requires Access" about how libraries "can affirm parental authority without diminishing professional expertise" in a guest column for The Gazette in March 2026. (Cedar Rapids, IA).

== Personal life ==
Helmick is aromantic, asexual, and non-binary. They described themselves to Publishers Weekly in April 2024 as the first "nonbinary, aromantic, asexual" president of the Iowa Library Association, and noted the organization's opposition to SF 496 in Iowa which aimed to ban books such as Gender Queer: A Memoir.
