= Gladwyn M. Childs =

American anthropologist and missionary (1896–1975)

Gladwyn Murray Childs (29 December 1896 – July 1975) was an American minister, missionary and anthropologist.

== Early life ==
He was born in Endeavor, Wisconsin on 29 December 1896. He received his bachelor's degree from Pomona College, a BD and MA from Union Theological Seminary in the City of New York, where he knew William Sloane Coffin. He obtained a PhD in anthropology from Columbia University.

== Career ==
Childs was a striking man, being 6' 4" tall. Together with his wife, Margaret, he worked as a missionary from 1925 to the early 1960s for the United Church Board for World Ministries and the American Board of Commissioners for Foreign Missions in Angola. He was the principal of a mission school, the Currie Institute in Dondi. Childs spoke both Umbundu and Portuguese at the school, which was run by the Church of Christ.

== Later life ==
After retirement, he worked for the World Council of Churches in Lisbon, but sought to return to Angola to work on a prehistoric project. Childs also worked with his uncle, Merlin Ennis, a researcher of folk tales, on Umbundu folktales; Ennis went on to publish Umbundu: folk tales from Angola in 1962.

== Personal life ==
He married Margaret (born Marguerite) Pfaffli (5 November 1902 – January 1986) in her home town of Lausanne, Switzerland on 14 February 1925. Margaret was a biologist who studied and wrote about medicinal plants in Angola. The couple had three daughters.

Their daughter, Elaine Childs-Gowell (died 2006) was a therapist, anthropologist and author.

== Publications ==
- The Ovimbundu of Angola Chicago: Field Museum of Natural History, 1934.
- Umbundu Kinship and Character: Being a Description of Social Structure and Individual Development of the Ovimbundu. ISBN 0-8357-3227-4. Published by: Oxford University Press, 1949
- 'The Kingdom of Wambu (Huambo): A Tentative Chronology' in The Journal of African History, Vol. 5, No. 3 (1964), pp. 367–379, Published by: Cambridge University Press

His papers are held at the University of Washington Library in Seattle.
