= Robert Wedgeworth =

American librarian (born 1937)

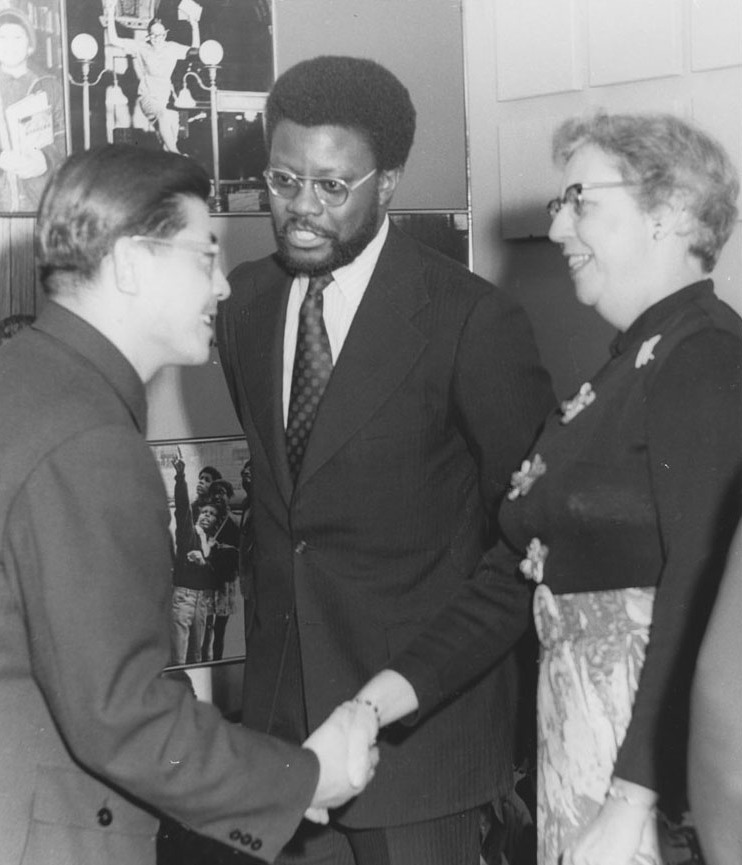
- Wedgeworth (center), alongside Jean E. Lowrie, meeting a Chinese foreign language instructor during a visit by Chinese librarians to the ALA headquarters. October 18, 1973.
- Born: July 31, 1937 (age 89); Ennis, Texas
- Education: Rutgers University
- Occupation: Librarian

Robert Wedgeworth is an American librarian who was the founding President of ProLiteracy Worldwide, an adult literacy organization. He is also a former executive director of the American Library Association, served as president of IFLA, served as dean of the School of Library Service at Columbia University, and was university librarian at the University of Illinois at Urbana-Champaign. He has also authored and edited several major reference works, and has won many awards over the course of his career. In 2021 the American Library Association awarded him Honorary Membership, its highest award.

== Education ==
After graduating from Lincoln High School in Kansas City, Missouri in 1955, Wedgeworth completed an A.B. at Wabash College, Crawfordsville, Indiana in 1959 and an M.S. in Library and Information Science at the University of Illinois in 1961. Wedgeworth joined the doctoral program in library services at Rutgers University, but left in 1972 to become the executive director of the American Library Association. In 2012, Wedgeworth returned to Rutgers, and defended and received his PhD.

After graduation, he worked in several libraries in Kansas City and St. Louis.

== Career ==
In 1962, the American Library Association selected Robert Wedgeworth as one of 75 librarians to serve as staff for "Library 21", a library of the future exhibit at the Seattle World's Fair. This experience and additional data processing training at IBM led to his appointment as Assistant Chief Acquisitions Librarian at Brown University in July 1966, with a special assignment to introduce library automation to the Brown Libraries. From 1966 to 1969, he managed all domestic and foreign acquisitions of library materials at Brown while developing an automated acquisitions and fund accounting system. As a Council on Library Resources, Inc. Fellow he toured all of Western Europe studying the book trade during the summer of 1969.

Wedgeworth moved to the Graduate School of Library Service, Rutgers-The State University of New Jersey in the fall of 1969 to do advanced studies in librarianship and teach in the graduate program.

He became Executive Director of the American Library Association (ALA) in August 1972, a position he held until 1985.

Wedgeworth went on to become Dean of the School of Library Service, Columbia University from 1985 to 1992.

After the closure of Columbia's library school, Wedgeworth served as University Librarian, Professor of Library Administration and Professor of Library and Information Science at the University of Illinois at Urbana-Champaign (UI) from November 1993 until August 20, 1999, when he retired from the university. The UI Library is the largest public university research library in the world and the third largest of all public and private university research libraries in North America after Harvard and Yale.

=== Literacy campaigns ===
Assuming the leadership of ALA during a turbulent period of internal strife, he led the effort to democratize the Association and gave it new visibility and credibility nationally and internationally. Under his leadership the Association grew from 28,000 members to over 40,000. He developed a new Headquarters building in a joint venture that more than doubled the value of its property and produced a windfall profit of more than $10 million by 2003. With the demise of the National Book Committee, Wedgeworth negotiated with the publishing industry to bring the National Library Week program to the ALA. It quickly became a nationally visible marketing tool and the third major revenue source for the Association.

His interest in reading and literacy led to his involvement in the creation of the Friends of Libraries USA and to his initiative to organize the Coalition on Literacy in 1979. He then persuaded the Advertising Council to launch the first nationwide ad campaign promoting adult literacy.

=== Copyright campaigns ===
In 1975, President Gerald R. Ford appointed Wedgeworth to the National Commission on New Uses of Copyrighted Works (CONTU) where he was influential in the resolution of library photocopying issues that were key components of the Copyright Revision Law of 1978.

From 1985 until 1992, he served as Dean of the School of Library Service, Columbia University.

At Illinois, Wedgeworth reorganized the library faculty and transformed a 1970s university library, technologically, into a 1990s university library. Under his leadership, Illinois launched a National Science Foundation sponsored digital library research program, expanded its Mortenson Center training program for foreign librarians and launched the web-based Kolb-Proust Research Archive to international acclaim. The UI Library also raised over $18 million in new endowments during his tenure, a record for a public university.

=== ProLiteracy Worldwide ===
Wedgeworth became President of ProLiteracy Worldwide in August 2002 when Laubach Literacy International (LLI) and Literacy Volunteers of America, Inc. (LVA) merged. ProLiteracy Worldwide is the largest non-governmental literacy training organization in the world, and publishes basic and advanced literacy training materials and provides literacy training through its affiliates across the U.S. and partner organizations in over 60 developing countries of Africa, Asia, Latin America and the Middle East. Wedgeworth retired as President and CEO of ProLiteracy in 2007.

=== International Federation of Library Associations and Institutions ===
After six years on the Executive Board of the International Federation of Library Associations and Institutions (IFLA), he was elected President in 1991 and re-elected in 1995 to serve until 1997. He is only the second American to be elected IFLA President and the only one to be elected to serve a second term.

During his tenure as IFLA President he led the Association to become the dominant international library and information service organization in the world, expanding its membership to over 140 countries.

He led the transformation of IFLA by introducing a global communications system (IFLANET) through the technical support of SilverPlatter and the National Library of Canada.

From 1993 in Barcelona to 1997 in Copenhagen, he presided over IFLA conferences that attracted record-breaking attendance to its programs and exhibits.

=== Board memberships ===
Currently, he serves as a member of the National Commission on Adult Literacy, a life member of the American Library Association, a life member of the National Association for the Advancement of Colored People (NAACP), a member of the Board of Trustees of both Wabash College and the Newberry Library, and a member of the Grolier Society. Previously he has served on many boards and advisory committees including advisory committees to the Princeton, Miami, Stanford and Harvard University Libraries. He recently completed twelve years as a public member of the Accrediting Council for Journalism and Mass Communication and six years as an editorial adviser to the World Book Encyclopedia.

== Writing and reference works ==
In his almost 40 years as a librarian, library educator and association executive, Wedgeworth created and edited two major reference works, ALA Yearbook, 1976–1985 and the World Encyclopedia of Library and Information Services (3 editions).

In addition, he has written and lectured widely on international librarianship, international book trade, and copyright and information policy and information technology. He has also conducted special studies of librarianship and the book trade in Western Europe, Latin America and South Africa. His publication, Starvation of Young Black Minds: The Effects of the Book Boycotts in South Africa, New York, 1989 written jointly with Lisa Drew raised serious questions about curbing the free flow of information during the struggle to combat apartheid. More recently, he produced a study of library development in South Africa, Botswana and Zimbabwe for the Carnegie Corporation of New York in 1998.

== Honors and awards ==
For his achievements Wedgeworth has received many honors and awards including six honorary doctorates, most recently from the Syracuse University in 2008.

In 1991, he was honored as the Most Distinguished Alumnus of the University of Illinois, Graduate School of Library and Information Science and in 1996 he received the Medal of Honor from the International Council of Archives for his international activities.

He was awarded the Joseph W. Lippincott Award in 1989, the Melvil Dewey Medal for professional leadership in 1997 and the Humphry/OCLC/Forest Press Award for achievements in international librarianship, and the American Library Association Honorary Membership, its highest honor, in 2021.

In 2011, Wedgeworth presented the Jean E. Coleman Library Outreach Lecture: "Literacy in Libraries: Challenges and Opportunities."

== Family ==
He and his wife, Chung-Kyun (C.K.), who is also a retired librarian, have one daughter who is an editor at the New York Times.

== Selected publications ==
- Wedgeworth, Robert (2026). Breaking Barriers: A Librarian's Story of Changing Times. New York: Bloomsbury Libraries Unlimited. p. 172. ISBN 9798216196143.
- Wedgeworth, Robert; Sharma, R.N. (2012). "1.2 from ALA to IFLA: A Primer on International Librarianship". Libraries in the Early 21st Century, Volume 2 : An International Perspective. doi:10.1515/9783110292855.17.
- Wedgeworth, Robert (2004). "The Literacy Challenge". IFLA Journal. 30 (1): 14–18.
- Wedgeworth, Robert (2001). "North American Librarianship: A Competitive Advantage". Advances in Library Administration and Organization. pp. 287–91. doi:10.1016/S0732-0671(01)80041-9.
- Wedgeworth, Robert (1998). "A Global Perspective on the Library and Information Agenda". American Libraries. 29 (6): 60–63, 65.
- Wedgeworth, Robert, ed. (1993). World Encyclopedia of Library and Information Services (3rd ed.). Chicago: American Library Association. ISBN 0-8389-0609-5.
