= Endeavor, Wisconsin =

- Village
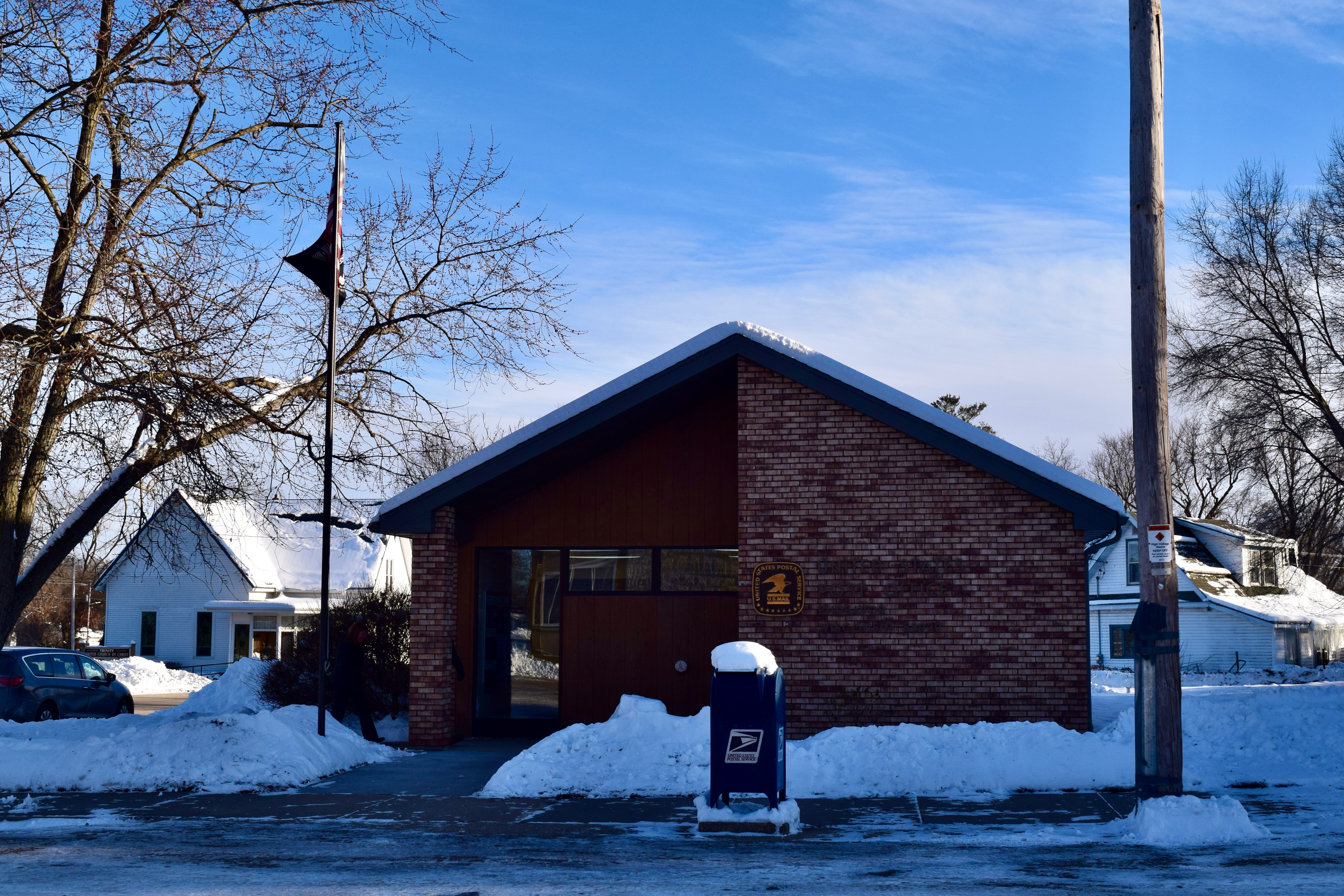
- Endeavor post office

- Location of Endeavor in Marquette County, Wisconsin
- Coordinates: 43°42′57″N 89°28′8″W
- Country: United States
- State: Wisconsin
- County: Marquette

Area
  - Total: 0.69 sq mi (1.80 km^{2})
  - Land: 0.64 sq mi (1.65 km^{2})
  - Water: 0.058 sq mi (0.15 km^{2})
- Elevation: 791 ft (241 m)

Population (2020)
  - Total: 432
  - Density: 678/sq mi (262/km^{2})
- Time zone: UTC-6 (Central (CST))
  - Summer (DST): UTC-5 (CDT)
- Area code: 608
- FIPS code: 55-24075
- GNIS feature ID: 1564647
- Website: villageofendeavor.gov

Endeavor is a village in Marquette County, Wisconsin, United States. The population was 432 at the 2020 census.

== Geography ==
Endeavor is located at 43°42′57″N 89°28′8″W (43.715813, -89.468948).

According to the United States Census Bureau, the village has a total area of 0.79 square miles (2.05 km^{2}), of which 0.73 square miles (1.89 km^{2}) is land and 0.06 square miles (0.16 km^{2}) is water.

== Demographics ==
Historical population
Census	Pop.	Note	%±
1950	314		—
1960	280		−10.8%
1970	328		17.1%
1980	335		2.1%
1990	316		−5.7%
2000	440		39.2%
2010	468		6.4%
2020	432		−7.7%
U.S. Decennial Census

=== 2010 census ===
As of the census of 2010, there were 468 people, 175 households, and 126 families living in the village. The population density was 641.1 inhabitants per square mile (247.5/km^{2}). There were 189 housing units at an average density of 258.9 per square mile (100.0/km^{2}). The racial makeup of the village was 90.2% White, 1.9% African American, 1.1% Native American, 1.9% Asian, 2.4% from other races, and 2.6% from two or more races. Hispanic or Latino people of any race were 4.5% of the population.

There were 175 households, of which 37.1% had children under the age of 18 living with them, 56.6% were married couples living together, 9.1% had a female householder with no husband present, 6.3% had a male householder with no wife present, and 28.0% were non-families. 20.6% of all households were made up of individuals, and 4.5% had someone living alone who was 65 years of age or older. The average household size was 2.67 and the average family size was 3.12.

The median age in the village was 37.2 years. 27.4% of residents were under the age of 18; 8.9% were between the ages of 18 and 24; 26.1% were from 25 to 44; 28.5% were from 45 to 64; and 9.2% were 65 years of age or older. The gender makeup of the village was 50.2% male and 49.8% female.

=== 2000 census ===
As of the census of 2000, there were 440 people, 153 households, and 111 families living in the village. The population density was 685.3 people per square mile (265.4/km^{2}). There were 170 housing units at an average density of 264.8 per square mile (102.6/km^{2}). The racial makeup of the village was 97.05% White, 0.23% African American, 0.23% Asian, 0.45% from other races, and 2.05% from two or more races. Hispanic or Latino people of any race were 0.68% of the population.

There were 153 households, out of which 47.1% had children under the age of 18 living with them, 51.6% were married couples living together, 16.3% had a female householder with no husband present, and 26.8% were non-families. 24.2% of all households were made up of individuals, and 7.8% had someone living alone who was 65 years of age or older. The average household size was 2.88 and the average family size was 3.41.

In the village, the population was spread out, with 34.8% under the age of 18, 8.4% from 18 to 24, 32.3% from 25 to 44, 16.4% from 45 to 64, and 8.2% who were 65 years of age or older. The median age was 30 years. For every 100 females, there were 97.3 males. For every 100 females age 18 and over, there were 91.3 males.

The median income for a household in the village was $44,063, and the median income for a family was $51,250. Males had a median income of $31,364 versus $22,750 for females. The per capita income for the village was $14,365. About 4.5% of families and 8.7% of the population were below the poverty line, including 10.5% of those under age 18 and 11.9% of those age 65 or over.

== Education ==
It is in the Portage Community School District.

== Notable people ==
- Gladwyn M. Childs, minister, missionary and anthropologist, born in Endeavor
- Keith Doms, librarian
