= William Warner Bishop =

American librarian (1871–1955)

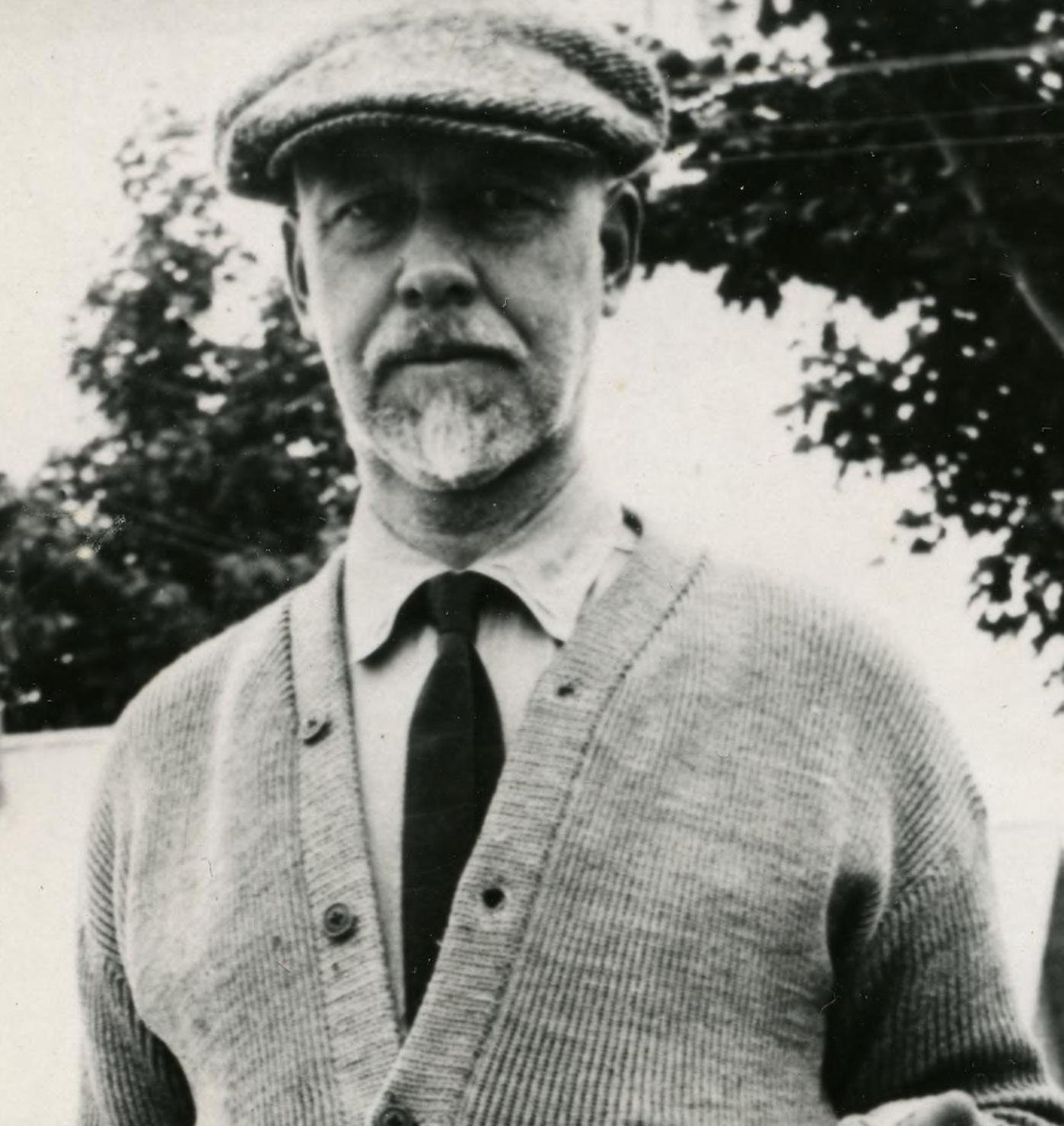

President of the American Library Association
- In office 1918–1919
- Preceded by: Thomas Lynch Montgomery
- Succeeded by: Chalmers Hadley

Personal details
- Born: July 20, 1871 Hannibal, Missouri, USA
- Died: February 19, 1955 (aged 83)
- Resting place: Ann Arbor, Michigan, US
- Education: University of Michigan
- Occupation: Librarian

William Warner Bishop (July 20, 1871 – February 19, 1955) was an American librarian who is credited and remembered for his work organizing and cataloging the Vatican Archives, his time served working with the American Library Association, as well as his support of academic libraries. He has the honor of being named one of the most influential librarians in American history.

== Early life and career ==
William Warner Bishop was born in Missouri in 1871. He relocated to Detroit, Michigan, when he was seven years old. Bishop went on to obtain his undergraduate degree at the University of Michigan in Classics in 1892 and then earned his master's degree the following year. He taught Greek and Latin from the time he graduated until 1902. He was an instructor at Missouri Wesleyan College, Garrett Biblical Institute in Evanston, Illinois and even had the opportunity to spend a year in Rome between 1898 and 1899 studying Greek and Latin. While he taught he usually worked part-time in the academic libraries. He originally thought that he would like to have a career in education but found himself instead drawn to a career working to improve the quality of library services.

Bishop went on to work at Princeton University where he was in charge of cataloging and was also as librarian from 1902 to 1907. He then worked as superintendent of the reading room at the Library of Congress during the years spanning 1905–1915. During this time Bishop married his wife Finie Murfree Burton in 1907. He and Finie had a son, William Warner Bishop Jr.

Bishop accepted the position as director of Michigan Libraries in 1915. The university remained his primary place of employment until he retired in 1941. He worked as not only as director but also worked to help create a Library Science program of study which became a reality in 1926.

== Influential librarian ==
=== United States and international organizations ===
Bishop was a member of the American Library Association having joined in 1896. It was here that he became interested in helping the library system to serve people as productively as possible. He worked as a part of many committees where he also had the honor of presenting countless scholarly papers that he wrote in regard to the controversial topics of the day. Bishop also wrote several books some of these are: Practical Handbook of Modern Library Cataloging, (first edition 1914 and second edition 1924); Cataloging as an Asset, (1916); The Backs of Books and Other Essays in Librarianship, (1926); Carnegie Corporation and College Libraries. (1929–38)...". He was elected President of the American Library Association in 1918. When his one-year term as president was completed, he went on to serve as President of the Bibliographical Society of America in 1921-23 and in 1931 President of the International Federation of Library Associations... In 1928 he became chairman of the Advisory Group on College Libraries of Carnegie Corporation.

=== Vatican City ===
Bishop served as the main advisor in helping The Vatican Library to become better by updating the cataloging system it used as well as reconstructing the building the archives were housed in. This project was sponsored by the Carnegie Endowment for International Peace in 1927 and lasted seven years. In William Warner Bishop's book, The Backs of Books and Other Essays in Librarianship (1926) he explained that the Vatican archives were in poor shape having few if any systems of organization. He chose to request the aid of Charles Martel who worked at the Library of Congress as a cataloger and was considered to be one of the best in his field. With a strong team of people working alongside him, Bishop was able to accomplish his goal. Because of his strong abilities as not only a librarian but also as man who exhibited strong leadership skills and earned the respect of his colleagues, he was able to successfully implement positive change within the Vatican Archives.

=== Advisory Group on College Libraries ===
Bishop worked to aid college libraries in spending grant money supplied to them by the Carnegie Corporation during the years spanning 1928–1943. He and others from the ALA worked out of his office at the University of Michigan where they put together lists of acceptable books for colleges as well as helped college librarians determine their individual needs. Once the books were decided on the group worked to get the best prices from publishers in both the United States and Europe. He worked diligently to ensure that libraries were stocked with only the most acceptable books. For example, if a librarian were to order a book that Bishop felt was not quite right, he would show the librarian a review of the book to try to persuade him or her to choose a different title. Placing the very best material on library shelves became very important to him which could be seen in his article "Changing Ideals In Librarianship" (1919) where Bishop explained that the professional life of a librarian is very demanding due to the many facets of their jobs, which could cause him or her to end up purchasing book that is not worthwhile to the users of that particular library. It was his hope that librarians would remain educated informed of trends in literature so that "trash" would not be purchased just to fill the shelves in an expedient manner.

=== Death and legacy ===
William Warner Bishop was ahead of his time. He believed that the public library as a whole should be made accessible for all persons in the community it served. "In short we librarians are convinced that all printed matter is our province- not necessarily literature alone in the old sense- and that it is our business to get things in print into the hands of every one who can profitably use them- whether he knows it or not". He believed that libraries should be advertised to the public, explaining how what was in the walls could be of service to all citizens; not just scholars or those who had attained a certain level of education. Bishop was also a big proponent of staying ahead of the trends or at least remaining current in library practices. He did not want to see librarians fall behind the ideals of great service and fair practice to all patrons, which would cause a disservice to the instruction he or she represented. He was a dedicated librarian, who worked hard to ensure the future success of libraries.

In 1951 he was awarded American Library Association Honorary Membership.

He died on February 19, 1955.

== Notes ==
Non-profit organization positions
Preceded by Thomas Lynch Montgomery	President of the American Library Association; 1918–1919	Succeeded by Chalmers Hadley
