= Roger McDonough =

American librarian (1909-2001)

Roger H. McDonough

President of the American Library Association
- In office 1968–1969
- Preceded by: Foster E. Mohrhardt
- Succeeded by: William S. Dix

Personal details
- Born: February 24, 1909
- Died: December 2, 2001 (aged 92) Princeton, New Jersey, United States
- Education: Columbia University
- Occupation: Librarian

Roger H. McDonough (February 24, 1909 – December 2, 2001) was an American librarian and president of the American Library Association from 1968 to 1969.

He worked at the Rutgers University Libraries as an undergraduate and continued working there as a reference librarian while he attended the Columbia University School of Library Service for a degree in library science. In 1937 he became the Director of New Brunswick, New Jersey Public Library.

He served in the U.S. Air Force during World War Two.

In 1947, he was named the first professional State Librarian for the state of New Jersey. In that role, McDonough focused on cooperation among the state's libraries and developed a law library to serve the New Jersey state legislature. For the American Library Association he served on Council and on the Executive Board. He was chairman of the Federal Relations Committee testifying on behalf of ALA before various congressional committees.

McDonough also supported the creation of a graduate school of library science at Rutgers University in 1954 and the New Jersey State Cultural Center in 1965. When he retired in 1975, he continued to work as a consultant to the New Jersey Library Association.

He wrote the chapter on "Public Libraries" in A History of New Jersey Libraries, 1750–1996.

Non-profit organization positions
Preceded by Foster E. Mohrhardt	President of the American Library Association; 1968–1969	Succeeded by William S. Dix
