= Eric Moon =

British-American librarian (1923 – 2016)

President of the American Library Association
- In office 1977–1978
- Preceded by: Clara Stanton Jones
- Succeeded by: Russell Shank

Personal details
- Born: Eric Edward Moon; 6 March 1923 Yeovil, England
- Died: 31 July 2016 (aged 93) Sarasota, Florida, US
- Education: Loughborough College
- Occupation: Librarian; editor

Eric Edward Moon (6 March 1923 – 31 July 2016) was a librarian and editor who had a shaping influence on American librarianship in the 1960s, 1970s, 1980s, and 1990s as editor-in-chief of Library Journal, president of the American Library Association, and chief editor at Scarecrow Press. Moon was a trailblazer and influential figure instrumental in transforming library professionalism, polity, and social responsibility.

== Biography ==
=== Early life ===
Eric Moon was born on 6 March 1923 in Yeovil, England, and spent most of his youth in Southampton. After receiving his grammar (secondary) school certificate from then Taunton School, Moon was hired as a junior library assistant at the prestigious Southampton Public Library in 1939.

Moon then pursued professional qualification by passing the Library Association's mastery examination. The Library Association (now the Chartered Institute of Library and Information Professionals) was the United Kingdom's foremost library organization, and counterpart to the American Library Association (ALA).

Moon soon began his military service in 1941, joining the Royal Air Force. Following his discharge in 1946 he pursued his professional education as a librarian, at the then Loughborough College. While at Loughborough, Moon completed the rigorous requirements of advancement to the highest level of honor, FLA, Fellow of the Library Association. He began his professional career running small libraries in Hertfordshire, at Finchley, at Brentford and Chiswick, and then at Kensington, experimenting with novel ideas in library service through this period. Frustrated with the conservatism of British librarianship, in 1958 he took a job as head of public libraries in Newfoundland, Canada, where he worked for one year.

=== Library Journal ===
In 1959 Moon was hired as editor-in-chief of Library Journal, based in New York City. The leadership of the R.R. Bowker company, Library Journal's publisher, saw in Moon a personality they hoped would revive the struggling magazine and take it in new directions. Library Journal's fame dated back to the late 19th century with Melvil Dewey serving as its founding editor from 1876 to 1881.

In his nine years as editor-in-chief, Moon changed Library Journal substantially, most noticeably by engaging the magazine in controversial issues and taking sides in the heated debates that characterized American librarianship during the period. Under Moon's editorship, Library Journal became known for its liberal, activist perspectives on the professional issues of the day. With Moon at the helm, Library Journal earned consistent profits from advertising revenues and sweeping interest marked by an increase in circulation.

This change in direction was first defined by Moon's choice in 1960 to address racial segregation in Southern libraries, where African American librarians were not allowed to work in "white" libraries or participate in the library associations of Southern states. Until Moon, no mainstream publications so much as acknowledged the discrimination in library access. Moon soon realized that he needed support from black librarians to continue reporting accurately on activities in the South. Moon formed alliances with many, including Elonnie "E.J." Josey who was an African American librarian at Savannah State College (Savannah, Georgia). Moon, along with Josey and countless others, advanced the concern of free access and integration of libraries and professional library associations. The debate over racially segregated libraries divided the profession at that time, and Moon's activist position placed his Library Journal in the camp of those in the profession who advocated significant change.

Moon also tackled the largely protested Vietnam War. Moon's editorials continued to challenge the profession during the tumultuous 1960s. Likewise, Moon's credit includes Library Journal's treatment of censorship and book selection practices in libraries. This transformation made Library Journal popular reading for American librarians; by the mid-1960s the magazine was financially thriving. In 1965 Eric Moon was appointed to the Bowker Board of Directors.

In that year he also became a citizen of the United States.

=== Later life ===
Moon quit his post as editor-in-chief of Library Journal in 1968, shortly after Bowker was acquired by the Xerox Corporation. In 1969 he was hired as the chief editor of Scarecrow Press, a small publisher with ties to the library community that had recently been purchased by the Grolier Educational Corporation (now a subsidiary of Scholastic, Inc.), taking over for founder Ralph Shaw. At Scarecrow, Moon rapidly increased the number of titles published per year, while introducing higher standards for editorial accuracy. (Scarecrow had been notorious for typographical errors in its books.) He also broadened the scope of the press beyond its traditional focus on library science topics to include religion and music, just to name a few. In 1971, Moon became the company's president. Moon retired from Scarecrow Press in 1978.

Moon was much involved in the American Library Association (ALA) - its function, rules and policies throughout his American career. He had no qualms about criticizing the ALA, particularly regarding ALA's silence on the issue of racial prejudice and discrimination in libraries and library associations. By 1965, Moon was elected to the ALA Council. Moon ran for the office of Vice-President/President-Elect of the American Library Association as a petition candidate in 1976 and was elected. He was inaugurated in 1977.

The major concern of his presidential year was to influence the development of a national information policy. Events in the profession during his term made it difficult to arouse strong interest in this goal within the association, whose leaders mostly lacked prior experience in the policy arena to begin with. Following his presidential year, Moon continued to influence ALA politics as a member of its governing Council and various committees into the mid-1990s.

In 1981, Moon received the Joseph W. Lippincott Award and in 1987 American Library Association Honorary Membership. ALA's top award. In 2000, Moon was bestowed the highest honor by the British library profession, the coveted Honorary Fellowship, awarded by the Chartered Institute of Library and Information Professionals.

Eric Moon retired to live in Sarasota, Florida, with his wife Ilse Moon (1932-2024), retired secretary of the Association for Library and Information Science Education. He died there on 31 July 2016 at the age of 93.

Non-profit organization positions
Preceded by Clara Stanton Jones	President of the American Library Association; 1977–1978	Succeeded by Russell Shank
