= Ruth Mortimer =

American books curator and librarian

Ruth Mortimer (September 16, 1931 – January 31, 1994) was an American rare books curator and librarian, known for her work at both Harvard University and Smith College. From 1988 to 1992, Mortimer served as the president of the Bibliographical Society of America, the first woman to inhabit the role.

== Early life and education ==
Ruth Mortimer was born on September 16, 1931, in Syracuse, New York, to Donald Cameron Mortimer and Lillian Ruth Burk The family moved to Rochester, New York, before Mortimer entered school.

As a first year at Smith College in 1949, Mortimer worked as an assistant in the Rare Books Collection, which was then under the curatorship of Dorothy King. Mortimer graduated summa cum laude from Smith in 1953. During her first three summers at Smith, Mortimer worked as a proofreader for the Lawyers' Co-operative Publishing Company in Rochester. After Smith, Mortimer worked for a year as a pre-professional librarian at the Brooklyn Public Library; during this time, she also took courses in French at the Columbia University School of General Studies.

In 1954, Mortimer started study at the Columbia University School of Library Service. For financial support, she worked as an Assistant in Serials at the Smith College Library and also ead papers for two courses there. She received her M.S. from Columbia in 1957.

Mortimer also earned a certificate at the Shakespeare Institute of the University of Birmingham, England, in 1955.

== Career ==
From 1957 to 1975, Mortimer worked at Harvard's Houghton Library. While there, in 1964, she produced two catalogues of the institution's 16th Century French and Italian books, the first of which was chosen by the American Institute of Graphic Arts as one of the Fifty Books of the Year for that year. These books are considered "standard reference works in the field," notes The New York Times, and were "a monument of good typography [and] their author's learning and industry" according to the Independent. In these catalogues Mortimer showcased a breadth of knowledge on illustrators and placed specific focus on the visual artistry of the books within.

In 1975, she returned to Smith College as curator of the Rare Books Collection. In addition to her curatorial duties, Mortimer gave lectures on art history and taught a seminar on book composition. The Rare Book Collection grew exponentially under Mortimer's curatorship: in 1981 and 1986 (respectively), she oversaw the acquisition of Smith's lauded Sylvia Plath and Virginia Woolf collections. Mortimer was also responsible for Smith's 1976 acquisition of a three-volume original edition of Mary Shelley's Frankenstein. Mortimer herself was fascinated with Frankenstein and collected editions of the novel and ephemera related to the novel, which now resides at Smith. Mortimer also oversaw the Smith College library's one-millionth volume purchase, the Epistole devotissime of St. Catherine of Siena.

Mortimer was the first woman elected to serve as president of the Bibliographical Society of America, a position she held from 1988 to 1992. Between 1981 and 1988, Mortimer, in collaboration with her husband, edited the BSA's quarterly journal, Papers.

In Mortimer was honored as a Rosenbach Fellow in Bibliography in 1984-1985 lecturing on "L 'Art de Bien Batir: French 16th Century Architecture Books."

Mortimer also served on the councils of the Renaissance Society of America and the Grolier Club.

== Personal life ==
Mortimer married John Lancaster on April 13, 1974. Lancaster has served as Curator of Special Collections at Amherst College.

== Death and legacy ==
Mortimer died on January 31, 1994, at her home in Williamsburg, Massachusetts, of breast cancer. Smith renamed its rare books room the Mortimer Rare Book Room in her honor, before her death. The institution's collection of rare books was eventually renamed the Mortimer Rare Book Collection after her.

== Honors ==
- 1966: Guggenheim Fellowship
- 1984-5: Rosenbach Fellow in Bibliography, University of Pennsylvania
- 1991: Columbia University School of Library Service Distinguished Alumni Award
- 1992: John M. Greene Award, Smith College

== Works ==
- Catalogue of books and manuscripts / Harvard College Library, Department of Printing and Graphic Arts Pt. 1. French 16th century books Vol. 1 (1964) Cambridge, Mass.: Belknap Press of Harvard University Press
- Catalogue of Books and Manuscripts / Harvard College Library, Department of Printing and Graphic Arts Pt. 2 Italian 16th Century Books Vol. 2 (1974) Cambridge, Mass.: Belknap Press of Harvard University Press
- The Selma Erving Collection: Modern Illustrated Books (1977) Northampton, Mass.: Smith College Museum of Art [with Colles Baxter and John Lancaster]
- A Portrait of the Author in Sixteenth-Century France (1980) Chapel Hill: University of North Carolina at Chapel Hill
- The Last Castle (1985) Northampton, Mass: Hypatia Press [with Dorothy L. Sayers and Naomi Morrissette] [Preface by]
- The Bewildering Thread (1986) Wallingford, Pa.: ELM Press [with Enid Mark and Sarah Black) [conception and supervision by]
- Fifteen Women Book Collectors (1990) New York: The Grolier Club [with Marie Elena Korey]
- Mortimer, Ruth. “St. Catherine of Siena and the Printed Book.” The Papers of the Bibliographical Society of America 86, no. 1 (1992): 11–22.
