= Edward G. Holley =

American librarian

President of the American Library Association
- In office 1974–1975
- Preceded by: Jean E. Lowrie
- Succeeded by: Allie Beth Martin

Personal details
- Born: Edward Gailon Holley; November 26, 1927 Pulaski, Tennessee, US
- Died: February 18, 2010 (aged 82) Durham, North Carolina, US
- Education: David Lipscomb College; George Peabody College for Teachers; University of Illinois at Urbana-Champaign
- Occupation: Librarian

Edward Gailon Holley (November 26, 1927 – February 18, 2010) was an American librarian, library historian, and educator.

== Education ==
Holley graduated from David Lipscomb College in Nashville, Tennessee in 1949 with a bachelor's degree in English. In 1951 he graduated from George Peabody College for Teachers in Nashville, Tennessee with a master's in library science.

After serving in the U.S.Navy during the Korean War, Holley went on to receive his Ph.D. in library science at the University of Illinois at Urbana-Champaign in 1961. He wrote Charles Evans: American Bibliographer.

== Career ==
Holley began his professional career at the University of Houston and worked there for nine years. In 1972 he moved to Chapel Hill, North Carolina, where he accepted the position of dean and professor in the School of Information and Library Science. He held the William Rand Kenan Jr. Professorship. He remained dean until 1985, and was a professor from 1989 to 1995, when he retired.

=== American Library Association ===
Holley was president of the American Library Association (ALA) from 1974-1975. He played a significant role in the celebration of the American Library Association’s (ALA) 100th anniversary in 1976. He wrote the essay, "ALA at 100," which was published in the ALA Yearbook (centennial edition, 1976) and later reprinted as a standalone 32-page booklet by the ALA.

He was honored with the Association's Melvil Dewey Medal in 1983 and the Joseph W. Lippincott Award in 1987. He was named the Academic Research Librarian of the Year in 1988 by the Association of College and Research Libraries and honored with the Beta Phi Mu Award in 1992.

He wrote Raking the Historic Coals: The A.L.A. Scrapbook of 1876.

Holley was an expert witness in defense of the ALA-accredited degree in the legal case,"Merwine v. Board of Trustees for State Institutions of Higher Learning" (US Court of Appeals for the Fifth Circuit, March 8, 1985).

== Legacy ==
In 1994, the volume For the Good of the Order: Essays in Honor of Edward G. Holley was published in recognition of his career.

The Library History Seminar IX: Libraries and Philanthropy was held in 1995 and dedicated to Edward G. Holley. The Library History Round Table established an annual lecture in Holley's memory in 2006 which is held at the annual conference of the American Library Association.

The Edward G. Holley Papers, 1970-2001, are at the University of North Carolina at Chapel Hill.

== Selected publications ==
- Holley, Edward G. Charles Evans: American Bibliographer. University of Illinois Press, 1963.
- Holley Edward G. (1967). Raking the Historic Coals: The A.L.A. Scrapbook of 1876. Pittsburgh: Beta Phi Mu.
- Holley, Edward G. “The Past as Prologue: The Work of the Library Historian.” The Journal of Library History 12, no. 2 (1977): 110–27.
- Holley, Edward G. ALA at 100. American Library Association, 1976.
- Holley, Edward G., and Robert F. Schremser. The Library Services and Construction Act: An Historical Overview from the Viewpoint of Major Participants. JAI Press, 1983.
- Holley, E. G. (1984). "The Merwine Case and the MLS: Where was ALA?" American Libraries 15(5), 327-330.
- Holley, Edward G. “Academic Libraries over Twenty-Five Years.” The Journal of Academic Librarianship vol. 25, no. 2, 1999.

Non-profit organization positions
| Preceded by Jean E. Lowrie | President of the American Library Association; 1974–1975 | Succeeded by Allie Beth Martin |
