= New York Library Association =

Professional association for New York's librarians

- Formation: 1890
- Type: Non-profit; NGO
- Purpose: NYLA leads, educates, and advocates for the advancement of the New York library community.
- Headquarters: Guilderland, New York
- Region served: United States
- Executive Director: AnnaLee Dragon
- Website: New York Library Association

The New York Library Association (NYLA) is a group that promotes libraries in New York. It was founded in 1890 and was the first statewide organization of librarians in the United States. One of its founders was Melvil Dewey, who has had a lasting impact on libraries in the United States. The association was granted a provisional charter in 1929 and its Absolute Charter in 1946.

== Affiliation ==
NYLA is affiliated with the American Library Association (ALA) as the New York Chapter of ALA. ALA is the oldest and largest library association in the world.

== Current status ==
From a membership of 43 in 1890, NYLA has grown to 4,829 members at the end of the 2022-2023 Fiscal Year. Members include library staff from public, system, school, college and university and special libraries, as well as library trustees, and friends of libraries.

The association publishes a weekly email newsletter, 'News You Can Use', a monthly electronic publication, NYLA Voice, and a JOBline.

The association hosts a yearly conference in the fall, which focuses on professional development and networking. At the conference, NYLA recognizes members' achievements and contributions to the library community through awards, fellowships, and scholarships for library school students.

Every year, NYLA coordinates an Advocacy Day, where library staff, trustees, and supporters gather in Albany, NY to talk with State Senators and Assembly people, or their staff. During these meetings, library advocates talk about what public and school libraries are doing, their funding needs for the coming budget year, and legislation that would be helpful to libraries and their communities.

NYLA hosts "Spring on the Hill" every year, which is a full day mini-conference educational programming focused on advocacy. The event also includes time for networking.

== See also ==
- List of libraries in the United States
