= Mortimer Rare Book Collection =

Collection of books at Smith College

- Location: Northampton, Massachusetts, United States of America
- Type: University library
- Established: 1937

Collection
- Size: 45,000 books and manuscripts

Other information
- Website: https://libraries.smith.edu/special-collections/about/mortimer-rare-book-collection

The Mortimer Rare Book Collection (MRBC) is the rare books collection of Smith College. Along with the Sophia Smith Collection and Smith College Archives, it makes up Smith College Special Collections. The collection supports both general research and the curriculum of Smith College classes.

== History ==
Smith created its first Rare Book Room in the 1937 addition to Neilson Library, under the direction of Smith librarian Mary E. Dunham.

It was renamed the Mortimer Rare Book Room in 1994 in honor of curator and teacher Ruth Mortimer, who herself graduated from Smith, and served as the collection's steward from 1975 until her death in 1994. It was under Mortimer's leadership that the collection developed its Sylvia Plath and Virginia Woolf collections. The repository was renamed the Mortimer Rare Book Collection when it became a part of Smith College Special Collections, a then-newly formed entity at Smith.

== Collections ==
The MRBC has extensive holdings of both printed books and literary manuscripts, including cuneiform tables, European and American herbals, modernist literature, artist's books, and book historical artifacts and examples. Among the Collection’s eighty incunables (books printed before 1501) is the Epistole devotissime of St. Catherine of Siena (Venice: Aldus Manutius, 1500), acquired in 1987 as Smith College Libraries' millionth volume.

Collection highlights include:

- Sylvia Plath collection (and related collections, as well as a small selection of Plath realia)
- Ann M. Martin papers
- Papers of Virginia Woolf
- George Salter papers
- Leonard Baskin broadsides and prints
- Sally Taft Duplaix Collection (mainly comprising 20th century lesbian pulp fiction)
