= Connecticut Library Association =

Professional association for librarians in Connecticut

- Nickname: CLA
- Formation: February 23, 1891; 135 years ago
- Headquarters: Belchertown, Massachusetts
- Parent organization: American Library Association
- Website: ctlibraryassociation.org

The Connecticut Library Association (CLA) is a professional organization for Connecticut's librarians and library workers. It is headquartered in Belchertown, Massachusetts. It was founded on February 23, 1891, in New Haven, Connecticut, with the purpose of promoting "library interests by discussion and interchange of ideas and methods, and not to 'trench upon the province of the American Library Association.'" The first regular CLA meeting was held in the Wadsworth Atheneum in May 1891. CLA's initial membership was thirty people and dues were fifty cents. The first CLA president of the Association was Addison Van Name who served from the organization's founding in 1891 to 1892. CLA urged the state of Connecticut to provide incentives for towns to make their libraries public. The state responded by offering grants of up to $200 yearly for libraries to spend on books.

The CLA, jointly with the Connecticut Association of School Librarians (CASL) hosts the annual Nutmeg Book Awards to honor children's and young adult literature. Nominees are selected by CLA and CASL members, as well as students. Winners are chosen by a student vote.

== See also ==
- List of libraries in the United States
