= American Libraries =

Magazine of the American Library Association

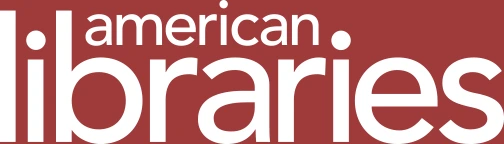
- Categories: Libraries
- Frequency: Six times a year, plus one digital-only issue and occasional supplements
- Circulation: Approx. 58,000 members and organizations
- Publisher: American Library Association
- Founded: 1970; 55 years ago
- Country: United States
- Based in: Chicago, Illinois, U.S.
- Language: English
- Website: americanlibrariesmagazine.org
- ISSN: 0002-9769
- OCLC: 854299

American Libraries is the flagship magazine of the American Library Association (ALA).

== About ==
American Libraries was first published in 1970 as a continuation of the long-running ALA Bulletin, which had served as the Association’s official publication since 1907. It is published six times yearly in print, plus a digital-only July/August issue and occasional digital supplements, such as the annual State of America’s Libraries report. The magazine is sent to approximately 58,000 individuals and organizations worldwide. ALA members receive American Libraries as a benefit of membership. Content is available online to the public at americanlibrariesmagazine.org.

The magazine publishes several annual features, including the "Library Design Showcase,”"which highlights new and innovative library architecture and design projects; "Emerging Leaders," a spotlight on the ALA's professional development program for new librarians; and library technology expert Marshall Breeding's "Library Systems Report."

American Libraries' Newsmaker feature, which appears in each issue, has included interviews with Margaret Atwood, Judy Blume, Dolly Parton, Emilio Estevez, Al Gore, Stan Lee, George Takei, Alice Walker, Pharrell Williams, Jacqueline Woodson, Debbie Harry, and others.

== Additional American Libraries media ==
American Libraries' website and blog The Scoop feature online versions of print edition stories, as well as breaking news and stories not in print, including onsite reporting from the ALA Midwinter Meeting and Annual Conference and updates from the ALA's Public Policy and Advocacy Office in Washington, D.C.

Since 2006, American Libraries has published AL Direct, an electronic newsletter sent twice weekly to ALA members that provides summaries and links to news, announcements, and other information of interest to library and information science professionals. The newsletter is supplemented daily by other news through American Libraries' website widget, Latest Library Links.

Launched in 2019, the Daily Scoop is American Libraries' conference e-newsletter, providing attendees with daily recaps of events at the ALA's Midwinter Meeting and Annual Conference.

Dewey Decibel is a monthly podcast of conversations with librarians, authors, celebrities, and scholars about topics from the library world. Since its first episode in 2016, the podcast has covered subjects ranging from banned books and fake news to disaster response and artificial intelligence in libraries. The podcast’s annual Halloween episodes have investigated library hauntings and mysteries. Past guests have included Kwame Alexander, Ken Burns, Michael Eric Dyson, Sally Field, Brad Meltzer, Bill Nye, Marjane Satrapi, and Rick Steves. In November 2018, Book Riot named Dewey Decibel one of its recommended podcasts about libraries and librarians. The podcast is named for the widely used Dewey Decimal Classification system. American Libraries has acknowledged that Melvil Dewey, for whom the classification is named, has a legacy tainted by sexual harassment and racism.

American Libraries Live free webinars, established in 2012, give the library community a chance to learn about and discuss issues members deal with daily. Each program lasts 60 minutes.

American Libraries is active on Facebook and Twitter, where staffers share content from the magazine, breaking news, and coverage from ALA conferences and meetings. Its Twitter account broke the story that actor and writer Sonia Manzano was retiring from Sesame Street in 2015.

== Awards ==
In 2018, American Libraries Art Director Rebecca Lomax was awarded a 2018 Peter Lisagor Award for best design by a specialty or trade publication. Presented by the Chicago Headline Club, the largest chapter of the Society of Professional Journalists, the awards recognize the best of Chicago journalism. Lomax was recognized for her design work on the March/April 2018 ("In a Virtual World"), September/October 2018 ("The 2018 Library Design Showcase"), and November/December 2018 ("Good Job Hunting") issues.

== Controversies ==
In 1992, American Libraries published a photo of members of the Gay, Lesbian, Bisexual, and Transgender Round Table (then known as the Gay and Lesbian Task Force) on the cover of its July/August issue, drawing both criticism and praise from the library world. Some commenters called the cover "in poor taste" and accused the magazine of "glorifying homosexuality," while others were supportive of the move.

In the 2016 “Special Report: Digital Humanities in Libraries” article, the contractors expressed concerns about the editors inserting quotes that were "grossly inappropriate" for the magazine after they believed a final version was approved. A blog post from the publishers Gale Cengage clarified that they had not been responsible for the insertion of the quotes.
