= John Griswold White =

American lawyer

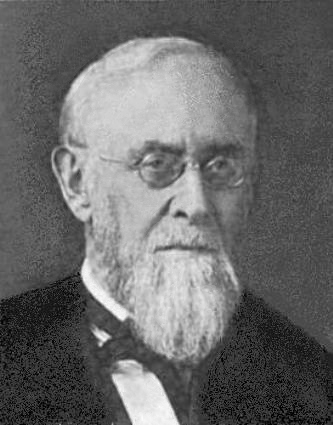
- White, circa 1920s, in a photograph from his former law firm Speith, Bell, McCurdy and Newell
- Born: August 10, 1845; Cleveland, Ohio
- Died: August 27, 1928; Jackson, Wyoming
- Burial place: Lake View Cemetery
- Occupations: Attorney, Library Board President
- Parents: Bushnell White (father); Elizabeth Brainard Clark (mother)

Signature
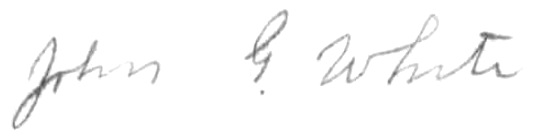

John Griswold White (10 August 1845 – 27 August 1928) was a prominent Cleveland attorney, a chess connoisseur, and a bibliophile.

== Early life and education ==
John Griswold White was born in Cleveland, Ohio, in 1845 to Bushnell and Elizabeth Brainard (Clark) White, both originally from Massachusetts. White's birthplace was located on what was then Lake Street (near the present-day City Hall). Both of John Griswold White's parents valued education, and Bushnell White once wrote a letter to the Cleveland Herald and Gazette in March 1847 that read in part: "Freedom and equal rights have ever, and always will, exist in proportion to the knowledge of the people." Bushnell White graduated from Williams College, and Elizabeth White graduated from Troy (NY) Female Seminary.

John G. White was born near-sighted but was not diagnosed until he was a teenager. Although fitted with glasses eventually, White usually read without them, preferring (according to his contemporaries) to hold the books close to his face.

White received early education in the Little Red School House of Northford, Connecticut, at home, and at Canandaigua Academy. In Connecticut, where books and money were scarce, White learned to read quickly. He befriended a nearby town's bookseller, who allowed him to read while his mother did her weekly shopping.

He later attended Central High School in Cleveland and Western Reserve College in Hudson, Ohio, where he was elected to Phi Beta Kappa. Two of White's favorite college professors were Nathan Perkins Seymour (classics) and Charles Augustus Young (mathematics and science). He played chess with Young every Wednesday evening, often into the early hours of the morning.

White was the salutatorian at Western Reserve College at his 1865 graduation, and delivered the address in Latin. After graduation, he studied law under his father.

== Career ==
In 1868, White was admitted to the Ohio Bar, and practiced in the U.S. District and Northern District of Ohio. In 1903, he was admitted to the U.S. Court of Appeals, and to the U.S. Supreme Court in 1910, receiving the degree of Doctor of Laws from Western Reserve in 1919. White practiced law in 1870, partnering with Robert E. Mix and Judge Conway W. Noble. The law firm's name changed as partners retired or died, and as it joined or absorbed other firms. Currently named Schneider Smeltz Spieth Bell LLP, the firm remains in operation.

One of White's most prominent cases was as special counsel for the Cleveland Railway in litigation against Tom L. Johnson over the Municipal Railway. Later, he helped Federal Judge Robert W. Tayler in writing the Tayler grant. White also was the attorney for the Catholic Diocese of Northern Ohio under three bishops, though White himself was not Catholic.

White was elected to the Cleveland Public Library's board of directors for the first time on May 5, 1884. He was elected president at a meeting of the "Board of Managers of the Public Library" on May 13, 1884, and served the following year in 1885 as president, also. He became Library Board President again in 1910 until his death in 1928. He also helped appoint William Brett as director and Linda Eastman as Brett's successor. Marilla Waite Freeman served as head of the library's Main Library building during White's tenure.

In 1884, Cleveland Public Library was thought to be mismanaged. Together with William Brett, White began a survey to discover how other libraries were being managed. In succeeding years, this led to: a newer shelf-classification system for the Cleveland Public Library derived from the Dewey Decimal System; an open-shelf system allowing patrons access to the collection; and establishing branches, sub-branches, deposit stations, and delivery stations. White, being concerned about Cleveland Public Library staff, established one of the earliest staff annuity plans for public employees.

== Personal life ==
When taking walks, John and his father would engage in intellectual activities such as only speaking Latin one day, Greek another, and having a "Chess Day" where they would play chess by memory with neither pieces nor a board. White loved romantic novels and stories of the Wild West, in which reading was his primary relaxation. His house on 1871 East 89th Street was permeated with novels and hundreds of books on chess. White wore a beard long after it became unfashionable. He never owned an automobile, and often rode streetcars between his home on Bolton Street, and later East 89th Street and his office downtown. White was a bachelor until his death at age 83.

== John G. White Collection ==
John Griswold White began donating books to the Cleveland Public Library in 1885, presenting William H. Brett with 122 maps and four books. By 1913, the number had reached 25.000. It was that same year in 1913 the Cleveland Public Library moved to the Kinney-Levan building on upper Euclid Avenue. This warehouse-looking building provided William H. Brett with space to open White's collection to the public.

John G. White's fascination with chess was lifelong, from the "chess walks" with his father to his collecting chess-related books, information, and materials. "Over a period of some fifty years he conducted a determined quest, throughout the world, for desirable additions to his library," the chess master and author Al Horowitz wrote in 1969.

White's donation of folklore and Orientalia books to the library was influenced by the fact that the library had few books about the Philippines, which the United States acquired, and the major reduction in funds by Mayor Robert McKisson. Thus, when Brett asked for advice on library financial assistance, White agreed to help out by purchasing books out of his own pocket.

After White left the Cleveland Public Library Board in 1886, he noticed the library purchased cheaper, popular books, which prompted him to donate scholarly books to the library. Also, to fill the void of his mother dying, he had a vision of public service to the Cleveland Public Library.

White owned two personal copies of Das erste Jartausend der Schachlitteratur (850-1880) zusammengestellt (The First Thousand Years of Chess Literature (850-1880) Compiled) by Antonius van der Linde and turned one into a personal inventory of his collection of books. White would note the items he owned within the text of the book itself but note new titles published since 1880 on a blank page inserted behind each page of van der Linde's work. White's goal was to collect everything published specifically on chess as well as chess manuscripts and any other texts that mentioned or were related to chess, (e.g., Through the Looking-Glass, Rubaiyat of Omar Khayyam).

Chess historian H. J. R. Murray, who called White's chess library the largest in the world, made extensive use of the collection in writing his classic treatise A History of Chess. White donated his collection to the Cleveland Public Library to form the John G. White Collection on Folklore, Orientalia, and Chess.

At the time of John. G. White's death in 1928, the valuable collection numbered 60,000 volumes. Gordon W. Thayer shaped the collection through his perceptive knowledge and patterns set by White's will. In 1969, an exhibit titled: "The Remarkable Mr. White," included medieval manuscripts, 16th century chivalry romances, treatises on astrology and witchcraft, books of proverbs and folklore, early dictionaries and grammars in some 7,000 languages represented in the collection and personal diaries.

The library has since split the collection into three:

- The John G. White Chess and Checkers Collection is described as the "[l]argest chess library in the world (32,568 volumes of books and serials, including 6,359 volumes of bound periodicals.)"
- The John G. White Folklore Collection contains 47,040 volumes, "one of the largest in the nation. It is broadly defined in scope and international in coverage without period restrictions. Included are primitive, peasant, native, and folk cultures within geographic restrictions."
- The John G. White Collection of Orientalia includes "materials on Asia, the Near and Middle East, Africa, Australia and Oceania," emphasizing "the humanistic and social science aspects of traditional cultures prior to the impact of European influence."

== Death ==
White left Cleveland for a fishing trip at his favorite mountain resort in Jackson Lake, Wyoming, with his friend and former law associate T.A. McCaslin for a fishing trip. Four weeks into his vacation, White died from pneumonia on August 27, 1928. The funeral service was held at the First Unitarian Church on Euclid Avenue and East 82nd Street, with the Reverend Dilworth Lupton conducting. In attendance were Judge John C. Hutchins, and many of White's young apprentices from his White, Cannon, & Spieth Firm. The Cleveland Public Library closed its doors in the afternoon. In attendance were the Cleveland Public Library administrators, the library's board members, and over 100 librarians who passed Mr. White in Cleveland Public Library halls with occasional glances. The Reverend Lupton stated "Mr. White was a man rich of deeds, a man who shunned the limelight and publicity. His friends speak of his honesty, courageous thinking and speaking. His love of nature, people and books. He was a man who grew around him a group of friends to whom he was constantly loyal."
