= Andrew Keogh =

Andrew Keogh may refer to:

- Andy Keogh (born 1986), Irish footballer
- Andrew Keogh (librarian) (1869–1953), English-born American librarian
