= Effie Louise Power =

American librarian

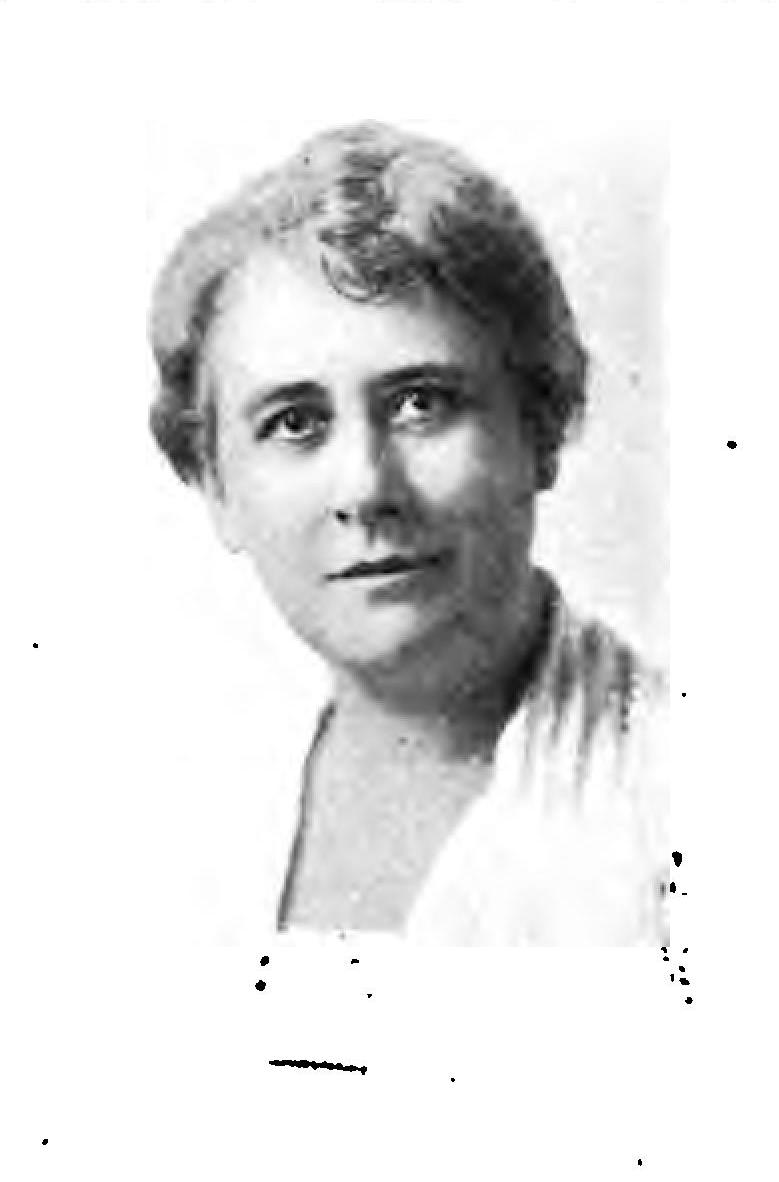
- Born: February 12, 1873; Conneautville
- Died: October 8, 1969 (aged 96)
- Occupation: Librarian

Effie Louise Power (February 12, 1873 – October 8, 1969) was a children's librarian, educator, author, and storyteller. She encouraged children's book production and evaluated children's literature. She “directly influenced the development of services to children in three major United States cities: Cleveland, St. Louis, and Pittsburgh.” Power also traveled across the U.S. lecturing students and librarians on children and youth library services. She worked to build a network of children's librarians across the country who supported each other and established high standards for all in the profession.

== Early life and education ==
Power was born February 12, 1873, in Conneautville, Pennsylvania in the United States to mother Francis Billing and father William Ellis Power. Power never married or had children.

After Power graduated from high school, William Howard Brett, a Power family neighbor, jump-started her career by encouraging her to write the entrance exam for the Cleveland Public Library (CPL). Shortly thereafter, Power began working at the CPL in 1895. Brett, a librarian at the CPL, not only served as Power's mentor during her time there, but also put her in charge of the "Junior Alcove". Later, on February 22, 1898, Brett opened the CPL's first stand-alone children's room. He put Power in charge, effectively making her the first children's librarian in the Cleveland Public Library System.

== Children's librarianship ==
As the Cleveland Public Library's children's librarian, Power worked to instill in children a love of books and reading. She also sought to debunk the myth that children lacked interest in nonfiction. At the time, people believed that children had to be forced to read nonfiction books. Power believed that with encouragement and when given ample opportunity, children could enjoy nonfiction. To prove her point, Power took age-appropriate nonfiction works from the other library sections and displayed them on the shelves in the children's room. As she expected, the children loved the books.

Power graduated from the Carnegie Library in Pittsburgh, PA in 1904. She earned a diploma in their program for children's librarians. Two years later she graduated with a teaching certificate from Columbia University.

== Career ==
"The consciousness that none of us is working alone in her endeavor to bring worthwhile books to children should strengthen us."

— Effie Louise Power, in her inaugural address to the ALA's Children's Library Association, 1925.

Power spent a great deal of her career lecturing at schools and training other librarians in the area of children and youth services. Over many years, she helped establish curricula for and taught at library schools across the country, including Western Reserve University, the Cleveland Public Library's training program, Columbia University, and City Normal School in Cleveland. Power felt it was important to establish standards for children's librarians across the country.

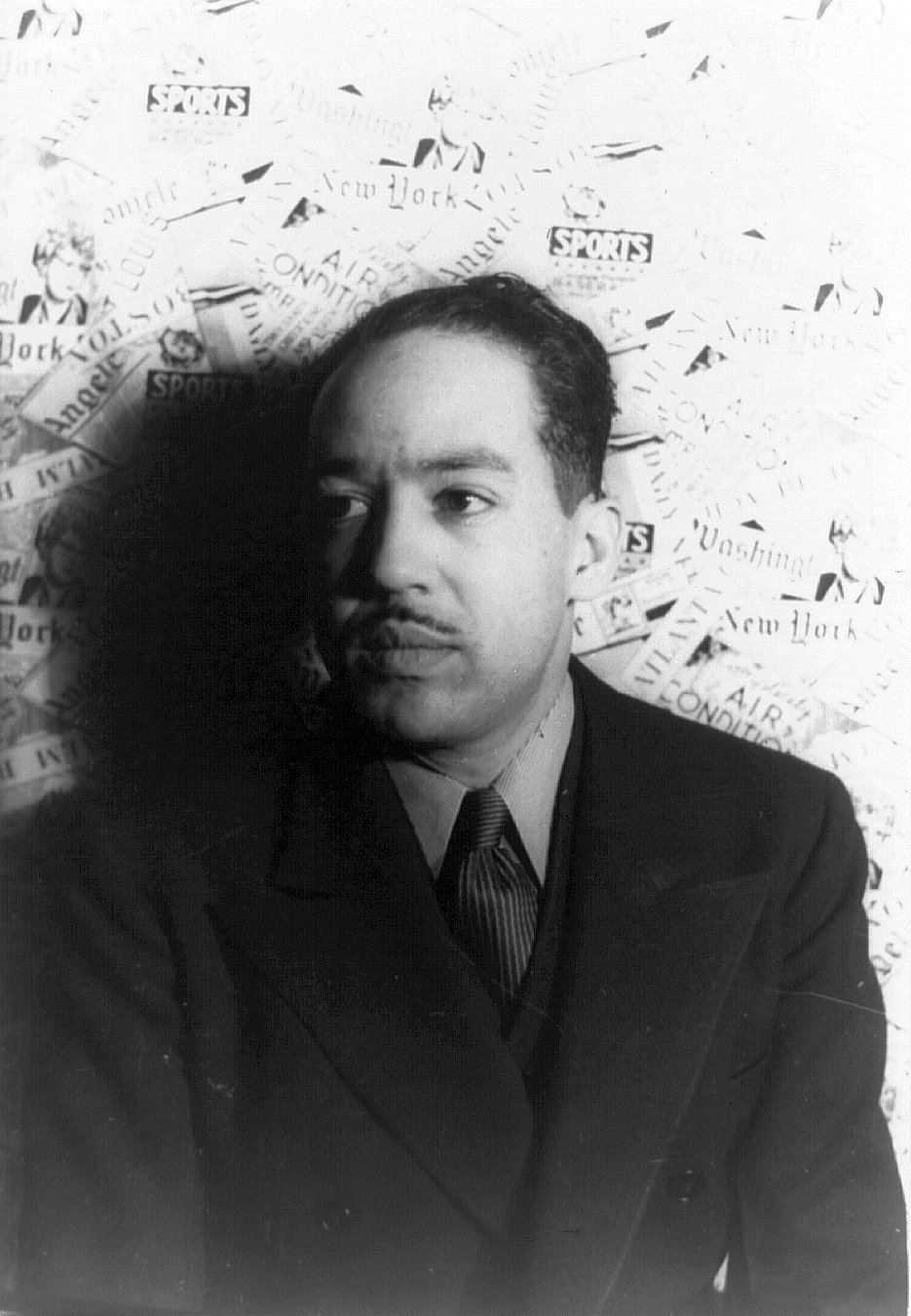
Langston Hughes in 1936

Having worked her entire career in ethnically and racially diverse cities, Power worked to ensure access to library resources for all. She worked on book lists and programs she felt were appropriate for all young patrons. In 1926, she established the Book Caravan, the forerunner of the Bookmobile. Power also encouraged the writings of Langston Hughes, an African American poet and author, and assisted him by reviewing his work and suggesting changes. In a letter to Power on December 31, 1931, Hughes thanked her "for the splendid little introduction" she wrote for his book of poems, The Dream Keeper. In 1932, Ella McGregor of the American Library Association's Committee on Library Work with Children, asked Power for the name of someone who would might be interested in writing an article for the 1932 Children's Library Yearbook. Power suggested Hughes write the article. The subject of the yearbook article was "the book needs of the Negro children in the South.". Power even wrote the introductory paragraph to Hughes' article in the Yearbook in order to promote awareness of his work as an author.

Power's feminist views also came out in her writing, with Florence M. Everson, in their 1928 book, Early Days in Ohio: A story of a pioneer family of the Western Reserve:

"Girls can't chop anything." said James scornfully.
"They haven't the right swing with their arms," added Alonzo.
"Here's one girl that can do as much as any two boys," declared Peggy as she seized a hatchet, and she swung it with so much vim that James and Alonzo stood back and gazed at her in open-mouthed wonder."

== Legacy ==
When the American Library Association sought to create a text book on youth services in children's libraries, they called upon Power to write it. In 1930, the American Library Association published Library Service for Children. This text served as the first publication of its kind and demonstrated Power's preeminence in the field of children's librarianship. After years of producing pamphlets, articles, and book lists, Power was honored with this commission. In 1943, an update to the book was released and the title was changed to Work with Children in Public Libraries.

== Later years ==
Power worked for the Cleveland Public Library from 1895–1909 and from 1920 until her retirement in 1937. Power also taught at various schools and worked in libraries including the Carnegie Library in Pittsburgh, PA, the Carnegie Library School, and the St. Louis Public Library. After Power retired in 1937, Columbia University offered her a position; she lectured there for two years before retiring to Pompano Beach, Florida. Power became active in Pompano Beach's library system where she helped appropriate funds to rebuild a library that had been decimated in a hurricane many years earlier. She finally retired in 1948 and moved back to Pennsylvania, where she lived until her death on October 8, 1969.

== Selected works ==
- A List of Books for Girls (1930) New York: The H.W. Wilson Company.
- Bag O'Tales: A Source Book for Story-Tellers (1934) New York: E.P. Dutton & Co., Inc.
- Blue Caravan Tales (Unknown) Unknown.
- Early days in Ohio: A story of a Pioneer Family of the Western Reserve (1928) written with F.M. Everson. New York: E.P. Dutton & Co., Inc.
- Library Service for Children (1930) Chicago: American Library Association.
- Lists of Stories & Programs for Story Hours Editor, (1915) White Plains: The H.W. Wilson Company.
- Osceola Buddy, a Florida Farm Mule (1941) New York: E.P. Dutton & Co., Inc.
- Stories to Shorten the Road Compiler, (1936) New York: E.P. Dutton & Co., Inc.
- Work with Children in Public Libraries (1943) Chicago: American Library Association.

== Bibliography ==
- Berneis, Regina F. (n.d.) Power, Effie Louise. Miller, Marilyn Lea. (editor). (2003). Pioneers and leaders in library services to youth - A Biographical Dictionary. Libraries Unlimited. ISBN 1-59158-028-5.
- Cleveland Public Library Archives. (1937) Photograph of Effie Louise Power. Retrieved from http://cplorg.cdmhost.com/cdm4/item_viewer.php?CISOROOT=/p4014coll13&CISOPTR=174 on May 27, 2009
- Children's Library Work Puts Her With Who's Who. "Cleveland Plain Dealer", January 3, 1927, provided by Cleveland Public Library Archives.
- Cramer, C.H. (1972) Open shelves and open minds: A history of the Cleveland Public Library. Cleveland, OH: The Press of Case Western Reserve University. ISBN 0-8295-0219-X.
- Hughes, L. Personal letter to E. L. Power from Langston Hughes. December 31, 1931. Cleveland Public Library Image Collections. Retrieved from http://cplorg.cdmhost.com/cdm4/document.php?CISOROOT=/p4014coll13&CISOPTR=455&REC=1 on May 27, 2009.
- Jenkins, Christine A. (2000). The history of youth services librarianship: a review of the research literature. Libraries & Culture, 35.1, 103(40).
- Kimball, M., Jenkins, C., & Hearne, B. (2004). Effie Louise Power: Librarian, Educator, Author. Library Trends, Vol. 52, No. 4, 924–951.
- Kingsbury, Mary E. (n.d.). Power, Effie Louise. Wedgeworth, Robert, editor, (1993). World Encyclopedia of library and information services, 3rd edition. American Libraries Association. ISBN 0-8389-0609-5.
- Power, E.L. Personal letter to Langston Hughes. January 20, 1932. Cleveland Public Library Image Collections. Retrieved from http://cplorg.cdmhost.com/cdm4/document.php?CISOROOT=/p4014coll13&CISOPTR=455&REC=1 on May 27, 2009.
- The Encyclopedia of Cleveland History (n.d.). Retrieved from http://ech.case.edu/ech-cgi/article.pl?id=PEL on May 16, 2009.
