= Adam Strohm =

Swedish-American librarian

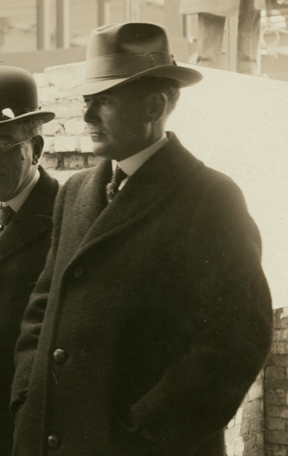
- Strohm in 1917

President of the American Library Association
- In office 1930–1931
- Preceded by: Adam Keogh
- Succeeded by: Josephine Adams Rathbone

Personal details
- Born: Adam Julius Strohm; February 16, 1870 Vänersborg, Västergötland, Sweden
- Died: October 30, 1951 (aged 81) Fletcher, North Carolina, USA
- Cause of death: Heart attack
- Education: Uppsala University; University of Illinois
- Occupation: Librarian

Adam Julius Strohm (February 16, 1870 – October 30, 1951) was a Swedish-American librarian. He was born in Vänersborg, Sweden and came to the United States in 1892. He was educated at the University of Uppsala, Sweden, and the University of Illinois. Strohm served as chief librarian of the Detroit Public Library from 1912 until his retirement in 1941. Prior to moving to Detroit, he served as librarian at the University of Illinois.

He was recognized as a pioneer of introducing branch libraries to public libraries. Strohm served as president of the American Library Association from 1930 to 1931.

Strohm died after a heart attack in Asheville, North Carolina.

== Publications ==
- Bibliography of Cooperative Cataloguing and the Printing of Catalogue Cards (1903)
- Efficiency of the Library Staff and Scientific Management Bulletin of the American Library Association, V. 6 (1912)

Non-profit organization positions
Preceded by Adam Keogh	President of the American Library Association; 1930–1931	Succeeded by Josephine Adams Rathbone
