= Harry M. Lydenberg =

American librarian, author and book conservationist

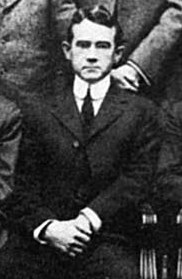
- Lydenberg in 1919

President of the American Library Association
- In office 1932–1933
- Preceded by: Josephine Adams Rathbone
- Succeeded by: Gratia A. Countryman

Personal details
- Born: Harry Miller Lydenberg; November 18, 1874 Dayton, Ohio, US
- Died: April 16, 1960 (aged 85)
- Education: Harvard University
- Occupation: Librarian

Harry Miller Lydenberg (November 18, 1874 – April 16, 1960) was an American librarian, author and book conservationist. He is best known for his decades-long career as a librarian and eventual director for the New York Public Library, American liaison to the international library community, as well as one of the 100 most important library innovators of the 20th century. His written works describe his preferred library reference, collection and conservation practices, as well as his knowledge of the New York Public Library.

== Early life ==
Harry Miller Lydenberg was born in Dayton, Ohio. As highlighted in Phyllis Dain's biographical and historical account of Lydenberg's life, entitled, "Harry M. Lydenberg and American library resources: a study in modern library leadership", his early life necessitated that he learn what it meant to make do with very little and to conserve resources. As Lydenberg would be heard to quote later in his life, "Libraries as well as individuals must adjust themselves to circumstances, and will see their ideals affected by the conditions under which they try to realize those ideals." As he applied these words to his career and work, so too did these words encompass the way Harry Lydenberg lived his life, from his youth through his career. One of his earliest jobs, delivering newspapers, set the stage for what would be a long career working with the written word, and the mechanics of printing. In his later teen years, Lydenberg worked as a page for the Dayton Public Library, eventually going on to attend Harvard, where he continued to work in the college library, gaining knowledge of library organization and the importance of a well tended library collection. He graduated a year early in 1896 from his four-year program, while simultaneously earning the title of magna cum laude.

== New beginnings at the New York Public Library ==
Upon graduating, Lydenberg gained employment with the New York Public Library (NYPL). The director, John Shaw Billings, took notice of Lydenberg's demonstrated dedication to the library field. According to Dain and verified by the 1916 Handbook of the New York Public Library, NYPL was experiencing a major consolidation, as the Lennox and Astor Libraries, through private endowments and the Tilden Trust, were merged to create the "new corporation" called the "New York Public Library, Astor, Lennox and Tilden Foundation". Lydenberg became Shaw's personal assistant as well as the head of reference. He and Shaw, along with the library's other main figure, Assistant Director Edwin H. Anderson saw the library through its early years after the consolidation.

== Career advancements ==
Lydenberg was promoted to Assistant Director in 1928. One of his main goals included building a collection that was based upon need and usability rather than quantity of ownership. In a speech entitled, “Interrelation of Medical and Public Libraries”, given to the Medical Library Association, Lydenberg exemplifies this collection development philosophy. When addressing the specific selection of medical books for NYPL, he warned against retaining or purchasing every book on medicine. Instead he added only those medical books that were interdisciplinary, and encompassed other fields of knowledge. He knew there were plenty of medical institutions that contained purely technical books, and therefore it was not necessary to have them in the public library's collection. Thus, he was able meet the research needs of his patrons without accumulating materials already available in other institutions. Lydenberg goes on to address in his essay, “The opportunity beckons loud here to demonstrate how necessary is the cooperation between the general and special collection.” Another of Lydenberg's areas of expertise was the preservation of books. According to his colleague, Keyes Metcalf, he oversaw multiple studies pertaining to such subjects as general conservation, paper and leather selection and temperature control. Additionally, he authored several books on these subjects, one of the most notable being, The Care and repair of books, which he co-authored with John Archer, who was then head of NYPL's printing office Lydenberg is quoted in his own chapter of The Wonderful World of Books, (entitled, “Library Work as a Profession”) as advising:

Every Librarian will tell you the biggest part of his work is to learn all he can about the making of books; the more he knows about it, the better we will know how to help others learn what books can do for them.

— Harry Lydenberg

He and Archer are also credited with the generous use of early photocopying technology and color printing.

He served as President of the Bibliographical Society of America from 1929-1931.

== Major accomplishments ==
Lydenberg became the Director of NYPL in 1934. This followed his year as president of the American Library Association from 1931–1932. He continued to see NYPL not only through the issues unique to the management of a large urban library, but also through years war recovery and economic uncertainty. His tenure lasted until his retirement in 1941.

For two years after, he served as director of Biblioteca Benjamín Franklin in Mexico City, Mexico. Lydenberg also held the position of the director of the Board of International Relations of the American Library Association from 1943–1946. His years as director of NYPL had prepared him well for this position, as it was a time when the United States (and most specifically public institutions) was collectively experiencing a great period of sacrifice and fiscal belt-tightening. He had previously visited Europe post World War I to study book buying and preservation practices. He felt librarians could enhance American library collections and maintenance practices by learning what other counties did with their information and physical books, especially during wartime. He acknowledged in his 1945 essay, “The Library Rehabilitation Programme of the American Library Association”, “Librarians have joyfully agreed that common efforts, concerted action, rather than rampant rivalry, are necessary in connection with future purchases when the time is ripe for what we may call ordinary buying.”

Lydenberg was elected to the American Philosophical Society in 1939. In 1952 he was awarded American Library Association Honorary Membership.

== Remembrance ==
Lydenberg died in 1960 at the age of 86. A collection of essays written by his colleagues entitled, Bookmen’s Holiday: Notes and Studies Written and Gathered in Tribute to Harry Miller Lydenberg about individual experiences in librarianship, was written in honor of his retirement from the New York Public Library, as well as the practice of librarianship in all its forms.

== Selected works ==
Credit for the works listed in this list of selected works is given to George L. McKay, a Manhattan printer and engraver who worked closely with Lydenberg. The complete list of Lydenberg's works, compiled by Mr. McKay, may be found on pages 5–26 of the 1943 edition of Bookmen's Holiday: notes and studies written and gathered in tribute to Harry Miller Lydenberg.

Books

- History of the New York Public Library, Astor, Lenox and Tilden Foundations. New York: New York Public Library. 1923. This book is a collection and rewrite of a series of articles which appeared in the Bulletin of the New York Public Library:
  - "A History of the New York Public Library: Part I: The Astor Library". Bulletin of the New York Public Library. 20: 555–584. July 1916.
  - "A History of the New York Public Library: Part II: The Astor Library (continued)". Bulletin of the New York Public Library. 20: 623–660. August 1916.
  - "A History of the New York Public Library: Part III: The Lenox Library". Bulletin of the New York Public Library. 20: 685–707. September 1916.
  - "A History of the New York Public Library: Part IV: The Tilden Trust". Bulletin of the New York Public Library. 21: 71–80. February 1917.
  - "A History of the New York Public Library: Part V: The New York Free Circulating Library". Bulletin of the New York Public Library. 21: 215–236. April 1917.
  - "A History of the New York Public Library: Chapter V: The Harlem Library". Bulletin of the New York Public Library. 24: 587–616. November 1920. With a biographical appendix.
  - "A History of the New York Public Library: Chapter XV: Consolidation". Bulletin of the New York Public Library. 25: 3–38. January 1921.
  - "A History of the New York Public Library: Chapter XVI: New Wine in Old Bottles, 1895-1911". Bulletin of the New York Public Library. 25: 123–153. March 1921.
  - "A History of the New York Public Library: Chapter XVII: The Circulation Department". Bulletin of the New York Public Library. 25: 307–320. May 1921.
  - "A History of the New York Public Library: Chapter XVIII: Life in the New Building, 1911-1920". Bulletin of the New York Public Library. 25: 427–441. July 1921.
  - "A History of the New York Public Library: Chapter XIX: The Central Building, 1897-1911". Bulletin of the New York Public Library. 25: 495–530. August 1921.
  - "A History of the New York Public Library: Chapter XIX (continued): The Central Building, 1897-1911 (continued)". Bulletin of the New York Public Library. 25: 579–634. September 1921. With a statistical appendix.
- The Care and repair of books
- Paper or sawdust: a plea for good paper for good books
- John Shaw Billings and the New York Public Library

Essays and Articles

- "Reference work in the New York Public Library."
- "Russian libraries today."
- "Saving the newspaper files for posterity."
- "Responsibility of the library to continue the literary tradition."
- "Librarians and educators: a librarian's view of both."

== Notes ==
Non-profit organization positions
| Preceded by Josephine Adams Rathbone | President of the American Library Association; 1932–1933 | Succeeded by Gratia A. Countryman |
