= Josephine Adams Rathbone =

American librarian, library educator and author

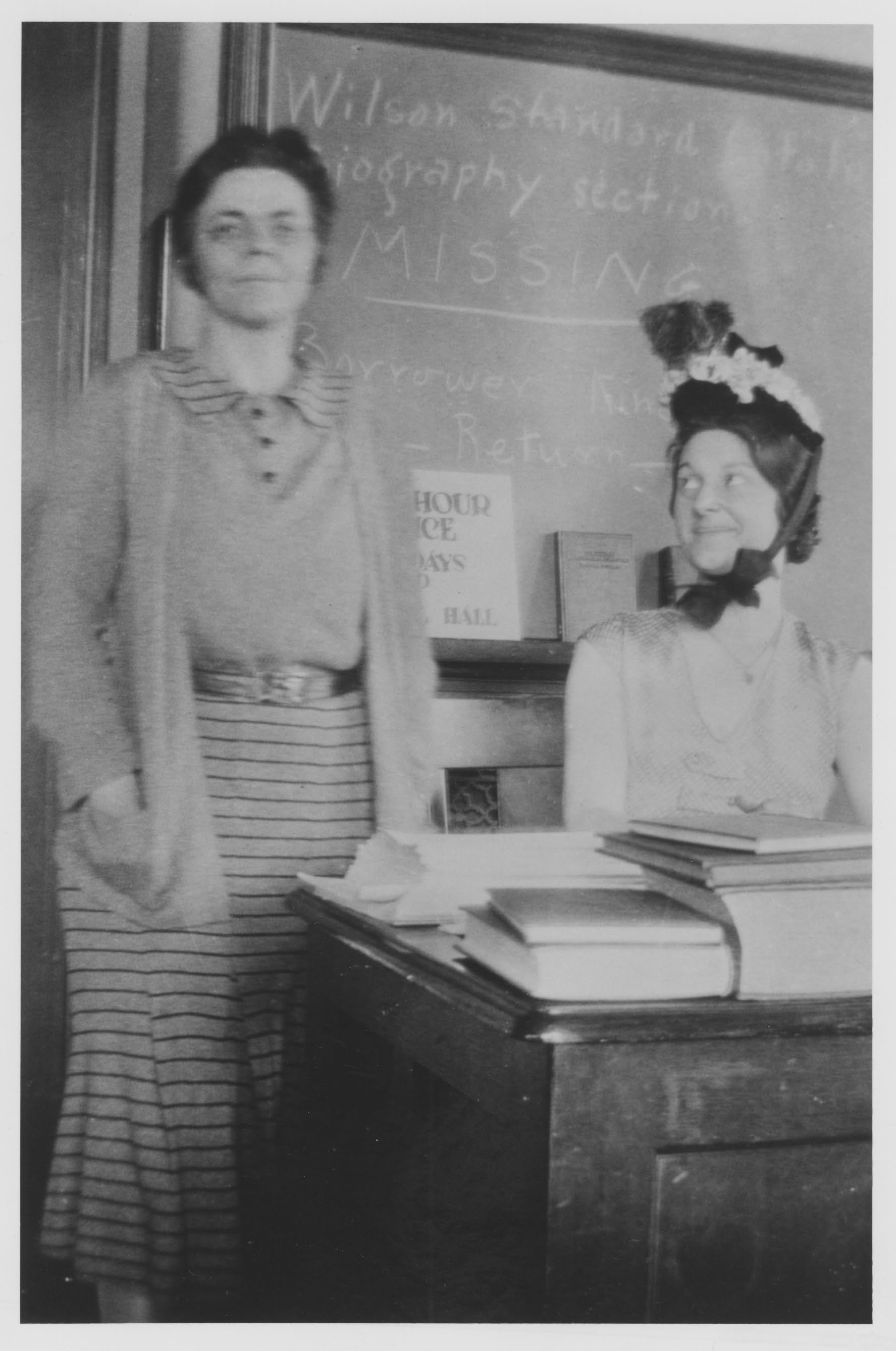
- Josephine Adams (right) pokes fun of the staid image of her respected instructor, Josephine Adams Rathbone (left). Pratt Institute, Brooklyn, NY, 1931.

President of the American Library Association
- In office 1931–1932
- Preceded by: Adam Strohm
- Succeeded by: Harry Miller Lydenberg

Personal details
- Born: Josephine Adams Rathbone; September 10, 1864 New York, US
- Died: May 17, 1941 (aged 76) Augusta, Georgia
- Education: University of Michigan
- Occupation: Librarian

Josephine Adams Rathbone (September 10, 1864 – May 17, 1941) was a librarian, library educator, author, and president of the American Library Association in 1931–1932. She was born in Jamestown, New York. She began her studies at the University of Michigan from 1887 to 1891, then moved to New York where she graduated from the New York State Library School in 1893 earning a B.L.S. After working for two years as an assistant cataloger at the Pratt Institute Free Library she was appointed "chief instructor" at the Pratt Institute Library School in 1895 under Mary Wright Plummer. When Plummer went to the New York Public Library to establish its Training Class in 1911, Rathbone was appointed vice-director of the Pratt Institute school, a position she held until she retired in 1938.

Rathbone was active in state and local professional associations serving as secretary of the New York State Library Association and president of the New York Library Club. In 1931–1932 she was president of the American Library Association (ALA).

She remained single her entire life and had no children. An active woman, she enjoyed traveling and attending the theater, in addition to outdoor pleasures such as tree planting, canoeing and mountain climbing. After her retirement from the Pratt library school, she moved to Augusta, Georgia, her mother's hometown, and moved into a house there with a cousin. She joined the Philomathic Club and the Colonial Dames of America, and "learned how to drive her newly purchased automobile."

Rathbone died in Augusta of coronary thrombosis at the age of 76 on May 17, 1941.

== Bibliography ==
- Libraries to See in Greater New York Wisconsin Library Bulletin, Volume 12. February, 1916. pages 53–58
- Viewpoints in Travel; An Arrangement of Books According to Their Essential Interest. Chicago: American library Association Pub. board, 1919.
- Shelf Department. Chicago: American Library Association Pub. board, 1918.

Non-profit organization positions
Preceded by Adam Strohm	President of the American Library Association; 1931–1932	Succeeded by Harry Miller Lydenberg
