= Carl B. Roden =

American librarian

- Roden in 1917

President of the American Library Association
- In office 1927–1928
- Preceded by: George H. Locke
- Succeeded by: Linda A. Eastman

Personal details
- Born: Carl Bismarck Roden; June 7, 1871 Kansas City, Missouri, US
- Died: October 25, 1956 (aged 85) Palatine, Illinois, US
- Occupation: Librarian

Carl Bismarck Roden (June 7, 1871 – October 25, 1956) was an American librarian and served as chief librarian of the Chicago Public Library from 1918 to 1950. A lifelong resident of Norwood Park, Illinois, he began work as a library page in 1886.

== Career ==
Under his leadership, the Chicago Public Library system doubled its reach in the community and tripled the number of books it offered. Circulation from branch libraries doubled and the community support for the Public Libraries increased four-fold.

During his tenure, Chicago Public Library's Board of Directors authorized the first intellectual freedom policy in an American public Library. The April 1936 action responded to challenges from community members of Russian and Polish descent regarding the collections provided by the Chicago Public Library's Foreign Language Department.

Responding to findings in the study by faculty at University of Chicago Graduate Library School published as The Metropolitan Library in Action (1940) Roden hired Lowell A. Martin as his executive assistant to implement suggested changes.

Roden was a participant in the Bibliographical Society of Chicago, forerunner of the Bibliographical Society of America, for which he served as president from 1914-1916. Roden was president of the American Library Association from 1927 to 1928.

He was a member of the Caxton Club of Chicago.

== Death ==
Carl Bismark Roden died in 1956.

== Bibliography ==
- “The Library as a Censor of Books,” in Proceedings of the Illinois Library Association, October 19–21 (Springfield: Illinois Library Association, 1922), 167.
- “Standards for the Public Library Book Collection,” in The Library of Tomorrow: A Symposium, ed. Emily M. Danton (Chicago: American Library Association, 1939), 94.
- Library for the People Episode 3: Of Book Bans and Book Sanctuaries. Chicago Public Library.
- Rodin, Carl B. (October 1950). "The Public Library in the Political Process: A Report of the Public Library Inquiry". The Library Quarterly. 20 (4): 302–304. doi:10.1086/617760.

== See also ==
- intellectual freedom

Non-profit organization positions
Preceded by George H. Locke	President of the American Library Association; 1927–1928	Succeeded by Linda A. Eastman
