= Biblioteca Benjamín Franklin =

Library in Mexico City, Mexico

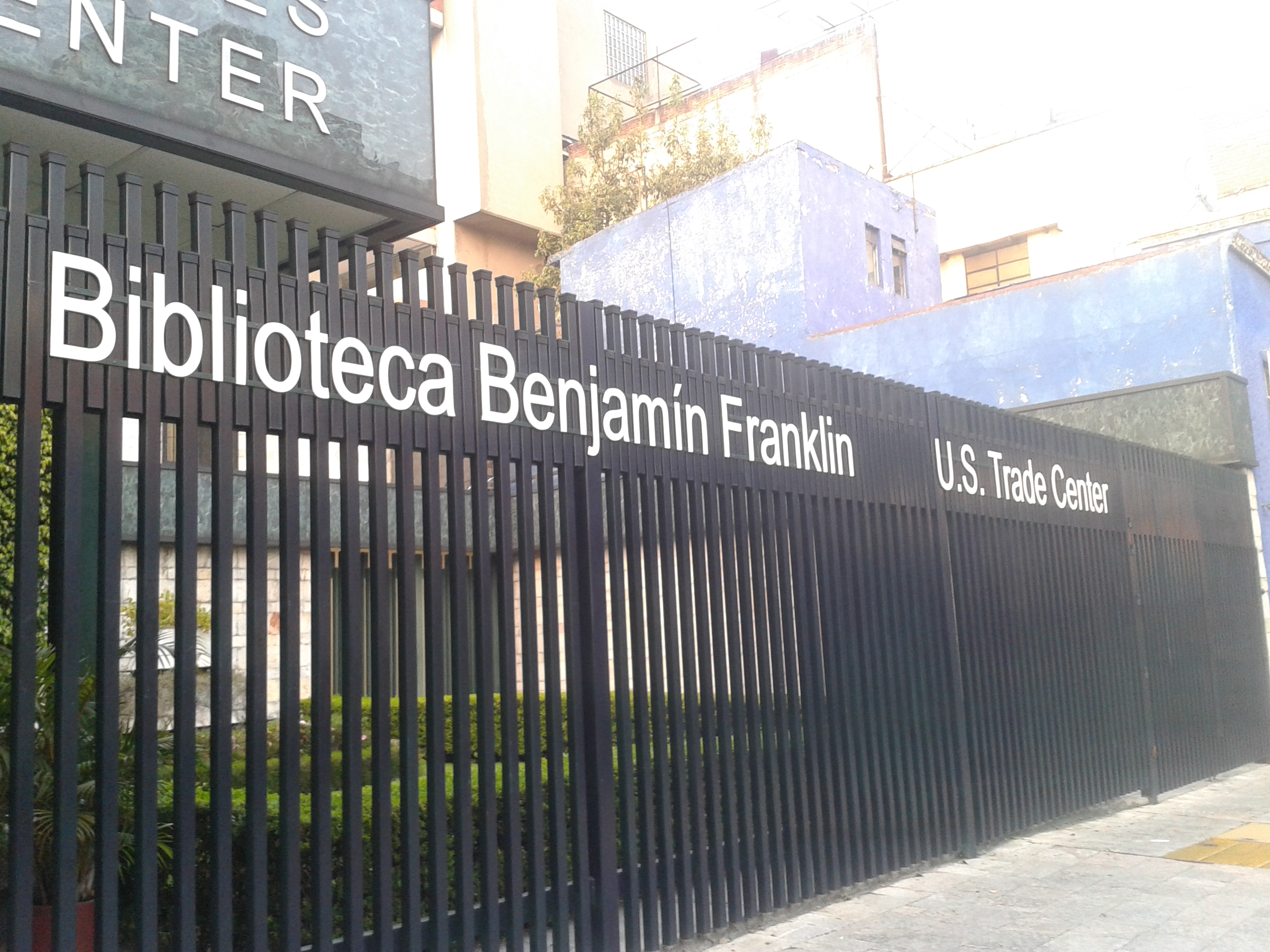
- Biblioteca Benjamín Franklin in Mexico City
- 19.4276°N 99.1578°W
- Location: Colonia Juárez, Mexico City, Mexico
- Type: Public library
- Established: 1942; 84 years ago

Other information
- Website: mx.usembassy.gov/benjamin-franklin-library/

The Biblioteca Benjamín Franklin is the Official Information Center of the United States Embassy in Mexico. The library provides the usual services expected of libraries such as lending material, providing reference and research assistance, storytimes, and conversation clubs. The library was named after Franklin to commemorate his statesmanship, humanitarianism, and friendship with the intention of fostering collaboration and understanding between the two countries.

== History ==
The Biblioteca Benjamín Franklin was built with an $80,000 grant from the American Library Association and was dedicated on April 13, 1942 and was located at Av. Reforma # 34. At the dedication ceremony, the President of the Republic of Mexico, General Avila Camacho spoke to the importance of this library and the value to society, stating "Every well-organized library is an international society in which countries are represented by those illustrious plenipotentiaries who are the scholars, the poets, the thinkers, the novelists, or in other words the representatives of the spirit of a nation".

When the public library was established, it had between 3,500 and 4,000 volumes, almost all in English, a problem acknowledged when the library was rededicated on July 25, 1968 and had grown to 90,000 with a quarter of them being in Spanish. In September 1942, Harry M. Lydenberg, director of the Biblioteca, wrote the article "Why a North American Library in Mexico?" and provided two primary reasons for such an endeavor "number one, because the European market is closed. Number two, because independently of that, Mexico has been turning more and more towards the United States as a source of mutual intercourse in things intellectual or cultural".

In 1952, the library had a second building located at Nice Street # 53. In 1968, the library moved again to London Street #16. A re-dedication ceremony was held in 1968, where attendees were treated to demonstrations of advances in technologies available for libraries including microfiche and copy machines, video recordings, and "high-fidelity chromographic reproductions" that would be available to the public.

2003 was the latest relocation of the library to Liverpool 31, where it still provides traditional library services, along with guided tours, tech services for building English language skills, movie nights, 3-D printing services, and karaoke.

The library has the EducationUSA advising center, which offers professional educational advising services to students. The main focus is having an academic exchange between Mexico and the USA.
