= Eleanor Edwards Ledbetter =

American lirbariab

Eleanor Edwards Ledbetter

Eleanor Edwards Ledbetter (1870–1954) was a librarian at the Broadway Branch of the Cleveland Public Library during the Progressive Era and the Great Depression. She is considered one of the first librarians to advocate for multiculturalism instead of Americanism. Ledbetter also focused on providing multilingual materials to the immigrants who used her library. She served as chair of the American Library Association's Committee on Work with the Foreign Born. Ledbetter is also recognized for the work she did translating Czech folktales.

== Works ==
- The Slovaks of Cleveland: With Some General Information on the Race (1918)
- The Czechs of Cleveland
- The Polish Immigrant And His Reading
- The Jugoslavs of Cleveland, with a Brief Sketch of Their Historical and Political Backgrounds
