= Felton Thomas Jr. =

Executive director of Cleveland Public Library

- Education: University of Nevada, Las Vegas (BA); University of Hawaiʻi at Mānoa (MA)
- Occupations: Librarian, executive director
- Employer: Cleveland Public Library
- Awards: American Library Association Equality Award; Homer C. Wadsworth Award

Felton Thomas Jr. is an American librarian and executive director of the Cleveland Public Library system. Additionally, Thomas served as the 2016–2017 president of the Public Library Association. He has also served as the chair of the board of directors for the Digital Public Library of America. In 2020, Thomas earned the American Library Association Equality Award, and in 2023, he earned the Homer C. Wadsworth Award.

== Early life and education ==
Thomas grew up in West Las Vegas with six siblings. He worked as a page for the Las Vegas–Clark County Library District at the age of 13.

Thomas graduated from the University of Nevada, Las Vegas with a degree in psychology. He later earned a master's in library science from the University of Hawaiʻi at Mānoa in Honolulu.

== Career ==
Before becoming the executive director of the Cleveland Public Library system, Thomas directed Regional Branch Services for the Las Vegas–Clark County Library District and served as the president of the Nevada Library Association.

In 2009, Thomas became the executive director of the Cleveland Public Library system. His leadership led to the Facilities Master Plan, a decade-long initiative to renovate and/or rebuild the system's 27 libraries, as well as other initiatives surrounding education, technology, and economic growth.

Thomas then became a board member for the Public Library Association in 2012, having served on many of its committees since 2006 including the 2007 National Conference Program Committee and the 2010 Annual Conference Program Coordinating Committee. In 2013, Thomas was one of 20 members named to the Aspen Institute's Task Force on Learning and the Internet. The same year, he was the chair of the Demco New Leaders Travel Grant Jury.

In 2015, Thomas was elected to be the 2016–2017 president of the Public Library Association. During his time as president, Thomas created the Task Force on Equity, Diversion, Inclusion and Social Justice, which became a permanent committee for the organization in 2020. Thomas also led the Inclusive Internship Initiative to place teenagers into internships at libraries. In a duration of five years, the initiative placed 198 students into internships with 119 libraries across 44 states. In 2016, Thomas was additionally named one of 10 Champions of Change for Making by the Obama administration.

In 2020, Thomas was profiled by Cleveland Magazine for its Most Interesting People 2020 series. In the same year, he was named in Crain's Cleveland Business' Power 150 series. In 2023, Thomas was awarded with the Homer C. Wadsworth Award by the Cleveland Foundation for his "initiatives aimed at addressing community needs in the areas of access to technology, education, and economic development." In the same year, the board of trustees for the Cleveland Public Library system unanimously voted to renew his five-year contract as executive director. One year later, in 2024, Thomas received the American Library Association Equality Award. He has also served on the American Library Association's Chapter Relations Committee.

Thomas has been called a "Mover and Shaker" by Library Journal. Additionally, he serves on the boards of FRONT International, United Way of Greater Cleveland, University Circle Inc., the Cleveland Museum of Art, and other organizations. Thomas' writing has appeared in Crain's Cleveland Business, American Libraries, and Cleveland.com.

== Controversies ==
In 2019, Cleveland Public Library embarked on an ambitious $100 million plan to renovate all 27 neighborhood branches plus the main library. Despite widespread public support, the implementation of the facilities master plan has been plagued by delays, construction quality issues, and costs that have far exceeded initial estimates. The construction of the new Martin Luther King, Jr. branch, initially estimated to cost $10 million, has exceeded over $21.5 million dollars and counting.

In 2023, Cleveland Public Library's former Director of Inclusion and Leadership Training, Twyla Turner, sued the library for racial discrimination. The library agreed to pay Turner $120,000 to settle the lawsuit. According to Turner, Thomas had warned her to "watch out" for a Cleveland Public Library employee who "did not support diversity, equity, and inclusion." Turner alleged this employee then went on to create a hostile working environment by filing numerous complaints against her and that, despite Thomas's initial warning, he and Cleveland Public Library did not protect her.

Thomas's initial salary in 2009 as executive director of the Cleveland Public Library was $165,000. As of 2026, Thomas's salary has ballooned to $306,000, an increase of over 85%. During this same time period, union employees were subject to an eleven-year wage freeze and the hourly pay of Children's Librarians has actually decreased.
