= Marilla Waite Freeman =

American librarian

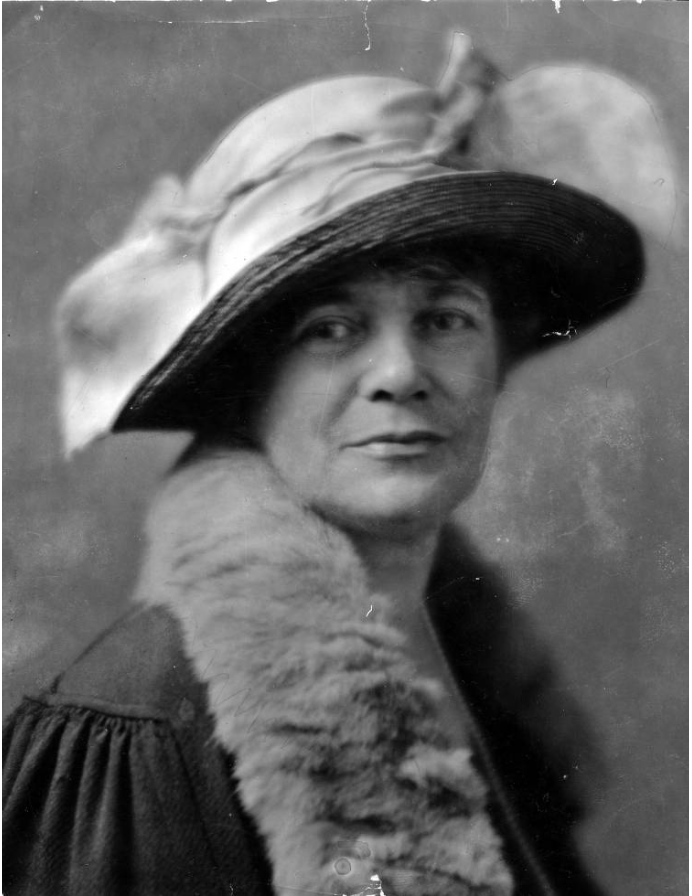
- Born: February 21, 1871; Honeoye Falls
- Died: October 29, 1961 (aged 90); White Plains
- Education: University of Chicago
- Occupation: Librarian
- Employer: Cleveland Public Library

Marilla Waite Freeman (February 21, 1871 – October 29, 1961) was a prominent librarian known for her innovative ideas in library service. At the time of her retirement from the Cleveland Public Library in 1940, she was "one of the best known and most beloved librarians in the country."

== Family ==
Marilla Waite Freeman's father, Rev. Samuel Alden Freeman was a descendant of John Alden, and the family of her mother, Sarah Jane Allen, could be traced back to Miles Standish.

Freeman is reported to have been born on February 21, 1871; however, this date is only an approximation. According to the book Open Shelves, Open Minds, her birthdate "can be ascertained only from personnel and pension records at the Cleveland Public Library" since Freeman was "reticent about her age, kept it a secret, and gave no date of birth in the many biographical sketches that were published." Other sources suggest a birth date of 1870.

== Education and career ==
Freeman began her career as a staff member of the University of Chicago library while a student there, and she joined the American Library Association in 1893. She graduated from the university in 1897 with a Ph.B. degree in literature. Her first position after graduating was as a Library Assistant at the Newberry Library in Chicago under the direction of William F. Poole. Freeman took a course of study at the New York State Library in 1900 to officially become a librarian.

Freeman was credited with having created in the public mind a representation of the librarian quite separate from the stereotypical librarian of the day. With a dramatic personality, critics sometimes called her a prima donna. She was described as being: outspoken, having beautiful features, unorthodox in management, Catholic in attitudes and literary tastes, worldly in experience, with many interests from libraries, law, to poetry.

Freeman's Cleveland Public Library's office reflected neither goodness or calmness. There was substantial bustle in and around it, so much that the head of the adjacent Literature Department moved her desk as far away as the limit would allow. "Am I talking to loud?" Freeman once inquired to a patron. She added: "You know, I haven't a library voice."

Freeman organized the creation of the small public library in Michigan City, Indiana and also served as the first director of the Davenport Public Library in Iowa in October 1902. She left Davenport in February 1905 to take a position as Head of the Reference Department at the Louisville Free Public Library upon its opening. In June 1908, Freeman was granted a leave of absence from the library to deliver nine lectures at the New York State Library School on the organization and administration of small public libraries. Freeman resigned from Louisville Free Public Library in March 1910 to accept a position at the Free Public Library of Newark in New Jersey.

During World War I in 1918, Freeman was in charge of the base hospital library at Camp Dix, New Jersey.

After a year of serving in Newark, Freeman left to go to the Goodwyn Institute Library in Memphis, Tennessee. The University of Memphis held law classes at night in the Goodwyn Institute building, and Freeman took advantage of this. She received an LL.B. degree in June 1921 from the university and passed the state examination with honors. Although she was admitted to the Tennessee bar and had a license to practice law, she stated at the time that she had "no present intention of doing so." However, Freeman did work in the foreign law department of Harvard Law Library from 1921 to 1922.

After her time at Harvard, Freeman served as Head Librarian of the Cleveland Public Library's Main Library from 1922 to July 1, 1940, and created the library's readers advisory service and coordinated the library's active cooperation with community organizations and its response to the adult education movement. Just two years after she began at the library, she was instrumental in significantly increasing usage through the use of posters, displays, and bookmarks. The bookmarks were designed to complement movies, plays, and symphonies presented around the city with printing costs borne by the theaters. She began this project with a bookmark listing 15 titles connected to the French Revolution to coincide with the release of Scaramouche. Eventually, the print run for a bookmark for a single performance could be as high as 45,000, being distributed throughout the city at the library, women's clubs, and venues where the performances took place.

At Cleveland Public Library, Freeman also helped created the business information department, a standard of its type throughout the country.

Freeman also had a love of poetry and brought a number of poets to Cleveland for readings including Countee Cullen, Langston Hughes, Robert Frost, William Butler Yeats, and John Masefield, the poet laureate of England. In fact, Masefield, in a radio address on May 12, 1937, mentioned Freeman by name:

I shall never forget going to a city library in Memphis, Tennessee, and seeing a big and beautiful room for the use of the youth of the city which had been arranged by Miss Freeman, who now directs your great library at Cleveland, Ohio.

Freeman and King George VI were the only two people Masefield mentioned by name in that address.

In 1941, her baccalaureate alma mater, the University of Chicago, awarded her their Distinguished Service Medal for her work in librarianship.

Freeman was a long-time member of the American Library Association, where she served as First Vice-President from 1923–1924, as well as a member of the Ohio Library Association and the Poetry Society of America. Freeman served as Chair of the American Library Association's Motion Picture Review Committee from 1949 to 1952. Freeman's prolific writing career spanned decades and she contributed articles to Library Journal from July 1899 until late summer 1959. In Cleveland, Freeman served as president of the Library Club of Cleveland and was engaged in the Women's City Club.

The writer Floyd Dell is quoted in Freeman's obituary as stating that he "caught a glimpse of mountaintops" through Freeman's inspiration. Dell dedicated a number of poems and novels to her. Freeman was instrumental in encouraging Dell's career as a writer. In fact, Freeman served as the model for the librarian character, Helen Raymond, in Dell's first successful novel, Moon-Calf.

After her retirement from Cleveland Public Library, Freeman became librarian of the St. Joseph's Tuberculosis Hospital in the Bronx, New York.

== Freeman's philosophy of librarianship ==
In an essay written by Freeman for Library Journal in February 1911 entitled The Psychological Moment, she took librarians to task for making sure they served the public in a timely, professional manner. The essay would turn out to be a best-seller in the library profession and become required reading for students in library school. Freeman laid out the case for quality service this way:

We want to do what we want when we want to, and we want other people to want what we think they ought to... Then we expect the meek and docile public to fit into their appointed places in our system, and being just normal, unsystematized humans, like ourselves really, they don't do it. They either rebel, kick holes in the machinery, and burst through our carefully nailed red-tape fences, or they go away in disgust, and never come again. And whatever happens, we do want them back again, in large and increasing numbers, for they are our only reason for being, and without their presence and approval, all our careful plans and efforts are in vain.

The essay included several examples of quality service to persons such as "the busy man who comes hurriedly in some noon, on his way to lunch, and wanted to know if we have anything on hydraulics," "a carpenter [who] may desire a certain book on stairbuilding," and "an ambitious teacher [wanting] one [book] on pedagogies." Freeman discussed the "elasticities of rule, much appreciated by the borrower" to get around "as many yards of our red tape as we possibly can." Freeman also saw "no good reason why renewals by telephone should not be allowed," and "another use of the telephone is to notify readers of books received for their use." Freeman also touts the use of government resources as well as local resources like small special libraries and persons with specialized expertise.

Freeman again laid out her general philosophy towards librarianship in a later editorial she wrote for Library Journal in 1938:

I hope and believe that librarians are, as a rule, among the unprejudiced, broad-minded, and broad-sympathied members of society-persons who possess what Sir John Adams, of the University of London, called the most important single quality of the librarian, namely, sympathy, ability to put ones self behind the bar of the eye of the other person, to see, for a moment at least, through the other man's eye. Anyone who does this, he says, or attempts to do it, can avoid ridiculous mistakes. And the ridiculous and often tragic mistake is to see things only through ones own eye, and to act accordingly ....
"How may a librarian remain neutral," I am asked, "and yet not abandon intellectual leadership in a world assailed by 'isms'?" Well, neutral seems to me one of those "afraid" words-negative, colorless, ineffective. Why should a librarian be neutral, forsooth? He has at his very elbow all the material needed to make him intelligent and, as a public official deriving his support from taxation, he owes a peculiar duty to be informed and intelligent, especially in matters of government. A public library is part of the mechanism of modern American local government, with no ivory towers attached, and thoroughgoing intelligence as to all functions of government and all matters in which government is interested-which at the moment seems to be nearly everything-is essential equipment for any streamlined librarian of 1938. Informed intelligence precludes prejudice, recognizes propaganda, weighs all the evidence, cherishes the open mind, treasures its freedom, and steers an even course between neutrality and partisanship ....

== Selected works ==
- Library Administration on an Income of $1000 to $5000 a Year: Economies In Plans and Methods by Marilla Waite Freeman (1905), published by American Library Association Publishing Board.
- The Relation of the Library to the Outside World; or, The Library and Publicity (1908) by Marilla Waite Freeman, contained in The Library Without the Walls: Reprints of Papers and Addresses (1927).
- The Psychological Moment (1911) by Marilla Waite Freeman, published in Library Journal.
- "Human Interest" in the Public Library by Marilla Waite Freeman (1917), published in Library Journal
- The Theory of Play by Marilla Waite Freeman (2008), published by Ediciones El Pozo in Oneonta, New York.
