= Andrew Keogh (librarian) =

English-born American librarian

President of the American Library Association
- In office 1929–1930
- Preceded by: Linda A. Eastman
- Succeeded by: Adam Strohm

Personal details
- Born: November 14, 1869; Newcastle upon Tyne, Northumberland, England
- Died: February 13, 1953 (aged 83)
- Occupation: Librarian

Andrew Keogh (November 14, 1869 – February 13, 1953) was an English-born American librarian.

Keogh started his library career as a librarian with the Newcastle-upon-Tyne Public Library in England from 1892 to 1898. He then became librarian of the Linonia and Brothers Library at Yale University in 1899 and became a reference librarian at the Yale University Library from 1900 to 1916. He was promoted to head librarian at Yale in 1916 and served in that position until his retirement in 1938.

Keogh served as president of the Bibliographical Society of America from 1913 to 1914 and the American Library Association from 1929 to 1930.

Keogh was also a lecturer and professor of bibliography from 1902 to 1938. He cooperated in the establishment of The Bibliographical Press at the library.

Upon his retirement, Keogh was named a Librarian Emeritus at Yale until his death in 1953.

== See also ==
- Yale University Library
- Library science

Non-profit organization positions
Preceded by Linda A. Eastman	President of the American Library Association; 1929–1930	Succeeded by Adam Strohm
