= Linda Eastman =

American librarian (1867–1963)

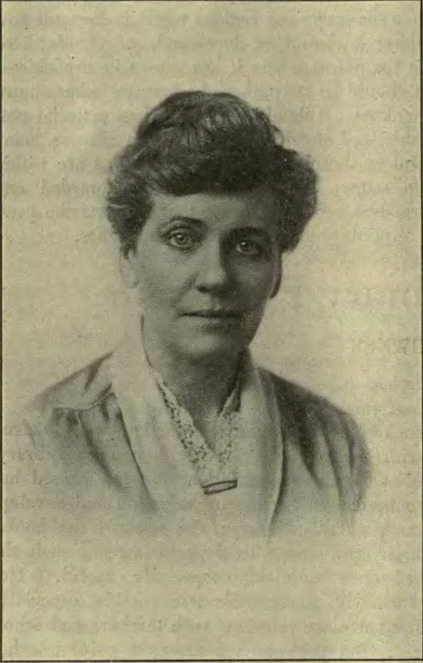
- Eastman in 1920

President of the American Library Association
- In office 1928–1929
- Preceded by: Carl B. Roden
- Succeeded by: Andrew Keogh

Personal details
- Born: Linda Anne Eastman; July 7, 1867 Oberlin, Ohio, US
- Died: April 5, 1963 (aged 95) Cleveland Heights, Ohio, US
- Occupation: Librarian

Linda Anne Eastman (July 7, 1867 – April 5, 1963) was an American librarian. She was selected by the American Library Association (ALA) as one of the 100 most important librarians of the 20th century.

Eastman served as the head Librarian of the Cleveland Public Library from 1918 to 1938 and president of the American Library Association from 1928 to 1929. At the time of her appointment in Cleveland, she was the first woman to head a library system the size of Cleveland's. She was also a founding member and later president of the Ohio Library Association, and a professor of Library Science at Case Western Reserve University.

== Early life and career ==
Eastman was born in Oberlin, Ohio, and moved to Cleveland at age 7. In her biography of her friend and mentor, William Howard Brett, Eastman wrote about an early interaction she had with him that would shape her career. Visiting the Cleveland library to acquire a book she needed for school, Eastman was told by an assistant that the book had been checked out and was unavailable. Brett, who was then head librarian, happened to pass by and overheard this exchange, and immediately offered to have someone go purchase another copy of the book for Eastman to check out. Following high school Eastman became a teacher, but soon decided to pursue library work instead.

Eastman started working at the Cleveland Public Library in 1892 as an apprentice, and in 1894 took charge of the West Side Branch Library, where she established The Open Shelf, a newsletter for library patrons highlighting new releases. Eastman left for a better position in the Dayton Library System in 1895 but returned quickly when Brett offered her the position of vice-Librarian. In that position, Eastman helped implement Brett's revolutionary and highly successful open shelf system, whereby patrons could choose their own titles from library shelves rather than having to ask library staff to retrieve books from restricted stacks.

When Brett was killed in a car crash in 1918, the Cleveland Library Board appointed Eastman head librarian in a unanimous vote.

== Head librarian of Cleveland Public Library ==
=== New main library ===
One of Eastman's major achievements as librarian was overseeing the construction and opening of Cleveland's new main library.

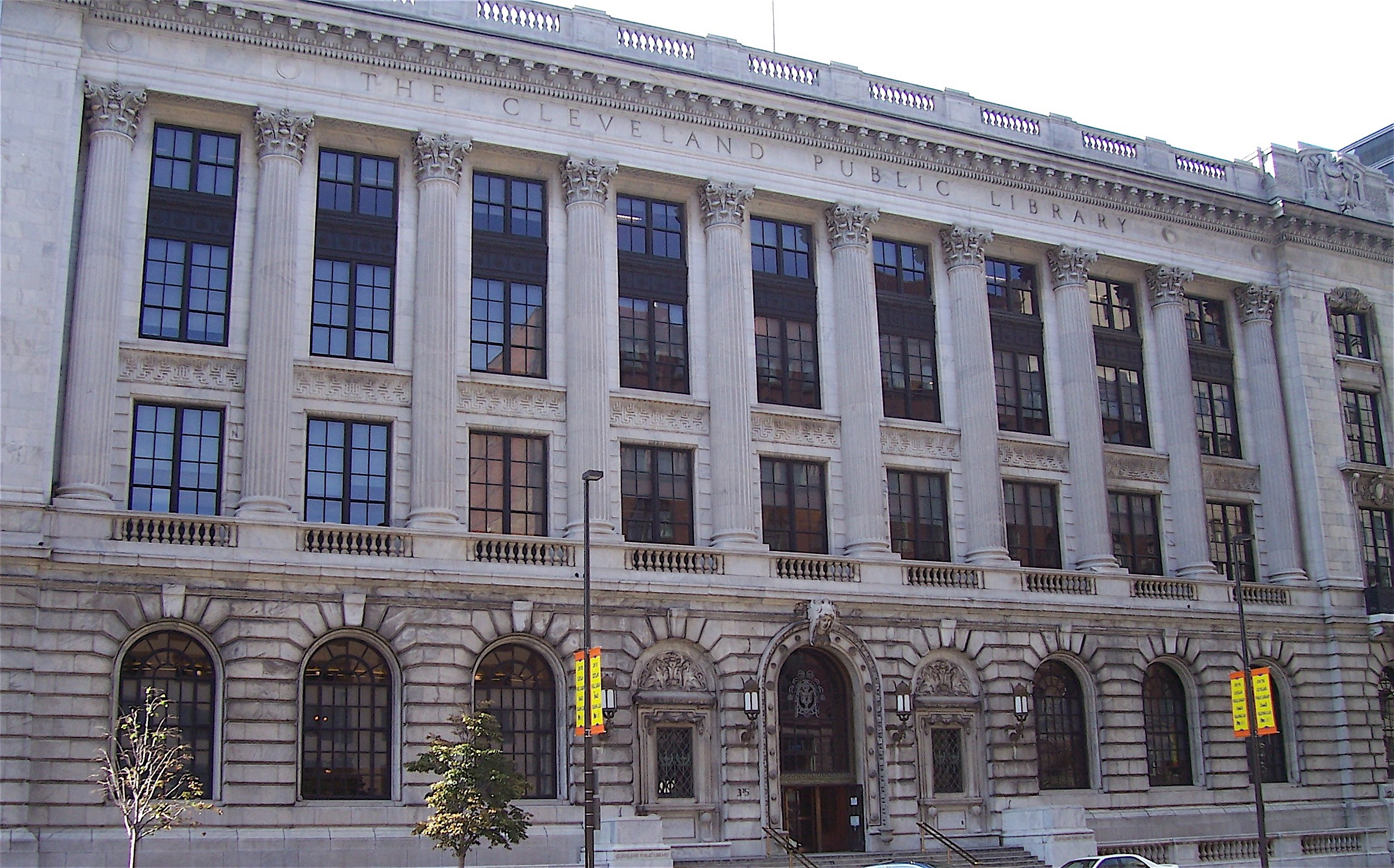
Front entrance to the Cleveland Public Library's central location on Superior Avenue

Plans for the new library began in 1912, but political and financial questions (and World War I) delayed the beginning of construction until 1923, after a series of successful bond initiatives spearheaded by Eastman. The library opened to the public in May 1925 with a grand public event, featuring a main address by former British Prime Minister David Lloyd George. The new building was, at the time, the third largest library in the country, boasting six floors and a main reading room that could seat 200.

=== Special services ===
Eastman helped devise special centers that would serve patrons’ needs for specific sorts of information. The unique Travel Section was established in 1926 and featured not only travel pamphlets, but also "selected volumes on the history, geography, and society of the major countries of the world." In 1928, the Eastman established the Business Information Bureau. This space served not only as a research facility for Cleveland's businesspeople, but also as a vocational resource center. In addition to creating special collections and services, Eastman took steps to extend the reach of the library, establishing in 1926 a service to distribute books to hospitalized readers.

=== Services for blind patrons ===
Eastman's attempts to improve services for blind patrons began in 1903 when she instituted Braille classes as part of the Library's offering. Her attempts to build the library's Braille collection were frustrated by the high price of the books and the difficulty of transporting them, but by 1928 the Library had a collection of six thousand Braille texts. When Eastman retired, the special service was distributing books to thirty thousand blind patrons across northern Ohio. In addition to Braille texts, the Cleveland Library was trailblazing in its use of books recorded on phonograph, initially conceived as a solution for blind patrons who were unable to read Braille.

=== Great Depression ===
The Cleveland Library suffered financial cuts during the 1930s, even as public demand for library services soared. Wages were severely cut and funds for new books dried up. The financial situation got so bad that in 1932 a sign had to be placed in the new book section reading, "No New Books for Display this Week Because of Curtailed Funds. Have You Read These Older Titles?" Nonetheless, library patronage soared as unemployed and underemployed Clevelanders came to the library for a variety of purposes. Eastman told the Chicago Daily Tribune that "many of the unemployed patronizing the library call for reference works which will be of benefit to them in their vocation. They are also calling for books and magazines of general culture, finding that since they have a great deal of time and can now enjoy the books they never had time to read before." Eastman was forced to take extreme cost-cutting measures to keep the library open, aided by widespread public support of the library and appreciation of its services.

== Retirement and legacy ==
Eastman retired from the library in 1938 at age 71, citing a desire to spend more time outdoors. The Plain Dealer summed up the library's condition at the time of her retirement: "She leaves the library the third largest in the United States, with 28 branches, 108 stations, 30 school libraries and ten county libraries administered under the system. Also with a million books on its shelves, a circulation of over eight million a year, and the good will of the entire population of Cleveland, each man, woman and child having been sold the idea that the Public Library is his own private library, to serve him according to his needs".

Following Eastman's retirement, both a branch library and a reading garden at the Main Library were named in her honor.

In 1954 she was awarded American Library Association Honorary Membership.

Eastman died in 1963 at age 95. She is buried at Riverside Cemetery in Cleveland, Ohio.

== Footnotes ==
Non-profit organization positions
Preceded by Carl B. Roden	President of the American Library Association; 1928–1929	Succeeded by Andrew Keogh
