= William Howard Brett =

American librarian

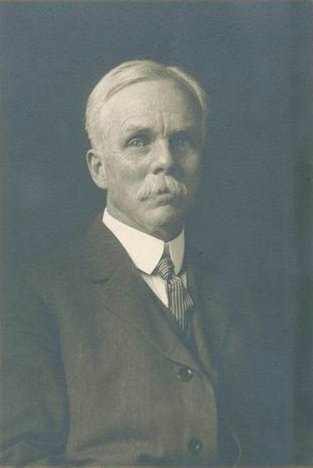

President of the American Library Association
- In office 1896–1897
- Preceded by: John Cotton Dana
- Succeeded by: Justin Winsor

Personal details
- Born: July 1, 1846 Braceville, Ohio, United States
- Died: August 24, 1918 (aged 72) Cleveland, Ohio, United States
- Children: 4, including George and William
- Education: University of Michigan
- Occupation: Librarian

Military service
- Allegiance: United States
- Branch/service: Union Army
- Unit: 196th Ohio Regiment
- Battles/wars: American Civil War

William Howard Brett (July 1, 1846 – August 24, 1918) was head librarian for the Cleveland Public Library from 1884 to 1918. American Libraries described him as one of the "100 most important leaders (librarians) had in the 20th century" His efforts to provide lifelong learning was the basis for the Cleveland Public Library to be recognized as the "People's University."

== Introduction ==
As Cleveland Public Library's head librarian William H. Brett introduced the "open shelf" idea to the library system and increased the collection to over 3 million books and periodicals before his death. Brett lobbied and received funding to build library branches in the city neighborhoods. He believed in professional development and training in librarianship and so spearheaded a program at Western Reserve University (now Case Western Reserve University) and later became dean of the "library school" established in 1903. Brett continued his contributions to the profession as president of the American Library Association, founder and first president of the Ohio Library Association, and passionate writer. One interesting fact is that Brett was a civil war veteran and was instrumental in the installation of "library service to the US soldiers and sailors in America, France, and other locations".

== In the beginning ==
Brett started his career in the field of library science at Warren High School, when, "then only fourteen and the youngest boy in high school, [he] was appointed librarian." As reported in Portrait of a Librarian, a lifelong friend and classmate, William C. Cochran, remembered that "he [Brett] knew every book in the library, its place on the shelves and what it contained between its cover". After his first year of college at the University of Michigan, Brett moved to Cleveland, Ohio, married Alice Allen, started a family, and distinguished himself in the wholesale book distributing business. In 1884, he was appointed the head librarian for the Cleveland Public Library.

William and Alice Brett had five children, four sons and one daughter, including George Brett and William H. Brett Jr..

== The Cleveland Library System ==
The Cleveland Public Library became one of the first "large system libraries" in the country to implement the "open shelf" system. Brett wanted a library where the users had free and open access to the collection and could select their own books without going through a librarian. Brett was also forward thinking when he solicited Andrew Carnegie for funds to build branch libraries around the city. Brett wanted to have libraries dedicated to the public that were located in their neighborhoods and within walking distance of their schools, work, and homes. "By the time of his death in 1918 there were 25 branches ranging from large to small, 17 libraries in high and grade schools, one library in a normal school, 487 classroom libraries, 42 deposit stations, 66 delivery stations, 7 children's stations, one municipal reference library, and one library for the blind. All of this brought the total number of book outposts, quite beyond the main library, to the impressive figure of 648." Brett continued to blaze trails when he seized the opportunity to rearrange the library collection into "divisional arrangements" which separated the reference and circulating books by major categories and dedicated a staff to each subject matter. This plan was considered "uneconomical and impracticable as a permanent working plan". The success of this administrative organization and library layout is evident in our library systems today thanks to Brett and his "vice-librarian", Linda A. Eastman. In order to achieve the goal of creating libraries that patrons would want to use, William Howard Brett set out to increase the library's collection of books and periodicals. By 1915, the Cleveland Library was considered "third among the great libraries of the country" because of its circulation numbers. It was reported in The Open Shelf Memorial Number that Mr. Brett built the library collection from 50,000 books in 1889 to over 3 million books in circulation before his death in 1918.

== "The Greatest Children's Librarian" ==
Known as the "greatest children's librarian", Brett spent his professional tenure championing for the development of dedicated children's room in public libraries, children's libraries in schools, and for librarians to be trained as child and youth professionals. Brett believed that children should have a space of their own with librarians dedicated just to them.

With that in mind, he created in the Cleveland Public Library system what we know today as being the children's area in public libraries. Brett partnered with public schools to establish children's libraries in Cleveland, Ohio. Several of his speeches and reports were published regarding his position on the role and relationship of libraries and public schools. Two such reports are "The relations of the public library to the public schools" and "The School and the Library". Brett continued to foster and encourage the specific training of children's librarianship through the "library school". In 1909, Brett and his assistant, Caroline Burnite, saw the need for trained workers to work in the children's department so they started a training class which later was incorporated into the School of Library Science at Western Reserve University in 1920 "as one of their specialized course".

== Librarianship ==
Linda A. Eastman states in Portrait of a Librarian William Howard Brett that Brett believed librarians should be "trained for efficiency". So with the assistance of professors from Western Reserve University and the Cleveland public library staff Brett created a series of training and development courses. This resulted in the formation of the "library school" program at Western Reserve University which Brett became dean of in 1903. According to Case Western Reserve University the library school changed its name in 1924 to the School of Library Science and in 1981 it was renamed Mathew A. Baxter School of Information & Library Science.

Case Western Reserve University closed the School of Information & Library Science in 1986. The American Library Association (ALA) was honored to have Brett as their president from 1896 to 1897. Brett was a founding member and first president of the Ohio Library Association. He was elected into the Notable Ohio Libraries Hall Of Fame by the Ohio Library Council in 1975.

== War and library service ==
Brett was an Army veteran who served in the 196th Ohio Regiment during the Civil War and worked tirelessly for the American Library Association's Library War Service. Between 1917 and 1920, the ALA supplied "books and magazines to U.S. troops in America and France". Always the librarian and war supporter, Brett started a chapter of the Library War Service in Ohio and proceeded to collect funds and books in service of the war effort. Before his untimely death by a drunk driver, Brett was preparing to deliver a set of books and magazines dedicated to the soldiers fighting in World War I in France. This donation and other U. S. librarians' volunteer service later established what is now known as the American Library in Paris.

== Publications ==
- The relations of the public library to the public schools, 1892
- Freedom in public libraries, 1897
- The School and the Library, 1905
- Abstract of Laws Relating to Libraries, in Force in 1915, in the States and Territories of the United States, 1916; Publisher-Cleveland; Private printing (Lezius printing company)
- Libraries and the Great War, 1919, Cleveland Publisher

== Bibliography ==
- Archives, U. (2005–2009). Schools of CWRU. Retrieved January 2011, from case.edu: www.case.edu/its/archives/Units/schools.htm
- American Library Association. (2010, April 16). Library War Service. Retrieved January 2011, from wikis.ala.org: www.wikis.ala.org/professionaltips/index.php/Library_War_Service
- American Library Association. (2007, November 20). Past Offices & Executive Board. Retrieved January 30, 2011, from American Library Association:www.ala.org/ala/aboutala/governance/officers/past/index.cfm
- "Awards and Honors Recipients" (PDF). Ohio Library Council.
- Books, A. (n.d.). William Howard Brett: Books. Retrieved January 2011, from Amazon.com: www.amazon.com
- Cleveland Public Library in Encyclopedia. (2009). Retrieved January 2011, from tutorgig: www.tutorgig.com/ed/Cleveland_Public_Library
- Eastman, L. A. (1940). Portrait of a Librarian: William Howard Brett. Chicago: American Library Association.
- Leonard Kniffel, P. S. (1999, December). 100 of the Most Important Leaders we had in the 20th Century. American Libraries.
- Pratt, J. M. (Writer), & Martin, D. (Director). (2011). The Lost Valentine [Motion Picture]. unknown. (1918, September–October).
- "William Howard Brett, Librarian of the Cleveland Public Library September 1, 1884 – August 24, 1918". The Open Shelf (9–10 Memorial Number). September–October 1918.

Non-profit organization positions
Preceded by John Cotton Dana	President of the American Library Association; 1896–1897	Succeeded by Justin Winsor
