= Elmendorf =

Elmendorf may refer to:

== People with the surname ==
- Dave Elmendorf, American former NFL player
- Douglas Elmendorf, American economist and former director of the Congressional Budget Office
- Henry Livingston Elmendorf, American librarian
- Lucas Conrad Elmendorf, United States Representative from New York
- Steven Elmendorf, American political advisor and lobbyist
- Theresa Elmendorf, American librarian

== Places ==
- Elmendorf, Texas
- Elmendorf Air Force Base, Anchorage, Alaska
- Elmendorf Farm, Fayette County, Kentucky

== See also ==
- Elmendorf Christian Community, an independent Hutterite Colony in Mountain Lake, Minnesota
- Elmendorf Reformed Church, listed on the National Register of Historic Places in New York City
- Elmendorf Beast
