= Frederic A. Godcharles =

American politician

Pennsylvania House of Representatives
- In office 1901–1902

Pennsylvania Senate
- In office 1905–1908

Director of the State Library of Pennsylvania and State Museum
- In office 1927–1931

Personal details
- Born: June 3, 1872 Northumberland, Pennsylvania
- Died: December 30, 1944 (aged 72) Leonardtown, Maryland
- Party: Republican
- Spouse: Mary Walls Barber

Frederic Antes Godcharles (June 3, 1872 – December 30, 1944) was a Pennsylvania politician, historian and author, who served as soldier and as director of the State Library of Pennsylvania and State Museum of Pennsylvania.

== Personal life ==
Godcharles was born on June 3, 1872, in Northumberland, Pennsylvania, the first of five children of Elizabeth (born Burkenbine) and Charles Aiken Godcharles. His four younger siblings were Mary, Charles, Walter, and Elizabeth (the last three were born in Milton, Pennsylvania). He married Mary Walls Barber (1880–1952) in Washington, D.C., on June 15, 1904. They had no children.

He graduated from Lafayette College with an electrical engineering degree in 1893. Godcharles was an avid trap shooter and placed fourth in a professional-amateur shoot. He and his wife moved to Maryland after his term as Director of the Pennsylvania State Library and Museum, and died in Leonardtown there after a brief illness, aged 72.

== Public service ==
Godcharles was a member of the U.S. Army in the Spanish–American War in 1898. He served in the Army again during the First World War, and rose to the rank of captain.

Godcharles was a member of the Republican Party and served in both houses of the Pennsylvania General Assembly. Godcharles represented Northumberland County in the Pennsylvania House of Representatives in 1901 and 1902, and represented Union County in the Pennsylvania State Senate from 1905 to 1908. Other sources differ as to his service in the General Assembly: his obituary in The New York Times said he served in the "General Assembly in 1900 and the Pennsylvania Senate from 1904 to 1908", while The Political Graveyard says he was a member of the "Pennsylvania state senate, 1905-08" and a member of the Pennsylvania delegation to the 1908 Republican National Convention, and the book Union County, Pennsylvania: A Celebration of History lists him as representing Union County, Pennsylvania, in the state senate from 1909 to 1912.

In 1920 Godcharles was living in Milton, Pennsylvania working as the editor of a weekly newspaper. He was an unsuccessful candidate for the Republican nomination for the office of Secretary of Internal Affairs in 1926, and was mentioned as a probable nominee for the same office in 1930.

=== State librarian and museum director ===
Godcharles served as Pennsylvania State Librarian and Director of the State Museum of Pennsylvania from 1927 to 1931. He had numerous duties outside the state library and museum. For example, in 1928 Godcharles presided at the dedication of a new museum at the birthplace of Henry Clay Frick in Scottdale, Pennsylvania. He served as the official representative for Pennsylvania Governor John S. Fisher and featured speaker at a Flag Day parade and ceremony in New York City in 1929. In 1930 Godcharles was a founding member of the "Society for Pennsylvania Archeology" (SPA) and was elected to its executive board.

The State Museum of Pennsylvania had been founded in 1905, and at the time of his appointment the state librarian was also director of the museum. Godcharles wrote in 1927 that "the Museum was at a standstill. Nothing of importance had been done in this division, nor anything of value added for some years. He sought extra funding and received a budget increase to increase the museum staff to a total of nine, however the state legislature hampered his efforts by requiring over $11,000 of the budget be kept as a reserve fund instead. It also did not appropriate any additional funds to acquire more "specimens and artifacts". Despite these limitations, 1928 was a record-breaking year for school visits at the museum. In 1929 there were over 20,000 total visitors to the museum and the American Association of Museums ranked it as one of the top sixteen in the United States.

Godcharles' tenure coincided with the beginning of the Great Depression and the state library and museum budget were cut repeatedly as a result. These and staff cuts led him to write "We have not 'sold' our enterprise to the Legislature or to others who hold the public purse strings. They do appreciate the educational importance of the work proposed. It is for us to educate them." He resigned in 1931, but remained active in the SPA, serving as its president in 1933. In 1936 he was elected president of the Eastern States Archeological Foundation and announced a Works Progress Administration project to restore a 1643 Swedish settlement on Tinicum Island near Chester on behalf of the Historical Commission of Pennsylvania, a precursor to the Pennsylvania Historical and Museum Commission.

== Author ==
Godcharles was the author of many works on Pennsylvania history and was awarded a D. Litt. His first book was Freemasonry in Northumberland & Snyder Counties, Pennsylvania (1911, two volumes). His next book grew out of series of newspaper columns he wrote on Pennsylvania history, the self-published Daily Stories of Pennsylvania: Prepared for Publication in the Leading Daily Newspapers of the State (1924). The New York Times review noted it had "a story for each day of the year", many of them originally "widely published in Pennsylvania newspapers on the anniversary of the event or person concerned", and that "Mr. Godcharles succeeds admirably in choosing and bringing out essential facts and relating it all in a readable style."

In 1933 his five-volume Pennsylvania: Political, Governmental, Military and Civil was published, with volumes on Government (I), Political (II), Military (III), Physical (IV), and Biographical (V) history. In 1944 the four-volume Chronicles of Central Pennsylvania was published. He was an editor of an index to the thirty-two volume Encyclopedia of Pennsylvania Biography.
