= Buffalo & Erie County Public Library =

Library in western New York, US

- 42.885503°N 78.87262°W
- Location: 1 Lafayette Square; Buffalo, New York 14203, United States
- Established: 1835
- Branches: 37

Other information
- Website: www.buffalolib.org

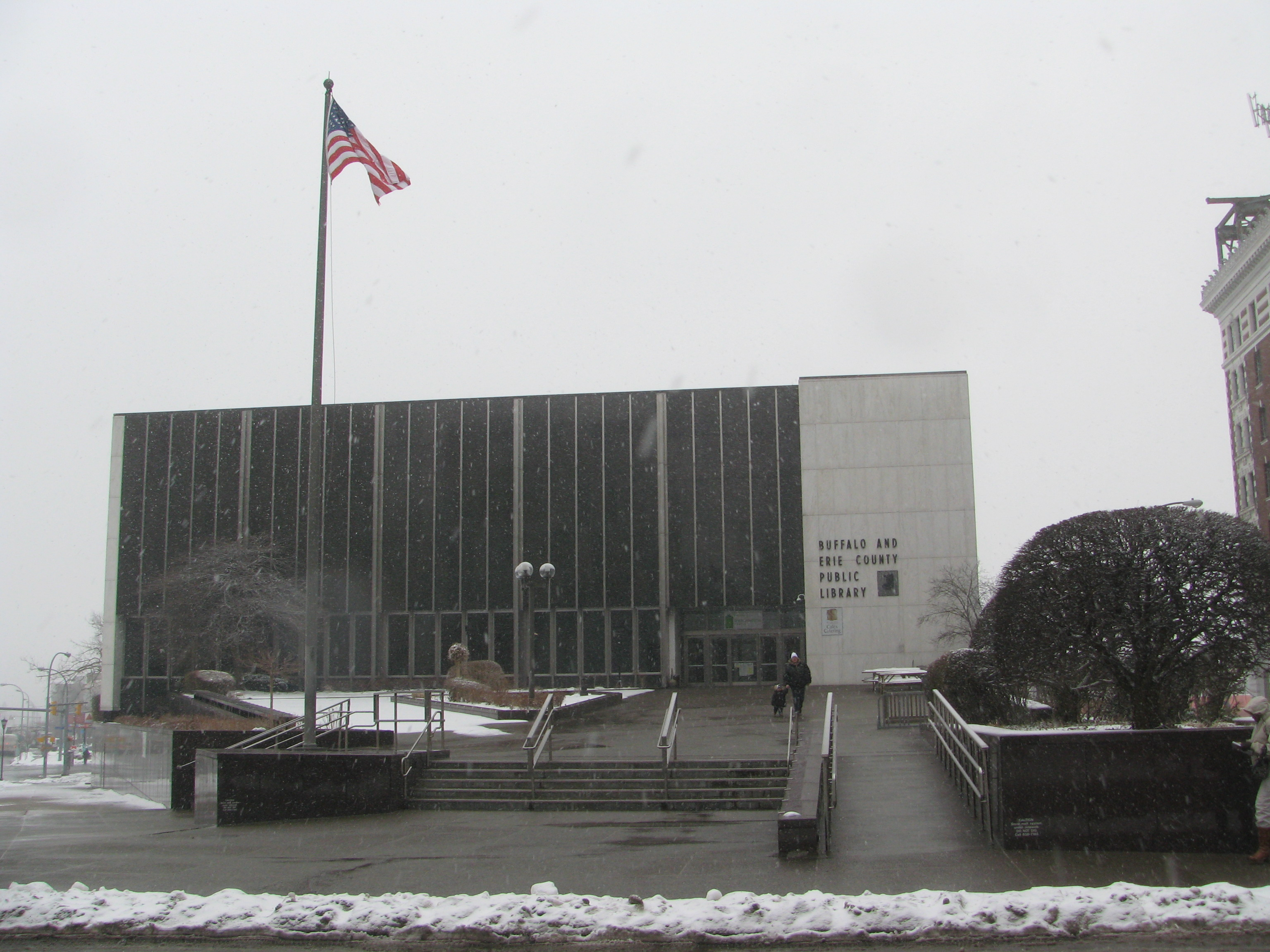
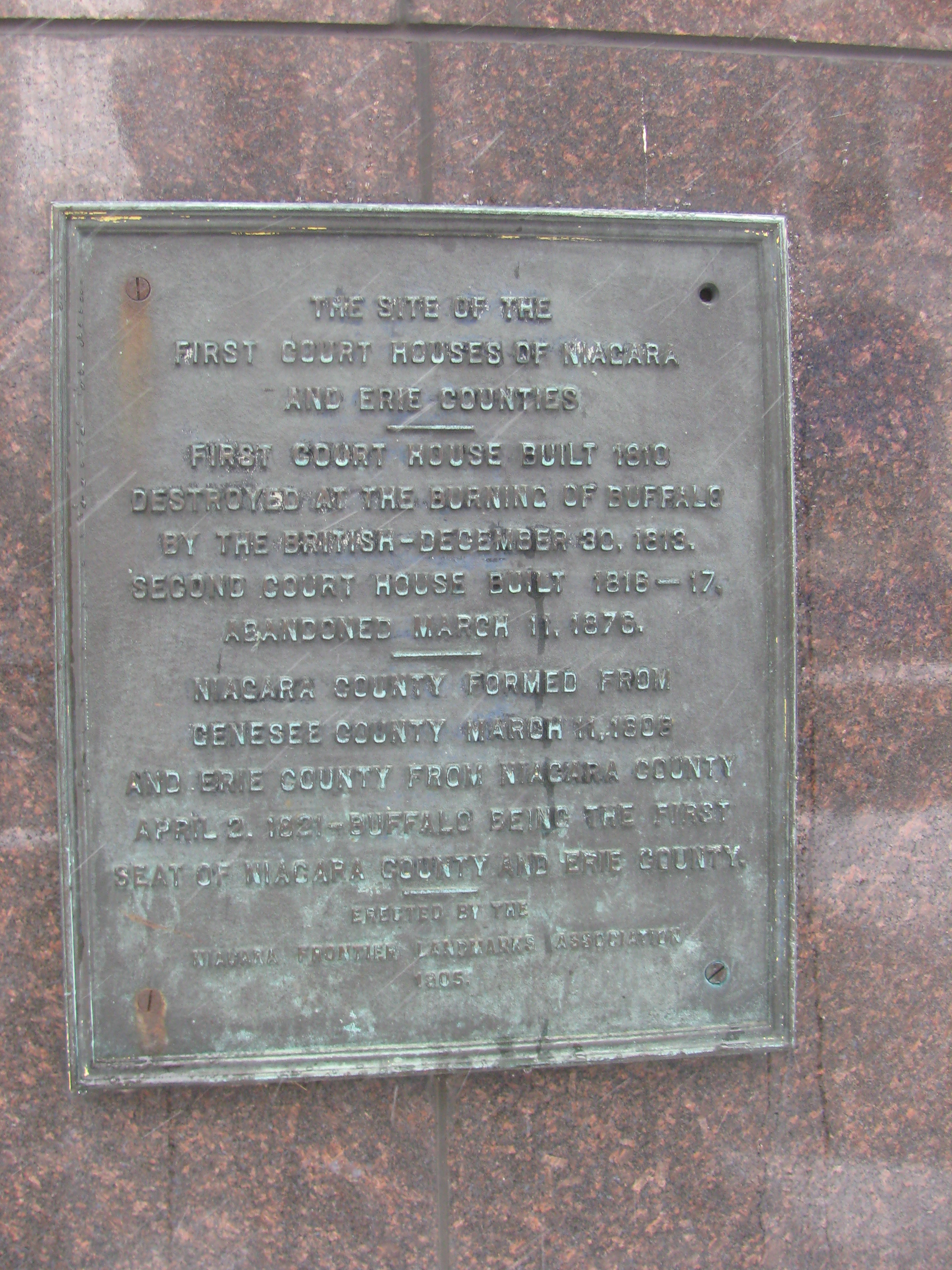
The current building and a plaque commemorating the original Erie County courthouse built on the same parcel

The Buffalo & Erie County Public Library is located on Lafayette Square, Buffalo, New York, United States. The current facility, designed by James William Kideney & Associates and built in 1964, replaced the original Cyrus Eidlitz Buffalo Public Library Building dedicated in February 1887. The first Buffalo Public Library, in turn, replaced the Erie County, New York courthouse, which occupied the parcel from 1816 to 1876.

Founded ca. 1835 as the Young Men's Association (not to be confused with YMCA), prominent members included Mark Twain, who was the editor of the Buffalo Express from 1869 to 1871. The Young Men's Association was a private subscription library, meaning that paid membership was required in order to borrow books. In 1883, the Association began a fund-raising campaign for a new building and held an architectural competition, which culminated in Eidlitz's 1887 design. Upon completion, the Association turned over its collections to the citizens of Buffalo and the Buffalo Public Library was born, with no requirement for dues or membership.

Director from 1897 to 1906 was Henry Livingston Elmendorf, former secretary of the American Library Association (ALA) and husband of Theresa Elmendorf, who went on to serve as the ALA's first woman president. Director from 1906 to 1931 was Walter Lewis Brown, president of the American Library Association from 1916 to 1917.

Significant library collections include the original, hand-written manuscript of Twain's Adventures of Huckleberry Finn, which Twain donated to the library in 1885; and the Milestones of Science, a collection of first editions announcing major advancements in Western science.

== Institutional services ==
The Institutional Services Division provides library services in three Erie County institutions.

Home Branch Library: Begun in 1956 with only a handful of books, it now features typical branch services as well as use the program room for coffee hour, old-time radio programs, large print, video and audio cassettes, read-alouds and travel club programs. Magnifying bars, book supports, tape-players, slides, slideviewers and electronic magnifiers are available for those needing special accommodations. For those unable to visit, room-to-room cart service to residents is provided.

Correctional Facility Library: This library located within the Erie County Correctional Facility contains both a law library and a general public library. Constructed in 1986, this 7,500-square-foot (700 m^{2}) library was the first to be built as a core or focal point of a Correctional Facility. Its general collection contains over 8,000 books for inmates' educational and recreational purposes, and 1,000 square feet (93 m^{2}) of the library is set aside to house a legal collection of over 4,000 volumes. Computers are available to inmates for their legal work.

Holding Center Library: Begun in 1969 as cart service to cells, this library has grown to encompass a new facility with both a legal collection and a general library. Residents can borrow all types of materials from adventure fiction to religious non-fiction and use a large legal collection while awaiting trial.

== Special collections ==
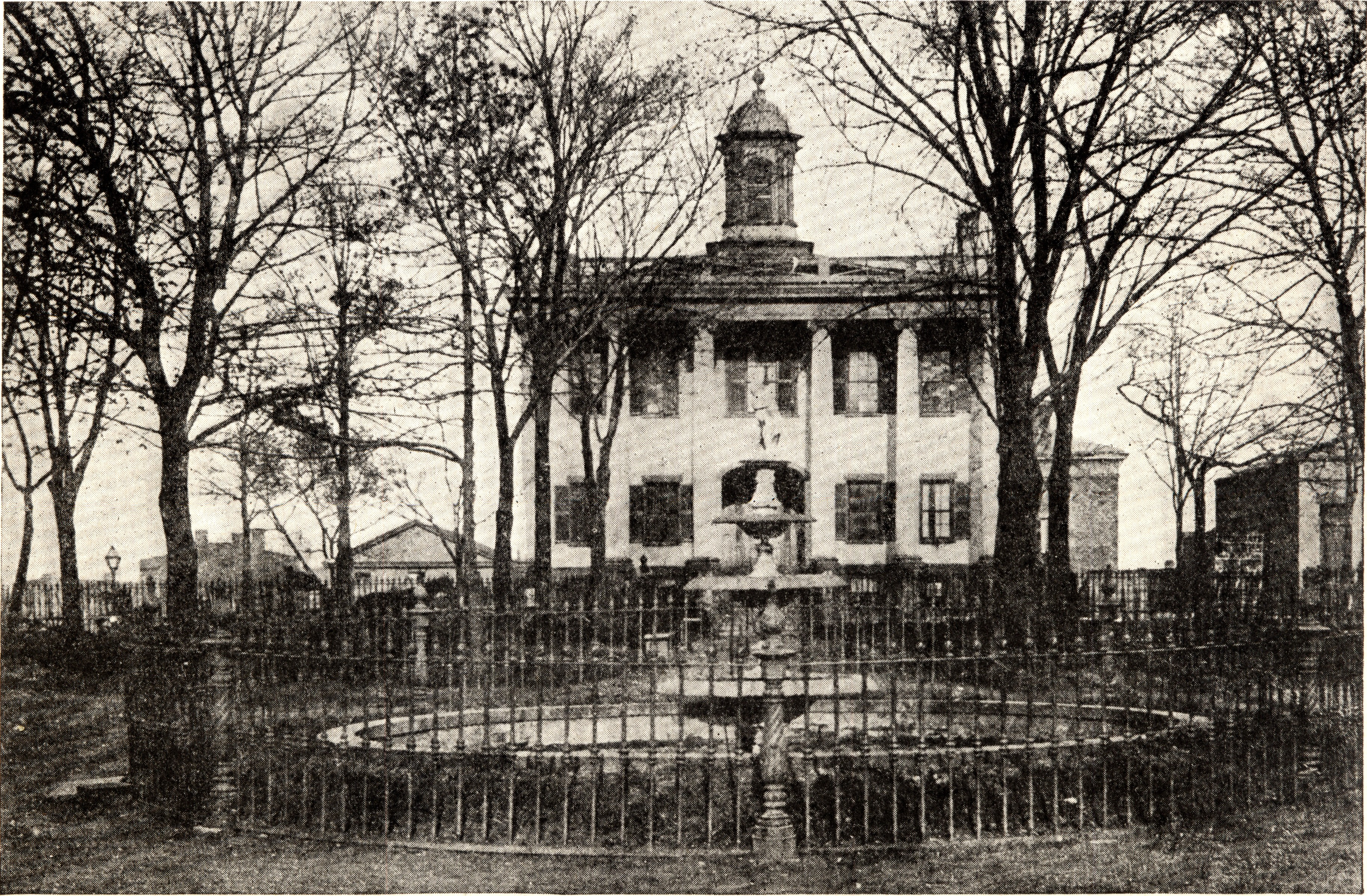
Original Erie County Court House viewed from Court-House Park (now Lafayette Square), 1860s

The Center for Afro-American History and Research: The Center for Afro-American History and Research is the largest resource center in Western New York for information on African-American history and is located at Frank E. Merriweather Jr. Library. The reference collection includes books, microfilm and pictures with its emphasis on primary source material related to African-American history in Western New York. The "Buffalo Afro-American Collection" is a microfilmed collection, which contains the records of many local organizations as well as the personal papers of community leaders. Records include Urban League, BUILD papers, Bethel A.M.E. Church, First Shiloh, Raphael DuBard's papers and more.

Collection for Persons with Disabilities: For individuals with visual impairments, Niagara Frontier Radio reading service receivers, talking books, print-braille books for children, DVDs with descriptive narration and large print books are available. A Stand Alone Reading Appliance (SARA)reader, PC workstation with ZoomText Reader 10 software, NVDA screenreader software and table top magnifier are available for public use. For individuals with hearing impairment, a Sorenson Videophone SVR is available for use by ASL communicators. Assisive listening devices are available for use in the Damon O. Mason Auditorium and at the Ring of Knowledge located on the first floor.

Grosvenor Room: Genealogy, Music, Rare Books: [Pronounced GROVE-ner] This department of Central Library, opened in 1994 as the Special Collections Department, brings together the library's extensive genealogy and local history materials. The Grosvenor Room includes family histories; general and ethnic genealogical research manuals; vital records indexes; passenger lists indexes; church and cemetery records; surname dictionaries; local histories; military rosters; heraldry and family crest dictionaries; and directories of all kinds. In 1995, the department became the home of the collection of the Western New York Genealogical Society, the region's oldest and largest genealogy organization. Materials from most Grosvenor Room collections are for in-library use only and cannot be borrowed.

Mark Twain Room: This special exhibition room at the Central Library is the home of Twain's original handwritten manuscript, Adventures of Huckleberry Finn. Twain was a briefly a member of the Buffalo and Erie County Public Library's predecessor, the Young Men's Association, and donated the manuscript of what is considered by many to be the greatest American novel. In 1885, Twain sent the second half of Huckleberry Finn, believing the first half had been lost by a printer. In 1991, the missing portion of the manuscript turned up in a small steamer trunk in a Los Angeles attic. It was among the possessions of descendants of James Fraser Gluck, a curator of the Buffalo Library who had requested the manuscript from Twain a century earlier. Eventually, Twain mailed the missing half of the manuscript to Gluck, but Gluck, who apparently took it to have it bound, died with it among his belongings in 1897. After gaining possession, the B&ECPL united the manuscript in 1992 for the first time in over a century. This priceless literary masterpiece is showcased in the heart of the Twain room.

The Mark Twain Room also houses an antique walnut mantel from the now-demolished Delaware Avenue home where Mark Twain lived during his short newspaper career in Buffalo. A framed oil portrait of Twain hangs prominently above this scrupulously restored hardwood mantel. Norman Rockwell prints from a 1940 edition of Huckleberry Finn enhance the walls on either side. Two bookcases feature hundreds of Twain publications, including many first editions and many in foreign languages. The Mark Twain Room is open during normal Central Library hours of operation.

== May 14 Community Collecting Initiative ==
The Buffalo & Erie County Public Library is collecting, documenting and preserving an intentional and authentic record of the 2022 Buffalo shooting. This collection work will include, but is not limited to, oral history recordings and the preservation of mementos that will create a repository of collective memory.

A Coalition of professionals, survivors, and the community working to document the tragedy includes Buffalo & Erie County Public Library, The Buffalo History Museum, Buffalo State University, Burchfield Penney Art Center, Canisius University, Darwin D. Martin House, Michigan Street African American Heritage Corridor, The Patricia H. and Richard E. Garman Art Conservation Department, Uncrowned Queens Institute for Research and Education on Women, victims' family members, survivors, and broader community members.

== Area branch libraries ==
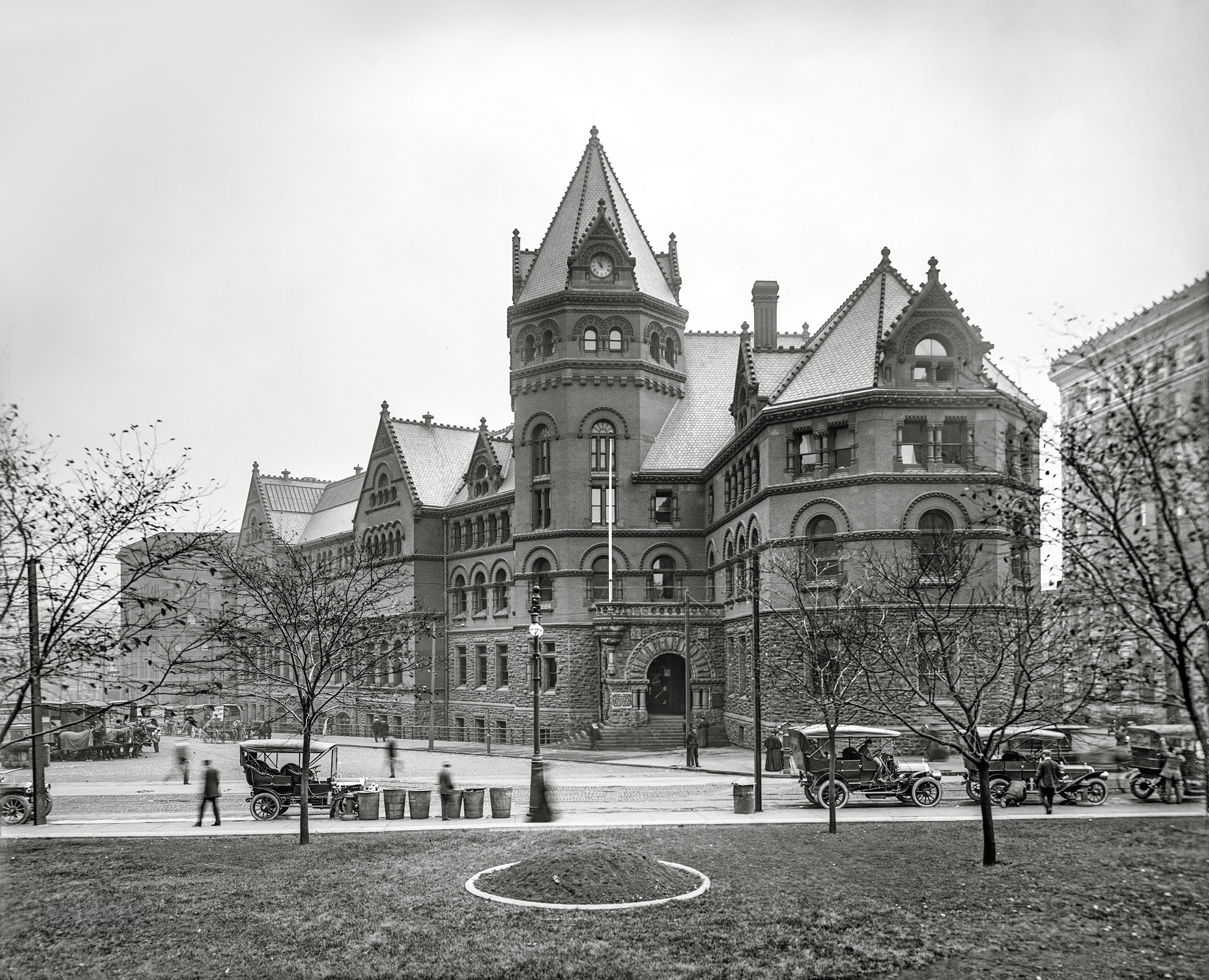
Buffalo Library, designed by Cyrus L. W. Eidlitz and opened in 1887

- Alden (Ewell) Free Library – Alden
- Angola Public Library – Angola
- Amherst Main Library at Audubon – Amherst
- Aurora Town Public Library – East Aurora
- Boston Free Library – Boston
- Central Library – Buffalo
- Clarence Public Library – Clarence
- Amherst Public Library, Clearfield Branch – Williamsville
- Collins Public Library – Collins
- Concord Public Library – Springville
- Crane Branch Library – Buffalo
- Dudley Branch Library – Buffalo
- East Clinton Branch Library – Buffalo
- Leroy R. Coles Jr. Branch Library – Buffalo
- Eden Library – Eden
- Amherst Public Library, Eggertsville-Snyder Branch – Snyder
- Elaine M. Panty Branch Library – Buffalo
- Elma Public Library – Elma
- Grand Island Memorial Library – Grand Island
- Hamburg Public Library, Hamburg Branch – Hamburg
- Isaías González-Soto Branch Library – Buffalo
- Town of Tonawanda Public Library, Kenilworth Branch – Buffalo
- Town of Tonawanda Public Library, Kenmore Branch – Kenmore
- Lackawanna Public Library – Lackawanna
- Hamburg Public Library, Lake Shore Branch – Hamburg
- Lancaster Public Library – Lancaster
- Marilla Free Library – Marilla
- Frank E. Merriweather Jr. Library – Buffalo
- Newstead Public Library – Akron
- North Collins Library – North Collins
- North Park Branch Library – Buffalo
- Orchard Park Public Library – Orchard Park
- Cheektowaga Public Library, Anna M. Reinstein Memorial Branch – Cheektowaga
- Cheektowaga Public Library, Julia Boyer Reinstein Branch – Cheektowaga
- City of Tonawanda Public Library – City of Tonawanda
- West Seneca Public Library – West Seneca
- Amherst Public Library, Williamsville Branch – Williamsville
