= HVF =

HVF may refer to:

- HVF, station code for Haverfordwest railway station, in Wales
- Heavy Vehicles Factory, an Indian defence company
- Les Herbiers VF, a French football club
- Hillary Victory Fund, a US fundraiser
