= Hillary Victory Fund =

American fundraising committee for Hillary Clinton

The Hillary Victory Fund solicited donations online using a web form.

The Hillary Victory Fund was a joint fundraising committee for Hillary for America (the Hillary Clinton presidential campaign organization), the Democratic National Committee (DNC), and 33 state Democratic committees. As of May 2016, the Fund had raised $61 million in donations.

The Fund's promotional materials described it as a way to "support Hillary Clinton and Democrats up and down the ticket". Individual donations were first allocated to Hillary for America (up to $2,700 or $5,400 for married couples), then to the Democratic National Committee (up to $33,400) and finally divided among state parties. During the primaries, the state parties received little of the funds raised. The Bernie Sanders campaign criticized the Fund and alleged that Clinton's campaign was "looting funds meant for the state parties to skirt fundraising limits on her presidential campaign".

== History ==
The Clinton campaign courted state party leaders to join the Fund during the August 2015 Democratic National Committee summer meeting. The fund's launch was originally delayed by concerns from the Clinton campaign over the party's control of shared monies, but went forward on September 10, 2015, as a partnership between the Clinton campaign and the United States Democratic Party's Democratic National Committee. The fund was the earliest fundraising coalition formed between a presidential candidate and the national party. Several officials in the national committee only became aware of the plans in the weeks before its launch. The 33 state parties were added six days later. Mississippi, New Hampshire, Virginia, and Wisconsin were among the first state Democratic Party committees to commit to the Victory Fund. The states, in turn, would receive monies from the fund and assistance with voter registration. Some states, like California, Iowa, Nebraska, and Washington, chose not to participate. The Utah Democratic Party chose to participate and its head said that state donations were expected to be sent to national headquarters. Access to the fund was "legally available to any Democratic candidate", though only Clinton's campaign received direct access to large donors. A spokesperson for the Democratic National Committee said that the joint fundraising committee was designed to raise funds for use after the presidential primary, and was no different from the victory funds of the previous two presidential elections. Proceeds would be invested in the national electoral roll, state party budgets, and expanded research, digital, and communications systems.

The fund raised about $27 million in 2015 and received "six-figure donations from longtime Clinton allies". Hillary Clinton attended her first Hillary Victory Fund event in early December 2015 with 160 attendees. The musician Sting hosted the event in New York. Tickets ranged from $33,400 per person to $100,000 per couple, and raised $8 million for the fund. The fund held a second event, hosted by Elton John and Katy Perry in Radio City Music Hall, in early March 2016. George and Amal Clooney hosted a third fundraiser on April 15, 2016, in the Bay Area home of venture capitalist Shervin Pishevar for the Hillary Victory Fund in which seats at the head table with the Clooneys and Clinton cost $350,000. A fundraiser the next day at the Clooneys' mansion had an entrance fee of $33,400 per person. (For comparison, other Clinton fundraisers without celebrities asked hosts to raise $10,000 to $50,000.) Attendees at the Clooney mansion event included Kate Capshaw and Steve Spielberg, Jeffrey Katzenberg, and Haim and Cheryl Saban. Following the national committee's decision to end its 2008 ban on federal lobbyist contributions, the International Business Times reported another event on March 21, 2016, organized by Clinton campaign chair John Podesta, Citibank and News Corporation lobbyist Steve Elmendorf, pharmaceutical lobbyist Jeff Forbes, and financial lobbyist Susan Brophy for the Hillary Victory Fund. A single donor could give upwards of $700,000 to the fund.

== Finances ==
The fund was managed by the Clinton campaign and its treasurer was the campaign's chief operating officer, Elizabeth Jones, who had the sole discretion for the timing of money transfers. The Washington Post wrote that the fund operated within the Clinton campaign and was run by campaign staff, who were, in turn, funded by the Hillary Victory Fund. Money raised by the Fund was deposited with Amalgamated Bank, a union-owned bank that also hosted accounts of Hillary for America and the Democratic National Committee. The campaign said that the state parties and other party campaigns would benefit from the agreement in a time when Republicans received donations in "record amounts". The campaign saw itself as competing with "untold hundreds of millions of dollars being spent with zero accountability by super PACs".

The Hillary Victory Fund let the Clinton 2016 presidential campaign ask big donors for over $350,000 apiece per calendar year, or $700,000 from married couples. American presidential campaigns have a history of working to reach the legal maximum donations from single donors. In 2008, Barack Obama's presidential campaign sought $30,000 in donations from big donors, which was the legal limit for donations to the campaign and related fundraising committees. In 2014, the Supreme Court case McCutcheon v. FEC built on the Citizens United decision by ruling that limitations to an individual's total political donations were unconstitutional. These unregulated contributions to political party committees is known as "soft money", and had led to corruption cases in both parties from malfeasance in the 1980s and 90s before Congress barred its use in 2002. The 2014 Congressional omnibus budget bill also raised political party donation limits.

In 2016, single donors to the Hillary Victory Fund could contribute $2,700 to the Clinton campaign, $33,400 to the Democratic National Committee, and $10,000 to each of the 33 state Democratic Party committees, for a total of nearly $360,000 in a calendar year. (Note: The maximum annual donation is $356,100.) Joint finance committees like Hillary Victory Fund could receive that amount in a single check and proportion the funds accordingly. A donor who maxed out their contributions in 2015 could also max out in 2016 for a total of $700,000 towards the 2016 election, which is 135 times the $5,400 personal limit for presidential campaign contributions. (By comparison, in prior election cycles, individual donors were limited to $123,200 in total contributions.)

The fund raised about $27 million in 2015. Individual donors who contributed over $300,000 in 2015 included Susie Tompkins Buell, Fred Eychaner, J. B. Pritzker, Laure Woods, Avie Glazer, Jeffrey Katzenberg, Philip Munger, and Alice Walton. In September 2015, the Hillary Victory Fund spent $800,000 on fundraising and Clinton campaign staff salaries, gave $600,000 to the Democratic National Committee, and left $1.75 million to be distributed. More than $4 million of the fund went to direct mail and online fundraising for small contributions. Much of this material resembled Clinton campaign materials and used the campaign slogan. The Hillary Victory Fund spent $6.4 million on operations in 2015, of which two-thirds went to Clinton campaign-affiliated vendors in Washington, D.C. By the end of 2015, $3.24 million went to Clinton's campaign and $4.13 million went to the national committee. Of the latter, the state parties were due to receive $1.8 million, but the funds were redirected to the national committee to pay off outstanding debt. Clinton staff salaries and overhead were paid $1.5 million out of the fund in 2015. The fund also ran Clinton's online merchandise store. Purchases at the store did not count towards contribution maximums.

== Reception ==
Paul Blumenthal, a political reporter for The Huffington Post noted that the super joint fundraising committee was unusual. Candidates did not normally agree to joint fundraising until after securing the nomination. It was also the first fundraising committee since the 2014 fundraising law changes. The New York Times reported that some state party officials "expressed reservations" at the Clinton campaign's pairing with the national party before the nominee was officially selected. By comparison, the 2008 campaign's fund was not started until June of the election year, and as of February 2016, the Republican National Committee had not established a joint fundraising committee with its candidates. Some states were hesitant to join the fund, which might have appeared as a Clinton endorsement and alienated local donors, but national party officials described the fund as "a way to strengthen the party at its roots". Clinton's opponents in the Democratic presidential primary complained of lack of impartiality on the part of the national committee. While some Democrats questioned the strategy of joint fundraising, when Republican super PACs were outpacing Clinton's campaign in fundraising, the chairman of the New Hampshire state party said that it was never too early to prepare for the general election.

The Washington Post reported in February 2016 that the Clinton campaign had received much of the fund's benefits despite its intended use in state party elections. The newspaper added that the early organization of the fund was a demonstration of the campaign's maximization of big donor support. As the Clinton campaign fought off fellow primary candidate Bernie Sanders, the fund recruited new, small donors—a strategy that campaign finance attorneys described to The Washington Post as "unusual," since joint fundraising committees normally focused on large donors and posh events. A former general counsel of the Federal Election Commission said that the joint fundraising committee structure was never intended to support a single candidate, and the fund appeared to turn "the traditional notion of a joint committee into a Hillary fundraising committee". As of February 2016, the Sanders campaign was not involved in active joint fundraising with the National Democratic Committee and considered the fund to be subsidiary to the Clinton campaign. The Sanders joint fundraising committee, the Bernie Victory Fund, was headed by the national committee's chief financial officer, and its only funding was a $1,000 donation from the national committee. As of March 2016, the Sanders campaign financed itself completely through small donations and was potentially uninterested in the Victory Fund coffers if nominated.

In May 2016, Politico analyzed Federal Election Commission filings and found that the state parties retained less than one percent of the $61 million raised by the Hillary Victory Fund. While $3.8 million had been transferred to the state parties, 88 percent of it was transferred back to the national committee, usually within 1–2 days, by the Clinton staff member who led the Fund. This let the national committee intake money from individuals beyond the limit they could receive from individuals directly. The campaign received $15.4 million of the Fund and the national committee received $5.7 million. Most of the $23.3 million expended directly by the Hillary Victory Fund has gone to activities that directly benefit the Clinton campaign, such as $2.8 million for staffing costs and $8.6 million in web advertising. These ads were run by the same company used by the Clinton campaign. Politico reported state party officials as being unhappy about the "one-sided" arrangement in which the states parties were used to raise money for the Clinton campaign while its supporters exaggerated the good done for the state parties. The Clinton campaign and national committee said that all state branches of the party would benefit from the improved national voter data.

According to Donna Brazile's book "Hacks: The Inside Story," the Joint Fund-Raising Agreement between the DNC, Hillary Victory Fund, and Hillary for America was the reason that the DNC chair "couldn't write a press release without passing it by" Clinton's campaign staff. This Agreement was signed in August 2015, which was before Brazil became DNC interim chair. Under the Agreement, Clinton would control the DNC's finances, strategy, and all money raised. Also, the DNC would consult with the Campaign about all other staffing, budgeting, data, analytics, and mailings.

== Complaint by anti-Clinton PAC ==
In December 2017, the Committee to Defend the President, a hybrid PAC formally known as the Stop Hillary PAC, filed a complaint with the Federal Election Commission (FEC), accusing Clinton's 2016 campaign and the Democratic Party of "an unprecedented, massive, nationwide multi-million dollar conspiracy." The complaint alleged an $84 million money laundering scheme between the Clinton campaign, Democratic National Committee, Democratic state parties, and Democratic mega-donors in violation of multiple campaign finance laws. In a response to the complaint, the DNC called the allegations a "political stunt", and pointed out that the Trump campaign had raised over $100 million from 20 Republican state parties.

In June 2018, the FEC filed a motion to dismiss the complaint, stating that the Committee "lacks Article III standing because it has failed to allege a concrete and particularized injury."
