= Hiller Crowell Wellman =

American librarian (1871–1956)

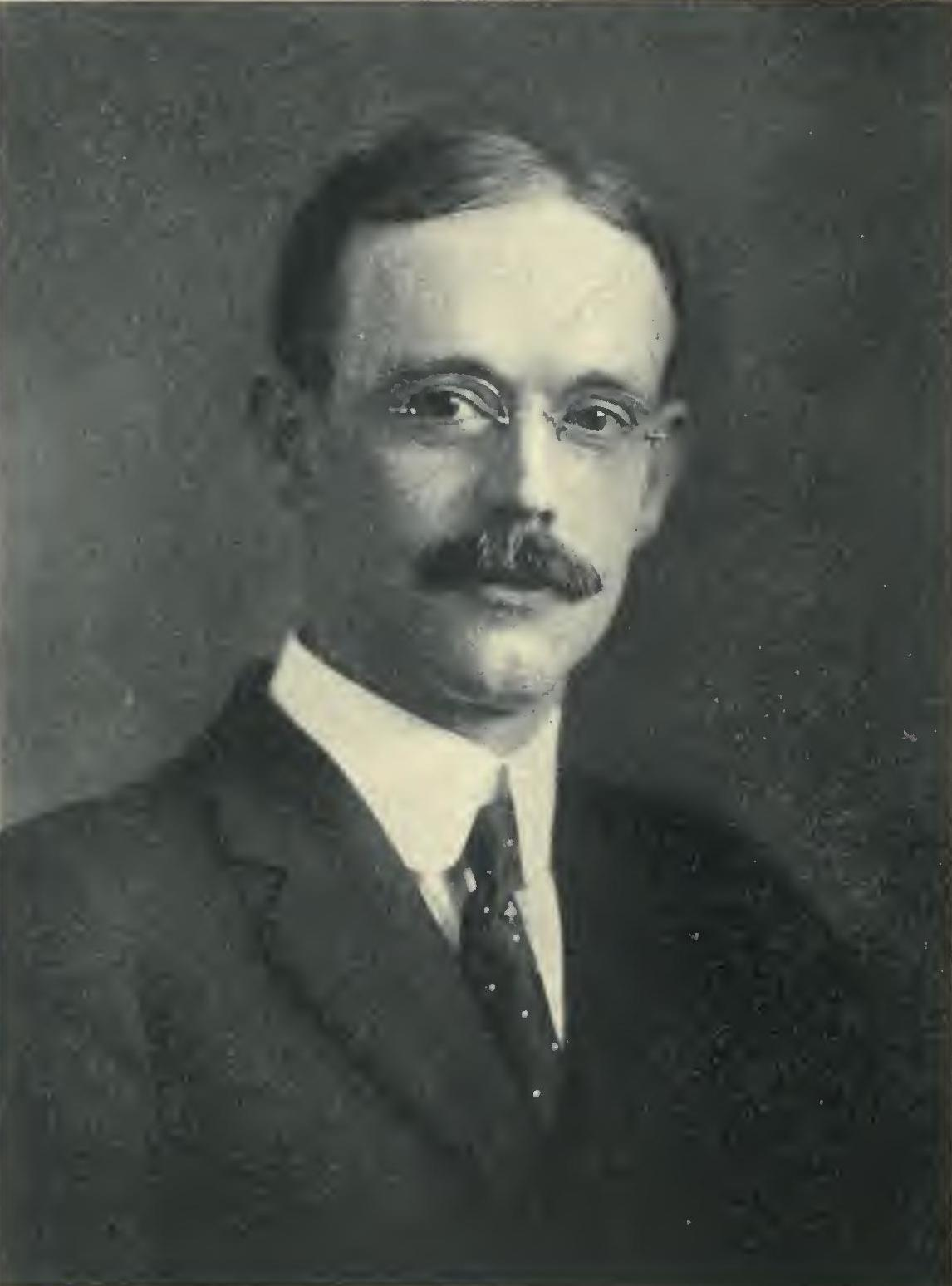
- Wellman in 1914

President of the American Library Association
- In office 1914–1915
- Preceded by: Edwin Hatfield Anderson
- Succeeded by: Mary Wright Plummer

Personal details
- Born: March 22, 1871 Boston, Massachusetts, US
- Died: February 3, 1956 (aged 84) Springfield, Massachusetts, US
- Occupation: Librarian

Hiller Crowell Wellman (March 22, 1871 in Boston – February 3, 1956) was an American librarian who served as president of the American Library Association (1914–15). He was librarian for the Springfield (Massachusetts) City Library from 1902 to 1948. Before his tenure in Springfield, Wellman served as librarian at the Brookline Library. In addition, Wellman was special editor for library terms for Webster's New International Dictionary, Second Edition.

== Bibliography ==
- "An Article of Faith" Address delivered before the graduating class of the library school, the New York Public Library, June 6, 1919
- "What the City Library is doing to help win the war" Bulletin of the American Library Association, Volume 12. (1918) p. 57-60
- "President's Address: The Library's Primary Duty" Bulletin of the American Library Association, Volume 9. (1915) p. 89-93

Non-profit organization positions
Preceded by Edwin Hatfield Anderson	President of the American Library Association; 1914–1915	Succeeded by Mary Wright Plummer
