= Henry Eduard Legler =

American politician

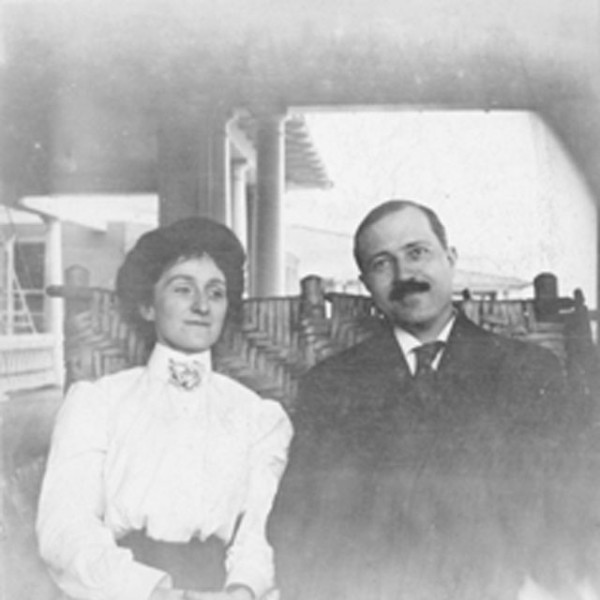
- Henry Legler with Sarah Byrd Eskew

President of the American Library Association
- In office 1912–1913
- Preceded by: Theresa West Elmendorf
- Succeeded by: Edwin Hatfield Anderson

Personal details
- Born: June 22, 1861 Palermo, Sicily, Italy
- Died: September 13, 1917 (aged 56) Chicago, Illinois, US
- Party: Republican
- Occupation: Librarian; journalist; politician

Henry Eduard Legler (June 22, 1861 – September 13, 1917) was an Italian American journalist, politician, and librarian. Born in Palermo, Sicily, Italy, His birth name was given as Enrico, Legler emigrated with his parents to the United States in 1869 and then settled in Milwaukee, Wisconsin in 1872. While in Wisconsin, Legler was a journalist. In 1889, Legler served in the Wisconsin State Assembly and was a Republican. From 1890 to 1894, Legler served as secretary of the Milwaukee School Board.

From 1904 to 1909, Legler served as secretary of the Wisconsin Library Commission. Then, from 1909 until his death in 1917, Legler served as librarian of the Chicago Public Library. Legler also served as president of the American Library Association in 1912 and 1913. Legler also served as curator of the Wisconsin Historical Society and had written several books and articles about history. Legler died in Chicago, Illinois.

== Bibliography ==
- Library Ideals (Open Court Publishing, 1918)
- Of much love and some knowledge of books (Caxton Club, 1912)
- Books for the People (1908)
- Leading Events of Wisconsin History: The Story of the State (Sentinel Company, 1898)

Non-profit organization positions
| Preceded by Theresa West Elmendorf | President of the American Library Association; 1912–1913 | Succeeded by Edwin Hatfield Anderson |
