= Thomas Lynch Montgomery =

American librarian

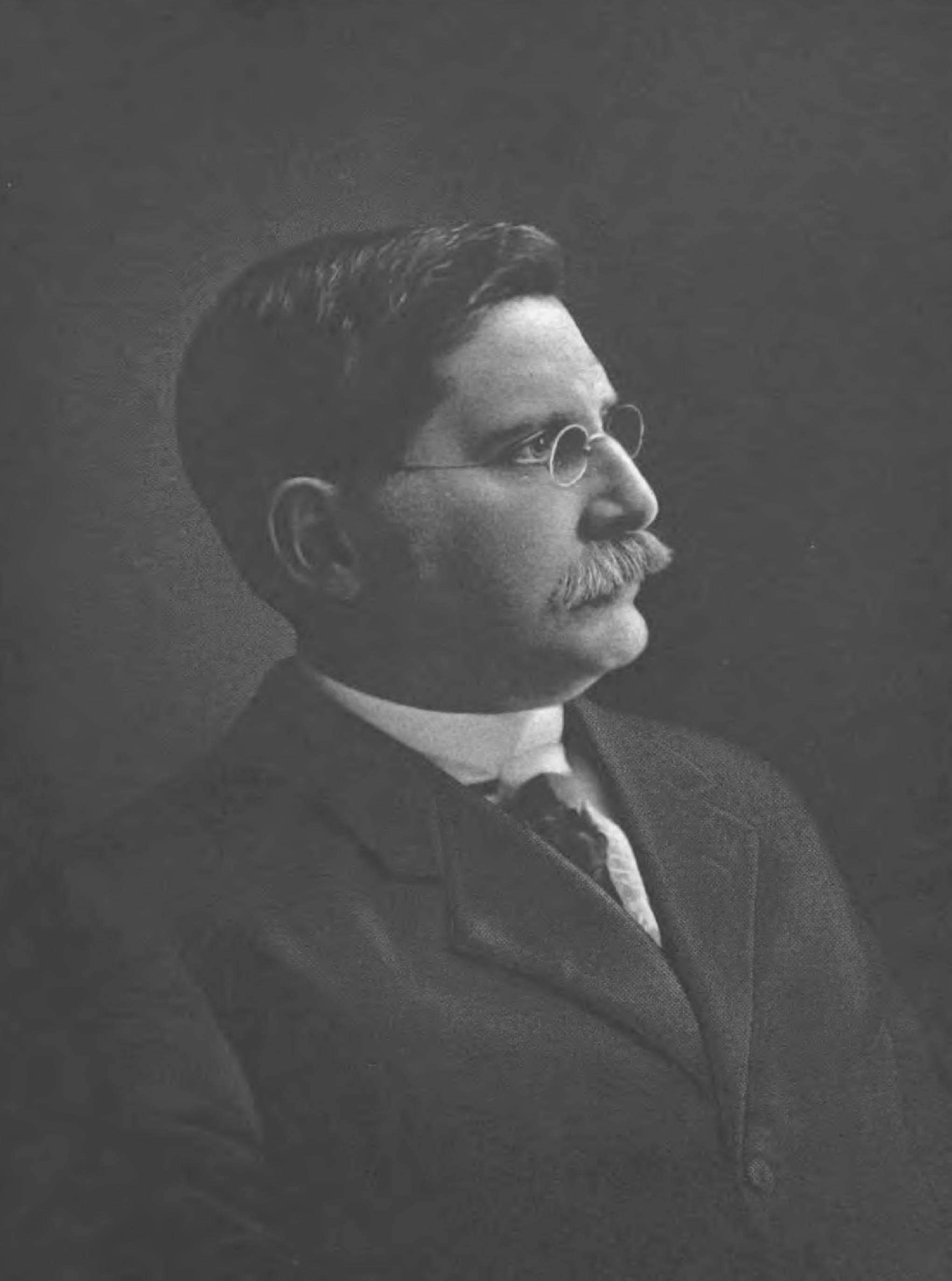

President of the American Library Association
- In office 1917–1918
- Preceded by: Walter Lewis Brown
- Succeeded by: William Warner Bishop

Personal details
- Born: March 4, 1862 Philadelphia, Pennsylvania, US
- Died: October 1, 1929 (aged 67)
- Spouses: Brinca Gilpin (m. 1889); Susan Keim Savage
- Education: University of Pennsylvania
- Occupation: Librarian; historian
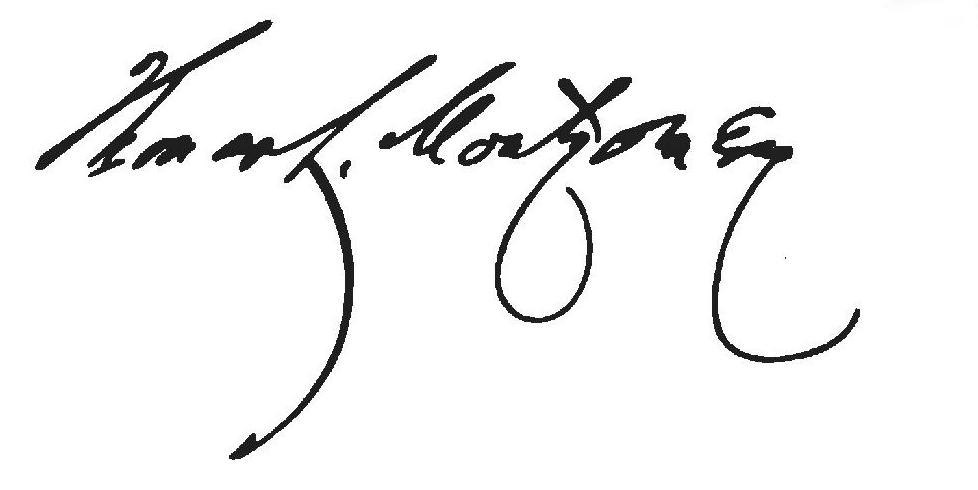
- Signature

Thomas Lynch Montgomery (March 4, 1862 – October 1, 1929) was an American historian and librarian of the Pennsylvania State Library, Harrisburg.

Thomas Lynch Montgomery was born in the Germantown area of Philadelphia, Pennsylvania, March 4, 1862, the son of Oswald Crathorne and Catherine Gertrude (Lynch) Montgomery. He graduated from the University of Pennsylvania in 1884, with the degree of Bachelor of Arts.

His entire life's career was devoted to library work and the preservation of historical and antiquarian memorabilia and records. In 1886, he became actuary and librarian of the Wagner Free Institute of Science. He was founder of the Pennsylvania Library Club in 1890. In 1892 he established the first branch of the Philadelphia Free Library, and in 1894 became one of its trustees and chairman of the library committee. In February 1903, he was appointed to the position of State Librarian.

He was secretary of Pennsylvania Free Library Commission; commissioner for the Preservation of Historical Archives of Pennsylvania; editor of Pennsylvania Archives; a charter member of the Keystone Library Association; member of the Philadelphia Academy of Natural Sciences, the American Historical Association, the American Philosophical Society, and the Philobiblion Club; life member of the Historical Society of Pennsylvania; American Library Association and Spring Garden Institute; honorary member of the Dauphin County Historical Society; Wyoming Historical and Geological Society; member of council of Swedish Colonial Society; and of the Harrisburg Club, Harrisburg; and University Club, Philadelphia.

He was a Republican.

Montgomery married Brinca Gilpin of Philadelphia on October 16, 1889. Several years after her death, he married Susan Keim Savage. Montgomery died on October 1, 1929, at the age of 67.

Non-profit organization positions
Preceded by Walter Lewis Brown	President of the American Library Association; 1917–1918	Succeeded by William Warner Bishop
