= Edwin H. Anderson =

American librarian

Edwin Hatfield Anderson
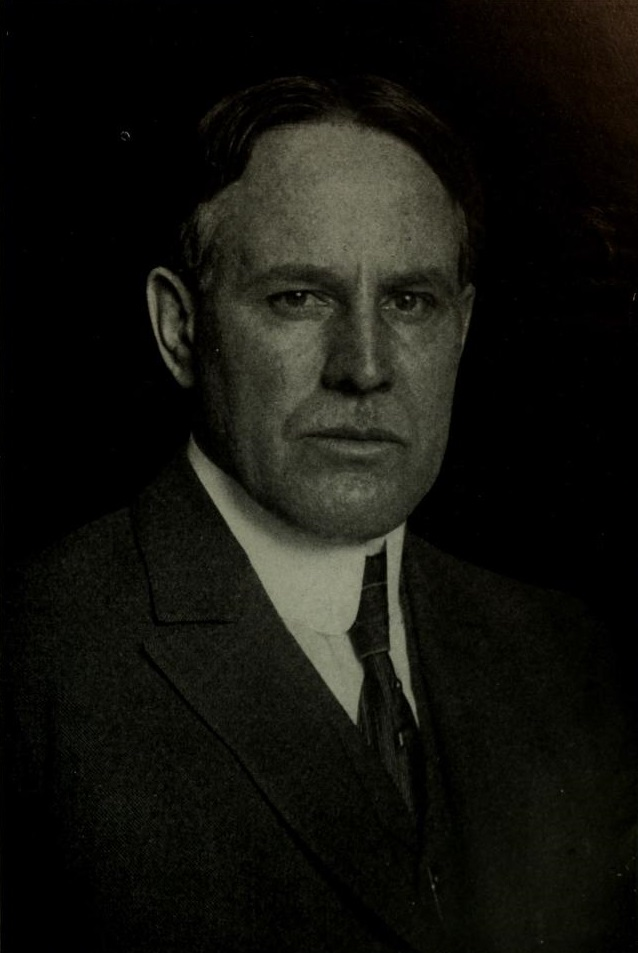

President of the American Library Association
- In office 1913–1914
- Preceded by: Henry Eduard Legler
- Succeeded by: Hiller Crowell Wellman

Personal details
- Born: September 27, 1861 Zionsville, Indiana, US
- Died: April 29, 1947 (aged 85) Evanston, Illinois, US
- Occupation: Librarian

Edwin Hatfield Anderson (September 27, 1861 – April 29, 1947) was a prominent American library leader during the first third of the 20th century, serving as director of both the Carnegie Library of Pittsburgh and the New York Public Library. He also served as the president of the American Library Association in 1913–14.

== Biography ==
Anderson was born in Zionsville, Indiana. He graduated from Wabash College in 1883, receiving his master's degree (A.M.) in 1887. Anderson worked with Andrew Carnegie to create the Carnegie Library in Pittsburgh, Pennsylvania in 1895, and served as the director of that library until 1904, when he stepped down because he could not afford to support his family on the salary. After a two-year stint (1906–08) as the head of the New York State Library and Library School, Anderson became the director of the New York Public Library in 1909, a position he held until 1934.

As a library leader, Anderson was best remembered for the librarian education programs he established in both Pittsburgh and New York City.

Anderson was married, with at least two children, daughters Charlotte and Cecile. He died in Evanston, Illinois.

Non-profit organization positions
Preceded by Henry Eduard Legler	President of the American Library Association; 1913–1914	Succeeded by Hiller Crowell Wellman
