= Mary Wright Plummer =

Former president of the American Library Association (1856–1916)

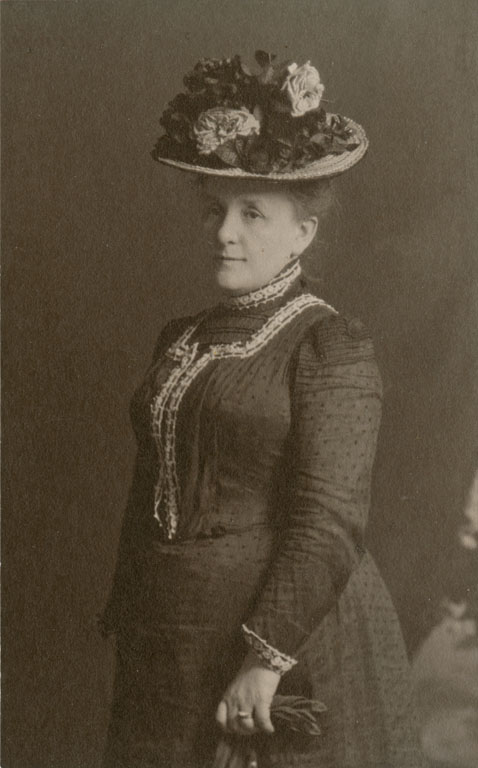

President of the American Library Association
- In office 1915–1916
- Preceded by: Hiller Crowell Wellman
- Succeeded by: Walter Lewis Brown

Personal details
- Born: March 8, 1856 Richmond, Indiana, US
- Died: September 21, 1916 (aged 60) Dixon, Illinois, US
- Education: Wellesley College; Columbia University
- Occupation: Librarian

Mary Wright Plummer (March 8, 1856, in Richmond, Indiana – September 21, 1916, in Dixon, Illinois) was an American librarian who became the second female president of the American Library Association (1915–1916).

== Biography ==
Mary Wright Plummer was born in Richmond, Indiana to Quaker parents and attended the Friends Academy. When 17, she moved with her family to Chicago. From 1881 to 1882 she studied at Wellesley College. Then she entered the first class taught by Melvil Dewey at the Columbia College School of Library Economy in January 1887. She completed the program in 1888 and served as a cataloger for two years at the Saint Louis Public Library. In 1890, she came to the Pratt Institute Free Library to help administer the library and begin a course for training new librarians. The course led to the creation of a library school which Plummer headed beginning in 1895—the same year she became head of the library. Her publications include a collection of poetry (e.g., Verses), several children's books (e.g., Stories from the Chronicle of the Cid), and books on the profession of librarianship (e.g., Hints to Small Libraries and Training for Librarianship).

Plummer held leadership roles in the library profession at a time when it was unusual for women to lead. She was the second female president of the American Library Association during 1915–1916. She served as vice president from 1900 to 1911. She also served as the president of the New York State Library Association, the New York Library Club, and the Long Island Library Club. Plummer is credited with originating the idea of ethics for the library profession, which she spoke about in an address for the Illinois Library Association titled "The Pros and Cons of Librarianship".

== Works ==
- Hints to Small Libraries, Brooklyn, NY: Pratt Institute Free Library, 1894.
- Roy and Ray in Mexico, New York, NY: H.Holt, 1907.
- The Seven Joys of Reading, White Plains, N.Y.: H.W. Wilson, 1916.
- Training for Librarianship, with Frank Keller Walter, Chicago, IL: American Library Association, 1923.

Non-profit organization positions
| Preceded by Hiller Crowell Wellman | President of the American Library Association; 1915–1916 | Succeeded by Walter Lewis Brown |
