= Library War Service =

WWI U.S. library service for soldiers

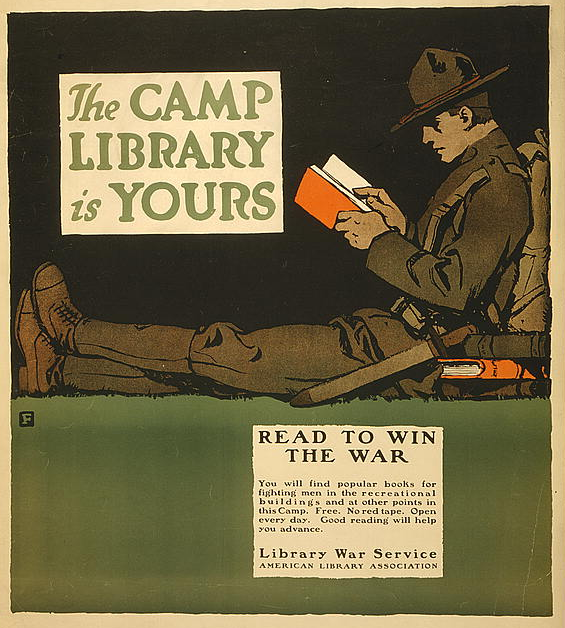
Library War Service poster by Charles Buckles Falls

The Library War Service was established by the American Library Association in 1917 to provide library services to American soldiers training in camps and serving overseas in World War I. ALA President Walter Lewis Brown initiated a partnership between the American Library Association and the Library of Congress. Between 1917 and 1920, the ALA raised $5 million from public donations, erected 36 camp libraries, distributed 7 to 10 million books and magazines, and provided library collections to more than 500 locations, including military hospitals. The Library War Service also provided books in Braille to soldiers that were blinded in battle. Library War Service librarians wore uniforms, similar to those worn by other volunteer groups like the American Red Cross, and the Library War Service provides some of the earliest examples of women participating in uniformed war service overseas.

Millions of public libraries in the United States also participated in Library War Service activities, serving as collection points for books as well as places to organize and promote the War Service campaign. The efforts of the Library War Service eventually led to the creation of many modern library services, including the creation of library departments in the Army, Navy, Veterans' Association and Merchant Marine, as well as the establishment of the American Library in Paris, which remains the largest English-language lending library on the European continent today.

== Establishment ==
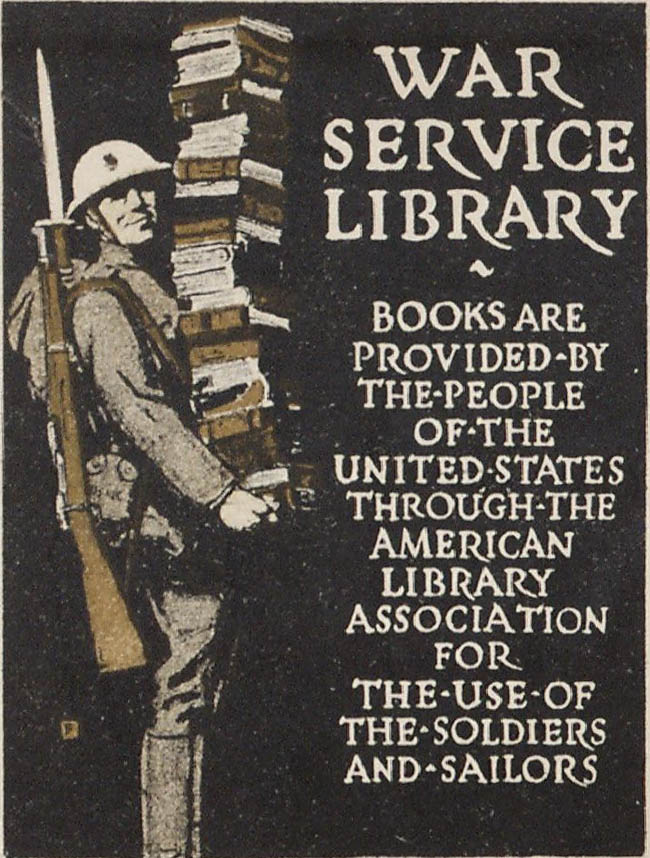
War Service Library bookplate by C. B. Falls

In 1917, as America entered World War I, the American Library Association (ALA) established the Committee on Mobilization and War Service Plans. Shortly after its formation, the ALA's committee was invited by the Department of War's Commission on Training Camp Activities to provide library services to soldiers. Joining the Young Men's Christian Association (YMCA), the Young Women's Christian Association (YWCA), the Salvation Army, the Jewish Welfare Board, the Knights of Columbus and the War Camp Community Service, the American Library Association became one of the "Seven Sisters" providing social, health and welfare services to soldiers in camps under the auspices of the Commission on Training Camp Activities. From 1917 to 1919 George Burwell Utley served as executive secretary of the Library War Service.

Though the ALA had only 3,300 members and an annual budget of $25,000, the Library War Service eventually raised over five million dollars and collected over ten million books for distribution. At the height of the Library War Service, even this large collection was unable to meet all of the military's needs.

== Camp libraries ==
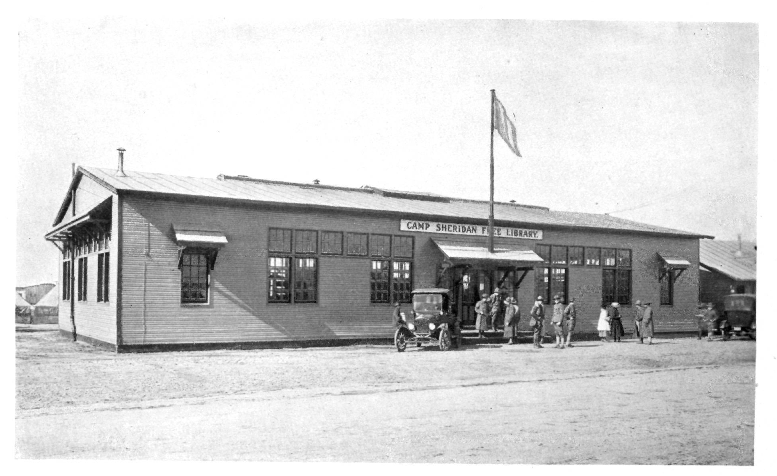
The camp library at Camp Sheridan. World War I camp libraries all had a similar design, varying only in length. Most libraries were equipped with a motor vehicle (pictured) to transport books.

With the help of a $320,000 grant from the Carnegie Corporation, the Library War Service established 36 camp libraries at military bases and training camps. The Carnegie Corporation and the Library War Service also funded 1,100 library workers to staff camp libraries and military hospitals. The 36 camp libraries were simple wooden buildings, similar to World War I canteens. The libraries were designed by architect Edward L. Tilton, and provided space for 10,000 volumes and around 200 readers, in buildings that were only between 90 and 120 feet long. Most camp libraries were also provisioned with a small car for the transportation of books. National campaigns provided books to the training camps, hospitals, Red Cross Houses, and small military encampments at home and abroad.

The libraries were a place for soldiers to gather, relax and enjoy a touch of home and civilization. Libraries at Camp Upton and Camp Sherman received special permission to install fireplaces to encourage this environment. However, Library War Service books were not just used for entertainment and diversion. They also contained information required for effective military operations and they helped prepare soldiers socially and intellectually for life after the war. In 1918, a librarian at Camp Meade wrote the following to a reporter about his troops' need for books:

We are having repeated calls for technical handbooks and textbooks. We want all kinds of engineering handbooks, mechanics handbooks, books on engineering and books on all branches of the service. They cannot be too technical for the men. You will be interested to know how quickly the newly purchased books are snapped up. Of the six copies of Thompson's Electricity, four are out now and were out within a week of when they were ready.

At the height of the war, nearly every YMCA, Knights of Columbus, Young Men's Hebrew Association and base hospital at a barracks was used as distribution point for War Service books, and nearly every book was in constant use. Books and periodicals were minimally cataloged and camp librarians were either volunteers or were paid a small annual salary of around $1,200. With the Army and Navy being made up of "about every nationality on Earth", camp libraries contained books in dozens of languages including Spanish, French, Italian, Yiddish, Chinese, and Russian.

The Library War Service continued their work overseas, as well. On August 29, 1918, the American Library in Paris or Paris Library opened with the aim of collecting a large volume of technical handbooks and textbooks to distribute to the American Expeditionary Force and other books to distribute to the English-speaking residents of France. Over the next year, the library acquired approximately 15,000 volumes, circulating around 4,500 volumes each month. Most of the volumes related to American history, economics, sociology, and technology. Around the same time, Burton Stevenson, the American Library Association representative to Europe, established a books-by-mail program. Librarians could send books through the army postal service to units and troops. This service was extremely popular with the AEF. In the six months between January and July 1919, the Library War Service-run Paris Library’s mailing department circulated over 30,000 books just to individual soldiers (ninety percent of whom requested the library’s nonfiction volumes) and four times that amount in bulk mail orders to whole units. Sometimes requests for books went over 2,000 a day.

The YMCA also distributed nearly as many books to soldiers as did the Library War Service, but the Library War Service collections were considered more diversified and did hold as many duplicate copies as did the YMCA collection. In addition, many YMCA books were sold to troops whereas all Library War Service books were free.

== Uniforms ==
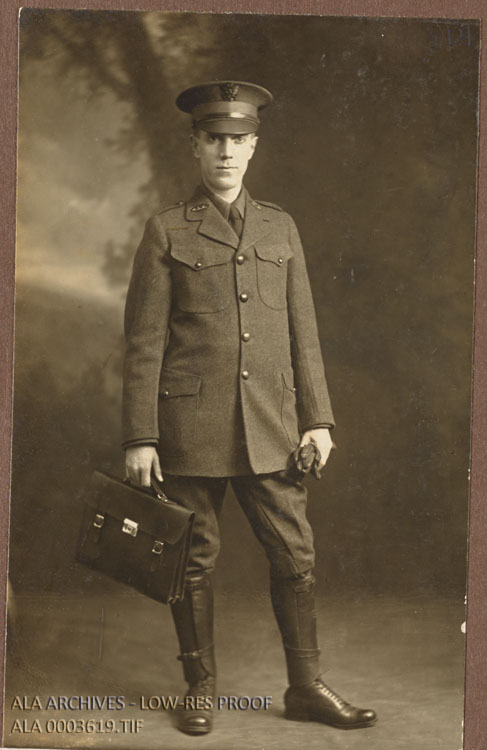
Dr. M. Llewellyn Raney, librarian from Johns Hopkins University, in his Library War Service uniform

Like other volunteers during the war, especially the Red Cross and the Salvation Army, Library War Service librarians wore uniforms while performing their duties. There were separate uniforms for camp librarians and hospital librarians, as well as separate uniforms for men and women. Camp librarians wore a forest green uniform, similar to a military uniform, with ALA pins and patches that marked the wearer as a War Service librarian.

Female librarians working in hospital libraries had a unique uniform of naturally colored pongee. The uniform consisted of a belted dress with a white collar, either a brown ribbon or Windsor-style tie, and a straw hat with a brown band. The hospital librarians could choose this uniform or a uniform similar to the camp uniforms, but in the naturally colored pongee.

Most women who wore uniforms during World War I were members of civilian relief services like the Library War Service. While men could have their uniforms locally tailored, women librarians' uniforms were custom-made by Best & Company of New York City, reflecting the challenges of providing military uniforms for women in the early 20th century.

== Legacy ==
The work of the Library War Service continued after the end of the war, hitting its peak in April 1919. After the war, the U.S. military assimilated most wartime library services, and ALA-managed libraries were transformed into military-managed libraries. Following the example set by the Library War Service, formal, professional library departments were created in the U.S. Army and Navy. Library service in military hospitals also continued, first under U.S. Public Health Service, then under the sponsorship of the Veteran's Bureau, and today under the Veterans' Administration (VA). Over 300 naval bases were supplied with books by the Library War Service, but after the war, no government agency wanted to be responsible for continuing library service to merchant ships. In 1920, Alice Sturtevant Howard created the American Merchant Marine Library Association, with the help of the Library War Service, to benefit the Merchant Marine and the U.S. Coast Guard. The Library War Service donated 65,000 volumes and $5,000 to the organization after its creation.

All surplus books that the military did not need, as the Library War Service's first priority was the military, went to state library commissions. Over 300,000 books were sent to state library agencies in proportion to how many servicemen came from each state, and from there, the books went to libraries in need and other public service organizations.

The Library War Service also has a lasting civilian legacy. The American Library Association established the American Library in Paris to provide English books to American soldiers serving in France. The library continues to operate today as the largest English-language lending library in continental Europe. Many library services, such as the distribution of Braille books through the mail, were first implemented by the Library War Service during World War I. The American Library Association allocated funds to purchase volumes written in Braille. Donations paid for the costs of embossing Braille onto metal plates, then the ALA paid for printing, binding, and distributing these materials.
