= Walter Lewis Brown =

American librarian

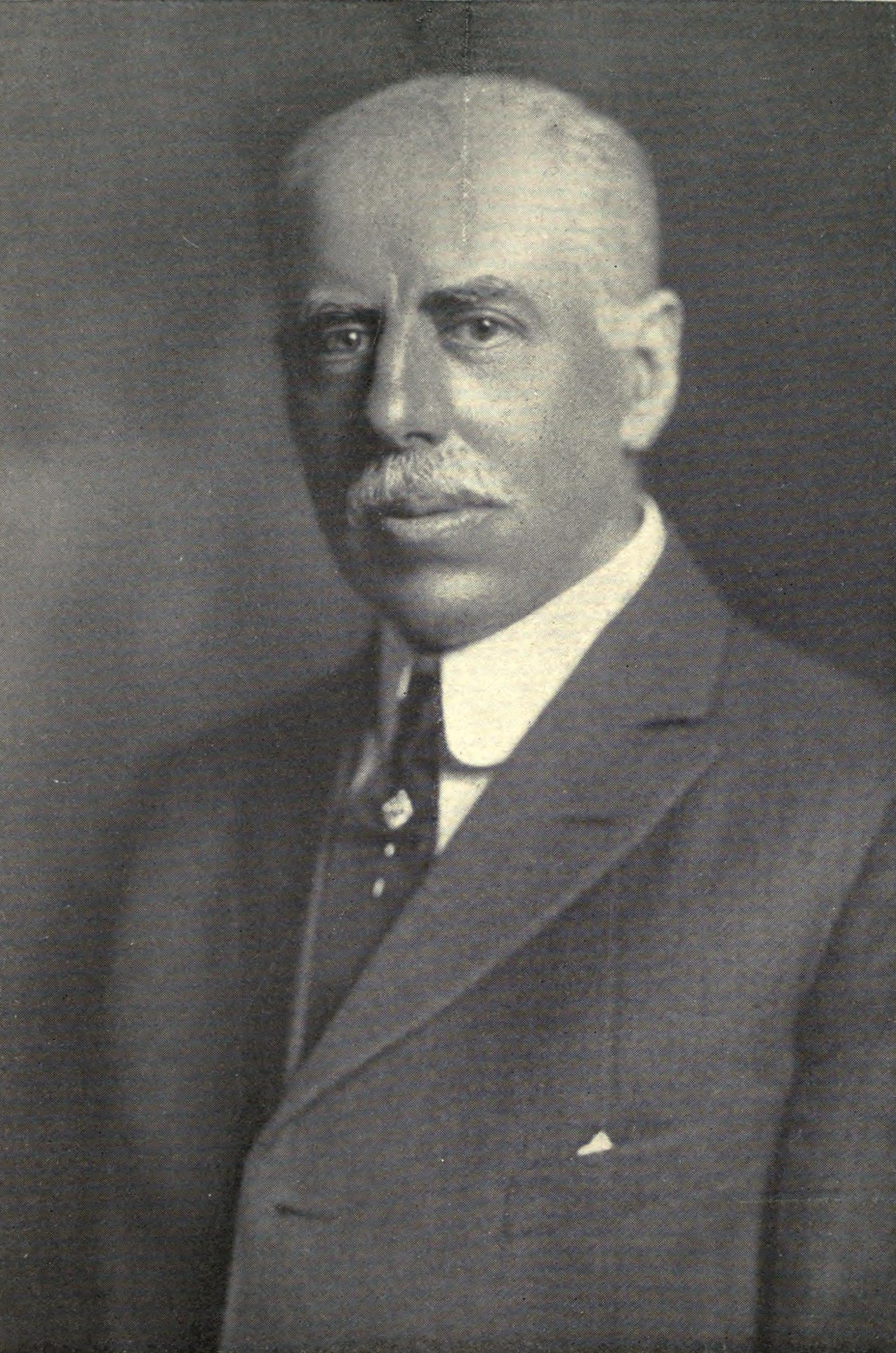

President of the American Library Association
- In office 1916–1917
- Preceded by: Mary Wright Plummer
- Succeeded by: Thomas Lynch Montgomery

Personal details
- Born: January 4, 1861
- Died: October 16, 1931 (aged 70)
- Occupation: Librarian

Walter Lewis Brown (January 4, 1861 – October 16, 1931) was an American librarian. Brown served as president of the American Library Association from 1916 to 1917. Brown was instrumental in establishing a public library in Buffalo, New York, now the Buffalo and Erie County Public Library. Brown led the American Library Association at the beginning of the first World War. In that role, Brown initiated a partnership between the American Library Association and the Library of Congress to create the ALA War Service Committee.

== See also ==
- Buffalo and Erie County Public Library

Non-profit organization positions
Preceded by Mary Wright Plummer	President of the American Library Association; 1916–1917	Succeeded by Thomas Lynch Montgomery
