= State Library of Pennsylvania =

Coordinates: 40.26450°N 76.88077°W

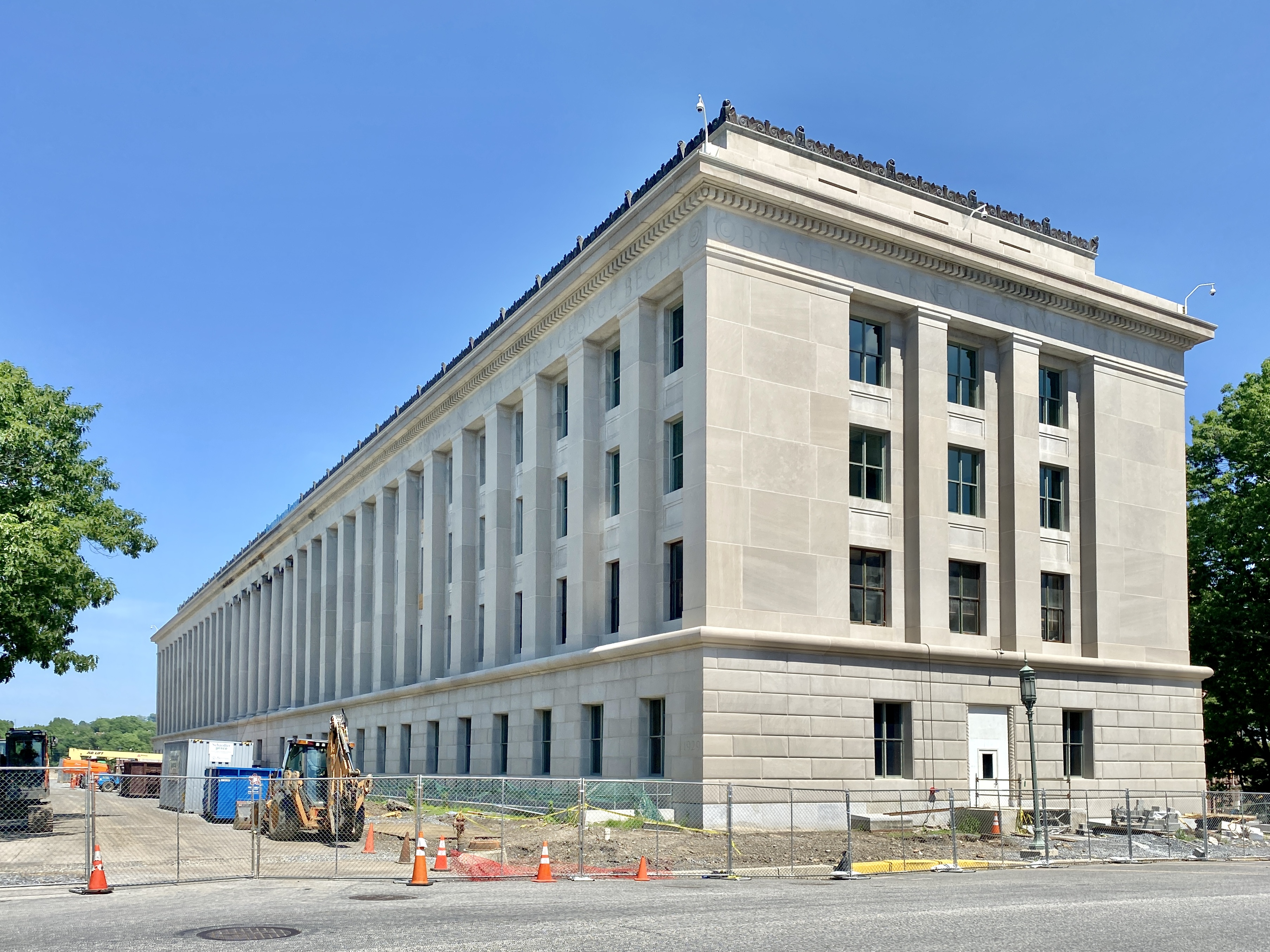
- The State Library of Pennsylvania is housed within the Forum Building in the Pennsylvania State Capitol Complex
- Location: 607 South Drive, Harrisburg, PA, 17126
- Type: Public
- Architects: William Gehron and Sydney Ross

Other information
- Website: statelibrary.pa.gov/Pages/default.aspx

The State Library of Pennsylvania is one of the largest research libraries in the Commonwealth of Pennsylvania. Until 1971 it was known as the Pennsylvania State Library.

The Office of Commonwealth Libraries, within the Pennsylvania Department of Education, has holdings in almost every area of human concern. It provides information and materials from its collections and automated resources to state government, state institutions and the general public. It is also charged with maintaining a definitive collection of publications of all agencies of the Commonwealth and serves as a Regional Depository for United States Government Publications.

Mission: "The State Library provides information for State Government and citizens while collecting and preserving our written heritage through materials published for, by and about Pennsylvania."

== History ==
The State Library of Pennsylvania began as a social library for the senators and representatives of the Pennsylvania General Assembly. Its collection of materials started on December 5, 1745, after the Pennsylvania General Assembly asked Benjamin Franklin to obtain a copy of Statutes at Large and reference maps. Within the next decade, the assembly spent over £1,000 on “legal materials as well as history, geography, philosophy, and science”. For several years, the Pennsylvania House and Senate did not consult each other when gathering materials for the library. Therefore, on February 28, 1816, Governor Simon Snyder signed the “Act to Provide for the Better Preservation and Increase of the Library of This Commonwealth”, which consolidated collections, provided a budget for obtaining materials, and allowed for the appointment of a librarian.

In 1822, after the capital building was moved to Harrisburg, Pennsylvania, the library took residence on the second floor. During most of the 1870s, the library “focused primarily on obtaining materials pertinent to legislative business", resulting in a collection that was not diverse.

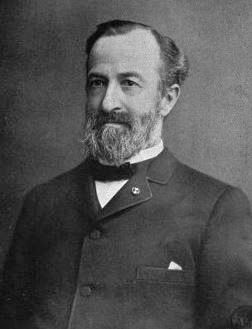
William Henry Egle, M.D., Pennsylvania State Librarian, c. 1890s

William Henry Egle, the state librarian from 1887 to 1898, was instrumental in diversifying the library collection. As part of his term, Egle emphasized the importance of expanding the library's newspaper collection to include one or two papers from every county depending on their population size. Egle was also influential in obtaining a larger space for the library. During his term, Egle warned of unsafe conditions in the library such as fire hazards and poor insulation of electrical wires. After forming a close relationship with the governor, Egle and a team of forty men were able to move more than 100,000 books to a new library building in December 1894.

In February 1897, during Egle's term, the old capitol building where the Pennsylvania State Library used to reside, went up in flames. The materials that had been moved to the new building were saved, but some vital historical and legislative documents that remained in the capital had been burned before they had been copied.

George E. Reed was the state librarian from 1899 to 1902. During that time he created a catalog of the entire collection. Although it was not the first catalog of the collection, it was the most accurate and extensive one that had been attempted.

The next state librarian, Thomas Lynch Montgomery, made significant advances to the library. His tenure lasted from 1903 to 1921. He worked with other library organizations to improve access of materials to people across the state, and the state library collection was vastly diversified. Montgomery was a vital influence in the development of the Pennsylvania State Archives in 1903 and in the State Museum of Pennsylvania in 1905, which were divisions of the library. However, in 1941 these two divisions were separated from the state library.

== Location ==
The State Library of Pennsylvania is located at Commonwealth Ave. & Walnut St. (Forum Building) in downtown Harrisburg, Pennsylvania. It has been at this location since 1931. The library is open to the public year-round.

== See also ==
- List of Pennsylvania state agencies
- List of libraries in the United States
