= Henry Livingston Elmendorf =

American librarian (1852–1906)

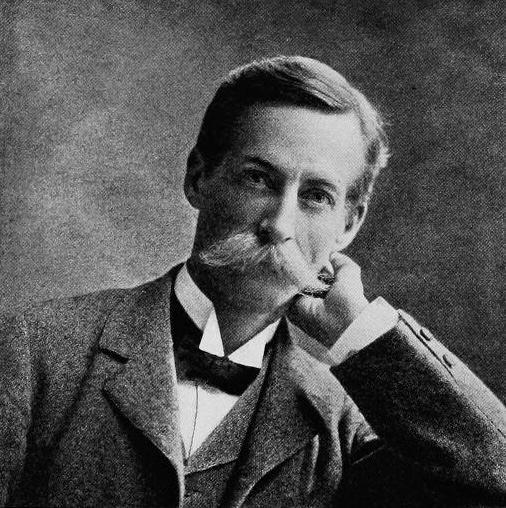
- Born: October 10, 1852; Brooklyn, New York, US
- Died: July 6, 1906 (aged 53); Buffalo, New York, US
- Education: Brooklyn Polytechnic Institute
- Occupation: Librarian
- Employer: Buffalo Public Library
- Spouse: Theresa Elmendorf

Henry Livingston Elmendorf (October 10, 1852 – July 6, 1906) was an American librarian. He served as director of the Buffalo Public Library and secretary (equivalent to executive director) of the American Library Association (ALA) from 1895 to 1896.

== Life and career ==
Elmendorf was born on October 10, 1852, in Brooklyn, New York, to Anthony and Sarah (Clark) Elmendorf. His father was a minister in the Dutch Reformed Church and was a descendant of New York's original Dutch settlers. Elmendorf attended the Brooklyn Polytechnic Institute (now part of New York University) and worked as an assistant at the Gardner Sage Library in New Brunswick, New Jersey, in 1877. He subsequently worked in the private sector from 1878 to 1891, when he became head of the public library in St. Joseph, Missouri. He concurrently served the American Library Association (ALA) as Secretary from 1895 to 1896 and then as vice president in 1897.

On October 3, 1896, Elmendorf married Theresa Hubbell West (1855–1932), who was head librarian at the Milwaukee Public Library at the time. The couple had met while attending an American Library Association conference. Immediately after their marriage, they moved to London, where Elmendorf managed the London office of the Library Bureau. In July 1897, they returned to the United States and settled in Buffalo, New York, where Elmendorf had been hired to lead the newly reconstituted Buffalo Public Library. There he pursued innovative and patron-friendly initiatives such as establishing an open shelving room of 10,000 volumes and opening branch libraries in schools.

His wife, Theresa Elmendorf, did not hold formal employment during their ten years of marriage, but she worked as her husband's unofficial advisor and "silent partner." She also published a 150-page descriptive catalog of the Buffalo Public Library's collection of manuscripts and served as president of the New York Library Association in 1904–1905. When Elmendorf died after a two-year illness on July 6, 1906, Buffalo's library board appointed her as vice librarian. She held this office until her retirement in 1926.
