= Theresa Elmendorf =

American librarian (1855–1932)

Theresa West Elmendorf
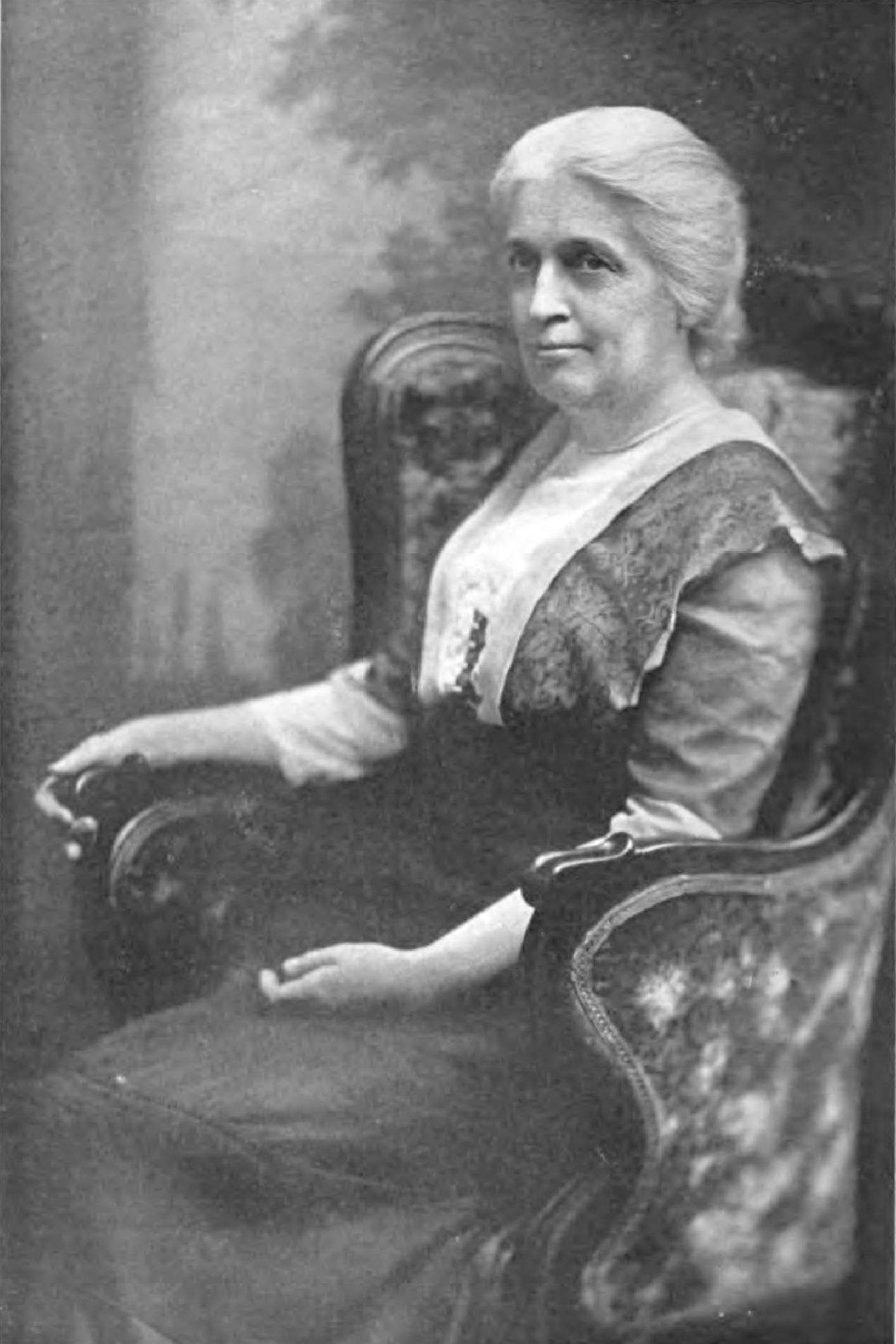
- A 1912 illustration of Elmendorf

President of the American Library Association
- In office 1911–1912
- Preceded by: James Ingersoll Wyer
- Succeeded by: Henry Eduard Legler

Personal details
- Born: Theresa Hubbel West; November 1, 1855; Pardeeville, Wisconsin, U.S.
- Died: September 4, 1932 (aged 76)
- Spouse: Henry Livingston Elmendorf (m. 1896; died 1906)
- Occupation: Librarian
- Known for: First female president of the ALA

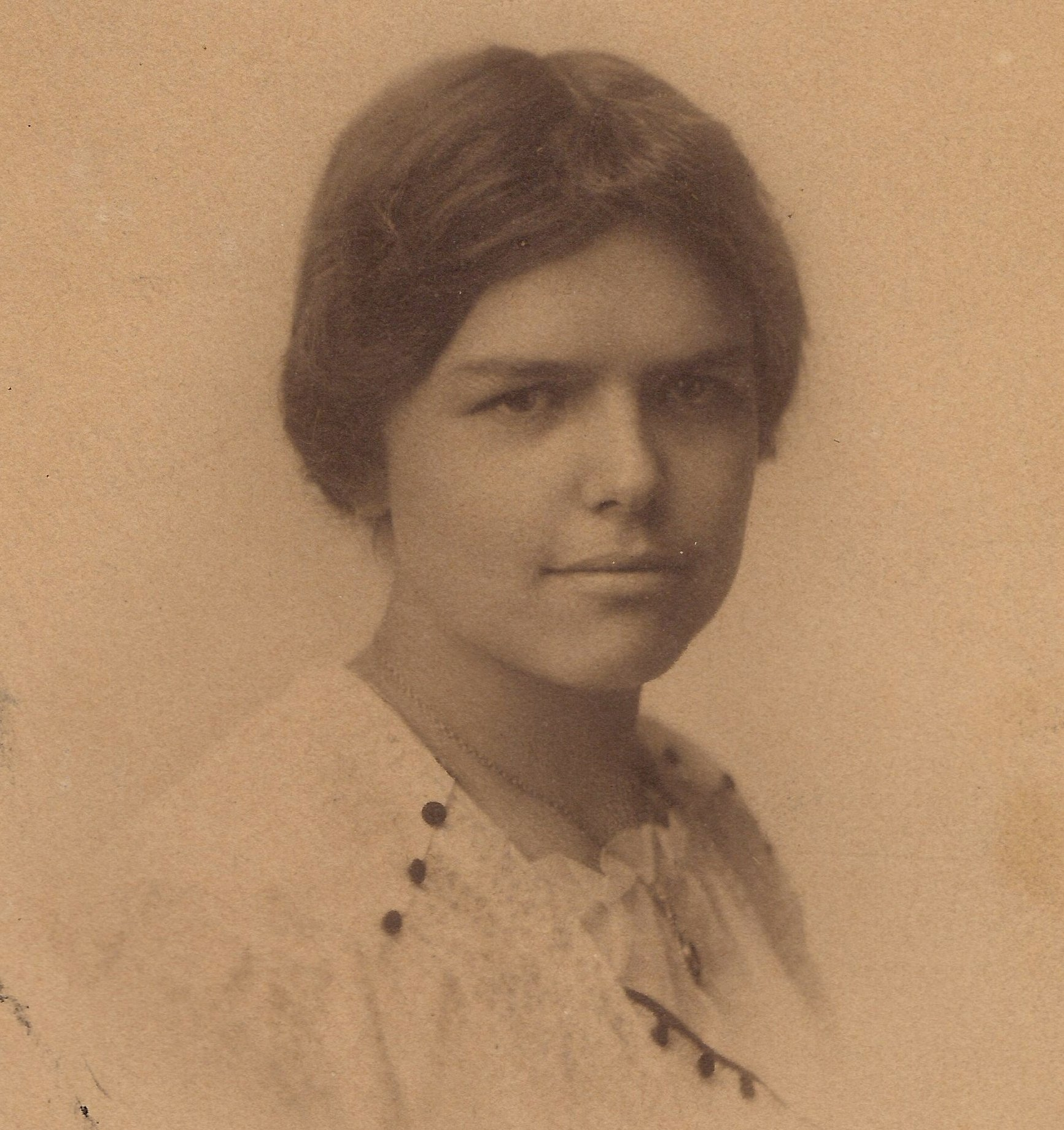
Elmendorf at the time of her graduation from Vassar College, c. 1877, at approximately age 22

Theresa West Elmendorf (November 1, 1855 – September 4, 1932) was an American librarian and the first female president of the American Library Association, serving from 1911 to 1912.

== Bibliography ==
- Rooney, Paul M. (1978). "Elmendorf, Theresa Hubbell West". In George Sylvan Bobinski; Jesse Hauk Shera; Bohdan S. Wynar (eds.). Dictionary of American Library Biography. Littleton, Colorado: Libraries Unlimited. pp. 159–160. ISBN 0-87287-180-0.
- Thomison, Dennis (1993). "Elmendorf, Theresa West". In Robert Wedgeworth (ed.). World Encyclopedia of Library and Information Services (3rd ed.). Chicago: ALA Editions. pp. 279–280. ISBN 0-8389-0609-5.

== Notes ==
Non-profit organization positions
Preceded by James Ingersoll Wyer	President of the American Library Association; 1911–1912	Succeeded by Henry Eduard Legler
