= Steve Elmendorf =

American lobbyist and political advisor

Steven A. Elmendorf
- Born: Summit, New Jersey, U.S.
- Education: Trinity College (1982)
- Occupations: Lobbyist; Political advisor
- Years active: 1984–present
- Known for: Chief of staff to Dick Gephardt; Deputy campaign manager for John Kerry (2004)
- Spouse: Elio Artese (m. 2025)
- Website: elmendorfstrategies.com

Steven A. Elmendorf is a lobbyist in Washington, D.C., who was a senior advisor to House Democratic Leader Dick Gephardt for 12 years, serving as his chief of staff after 1997. Elmendorf was also deputy campaign manager for U.S. Senator John Kerry, the 2004 Democratic nominee for president.

== Early life and education ==
Elmendorf was born in Summit, New Jersey. He graduated from Trinity College in 1982.

== Early career ==
Elmendorf began his political career as a field organizer on the Mondale for President campaign. He subsequently served as chief of staff for U.S. Representative Dennis Eckart and as a staff aide to Senator Brock Adams.

Elmendorf joined Gephardt's staff in 1992 and became chief of staff in 1997. He managed the floor for House Democrats and designed the Democratic Caucus' strategic response to major legislative issues, including the impeachment of President Bill Clinton, the Clinton 1993 economic program, the Clinton effort to reform health care in 1994, NAFTA, the 1997 Balanced Budget Act, McCain–Feingold campaign finance reform, and the Iraq war resolution.

Roll Call newspaper named him annually as one of the 50 most powerful staff members on Capitol Hill during his tenure in the leader's office. He managed four of Gephardt's successful campaigns for Democratic leader and organized the congressman's political activities at the Democratic Congressional Campaign Committee and Gephardt's political action committee. The House of Representatives elected Elmendorf as a minority officer in the 105th, 106th, and 107th Congress, granting him privileges equivalent to former House members.

== Presidential campaigns ==
Elmendorf served as chief of staff and senior advisor for Gephardt's 2004 Democratic presidential campaign. In 2004, as deputy campaign manager for Kerry's 2004 presidential campaign, Elmendorf served as the primary campaign liaison to U.S. senators, members of Congress, governors, and mayors. He supervised field operations in 21 states and participated on the strategic team for overall campaign planning and outreach to constituency groups and organized labor.

== Lobbying career ==
Elmendorf and Republican Jack Oliver served as co-presidents of Bryan Cave Strategies L.L.C., a lobbying firm affiliated with the law firm Bryan Cave LLP.

Elmendorf later founded Elmendorf/Ryan LLC, a government relations and strategic counseling firm he co-owns with Jimmy Ryan. The firm represents corporations, trade associations, and nonprofit organizations. Elmendorf/Ryan employs what has been described as an "all-star team of Democratic revolving-door lobbyists...including former top aides to Democratic floor leaders Harry Reid, Dick Gephardt, Steny Hoyer and Nancy Pelosi."

Elmendorf has appeared frequently on television talk shows, including Hardball with Chris Matthews, CNBC's Capitol Report, Fox News, and CNN's Crossfire. He has lectured at the Institute of Politics at Harvard University's John F. Kennedy School of Government and at his alma mater, Trinity College in Hartford, Connecticut.

In November 2011, The New Republic included Elmendorf on its list of Washington's most powerful, least famous people.

=== 2006 elections ===
In January 2006, Elmendorf drew criticism from left-wing Democratic bloggers after being quoted in a Washington Post story as saying, "The bloggers and online donors represent an important resource for the party, but they are not representative of the majority you need to win elections. The trick will be to harness their energy and their money without looking like you are a captive of the activist left." Markos Moulitsas, founder of the Daily Kos blog, responded: "Here's notice, any Democrat associated with Elmendorf will be outed. The netroots can then decide for itself whether it wants to provide some of that energy and money to that candidate. There's nothing 'extreme left' with demanding Democrats act like Democrats, no matter how much these out-of-touch and self-important beltway insiders think it is."

Also in 2006, Elmendorf supported U.S. Senator Joe Lieberman's independent reelection bid after Lieberman lost the Democratic primary. Elmendorf was listed on Lieberman's campaign website as part of the "national chapter" of "Dems for Joe."

== Personal life ==
Elmendorf is openly gay. He married Elio Artese in 2025.

== See also ==
- Lobbying in the United States
