= Cooley (surname) =

Cooley is a surname of Anglo-Saxon and Irish origin.

- Alford W. Cooley (1873–1913), justice of the New Mexico Territorial Supreme Court
- Alice Kingsbury Cooley (1839–1910), British-born American actress, author, and poet
- Bertram Cooley (1874–1935), South African cricketer
- Carroll Cooley (1935–2023), American police detective
- Charles Horton Cooley (1864–1929), American sociologist
- Chelsea Cooley (born 1983), Miss USA 2005
- Chris Cooley (born 1982), American professional football player
- David P. Cooley (1960–2009), American test pilot
- Dennis Cooley (born 1944), Canadian poet, professor at the University of Manitoba
- Denton Cooley (1920−2016), American physician and heart surgeon
- Ed Cooley (born 1969), American college basketball coach
- Emily M. J. Cooley (1831–1917), American religious and temperance leader
- Garth Cooley (fl. 1980s–2010s), American taekwondo competitor
- Gin Cooley (fl. 2000s–2020s), American singer, model and psychotherapist
- Haskell Cooley (fl. 1970s), member of American southern gospel quartet The Cathedrals
- Horace S. Cooley (1806–1850), American politician
- Jack Cooley (born 1991), American basketball player
- Jacquelin Smith Cooley (1883–1965), American botanist and mycologist
- James Cooley (1926–2016), American mathematician, developer of the Cooley–Tukey fast Fourier transform
- Jodi Cooley (fl. 1990s–2020s), American physicist
- Joe Cooley (1924–1973), Irish accordionist
- John K. Cooley (1927–2008), American journalist and author, specializing in terrorism and the Middle East
- Logan Cooley (born 2004), American ice hockey player
- Lou Cooley (dates unknown), American 19th-century gunfighter, friend of Wyatt Earp at the time of the Gunfight at the O.K. Corral (1881)
- Mason Cooley (1927–2002), American aphorist
- Mike Cooley (engineer) (1934–2020), Irish-born engineer and workplace activist
- Mike Cooley (American football) (c. 1920–1988), American football coach
- Mike Cooley (musician) (born 1966), American guitarist/singer/lyricist, and co-founder of the rock/alt country band, Drive-By Truckers
- Quinton Cooley (born 2001), American football player
- Rita Nealon Cooley (1919/1920–2006), American political scientist
- Rusty Cooley (born 1970), American guitarist
- Ryan Cooley (born 1988), Canadian television actor
- Spade Cooley (1910–1969), American western swing musician, murdered his wife
- Steve Cooley (born 1947), American prosecutor for Los Angeles County
- Thomas Cooley (architect) (1740–1784), Irish architect
- Thomas Benton Cooley (1871–1945), American pediatrician, first described β-thalassemia
- Thomas F. Cooley (1943–2021), American professor of economics at the New York University Stern School of Business
- Thomas M. Cooley (1824–1898), American jurist, Chief Justice of the Michigan Supreme Court
- Thomas R. Cooley (1893–1959), United States Navy admiral
- Tonya Cooley (born 1980), American actress and reality television personality
- Troy Cooley (born 1965), cricketer for the Tasmanian Tigers
- Wes Cooley (motorcyclist) (1956–2021), American motorcycle racer
- Wes Cooley (politician) (1932–2015), American politician, congressman from Oregon
- William Cooley (1783–1863), American settler in Florida
- William Desborough Cooley (1795?–1883), Irish geographer
- William T. Cooley (born 1966), American major general in the United States Air Force
- Winnifred Harper Cooley (1874–1967), American feminist author
- Ken Cooley (1953-present) American California State Assemblyman
