= List of Randolph–Macon College alumni =

Randolph–Macon College is a private liberal arts college in Ashland, Virginia. Following is a partial list of its notable alumni.

== Academics ==
- Benjamin Lee Arnold (1862), academic and the second president of Oregon State University
- George E. Barnett, professor of economics at Johns Hopkins University
- William Malone Baskervill, writer and professor of the English language and literature at Vanderbilt University
- Lambuth McGeehee Clarke, second president of Virginia Wesleyan College
- John W. Craine Jr., president of SUNY Maritime College
- Richard Beale Davis, academic who specialised in the history of the Southern United States
- James F. Dowdell (1840), second president of the East Alabama College, now known as Auburn University, and representative from Alabama to the United States Congress
- Mary Virginia Gaver, librarian
- William Conrad Gibbons (1949), American historian and foreign policy expert
- Meta Glass, president of Sweet Briar College
- John Lesslie Hall, literary scholar at the College of William & Mary from 1888 to 1928
- M. Thomas Inge, Robert Emory Blackwell Professor of Humanities at Randolph–Macon College
- Samuel Lander, Methodist minister who founded what later became Lander University
- Holland Nimmons McTyeire (1844), bishop of the Methodist Episcopal Church, South; a co-founder of Vanderbilt University in Nashville, Tennessee
- Henry Ludwell Moore, economist at Columbia University
- Christopher Morse, Christian theologian and professor of theology and ethics at Union Theological Seminary
- Thomas G. Pullen, fifth president of the University of Baltimore
- James I. Robertson Jr., historian on the American Civil War and professor at Virginia Tech
- Andrew Sledd, first president of the University of Florida
- Wilbur Fisk Tillett, professor of systematic theology and dean of the theological faculty at Vanderbilt University

== Art ==
- Worden Day, painter, printmaker, and sculptor
- Thomas Downing, painter, associated with the Washington Color Field Movement
- Mitchell Johnson, contemporary artist
- Jim Sanborn (1968), sculptor, created the unsolved sculpture Kryptos in 1990

== Entertainment ==
- Marty Brennaman, broadcaster for the Cincinnati Reds
- Dorian Leigh, model, one of the earliest icons of the fashion industry
- Nader Talebzadeh, film director

== Law ==
- William H. Hodges, Virginia Court of Appeals judge, Virginia Senate, and Virginia House of Delegates
- E. Barrett Prettyman (1910), United States federal judge after whom the federal courthouse in Washington, D.C., is named
- Lemuel F. Smith, justice of the Supreme Court of Virginia and Virginia House of Delegates

== Literature and journalism ==
- Ted Bell, author of suspense novels, president and chief creative officer of the Leo Burnett Company in Chicago; and worldwide creative director of Young & Rubicam
- Seth Clabough, novelist, English professor
- Edwin L. James (1909), journalist and war correspondent who covered World War I for The New York Times
- Iris Kelso, journalist

== Military ==
- Claude A. Swanson, U.S. secretary of the Navy, U.S. senator, and governor of Virginia
- David W. Taylor (1881), rear admiral, U.S. Navy, and chief constructor of the Navy during World War I.

== Politics ==
- E. Almer Ames Jr., member of the Virginia Senate
- Larry Preston Bryant Jr. (1986), member of the Virginia House of Delegates who served as Secretary of Natural Resources under Governor Tim Kaine
- William Duval Cardwell, Virginia politician; represented Hanover County in the Virginia House of Delegates, and served as that body's speaker from 1906 until 1908
- Mildred Stafford Cherry, First Lady of North Carolina
- James Rives Childs (1912), consular and diplomatic official for over thirty years
- David Clopton (1840), U.S. congressman from Alabama, and associate justice of the Alabama Supreme Court
- Michael G. Comeau, former member of the Maryland House of Delegates
- James F. Dowdell (1840), second president of the East Alabama College, now known as Auburn University, from 1868 to 1870, and a representative from Alabama to the United States Congress
- Patrick H. Drewry (1896), U.S. representative and state legislator from Virginia
- Randy Forbes (1974) U.S. congressman from Virginia
- Porter Hardy Jr. (1922), U.S. representative from Virginia
- William H. Hodges, Virginia Court of Appeals judge, Virginia Senate, and Virginia House of Delegates
- Joseph Chappell Hutcheson Sr. (1861), Texas politician and a Democratic member of the Texas House of Representatives and the United States House of Representatives
- Thomas Jordan Jarvis (1861), 44th governor of North Carolina from 1879 to 1885; later a U.S. senator
- Chris Jones (1980), member of the Virginia House of Delegates; in 2014, he was named chair of the House Appropriations Committee
- James A. Jones, Virginia Senate
- John J. Kindred, served five terms as U.S. representative from New York
- Ira M. Lechner, Virginia House of Delegates
- John Letcher, representative in the United States Congress, was the 34th governor of Virginia during the American Civil War, and later served in the Virginia General Assembly
- Blanche Lincoln, United States senator from Arkansas
- Drew Maloney, Assistant Secretary of the Treasury for Legislative Affairs
- David W. Marsden (1970), member of the Virginia Senate
- Walter Hines Page, journalist, U.S. ambassador to the United Kingdom
- Margaret Ransone (1992), elected to the Virginia House of Delegates in 2011
- James Williams Riddleberger (1924), U.S. ambassador to Greece
- William McKendree Robbins (1850), U.S. representative from North Carolina
- William M. Robbins, U.S. representative from North Carolina
- Hugh Scott, Republican U.S. congressman, U.S. senator from Pennsylvania
- Matt Shaheen, Republican member of the Texas House of Representatives from Plano, Texas
- Lemuel F. Smith, justice of the Supreme Court of Virginia and Virginia House of Delegates
- Walter Leak Steele, U.S. congressman
- Claude A. Swanson, U.S. senator, governor of Virginia, and U.S. secretary of the Navy
- Joshua Soule Zimmerman (1892), member of the West Virginia House of Delegates

== Religion ==
- James Cannon Jr., bishop of the Methodist Episcopal Church, South
- Collins Denny, bishop of the Methodist Episcopal Church, South
- John Stanley Grauel, Methodist minister and American Christian Zionist leader
- Carter Heyward, feminist theologian and priest in the Episcopal Church
- Holland Nimmons McTyeire (1844), bishop of the Methodist Episcopal Church, South; co-founder of Vanderbilt University
- Paul Reeves, seventh bishop of Georgia in the Episcopal Church in the United States of America

== Science ==
- Jacquelin Smith Cooley, botanist and pathologist in the Bureau of Plant Industry with the U.S. Department of Agriculture
- Lemuel Whitley Diggs, pathologist who specialized in sickle cell anemia and hematology
- John H. Gibbons (1949), scientist and nuclear physicist, director of the White House Office of Science and Technology Policy under President Bill Clinton
- Erica Glasper, behavioral neuroscientist
- Mary Stuart MacDougall, biologist and instructor and researcher at the Marine Biological Laboratory
- William Alphonso Murrill (1889), mycologist and assistant Curator at the New York Botanical Garden
- William Carter Stubbs, chemist and sugar industry researcher
- George D. Watkins, solid-state physicist at the General Electric Research Laboratory

== Sports ==
- Jay Bateman, college football player and coach
- Michael Breed, professional golf instructor and host of The Golf Fix
- Christopher Chenery, owner/breeder of record for Thoroughbred horse racing's U.S. Triple Crown champion Secretariat
- Mike DeLotto, college football coach
- Milt Drewer, college football coach and athletic administrator
- Beth Dunkenberger (1988), head coach of the Virginia Tech women's basketball team
- Chris Gerlufsen, college basketball coach
- Paul Gilliford, Major League Baseball player
- Tim Landis, college football coach
- George Preston Marshall, founder and first owner of the NFL Washington Redskins
- Gregg Marshall (1985), head men's former basketball coach at Wichita State
- Brian Partlow, head coach of the Arena Football League's Austin Wranglers
- Colin Selby, Major League Baseball player
- Chris Snyder, college football coach and athletics administrator
- Howard Stevens, professional football player
- Gary Strickler, athletic director at Boston University
- Syd Thrift, Major League Baseball player, scout, and general manager
- Frank Walker, Major League Baseball player
