= Yawn =

Reflex

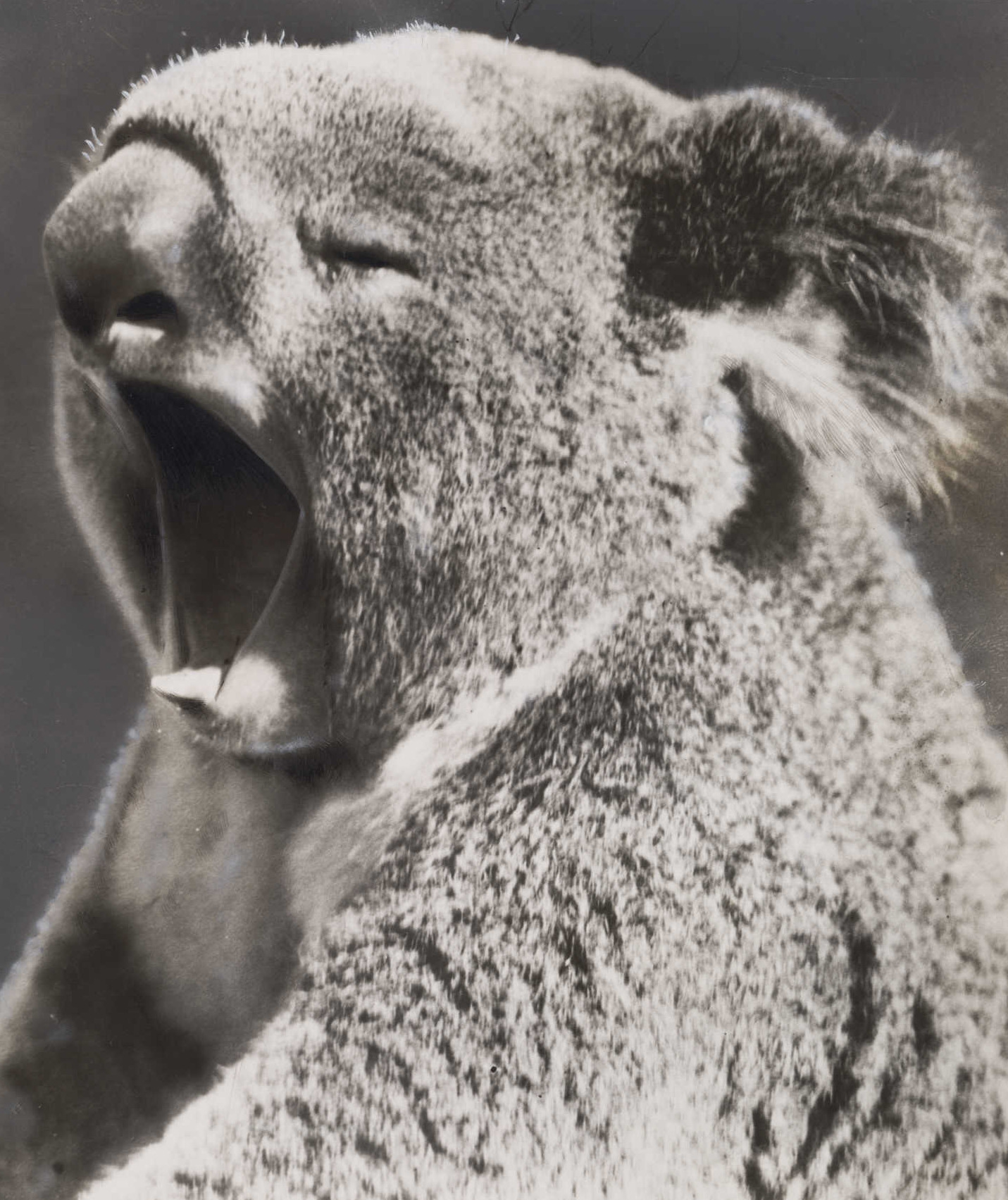
- A yawning koala, 1936
- Organisms: Vertebrates
- Biological system: Nervous system
- Health: Unaffected or beneficial
- Action: Involuntary
- Stimuli: Fatigue; Boredom; Stress; Sleepiness; Others mirror neuron reflex
- Method: Complete extension of jaw, inhalation, eyes close, stretching of the eardrum, exhalation
- Duration: Usually 6 seconds

A yawn is a reflex in vertebrate animals characterized by a long inspiratory phase with gradual mouth gaping, followed by a brief climax (or acme) with muscle stretching, and a rapid expiratory phase with muscle relaxation, which typically lasts a few seconds. For fish and birds, this is described as gradual mouth gaping, staying open for at least three seconds and subsequently a rapid closure of the mouth. Almost all vertebrate animals, including mammals, birds, reptiles, amphibians, and even fish, experience yawning. The study of yawning is called chasmology.

Yawning (oscitation) most often occurs in adults immediately before and after sleep, during tedious activities and as a result of its contagious quality. It is commonly associated with tiredness, stress, sleepiness, boredom, or even hunger. In humans, yawning is often triggered by the perception that others are yawning (for example, seeing a person yawning, or talking to someone on the phone who is yawning). This is a typical example of echopraxia and positive feedback. This "contagious" yawning has also been observed in chimpanzees, dogs, cats, birds, and reptiles and can occur between members of different species. Approximately twenty psychological reasons for yawning have been proposed by scholars, but there is little agreement on the primacy of any one.

During a yawn, muscles around the airway are fully stretched, including chewing and swallowing muscles. Due to these strong repositioning muscle movements, the airway (lungs and throat) dilates to three or four times its original size. The tensor tympani muscle in the middle ear contracts, which creates a rumbling noise perceived as coming from within the head; however, the noise is due to mechanical disturbance of the hearing apparatus and is not generated by the motion of air. Yawning is sometimes accompanied, in humans and other animals, by an instinctive act of stretching several parts of the body including the arms, neck, shoulders and back.

== Etymology ==
The English yawn continues a number of Middle English forms: yanen from Old English ġānian, and yenen, yonen from Old English frequentatives ġinian, ġionian, from a Germanic root *gīn-. The Germanic root has Proto-Indo-European cognates, from a root *g̑hēi- found also with -n- suffix in Greek χαίνω ('to yawn'), and without the -n- in English gap (compare the figura etymologica in Norse ginnunga-gap), gum ('palate') and gasp (via Old Norse), Latin hiō, hiatus, and Greek chasm, chaos.

The Latin term used in medicine is oscitatio (anglicized as oscitation), from the verb oscito ('to open the mouth'). Pandiculation is the act of yawning and stretching simultaneously.

== Proposed causes ==
Video of a yawning fetus at 30 weeks of pregnancy

There are a number of theories that attempt to explain why humans and other animals yawn.

One study states that yawning occurs when one's blood contains increased amounts of carbon dioxide and therefore becomes in need of the influx of oxygen (or expulsion of carbon dioxide) that a yawn can provide. Yawning may reduce oxygen intake compared to normal respiration; however, the frequency of yawning is not decreased by providing more oxygen or reducing carbon dioxide in the air.

Animals subject to predation or other dangers must be ready to physically exert themselves at any given moment. At least one study suggests that yawning, especially psychological "contagious" yawning, may have developed as a way of keeping a group of animals alert. If an animal is drowsy or bored, it will be less alert than when fully awake and less prepared to spring into action. "Contagious" yawning could be an instinctual signal between group members to stay alert.

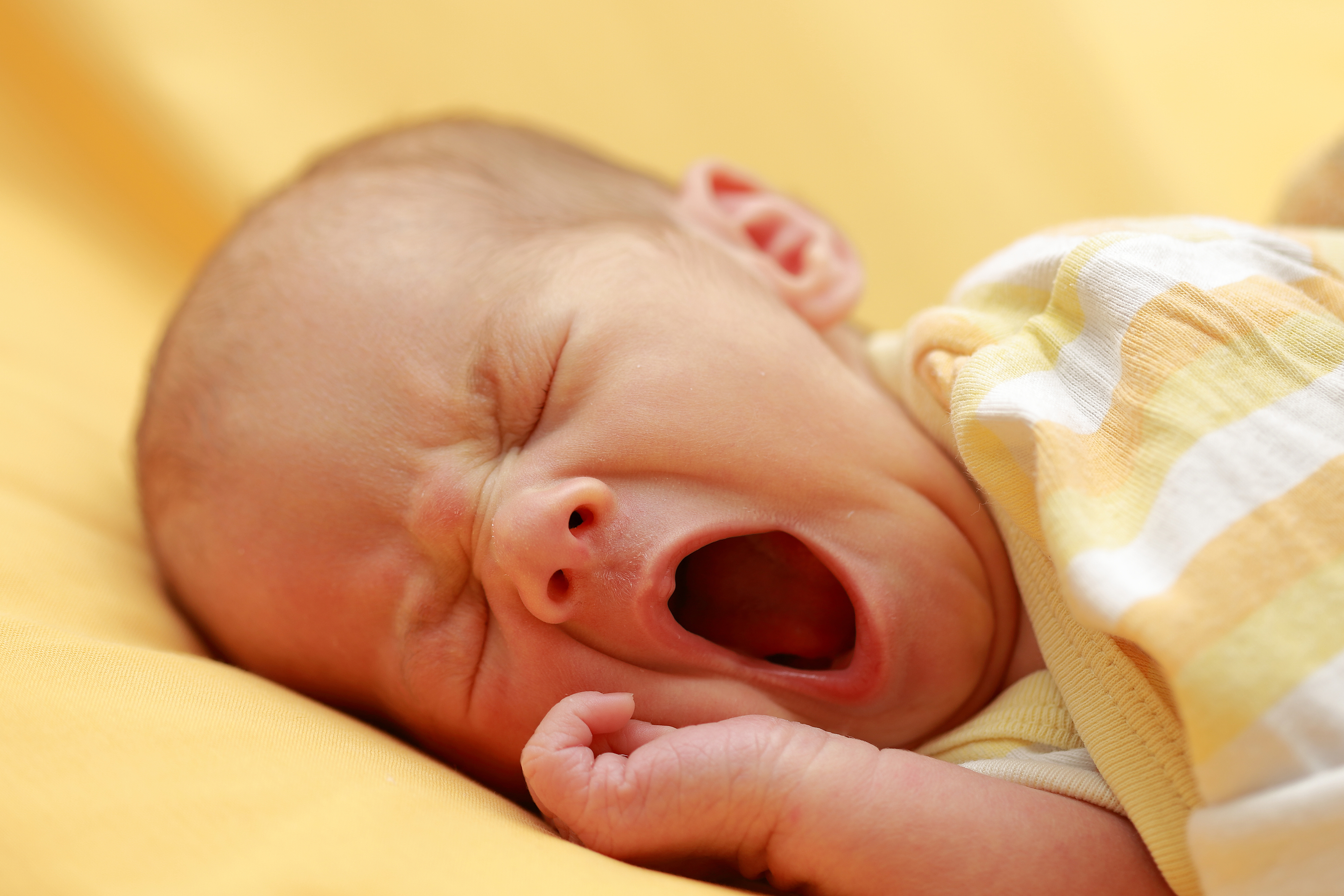
Research data strongly suggest that neither contagious nor story-induced yawning is reliable in children below the age of six years.

Nervousness, which often indicates the perception of an impending need for action, has also been suggested as a cause. Anecdotal evidence suggests that yawning helps increase a person's alertness. Paratroopers have been noted to yawn during the moments before they exit their aircraft.

Another notion states that yawning is the body's way of controlling brain temperature. In 2007, researchers, including a professor of psychology from the SUNY Albany (US), proposed yawning may be a means to keep the brain cool. Mammalian brains operate best within a narrow temperature range. In two experiments, subjects with cold packs attached to their foreheads and subjects asked to breathe strictly nasally exhibited reduced contagious yawning when watching videos of people yawning. A similar hypothesis suggests yawning is used for regulation of body temperature. Similarly, Guttmann and Dopart (2011) found that when a subject wearing earplugs yawns, the air moving between the subject's ear and the environment causes a breeze to be heard. Guttmann and Dopart determined that a yawn causes one of three possible situations to occur: the brain cools down due to an influx or outflux of oxygen; pressure in the brain is reduced by an outflux of oxygen; or the pressure of the brain is increased by an influx of air caused by increased cranial space.

One review hypothesized that yawning's goal is to periodically stretch the muscles of the throat, which may be important for efficient vocalization, swallowing, chewing, and also keeping the airway wide.

Yawning behavior may be altered as a result of medical issues such as diabetes, stroke, or adrenal conditions. Excessive yawning is seen in immunosuppressed patients such as those with multiple sclerosis. A professor of clinical and forensic neuropsychology at Bournemouth University has demonstrated that cortisol levels rise during yawning.

== Social function ==
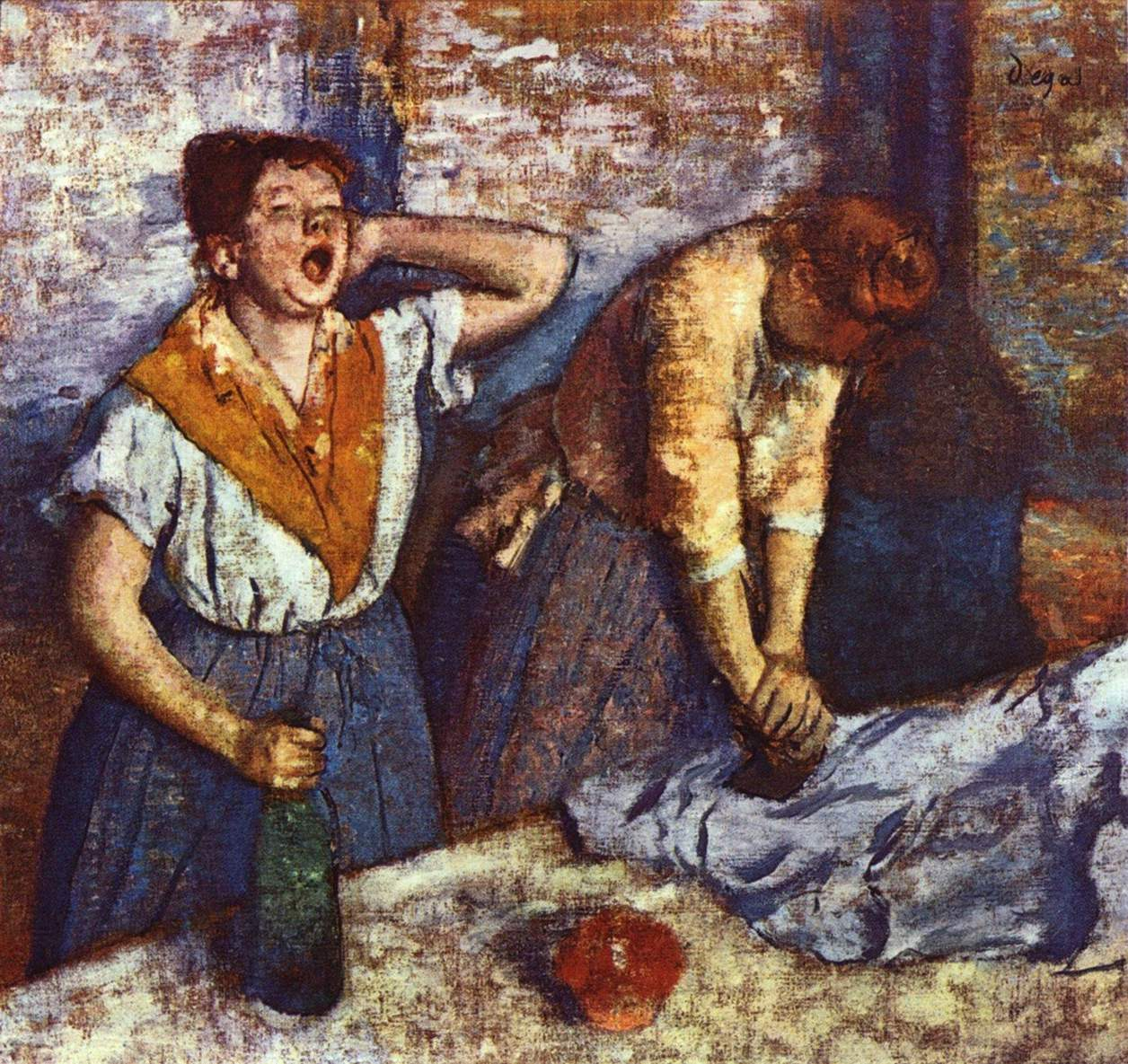
Two women ironing, one with a yawn, by Edgar Degas

With respect to a possible evolutionary advantage, yawning might be a herd instinct. Theories suggest that the yawn serves to synchronize mood in gregarious animals, similar to howling in a wolf pack. It signals fatigue among members of a group in order to synchronize sleeping patterns and periods.

Research by Garrett Norris (2013) involving monitoring the behaviour of students kept waiting in a reception area indicates a connection (supported by neuro-imaging research) between empathic ability and yawning. "We believe that contagious yawning indicates empathy. It indicates an appreciation of other peoples' behavioral and physiological state," says Norris.

The yawn reflex has long been observed to be contagious. In 1508, Erasmus wrote, "One man's yawning makes another yawn", and the French proverbialized the idea to "Un bon bâilleur en fait bâiller sept" ('One good gaper makes seven others gape'). Often, if one person yawns, this may cause another person to "empathetically" yawn. Observing another person's yawning face (especially their eyes), reading or thinking about yawning, or looking at a yawning picture can cause a person to yawn. The proximate cause for contagious yawning may lie with mirror neurons in the frontal cortex of certain vertebrates, which, upon being exposed to a stimulus from conspecific (same species) and occasionally interspecific organisms, activates the same regions in the brain. Mirror neurons have been proposed as a driving force for imitation, which lies at the root of much human learning, such as language acquisition. Yawning may be an offshoot of the same imitative impulse.

A 2007 study found that young children with autism spectrum disorders do not increase their yawning frequency after seeing videos of other people yawning, in contrast to non-autistic children. In fact, the autistic children actually yawned less during the videos of yawning than during the control videos.

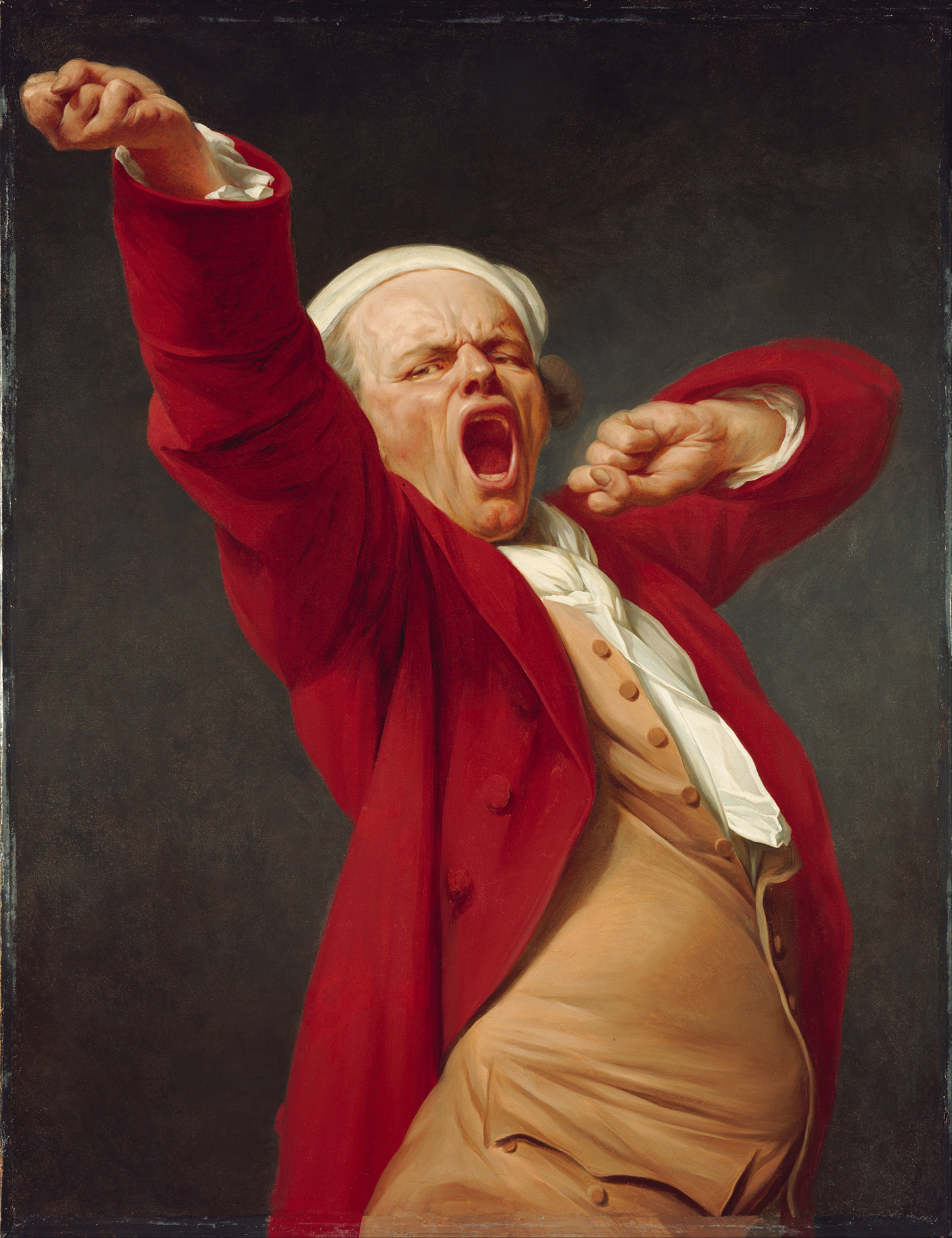
Joseph Ducreux pandiculating (both yawning and stretching); self-portrait c. 1783

The relationship between yawn contagion and empathy is strongly supported by a 2011 behavioural study, conducted by Ivan Norscia and Elisabetta Palagi (University of Pisa, Italy). The study revealed that—among other variables such as nationality, gender, and sensory modality—only social bonding predicted the occurrence, frequency, and latency of yawn contagion. As with other measures of empathy, the rate of contagion was found to be greatest in response to kin, then friends, then acquaintances, and lastly strangers. Related individuals (r≥0.25) showed the greatest contagion, in terms of both occurrence of yawning and frequency of yawns. Strangers and acquaintances showed a longer delay in the yawn response (latency) compared to friends and kin. Hence, yawn contagion appears to be primarily driven by the emotional closeness between individuals. The social asymmetry in contagious yawning (with contagious yawning being more frequent between familiar subjects than between strangers) remains when only yawns that are heard, but not seen, are considered. This finding makes it unlikely that visual attentional biases are at the basis of the social asymmetry observed in contagious yawning.

Two classes of yawning have been observed among primates. In some cases, the yawn is used as a threat gesture as a way of maintaining order in the primates' social structure. Specific studies were conducted on chimpanzees and stumptail macaques. A group of these animals was shown a video of other members of their own species yawning; both species yawned as well. This helps to partly confirm a yawn's "contagiousness".

The Discovery Channel's show MythBusters also tested this concept. In their small-scale, informal study they concluded that yawning is contagious.

Gordon Gallup, who hypothesizes that yawning may be a means of keeping the brain cool, also hypothesizes that "contagious" yawning may be a survival instinct inherited from our evolutionary past. "During human evolutionary history, when we were subject to predation and attacks by other groups, if everybody yawns in response to seeing someone yawn the whole group becomes much more vigilant and much better at being able to detect danger."

A study by the University of London has suggested that the "contagiousness" of yawns by a human will pass to dogs. The study observed that 21 of 29 dogs yawned when a stranger yawned in front of them but did not yawn when the stranger only opened his mouth. Helt and Eigsti (2010) showed that dogs, like humans, develop a susceptibility to contagious yawning gradually, and that while dogs above seven months 'catch' yawns from humans, younger dogs are immune to contagion. The study also indicated that nearly half of the dogs responded to the human's yawn by becoming relaxed and sleepy, suggesting that the dogs copied not just the yawn, but also the physical state that yawns typically reflect.

=== Relation to empathy ===
In a study involving gelada baboons, yawning was contagious between individuals, especially those that were socially close. This suggests that emotional proximity rather than spatial proximity is an indicator of yawn contagion.

Evidence for the occurrence of contagious yawning linked to empathy is rare outside of primates. It has been studied in Canidae species, such as the domestic dog and wolf. Domestic dogs have shown the ability to yawn contagiously in response to human yawns. Domestic dogs have demonstrated they are skilled at reading human communication behaviours. This ability makes it difficult to ascertain whether yawn contagion among domestic dogs is deeply rooted in their evolutionary history or is a result of domestication. In a 2014 study, wolves were observed in an effort to answer this question. The results of the study showed that wolves are capable of yawn contagion. This study also found that the social bond strength between individuals affected the frequency of contagious yawning in wolves, supporting previous research which ties contagious yawning to emotional proximity.

Some evidence for contagious yawning has also been found in budgerigars (Melopsittacus undulatus), a species of social parrots. This indicates that contagious yawning may have evolved several times in different lineages. In budgerigars, contagious yawning does not seem to be related to social closeness.

In certain neurological and psychiatric disorders, such as schizophrenia and autism, the patient has an impaired ability to infer the mental states of others. In such cases, yawn contagion can be used to evaluate their ability to infer or empathize with others. Autism spectrum disorder (ASD) is a developmental disorder which severely affects social and communicative development, including empathy. The results of various studies have shown a diminished susceptibility to contagious yawn, compared to the control group of typically developing children. Since atypical development of empathy is reported in autism spectrum disorder, results support the claim that contagious yawning and the capacity of empathy share common neural and cognitive mechanisms. Similarly, patients with neurological and psychiatric conditions, such as schizophrenia, have shown an impaired ability to empathize with others. Contagious yawning is one means of evaluating such disorders. The Canadian psychiatrist Heinz Lehmann claimed that increases in yawning could predict recovery in schizophrenia. The impairment of contagious yawning can provide greater insight into its connection to the underlying causes of empathy.

There is still substantial disagreement in the existing literature about whether or not yawn contagion is related to empathy at all. Empathy is a notoriously difficult trait to measure, and the literature on the subject is confused, with the same species sometimes displaying a connection between contagious yawning and social closeness, and sometimes apparently not. Different experimenters typically use slightly different measures of empathy, making comparisons between studies difficult, and there may be a publication bias, where studies which find a significant correlation between the two tested variables are more likely to be published than studies which do not. By revising in critical way the literature for and against yawn contagion as an empathy-related phenomenon, a 2020 review has shown that the social and emotional relevance of the stimulus (based on who the yawner is) can be related to the levels of yawn contagion, as suggested by neurobiological, ethological and psychological findings. Therefore, the discussion over the issue remains open.

== Non-human ==
Seeing a dog & horse & man yawn, makes me
feel how much all animals are built on one structure.

— Charles Darwin, Notebook M (1838), 65

Mammals, birds, and other vertebrates yawn.

In animals, yawning can serve as a warning signal. Charles Darwin's book, The Expression of the Emotions in Man and Animals, mentions that baboons yawn to threaten their enemies, possibly by displaying large canine teeth. Similarly, Siamese fighting fish yawn only when they see a conspecific (same species) or their own mirror-image, and their yawn often accompanies aggressive attack. Guinea pigs also yawn in a display of dominance or anger, displaying their impressive incisor teeth. This is often accompanied by teeth chattering, purring and scent marking.

Adelie penguins employ yawning as part of their courtship ritual. Penguin couples face off and the males engage in what is described as an "ecstatic display", opening their beaks and pointing their faces skyward. This trait has also been seen among emperor penguins. Researchers have been attempting to discover why these two different species share this trait, despite not sharing a habitat. Snakes yawn, both to realign their jaws after a meal and for respiratory reasons, as their trachea can be seen to expand when they do this. Dogs, and occasionally cats, often yawn after seeing people yawn and when they feel uncertain. Dogs demonstrate contagious yawning when exposed to human yawning. Dogs are very adept at reading human communication actions, so it is unclear if this phenomenon is rooted in evolutionary history or a result of domestication. Fish can also yawn, and they will increase this behavior when experiencing a lack of oxygen. Socially contagious yawning has been observed in budgerigars, and anecdotally when tired in other parrot species.

Black-backed jackal yawning

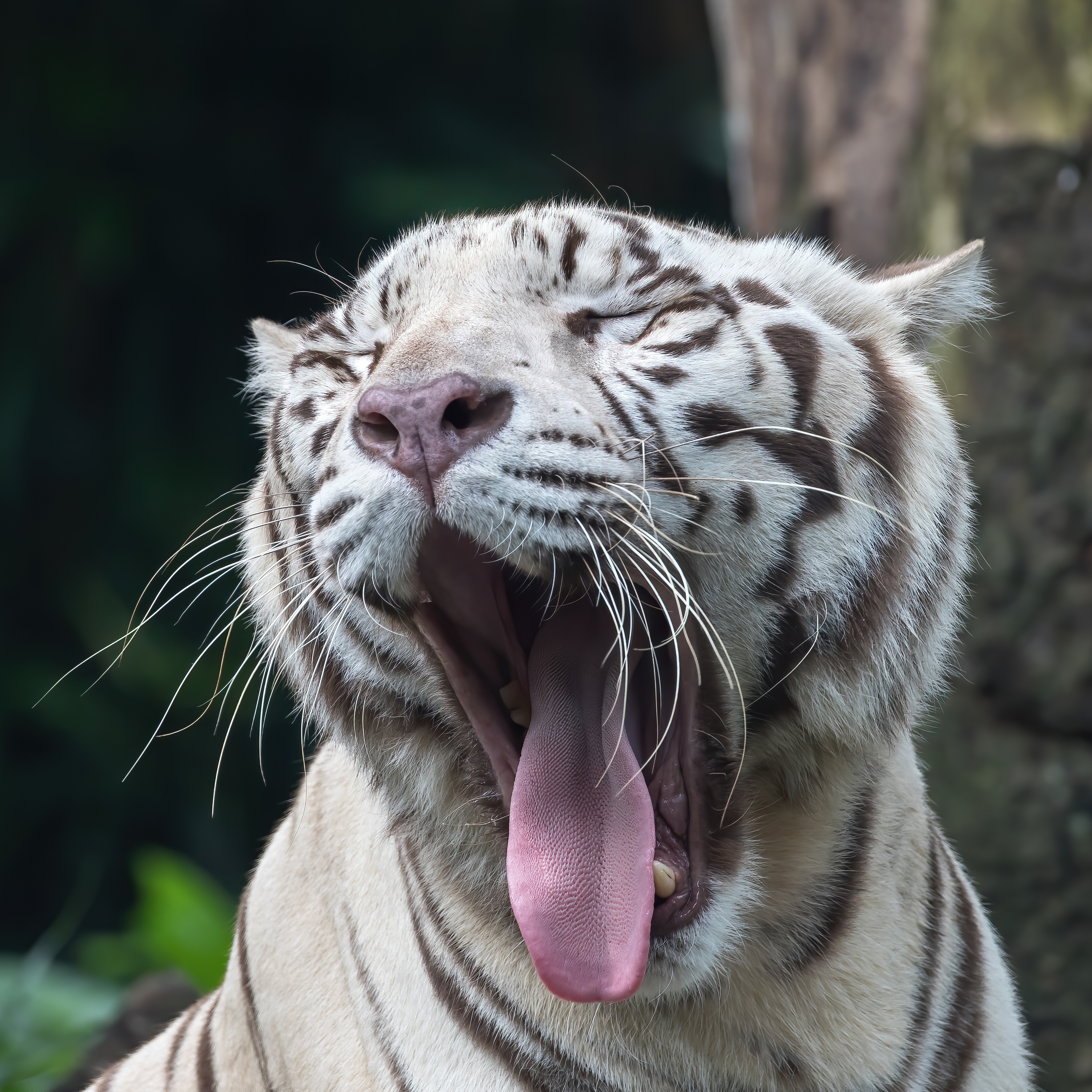
A white tiger yawning

A cougar yawning

== Culture ==
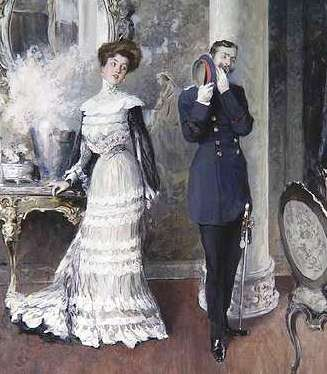
A soldier hides his yawn from his lady companion in this detail from a painting by Oscar Bluhm titled Ermüdende Konversation, or "Wearisome Conversation".

Some cultures lend yawning moral or spiritual significance. An open mouth has been associated with letting good immaterial things (such as the soul) escape or letting bad ones (evil spirits) enter, and yawning may have been thought to increase these risks. Covering the mouth when yawning may have been a way to prevent such transmission. Exorcists believe yawning can indicate that a demon or possessive spirit is leaving its human host during the course of an exorcism. Thus, covering one's mouth has been conceived as a protective measure against this.

Yawning has also been described as disrespectful (when done before others) or improper (when done alone). For example, in his commentary on Al-Bukhari's hadith collection, Ibn Hajar, an Islamic theologian, mentions that yawning, in addition to its risks of letting demons enter or take hold of one's body, is unbefitting for humans as it makes them look and sound like dogs by crooking men's upright posture and making them howl:

He [Prophet Muhammad] likened excessive yawning to the howling of dogs to deter people from it and to make it seem repulsive, for when a dog howls, it raises its head and opens its mouth widely, and the yawner resembles it when he yawns too much. This is why the Devil laughs at those who yawn, for he succeeds in playing with them and deforming them.

Superstitions regarding the act of yawning may have arisen from concerns over public health. Polydore Vergil (c. 1470–1555), in his De Rerum Inventoribus, writes that it was customary to make the Sign of the Cross over one's mouth, since "alike deadly plague was sometime in yawning, wherefore men used to fence themselves with the sign of the cross ... which custom we retain at this day."

Yawning is often perceived as implying boredom, and yawning conspicuously in another's presence has historically been a faux pas. In 1663, Francis Hawkins advised, "In yawning howl not, and thou shouldst abstain as much as thou can to yawn, especially when thou speakest." George Washington said, "If You Cough, Sneeze, Sigh, or Yawn, do it not Loud but Privately; and Speak not in your Yawning, but put Your handkerchief or Hand before your face and turn aside." These customary beliefs persist in the modern age. One of Mason Cooley's aphorisms is "A yawn is more disconcerting than a contradiction." A loud yawn may even lead to penalties for contempt of court.
