= Alfred Gross =

Alfred Gross may refer to:

- Alfred Otto Gross (1883–1970), ornithologist and professor of biology
- Alfred Groß (1893–1949), German district leader and mayor of Erlangen
- Al Gross (American football) (born 1961), American football player
- Al Gross (engineer) (1918–2000), or Alfred J. Gross, pioneer in mobile wireless communication

== See also ==
- Al Gross (disambiguation)
