= KJSL =

KJSL may refer to:

- KJSL-LP, a defunct low-power radio station (106.7 FM) formerly licensed to serve Fort Smith, Arkansas, United States
- KYFI, a radio station (630 AM) licensed to serve St. Louis, Missouri, United States, which held the call sign KJSL from 1994 to 2013
