= Alan Gross (disambiguation) =

Alan Gross (born 1949) is a former United States government contractor.

Alan Gross may also refer to:

- Al Gross (politician) (born 1962), American physician and politician from Alaska
- Alan G. Gross (1936–2020), American academic
- Alan Gross (New Hampshire politician), American politician

== See also ==
- Al Gross (disambiguation)
- Alan Grossman, American microbiologist
