= Benjamin E. Powell =

American librarian

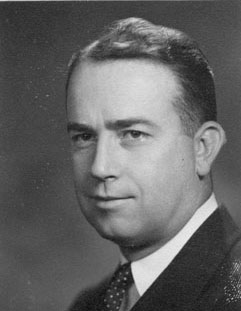
- Powell in 1946

President of the American Library Association
- In office 1959–1960
- Preceded by: Emerson Greenaway
- Succeeded by: Frances Lander Spain

Personal details
- Born: August 28, 1905 Sunbury, North Carolina, US
- Died: March 11, 1981 (aged 75)
- Education: Trinity College; Columbia University; University of Chicago
- Occupation: Librarian

Benjamin Edward Powell (August 28, 1905 – March 11, 1981) was an American librarian and president of the American Library Association from 1959 to 1960.

== Early life and education ==
Powell was born in Sunbury, North Carolina to Willis Warren and Beatrice Franklin Powell. He attended Trinity College, graduating in 1926. After graduation, he accepted a position at the Duke University library. He took a leave of absence from 1929 to 1930 to attend the Columbia University School of Library Service to pursue a degree in library science.

Powell continued his education from 1934 to 1935 and in 1937 he was appointed head librarian at the University of Missouri. He received his doctorate in library science from the University of Chicago Graduate Library School in 1946.

== Career ==
Powell became university librarian at Duke University in 1946 after Joseph Penn Breedlove's 48-year tenure and served in that role until he retired in 1975. At Duke, he oversaw an expansion of the university library and the integration of the University Archives.

He was also president of the Association of College and Research Libraries (1948–1949). He was acting chairman of the Southeastern Library Association in 1951- 1952, a member of the advisory committee of the Association of Research Libraries from 1950 to 1955, and a member of the executive board of the North Carolina Library Association.

== Publications ==
- Powell, Benjamin E. (1948). "The Second Decade". College & Research Libraries. 9 (4): 295.
- Powell, Benjamin E. (November 1956). "Southern University Libraries during the Civil War". Wilson Library Bulletin. 31: 250–254, 259.
- "The University Libraries, Duke University" (1959)
- Powell, Benjamin Edward. 1963. "New Depository Library Legislation." ALA Bulletin 57 (January): 36–39.
- Orne, Jerrold; Powell, B. E. (October 1966). "The Libraries of the University of North Carolina and of Duke University". Library Trends. 15: 222–247.
- Powell, Benjamin E. (Fall 1967). "Growth of an Academic Library". North Carolina Libraries. 25 (4): 102–106.
- Powell, Benjamin E. (December 1, 1969). "Redoubled Gothic for Duke". Library Journal. 94: 4397–4398.
- Powell, Benjamin E. (Winter 1975). "Collection Development in Southeastern Libraries since 1948". Southeastern Librarian. 24: 59–67.

Non-profit organization positions
Preceded by Emerson Greenaway	President of the American Library Association; 1959–1960	Succeeded by Frances Lander Spain
