= Lucile M. Morsch =

American librarian (1906–1972)

President of the American Library Association
- In office 1957–1958
- Preceded by: Ralph R. Shaw
- Succeeded by: Emerson Greenaway

Personal details
- Born: January 21, 1906 Sioux City, Iowa, US
- Died: July 3, 1972 (aged 66) Washington, D.C., US
- Education: Columbia University
- Occupation: Librarian

Lucile M. Morsch (January 21, 1906 – July 3, 1972) was an American librarian who served as president of the American Library Association from 1957 to 1958. Morsch also worked as the Deputy Chief Assistant Librarian of Congress from 1953 to 1962.

== Education and career in libraries ==
Morsch began her career as a cataloger in the library of the University of Iowa as a student, where she received a Bachelor of Arts degree. She went on to receive B.S. and M.S. degrees in Library Science from the Columbia University School of Library Service, in 1929 and 1930 respectively, serving two years as the Lydia Roberts Fellow. She returned to work at the University of Iowa for five years before taking a position as chief classifier at the Enoch Pratt Free Library.

Morsch joined the Library of Congress in 1940, becoming the first chief of the new Descriptive Cataloging Division in 1940. She served as chief of the Descriptive Cataloging Division from 1940 to 1950 and again from 1962 to 1965. In that role she was heavily involved in the development of standardized cataloging rules and cataloging code revision; she completed the first thorough revision of the Library's descriptive cataloging rules in 1949.

From 1953 to 1962, Morsch served as Deputy Chief Assistant Librarian of Congress from 1953 to 1962. In this role she was primarily concerned with the Library of Congress's relationships with other libraries and with scholarly and cultural institutions in the United States and abroad. She retired from the Library of Congress in 1965 after twenty-five years of service there.

== Leadership and recognition ==
Morsch was the first recipient of the Margaret Mann Citation from the American Library Association in 1951 for her leadership in creating the Rules for Descriptive Cataloging in the Library of Congress, which clarified and simplified cataloging rules for libraries.

She served as president of the District of Columbia Library Association from 1954 to 1955.

Her inaugural speech as president of the American Library Association on June 25, 1957 was titled "Promoting library interests throughout the world," emphasizing the importance of international relations. That speech was regarded by at least one critic as anti-Communist in tone.

Morsch served on a Civil Liberties Committee in 1960 to examine statements from the American Library Association regarding racial segregation in libraries and to formulate an official policy statement. The Committee's policy statement took the form of an addition to ALA's Library Bill of Rights, asserting that the "rights of an individual to the use of a library should not be denied or abridged because of his race, religion, national origin or political views"; this statement was adopted by the organization in 1961 in a near-unanimous vote.

In 1966 Morsch was awarded the Melvil Dewey Medal by the American Library Association, which recognizes "creative leadership of high order" in librarianship.

== Personal life and death ==
Morsch married Werner B. Ellinger in 1944. She had a small collection of postcards depicting libraries that had been mailed to her by colleagues; she donated her collection to librarian collector Norman Stevens before her death. Morsch was found dead in her apartment in Washington, DC on July 3, 1972, after losing her husband just a few weeks earlier.

== Bibliography ==
- Rules for Descriptive Cataloging in the Library of Congress, (Library of Congress, 1949)
- Promoting Library Interests throughout the World, Bulletin of the American Library Association, Vol. 51, No. 8 (September 1957), pp. 579–584

== See also ==
- Library of Congress

Non-profit organization positions
| Preceded by Ralph R. Shaw | President of the American Library Association; 1957–1958 | Succeeded by Emerson Greenaway |
