= Florrinell F. Morton =

American librarian and educator

Florinnell F. Morton

President of the American Library Association
- In office 1961–1962
- Preceded by: Frances Lander Spain
- Succeeded by: James E. Bryan

Personal details
- Born: Florinnell Francis; December 20, 1904
- Died: January 4, 1990 (aged 85) Baton Rouge, Louisiana, US
- Spouse: Charles Hester Morton
- Occupation: Librarian

Florinnell Francis Morton (December 20, 1904 – January 4, 1990) was an American librarian, educator, and president of the American Library Association from 1961 to 1962.

Morton was on staff of the Library at the University of North Texas.

She then served as Director of the Library School at Louisiana State University from 1944 to 1971. She was president of the Association of American Library Schools in 1946-47.

Morton was honored with the Essae Martha Culver Award by the Louisiana Library Association in 1966.

Morton was an official participant and recognized expert at the Conference on Library Education in the South (held April 20–22, 1967, at Atlanta University.

She was married to Charles Hester Morton.

== Publications ==
- "Ideals in the preparation of librarians: Standards for accreditation" (Kansas State Teachers College, 1961)
- "Career Guidance: A Key to Recruiting" ALA Bulletin, v52 n8 (September 1958), p. 578

Non-profit organization positions
Preceded by Frances Lander Spain	President of the American Library Association; 1961–1962	Succeeded by James E. Bryan
