= Robert G. Vosper =

American educator and librarian

- Vosper in 1960

President of the American Library Association
- In office 1965–1966
- Preceded by: Edwin Castagna
- Succeeded by: Mary V. Gaver

Personal details
- Born: Robert Gordon Vosper; June 21, 1913 Portland, Oregon, US
- Died: May 14, 1994 (aged 80) Los Angeles, California, US
- Spouse: Loraine Gjording (m. 1940)
- Education: University of Oregon; University of California at Berkeley
- Occupation: Librarian

Robert Gordon Vosper (June 21, 1913 – May 14, 1994) was an American educator and librarian who oversaw college libraries at the University of Kansas and the University of California, Los Angeles. Vosper served as president of the American Library Association (ALA) and won the Joseph W. Lippincott Award in 1985. He was also named one of the top 100 librarians of the 20th century by American Libraries. He was awarded American Library Association Honorary Membership in 1993.

== Early years ==
Vosper was born in Portland, Oregon, to parents Chester Vivian and Anna Stipe on June 6, 1913. Vosper received his Bachelor of Arts and master's degrees in the field of Classics from the University of Oregon in 1937 and 1939, respectively. He then went on to pursue a degree in librarianship at the University of California at Berkeley in 1940. On August 20, 1940, he married Loraine Gjording. The couple had one son and three daughters.

Vosper's career as a librarian included directorships at the W.A. Clark Memorial Library and the library at the University of Kansas, as well as the director of libraries at the University of California, Los Angeles (UCLA) where he began in 1961. In 1973, Vosper retired from his work at the library but continued to teach as a full-time professor at UCLA's school of library science until 1983, followed by several years as a recall professor.

== Contributions to the library profession ==
Vosper is well known for his writings on the field of librarianship where his topics included the importance of building a strong book collection that included varied topics and other general aspects of library planning. His work Acquisition Trends in American Libraries, written in 1955, stressed that book acquisitions and collection development were important aspects of any library and should not be overlooked in favor of a deepened concentration on other traditional occupational tasks such as cataloging and reference. Vosper felt that it was important to step away from the purely mechanical aspects of acquisitions in favor of using individuals interested in the subject matter of the books in question. This was a directive that Vosper practiced in both his professional career as a library director and as a professor in the field.

Another aspect of librarianship that Vosper worked to improve was in the area of interactions between libraries on an international level. During the McCarthy era of the 1950s, Vosper became known both nationally and internationally as a member of the library profession willing to stand up for intellectual freedoms. Together with the Chancellor of the University of Kansas, Franklin D. Murphy, Vosper helped to create an internationally known exhibit on intellectual freedom. The exhibit's catalog became so well known and popular that 20,000 copies had to be printed.

In 1964, Vosper wrote for the professional journal Library Trends on the status and developments of European university libraries. He examined aspects of the American library system that he felt were lacking, such as deficiencies in the history of American libraries. Despite some of the international efforts being made at the time to improve international ties, Vosper felt that the profession was doing its patrons a disservice by not providing users with multilingual sources. He also felt that American users would benefit from understanding how libraries in Europe functioned, especially comparing the liberal access American users were accustomed to with the more controlled access available in several European nations.

== Professional appointments and awards ==
Vosper later became vice president of the International Federation of Library Associations and Institutions (IFLA) from 1971 to 1977, as well as a board member to the Board of the Council on Library Resources, an organization created to advance modern research and university libraries across the globe.

Vosper was well respected in his field, receiving many forms of recognition from his professional peers both nationally and internationally. From 1965 to 1966, Vosper served as president of the American Library Association and was awarded the Joseph W. Lippincott Award by the ALA in 1985. The Lippincott Award recognizes librarians distinguished by their service to the profession in the form of writings and participation in professional organizations, both areas in which Vosper was well accomplished.

In 1999, Vosper was recognized by American Libraries as one of the top 100 Librarians of the 20th Century for his work as a librarian at UCLA from 1961 to 1973. It was during his tenure at UCLA that Vosper further developed his reputation for standing firm on his beliefs on the true function of a library that he began during his employment at Kansas University. On May 6, 1970, Vosper was under pressure by UCLA's administration to close the library due to antiwar protests taking place on the campus. In response to these instructions, Vosper posted a notice declaring his refusal to shut the doors on the grounds that the purpose of a library was to be a sanctuary devoted to the free access of intellectual and cultural information. By choosing to keep the UCLA libraries open during such unrest, Vosper is still seen as a person committed to preserving the library and its most basic function, being a portal of information no matter the circumstances. Vosper's actions in this situation showcase the importance of upholding the ethical obligations librarians face every day.

Vosper's international accolades include becoming a decorated officer in the Order of the Crown of Belgium in 1977 and being named a Guggenheim fellow from 1959 to 1960.

== Later years ==
After leaving the directorship at the UCLA's library in 1973, he stayed on as a faculty member at the university's library school. On May 14, 1994, at the age of 80, Robert G. Vosper died at his home in Los Angeles, California.

Non-profit organization positions
Preceded by Edwin Castagna	President of the American Library Association; 1965–1966	Succeeded by Mary V. Gaver
