= KYFI =

Bible Broadcasting Network radio station in St. Louis

- St. Louis, Missouri; United States
- Broadcast area: Greater St. Louis
- Frequency: 630 kHz

Programming
- Format: Conservative Christian radio
- Affiliations: Bible Broadcasting Network

Ownership
- Owner: Bible Broadcasting Network, Inc.

History
- First air date: September 19, 1938
- Former call signs: KXOK (1938–1994); KJSL (1994–2013)
- Former frequencies: 1250 kHz (1938–1940)
- Call sign meaning: "You Find Inspiration"

Technical information
- Licensing authority: FCC
- Facility ID: 73299
- Class: B
- Power: 5,000 watts
- Transmitter coordinates: 38°40′18″N 90°06′52″W

Links
- Public license information: Public file; LMS
- Website: BBNRadio.org

KYFI (630 AM) is a Conservative Christian radio station broadcasting from St. Louis, Missouri. KYFI is owned and operated by Bible Broadcasting Network, Inc. KYFI's transmitters are located near Gateway Motorsports Park in Madison, Illinois.

The 630 frequency had previously been KXOK, which in the 1960s was one of the leading radio stations in St. Louis, and religious station KJSL from 1994 to 2013.

== History ==
=== Construction of KXOK ===
In 1935, Elzey Roberts, publisher of the St. Louis Star-Times, applied for a license to put a new radio station on the air. He already owned station KFRU in Columbia, and wanted a station in the larger St. Louis market. But his license request was challenged by two other stations in the market, KSD and WIL; the legal battle dragged on until late 1937, when the court granted Roberts' request and the FCC assigned the KXOK call letters. WIL attempted to appeal the case to the Supreme Court of the United States, but in late March 1938, they lost when the court refused to review the case, affirming the FCC's grant; KXOK was given permission to begin building the new station. General manager Ray V. Hamilton announced the station would be dedicated in mid-August 1938, but there were further delays in building it.

KXOK finally made its debut on September 19, 1938. Allen Franklin was the first program director; he came from station WLW in Cincinnati. Among the air staff was Paul Aurandt, who came there from KOMA in Oklahoma City and would later become famous as Paul Harvey. KXOK began its life at 1250 kHz and was affiliated with the Mutual Broadcasting System; however, on October 26, 1940, it moved to 630 kHz and became affiliated with NBC Blue (later called the Blue Network). The KXOK shift to 630, which also saw the station move from Venice, Illinois to its site at Madison, also benefited Roberts's station in Columbia, which went full-time on 1270 kHz, and WGBF of Evansville, Indiana, which ceased sharing time with KFRU and went full-time on 1250. Elzey Robert continued to own the station until 1954, when his son, Elzey Roberts, Jr., and an associate, Chester L. Thomas, took it over, doing business as KXOK Broadcasting, Inc.

=== Change of ownership ===
In early November 1960, the station changed hands, when Roberts and Thomas sold the station to Robert and Todd Storz, for the sum of $1.5 million. The station changed format not long after to a new Top 40 sound. Nicknamed "The Sound and the Spirit of St. Louis" and "The Fun Spot," KXOK became part of the Storz family of stations (other stations in the group included WHB across the state in Kansas City, WQAM in Miami, WTIX in New Orleans, KOMA in Oklahoma City, and WDGY in Minneapolis-St. Paul). During the mid-60s, KXOK was one of the two dominant radio stations in the St. Louis market, along with KMOX. KXOK was so successful during this period, that its Top 40 competitor, WIL (AM 1430) dropped pop music in 1967, and switched to country music; it helped that WIL refused to play The Beatles.

=== Top 40 DJs ===
A number of legendary air personalities appeared on KXOK during the station's more successful years, including Ed Bonner, Ray Otis, Bill Addison, Mort Crowley, Danny Dark, Ron Elz aka Johnny Rabbitt, British DJ Paul Martin, Shad O'Shea, William A. Hopkins, Don Pietromonaco aka Johnny Rabbitt, Don Shafer, Delcia Devon, Louise Harrison Caldwell (George Harrison's sister), Lou Cooley, Davey O'Donnell, Peter Martin, Keith Morris, Richard Ward Fatherley and Bob Shannon.

Other outstanding personalities of the 1970s included Jerry Butler, Mason Lee Dixon, Jack Mindy, Craig Roberts and Scott Sherwood. The news staff included veteran reporters Bob Shea, Robert R. Lynn and Steven B. Stevens. It was under the leadership of Station Operations Manager Bud Connell and program directors Ray Otis and Mort Crowley that KXOK became one of the highest-rated stations in the country.

It was quite common for the DJs such as Rabbitt and Otis to travel to various teen venues with their specially selected escort bands to gage their audiences' interest in music and to make personal contact with their fans. The KXOK Sound Waves of Centralia, Illinois, were a fan favorite featuring members Ron Bousman, Mike Atchison, Greg Flanigan, Tommy Lee, and Joey Rhodes. Rhodes went on to become a Nashville recording artist and songwriter.

Many of the station's DJs over the years went on to successful careers as national talk show hosts, television news anchors, actors and nationally known freelance talent. Danny Dark became the voice of NBC-TV, a post he held for an entire generation. Craig Roberts continues to work as a national television voice actor and announcer, still heard locally in St. Louis as the "voice" of ABC 30.

=== Talk and news ===
With the departure of key air talents and the advent of Top 40 music on FM—most notably from KSLQ (now known as KYKY)—KXOK went through several format changes toward the end of the 1970s The music format ended in April 1983, when KXOK flipped to talk and oldies. After being sold along with KHTK to Legends Broadcasting for $6.5 million in 1989, KXOK went to an all-news format, calling itself "All News 630". KXOK started adding an audio simulcast of CNN Headline News in overnights in May 1990, replacing a syndicated sports/trivia show from Boston, with CNN audio replacing much of the locally produced daytime news blocks by September. The station also featured Sports Extra, a nightly local evening talk show hosted by Howard Balzer and Mark Eissman. When KXOK dropped the all-news format in favor of Motown-oriented soul music in February 1991, Sports Extra was retained due to listener demand, but also became known for frequent technical issues that plagued the program's production.

=== Religion as KJSL ===
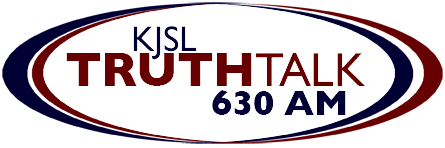
Former station logo

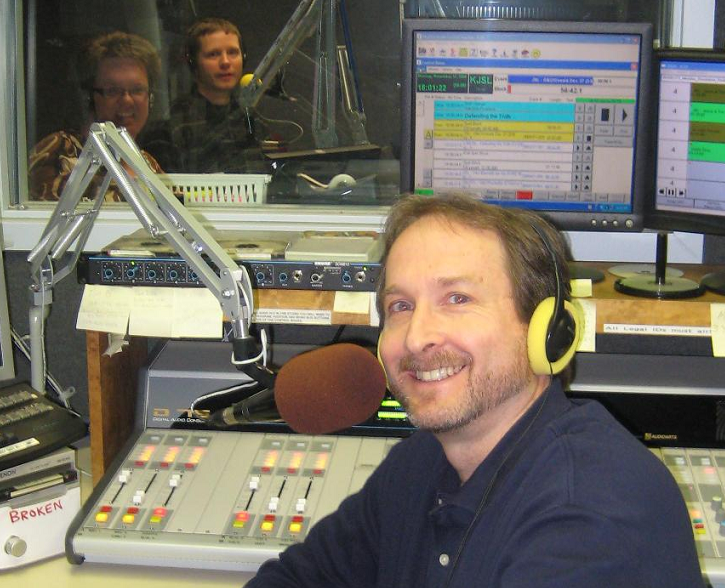
Bob Wells Show in the KJSL studio

KXOK was sold in 1994 to Crawford Broadcasting, which changed it to a religious station as KJSL; as part of the changeover, Crawford moved the station to new facilities in west St. Louis County. Under Crawford ownership, KJSL featured multiple locally originated programs, including a morning drive program hosted by Al Gross and Tim Berends; KJSL attempted to promote the show to non-Christian listeners with a 1998 billboard that read "Hell Hates Tim & Al", trimmed in flames. Motivational speaker Debra Peppers hosted a daily inspirational talk program from 1996 through 2006. Bob Wells hosted a conservative talk show, once attracting local attention for protesting Anheuser-Busch's local sponsorship of St. Louis PrideFest. Area broadcaster Hank Thompson also hosted an overnight show on KJSL in the early 2000s.

=== Sale to BBN ===
Crawford opted to spin off the stronger of its two St. Louis stations, KXOK, to the Bible Broadcasting Network in 2013. BBN paid $2 million and shuttered the station's local operations to carry the network feed from its headquarters in Charlotte, North Carolina.
