= Al Gross =

Al Gross may refer to:

- Al Gross (politician) (born 1962), Alaskan politician, orthopedic surgeon, commercial fisherman
- Al Gross (American football) (born 1961), American football player
- Al Gross (broadcaster), American broadcaster and voice actor
- Al Gross (engineer) (1918–2000), pioneer in mobile wireless communication

== See also ==
- Alan Gross (disambiguation)
