= Frederick H. Wagman =

American librarian

President of the American Library Association
- In office 1963–1964
- Preceded by: James E. Bryan
- Succeeded by: Edwin Castagna

Personal details
- Born: Frederick Herbert Wagman; October 12, 1912 Springfield, Massachusetts, US
- Died: May 22, 1994 (aged 81) Ann Arbor, Michigan, US
- Education: Amherst College; Columbia University
- Occupation: Librarian

Frederick Herbert Wagman (October 12, 1912 – November 30, 1994) was an American librarian and president of the American Library Association from 1963 to 1964.

Wagman was born in Springfield, Massachusetts. He graduated from Amherst College in 1933 before attending Columbia University where he earned both master's and a doctorate degree in 1934 and 1942 respectively. While studying for his doctorate, he taught at the University of Minnesota.

In 1945, Wagman joined the Library of Congress as acting director of Personnel and of Administrative Services. He served in several roles at the Library of Congress.

He was Director of the University of Michigan Library and a professor of Library Science in 1953. He was president of the Michigan Library Association in 1959-1960. He was honored as Michigan Librarian of the Year in 1970.

He retired from the university in 1982.

Wagman also served on the President's Commission on Obscenity and Pornography, a Commission that the United States Congress funded and was set up by President Lyndon B. Johnson to study pornography in 1969.

== Publications ==
- Fussler, Herman H.; Wagman, Frederick H. (October 1965). "The General Research Library and the Area-Studies Programs [with Discussion]". The Library Quarterly. 35 (4): 343–360. doi:10.1086/619362.
- Wagman, Frederick H. (January 1961). "Library Requirements of the Modern College". The Library Quarterly. 31 (1): 33–44. doi:10.1086/618842.
- Wagman, Frederick H. (May 1959). "The Undergraduate Library of the University of Michigan". College & Research Libraries. 20 (3): 179–188.
- Lundy, Frank A.; Dix, William S.; Wagman, Frederick H. (1956). "Library Service to Undergraduate College Students: The Divisional Plan Library; Undergraduates Do Not Necessarily Require a Special Facility; The Case for the Separate Undergraduate Library". College & Research Libraries. 17 (2): 143–155. doi:10.5860/crl_17_02_143. hdl:2142/36864.
- Wagman, Frederick Herbert (1942). Magic and Natural Science in German Baroque Literature: A Study in the Prose Forms of the Later Seventeenth Century. New York: Columbia University Press.
- Wagman, Frederick Herbert (1933). Goethe’s Conception of Personality. Philadelphia: Carl Schurz Memorial Foundation.

Non-profit organization positions
Preceded by James E. Bryan	President of the American Library Association; 1963–1964	Succeeded by Edwin Castagna
