= James E. Bryan =

American librarian (1909–2007)

President of the American Library Association
- In office 1962–1963
- Preceded by: Florrinell F. Morton
- Succeeded by: Frederick H. Wagman

Personal details
- Born: James Edward Bryan III; July 11, 1909 Easton, Pennsylvania, U.S.
- Died: May 10, 2007 (aged 97) Hancock, New Hampshire, U.S.
- Education: Lafayette College; Drexel University; American University
- Occupation: Librarian

James Edward "Ned" Bryan III (July 11, 1909 – May 10, 2007) was an American librarian, and president of the American Library Association from 1962 to 1963. Bryan was born in Easton, Pennsylvania, to William W. and Florence Shimer Bryan. He received degrees from Lafayette College, Drexel University and American University.

He began his career at the District of Columbia Public Library and was later named Director of the Easton, Pennsylvania, public library. He then moved to Pittsburgh to manage a department in the Carnegie Library of Pittsburgh. Bryan then moved to Newark, New Jersey, to serve first as Assistant Director and in 1958 was named Director of the Newark Public Library. He retired from Newark at age 63 in 1972.

Bryan served as president of the Public Library Association in 1959 and the New Jersey Library Association from 1952 to 1954.

== Selected Publications ==
- Bryan, James E. (February 1949). "Remodeling of Library Buildings". ALA Bulletin. 43 (2): 77–81.
- Bryan, James E. (June 1961). "The Christmas Holiday Jam: Student Use of a Metropolitan Public Library". ALA Bulletin. 55 (6): 526–530.
- Bryan, James E. (July 1962). "Mutual Responsibility for Mutual Service". College & Research Libraries. 23 (4): 291–294.
- Bryan, James E. (July 1962). "Mutual Responsibility for Mutual Service". College & Research Libraries. 23 (4): 291–294.

Non-profit organization positions
Preceded by Florrinell F. Morton	President of the American Library Association; 1962–1963	Succeeded by Frederick H. Wagman
