= Frances Lander Spain =

American librarian

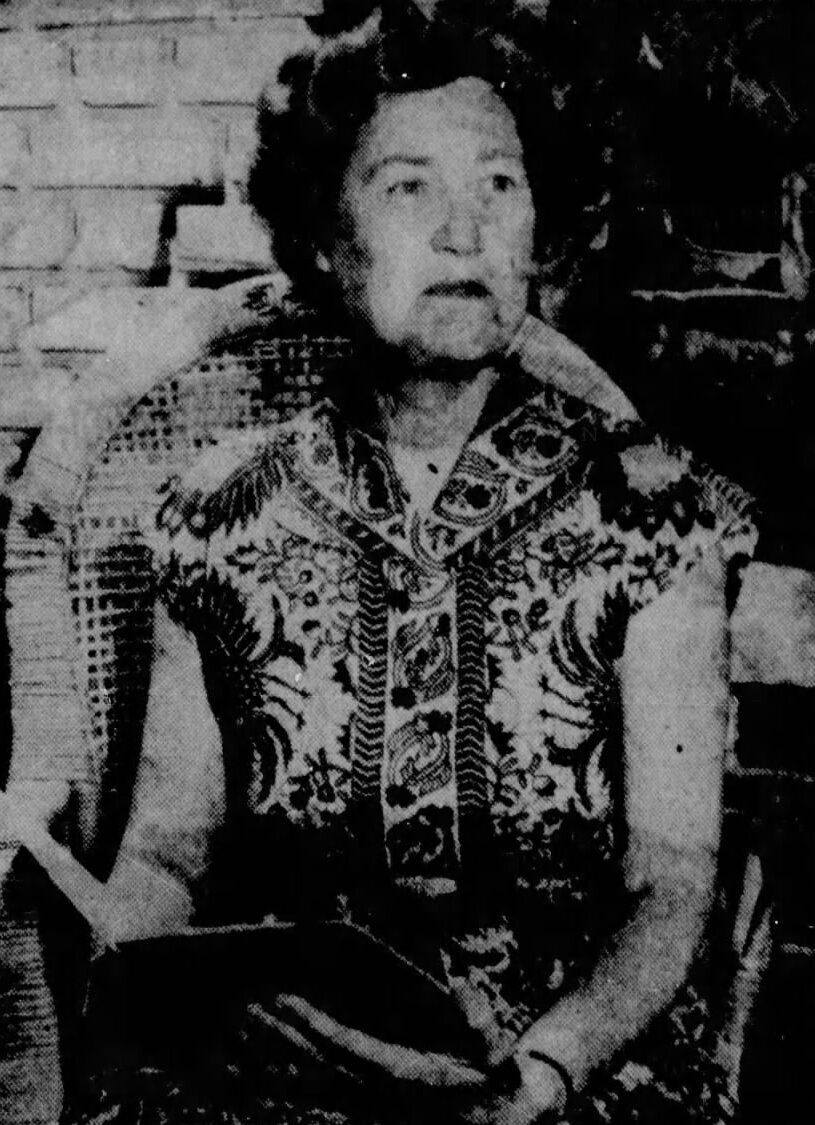
- Spain in 1957

President of the American Library Association
- In office 1960–1961
- Preceded by: Benjamin E. Powell
- Succeeded by: Florrinell F. Morton

Personal details
- Born: March 15, 1903 Jacksonville, Florida, US
- Died: January 20, 1999 (aged 95)
- Spouse: Donald Spain (m. 1926; died 1934)
- Education: Winthrop College; Emory University; University of Chicago
- Occupation: Children's Librarian
- Known for: First Children's Librarian to become ALA President

Frances Lander Spain (March 15, 1903 – January 20, 1999) was a children's librarian and an instructor of school library services. In 1960, she became the first children's librarian to ever hold the position of president of the American Library Association (ALA). Spain was named one of the library's "100 Most Important Leaders We Had in the 20th Century."

== Biography ==
Spain's grandfather, Samuel Lander, was a Methodist minister and founder of Lander University in Williamston, South Carolina. Her parents, Malcolm McPherson Lander and Rose Olivia Dantzler, met at Lander College while her mother was a student. Spain's father later became a railway postal worker in Jacksonville, Florida, and that is where he and Olivia started their family. Born Frances Lander, she was the oldest of three children, but both of her younger siblings died early in childhood. She held her first job as a page for the Jacksonville Public Library while still in high school. After graduating high school, Spain went to Winthrop College in South Carolina and graduated in 1925 with degree in physical education. The fall of that same year, she married a banker, Donald Spain. The couple had two children, Barbara and Don. Don died of pneumonia in 1932 at the age of 2 and her husband died of the same illness in 1934.

== Early career ==
After the death of her husband and son, Spain needed to provide for her daughter and so, went back to school. In 1935, Spain went to Emory University in Atlanta to work on a B.A. in library science. Upon graduation in 1936, she was offered a faculty position at Winthrop College in their new library science department. After receiving a scholarship in 1941, Spain to a break from teaching and went to the University of Chicago Graduate Library School to earn both her master's and doctorate in library science. Spain returned to Winthrop College as the librarian director in 1945 and between then and 1948, both instructed classes and worked her way up the South Carolina Library Association (SCLA). Spain started as the chair of the school library section of the SCLA and gradually moved up as vice-president and eventually became president in 1947. During her time in the SCLA, Spain revised the constitution to include not only public libraries, but also university, school, and special libraries. She also developed school library standards for the state of South Carolina. Spain left South Carolina in 1948, when she received an offer from the University of Southern California. She became the assistant director of the Library School and taught courses in children's literature.

== Chulalongkorn University ==
In 1951, Spain received a Fulbright grant and traveled to Chulalongkorn University in Thailand. Thailand had very little by way of organized libraries and while she was there, Spain helped create a one-year degree in library science at the university. Spain also tried to create a more formal library system in all of Thailand. She established various committees and groups that eventually organized to become the Thailand Library Association in 1954. Though she had to leave at the end of the grant in 1952, her work was continued by Margaret Rufsvold, Margaret Griffin, Mildred Lowell, and Lois Stockman. Spain later returned in 1964 to review and continue the progress her colleagues had made. It was during this time that a Master's program was created, expanding upon the flourishing Bachelor's program.

== New York Public Library ==
When Spain returned to the U.S. in 1952, she went back to the University of Southern California to continue teaching. One year after returning from Thailand, Spain was offered the Head of Children's Services at the New York Public Library (NYPL). During her eight years at NYPL, Spain followed in the tradition of her predecessors and became the editor of the "Books for Young People," an article in the Saturday Review Magazine. She also published two revered collections of work on children's services, "Reading Without Boundaries," and "The Contents of the Basket." The New York Public Library attributes their 50% circulation increase in children's books to Spain's dedication. It was during this time that Spain became the foremost authority on children's library services.

== American Library Association ==
In 1960, Spain became the first children's librarian to ever become president of the American Library Association (ALA). Most notable during her two years as ALA president was her refusal to give a nomination of a non- librarian for the head of the Library of Congress. The request was made by the current president, John F. Kennedy, Jr. Spain was quoted as saying, "The Librarian of Congress should be a librarian!"

As ALA president Spain emphasized the value of children's library services, advocating for their integration into broader library systems and promoting literacy through enhanced resources and programs. She guided the ALA in addressing contemporary challenges, such as improving library education and standards. Her presidency saw efforts to strengthen the association's role in shaping national library policies. Spain's global perspective, informed by her work in Thailand, influenced her push for the ALA to support international library development, fostering connections with librarians worldwide.

In 1961, Spain was also honored as the Outstanding Woman of the Year in Library Science by "Who's Who in America."

== Retirement ==
In 1961, Spain retired from both the NYPL and the ALA. After a brief visit to the USSR as part of the American Exchange Mission of Librarians, she moved to Marion County, Florida, to live on land her grandfather had left her and very quickly became bored with the retired lifestyle. She learned of an opening at the Central Florida Junior College and took over as their librarian. Over the years, Spain continued as a guest lecturer at multiple colleges and universities and in 1981 was not only awarded an honorary Doctor of Humanities from Lander College, but also received the Mary Mildred Sullivan Award for distinguished alumna from Winthrop University.

== Publications ==
This is an abbreviated list of publications by Dr. Spain. Some are well-known works, while others are compiled from another bibliography.

- 1940 – School Library Standards. Thesis, M.A. University of Chicago. (Special Collections at Winthrop University Library)
- 1947 – Libraries of South Carolina: Their origins and early history, 1700–1830. Library Quarterly, 17: 28–42. (Summary of Doctoral Thesis)
- 1952 – Some Notes on Libraries in Thailand. Library Quarterly, 22: 252–62.
- 1952 – Teaching Library Science in Thailand. Wilson Library Bulletin, 27: 314–17.
- "The Selection and Acquisition of Books for Children." Library Trends 3 (April 1955): 455-61.
- 1956 – Reading Without Boundaries: essays presented to Anne Carroll Moore on the occasion of the fiftieth anniversary of the inauguration of library service to children at the New York Public Library. (ed.) New York, N.Y.: New York Public Library.
- 1957 – Helping the Child to Read. Saturday Review, 40: 63–64.
- 1960 – The Contents of the Basket: and other papers on children's books and reading. New York, N.Y.: New York Public Library.
- 1960 – Upon the Shining Mountains. ALA Bulletin, 54: 599–602. (ALA Presidential Inaugural Address)

== Footnotes ==
Non-profit organization positions
Preceded by Benjamin E. Powell	President of the American Library Association; 1960–1961	Succeeded by Florrinell F. Morton
