= Edwin Castagna =

American librarian

President of the American Library Association
- In office 1964–1965
- Preceded by: Frederick H. Wagman
- Succeeded by: Robert Vosper

Personal details
- Born: May 1, 1909 Petaluma, California, US
- Died: November 26, 1983 (aged 74) Baltimore, Maryland, US
- Cause of death: Suicide
- Education: University of California, Berkeley
- Occupation: Librarian

Edwin Castagna (May 1, 1909 – November 26, 1983) was a prominent librarian and leader in the profession. Castagna was born in Petaluma, California, to Frank and Eugenia Burgle Castagna. He graduated from the library school at the University of California, Berkeley in 1936 and started his career as an assistant librarian in the Alameda County Public Library in Oakland, California. He left that position within a year to become the library director for the Ukiah, California Public Library.

== Career ==
In 1940 he became Director of the Washoe County Public Library in Reno, Nevada, where he became the first president of the Nevada Library Association

Castagna took a leave of absence to join the U.S. Army to serve in World War II. He assumed command of one of the 771st Tank Battalions deployed to Europe and was awarded the Bronze Star Medal and Purple Heart.

After the war, Castagna returned to Washoe County to continue his work as their library director.

In 1949 Castagna became the director the Glendale, California Public Library and then was appointed director position at the Long Beach Public Library.

While in Long Beach, Castagna served as president of the California Library Association in 1954.

In 1960, Castagna was offered the position of director of the Enoch Pratt Free Library in Baltimore, Maryland. During his tenure, the Pratt Library took responsibility for the Peabody Institute Library and helped to establish a library school at the University of Maryland.

During his time in Baltimore, Castagna served as president of the American Library Association from 1964 to 1965. He retired from the Pratt Library in 1975.

== Death and legacy ==
On November 26, 1983, Castagna and his wife Rachel Dent Castagna took their own lives by taking sleeping pills after Edwin Castagna received a terminal health diagnosis. Their estates were split between bequests to the Enoch Pratt Free Library and the library school at the University of California, Berkeley.

== Selected publications ==
- Castagna, Edwin (1982). Caught in the Act: The Decisive Reading of Some Notable Men and Women and Its Influence on Their Actions and Attitudes. Metuchen, N.J.: Scarecrow Press. ISBN 0810815664.
- Castagna, Edwin (1971). "Censorship, Intellectual Freedom, and Libraries". In Voigt, Melvin J. (ed.). Advances in Librarianship. Vol. 2. New York: Seminar Press. pp. 215–251.
- Long, warm friendship: H.L. Mencken and the Enoch Pratt Free Library (Peacock Press, 1966)
- National inventory of library needs (American Library Association, 1965)
- Coplan, Kate; Castagna, Edwin, eds. (1965). The Library Reaches Out: Reports on Library Service and Community Relations by Some Leading American Librarians. Dobbs Ferry, N.Y.: Oceana Publications.
- Castagna, Edwin (1965). "Climate of intellectual freedom". ALA Bulletin. 59: 27–33.
- Castagna, Edwin (1946). The History of the 771st Tank Battalion. Berkeley, Calif.: Lederer, Street & Zeus. LCCN 46026757. OCLC 5737075.

Non-profit organization positions
Preceded by Frederick H. Wagman	President of the American Library Association; 1964–1965	Succeeded by Robert Vosper
