= Emerson Greenaway =

American librarian (1906–1990)

- Greenaway c. 1955

President of the American Library Association
- In office 1958–1959
- Preceded by: Lucile M. Morsch
- Succeeded by: Benjamin E. Powell

Personal details
- Born: May 25, 1906 Massachusetts, US
- Died: April 8, 1990 (aged 83) New London, New Hampshire, US
- Spouse: Helen Kidder
- Education: The North Carolina Library School
- Known for: Advocate of information freedom
- Awards: Honorary degrees from Wheaton and Drexel; American Libraries 100 most important library figures

Emerson Greenaway (May 25, 1906 – April 8, 1990) was an American librarian of considerable note, particularly during the Cold War era of the 1950s. During his long career, he acted as the director of the Enoch Pratt Free Library of Baltimore, the director of the Free Library of Philadelphia and president of the American Library Association. He was also a highly respected scholar and an advocate for intellectual freedom in wartime. Greenaway also came under fire for his participation in anti-communist government committees. In 1999, American Libraries named Greenaway as one of the one hundred most important library figures of the 20th century.

== Early career ==
Greenaway was born in 1906 in Massachusetts. Although he would go on to have considerable influence over libraries in all of the United States, Greenaway never lived far from the East coast. Greenaway was educated at the University of North Carolina School of Information and Library Science (then called "The North Carolina Library School"). Greenaway eventually received honorary degrees from both Wheaton College and Drexel University.

The true beginning of Greenaway's illustrious library career occurred in April 1945, when he became the director of Baltimore's Pratt Library. During his time as head of the Pratt Library, Greenaway introduced both a film department and the bookmobile, both of which continue to serve the Baltimore community today. Greenaway was a longtime advocate of adult education but also placed a great deal of emphasis on children's within the Pratt Library. While with the Pratt Library, Greenaway also began to study international libraries. This fascination would follow him throughout the remainder of his life.

== Philadelphia years ==
In 1951, Greenaway stepped down as director of the Pratt Library to begin his position as head of Philadelphia's Free Library. It was during this era (until his 1969 retirement from both the Free Library and the bulk of his library career) that Greenaway's life was perhaps most driven and interesting. The political climate during his time in Philadelphia forced him to confront issues of race, political motivations, library funding and information freedom.

Greenaway pushed to expand library systems in many ways. He was a vocal proponent of federal funding for libraries rather than requiring smaller communities to take on the bulk of the financial burden. Greenaway also supported the concept of urban library systems which would consolidate the collections and resources of many smaller rural libraries into one more expansive system. In a 1959 speech and accompanying article for the American Philosophical Society, he detailed his own plans to create physical library spaces to better serve patrons. Chief among his ideas were proper space and physical buildings adapted to the needs of the community.

== Cold War era ==
Greenaway's relationship with the Cold War era and the (second) Red Scare was extremely complicated. Primarily, Greenaway was a strong proponent of intellectual freedom. In the 1950s he served as chair for the Intellectual Freedom Committee, a branch of the American Library Association which tasks itself with protecting the privacy rights of library patrons. In 1950 he led an unsuccessful fight against the "Ober Oath," one of many "loyalty oaths" directed at libraries put in place by the United States government. However, Greenaway also supported anti-communist measures by the United States and was privately thought by many to be a supporter of Joseph McCarthy. Greenaway argued that one of the main purposes of public access to information was to educate the masses against beliefs he found undesirable, such as communism. One may perhaps surmise that Greenaway was himself politically conservative but nevertheless respected and believed in the value of freedom to information.

Despite Greenaway's dedication to information freedom, he came under fire when the Free Library was named in the Access to Public Libraries study to be one of three urban Northern libraries (the other two being Detroit and Washington, D.C.) which openly discriminated against African-Americans. Greenaway hotly contested the methods used by the survey.

== Later career ==
In 1955 the American Library Association honored him with the Joseph W. Lippincott Award for distinguished service to the profession of librarianship. The height of Greenaway's career was from 1958 to 1959, during which time he served as president of the American Library Association. During this time Greenaway continued to be active in issues of censorship and freedom of information. His involvement with the ALA did not cease after he stepped down from the presidency. He was elected to the American Philosophical Society in 1960. In 1964, he participated in an ALA-sponsored delegation trip to the Soviet Union, an area he had studied closely during his time as president of the ALA. He also continued to serve on several task forces for the ALA. He received a special citation in 1976 at the centennial of the Association.

Following his retirement from the library world at large in 1969, Greenaway moved to New London, N.H. with his wife, Helen (Kidder) Greenaway. He continued to volunteer in libraries until close to his death.

== Selected publications ==
- Greenaway, Emerson (August 15, 1960). "The Relation of Library Buildings to Library Functions". Proceedings of the American Philosophical Society. 104 (4): 391–397.
- Greenaway, Emerson (1965). "Revitalizing A Library". In Coplan, Kate; Castagna, Edwin (eds.). The Library Reaches Out: Reports on Library Service and Community Relations by Some Leading American Librarians. Oceana Publications. pp. 1–20.
- Greenaway, Emerson (1958). Recommendations to meet service requirements: report of a survey conducted for the Library Commission in 1958. San Francisco, Calif.: San Francisco Public Library.

Non-profit organization positions
| Preceded by Lucile M. Morsch | President of the American Library Association; 1958–1959 | Succeeded by Benjamin E. Powell |
