= Carlos Victor Penna =

Argentinean library planner and organizer

Director of the Regional Office for the Western Hemisphere, UNESCO
- In office 1962–1970

Personal details
- Born: Carlos Victor Penna; 1 October 1911 Bahía Blanca, Buenos Aires, Argentina
- Died: 21 February 1998 (aged 86) Tampa, Florida
- Spouse: Rita Maria Valdes
- Children: Luis Carlos Penna, Victor Oscar Penna.
- Occupation: library planner and organizer

Carlos Victor Penna (Bahía Blanca, Buenos Aires, 1 October 1911 – Tampa, Florida, 21 February 1998) was an Argentine library planner and organizer.

== Academic career ==
From New York, Penna returned to Argentina with a collection of books and a wealth of new knowledge, which he incorporated into his first publication, Catalogación y clasificación de libros (Buenos Aires: Acme Agency, 1945), which marked the beginning of modern librarianship in Argentina. Considered by Argentinians as the leading text, it was used by generations of librarians in schools throughout Latin America. Penna's return to Buenos Aires brought this initial period of his education and career to a close.

In 1943, the University of Buenos Aires took an important step toward improving its library system by establishing the Instituto Bibliotecológico, now known as SISBI: Sistema de Bibliotecas y de Información (Library and Information System). The institute was the brainchild of Ernesto G. Gietz, the library director of the School of Engineering (Facultad de Ingeniería y Ciencias Exactas) at the time. The institute received enthusiastic support, not only from the administration, but also from various organizations in the United States that Gietz had visited. In addition to his duties as head of the university's central card catalogue, Penna also assumed the position of assistant director of the then newly created institute.

In 1946, after he founded the Instituto Bibliotecológico, Penna moved to the Biblioteca de Marina. Then, in 1947, he assumed the directorship of the National Postal Library, an institution that focused on the underprivileged. Under Penna's guidance, it became one of the most organized library systems in the nation. Today, it is a branch of the Biblioteca del Congreso de la Nación (the Argentinian Library of Congress).

== UNESCO career ==
In 1951, Penna received an offer to join UNESCO as a specialist in its Regional Office for the Western Hemisphere, of which he became director in 1962. In Carlos Victor Penna's words,

"Scholarship and culture represent a precious source of national wealth. This is why, in every development plan as well as all educational planning, keeping an individual well-informed is an important means of encouraging economic and social development. In order to be educated and cultured, one needs an efficient system of education, which is hardly conceived without a cultivated and systematic habit of reading. Reading presupposes the availability of books and consequently a library is needed. Without libraries, there can be no good primary schools, no efficient secondary schools and no productive universities. In the absence of libraries, it is neither possible to encourage nor to maintain a permanent education for adults…."

Penna retired from UNESCO in 1971.

=== Personal life ===
In 1954, Carlos Victor Penna married Rita Maria Valdes in Havana, Cuba. They had two children, Luis Carlos and Victor Oscar. In 1964, Penna moved to Paris with his family. After retiring in 1971 from UNESCO, he moved to Palma de Mallorca, Spain. In 1974, he relocated to Yonkers, NY. In 1981, he moved to his final home in Tampa, Florida, where he lived with his wife and three children for the remainder of his life, until his death on 21 February 1998.

== Bibliography ==
- 1945. Catalogacion y Classificacion de Libros, acme agency; Buenos Aires
- 1967. Planning Library Services
- 1970. The Planning of Library and Documentation Services 2nd ed
- 1971. La planificacion des services de bibliothèque et documentatation
- 1976. Thirty Years of Action by UNESCO for the Development of Documentation, Library and Archive Services in its Member States, UNESCO Volume 30 No. 6
- 1979. Planning of Library and Documentation Services
- 1994. Modernizacion de la Biblioteca Nacional
