= Barrett Faulkner =

American politician

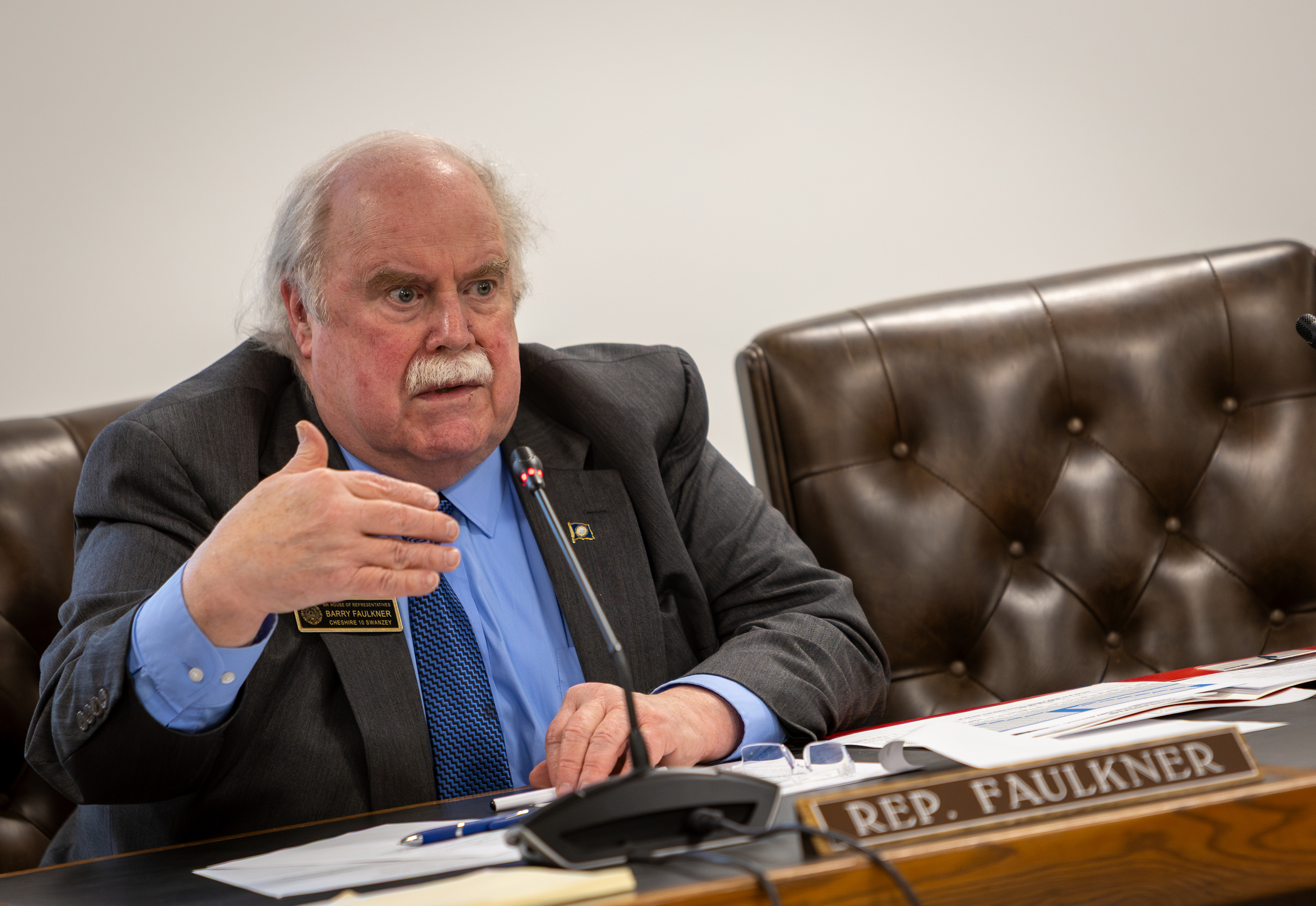
- Faulkner in 2026

Member of the New Hampshire House of Representatives from the Cheshire 10th district
- Incumbent
- Assumed office 2016
- Succeeded by: Alan Gross (elect)

Personal details
- Party: Democratic
- Education: Harvard College (BA); Harvard Graduate School of Design (MCP); Suffolk University Law School (JD)

F. Barrett Faulkner is an American politician. He was elected to the New Hampshire House of Representatives as a Democrat to represent Cheshire District 12, and continued to represent the district following its 2022 redistricting as Cheshire District 10.
