= Don Pietromonaco =

American actor

- Born: Donald Stephen Pietromonaco; September 15, 1935; Los Angeles, California, United States
- Died: April 18, 1997 (aged 61); Los Angeles, California, United States
- Occupations: Actors, radio personality, voice-over coach
- Years active: 1948–1995
- Children: Dena Pietromonaco, Doug Lyon,

Donald Stephen Pietromonaco (September 15, 1935 – April 18, 1997) was an American child actor, award-winning radio personality and voice actor whose career would span more than 47 years.

== Early years ==
In the summer of 1948 at the age 13 Don began his acting career as Don Pietro by appearing in a number of major Hollywood productions including his first film The Boy with Green Hair with Robert Ryan and Pat O'Brien followed a year later by Mrs. Mike with Dick Powell. In the 1950s there came a string of nice roles like Follow the Sun with Glenn Ford, The Gene Autry Show as Pepito Garcia and Girls in the Night with Harvey Lembeck. In 1957 Don played a Page on an ocean liner in the film classic An Affair to Remember opposite Cary Grant.

In 1947 as a child Don was hired to open the play, Galileo, by Bertold Brecht and starring Charles Laughton, at the Coronet Theatre in Los Angeles, and later in Broadway. In his later years Don related stories of Brecht and Charlie Chaplin in the audience during rehearsal, teasing him with his new nickname, “Porky.”

== Radio broadcasting career ==
By 1960 Don made a transition from the big screen to Don Pietro, Disc Jockey at KROG, Sonora, California where he began toying with various character voices while developing an on-air persona that became one of the country's most theatrically gifted air talents. In 1963 program director Guy Williams aka L.David Moorhead hired him for the all-important early evening slot at legendary top forty rocker, KRIZ. Using the air name "The Purple Pizza Eater", Don along with his sidekick Bruno J. Grunion, a mythical teenage ne'er-do-well voiced by Pietro (unbeknownst to the listening teen audience, the two garnered huge ratings in the Phoenix market and his reputation as an on-air entertainer began capturing national attention and the management of St. Louis giant, KXOK-AM 630.

Known to thousands of radio listeners as "Johnny Rabbitt", Don along with his faithful companion Bruno J. Grunion, the two would delight their predominantly teen audience from 7 pm to midnight with outlandish antics such as Rabbitt feeding Bruno to a "man-eating plant." But of course Bruno would always survive because the plant would spit him out. The throngs of teens calling the station's request lines with their problems or dedications could simply, "Blab it to the Rabbitt." From 1964 through 1968 Don Pietro would enjoy some of the highest ratings ever recorded to date in the St. Louis market.

Upon Pietromonaco's departure from KXOK in 1969, Don and Bruno returned once again to Phoenix and KRIZ Radio this time for the 3-7 PM Drive slot where he would earn Billboard Magazine's coveted Major Market Performer of the Year award. KRIZ would be his last job as a disc jockey and for him and Bruno, the end of era. In 2001, Don Pietromonaco would be inducted into the St. Louis Radio Hall of Fame.

== Post radio days ==
After his departure from live radio in 1971, Pietromonaco began teaching film production and voiceovers in Hollywood, as well as voicing numerous commercials.

At the age of 61, Don Pietromonaco, actor and veteran voiceover coach, died from complications due to emphysema.

== Trivia ==
- He once sent a film clip to the children's show The Banana Splits entitled "Pop Cop". This was a sped-up depiction of a policeman directing traffic at a St. Louis intersection, and the name "Pietromonaco" can be seen on a street sign at the beginning.
- During his days at KXOK in St. Louis, Pietromonaco helped raise several million dollars for medical research.

The "Pop Cop" in the Banana Splits video was Owen Dacey, a popular 5th District motorcycle traffic officer in the Hyde Park area of North St. Louis. The clip shows him at the intersection of North Grand Ave & North Broadway. He was known to locals as the "Dancing Cop".
