= Chris Snyder (American football, born 1961) =

American football coach (born 1961)

Current position
- Title: Athletic director
- Team: Seton Hill
- Conference: PSAC

Playing career
- 1985–1988: Randolph–Macon
- Position: Offensive lineman

Coaching career (HC unless noted)
- 1989–1990: Alfred (GA)
- 1991–1992: Marietta (OL)
- 1993–2001: Bethany (WV) (OC/OL)
- 2002–2003: Bethany (WV)
- 2005–2007: Seton Hill

Administrative career (AD unless noted)
- 2008–present: Seton Hill

Head coaching record
- Overall: 25–25

Chris Snyder is an American football coach and college athletics administrator. He served as the head coach at Bethany College in Bethany, West Virginia from 2002 to 2003 and at Seton Hill University from 2005 to 2007.

== Head coaching record ==
=== College ===
Year	Team	Overall	Conference	Standing	Bowl/playoffs
Bethany Bison (Presidents' Athletic Conference) (2002–2003)
2002	Bethany	3–7	1–4		
2003	Bethany	1–9	0–5		
Bethany:		4–16	1–9		
Seton Hill Griffins (Independent) (2005)
2005	Seton Hill	7–3			
Seton Hill Griffins (West Virginia Intercollegiate Athletic Conference) (2006–2007)
2006	Seton Hill	7–3	6–2		
2007	Seton Hill	7–3	5–2		
Seton Hill:		21–9	11–4		
Total:		25–25			
