= Rita Nealon Cooley =

American political scientist

- Born: 1919 or 1920; New York City
- Died: October 1, 2006; New York City
- Education: Hunter College; New York University
- Scientific career
- Fields: Political science
- Workplaces: New York University

Rita Nealon Cooley (often published as Rita W. Cooley; died October 1, 2006) was an American political scientist. She was a professor of political science at New York University, and was chair of the Department of Politics there in 1975. She was the first woman to teach, have tenure, be full professor, or be department chair in the Department of Politics at NYU. Cooley's research largely focused on the history of the American judiciary, and on social science pedagogy.

== Life and career ==
Cooley was born in New York City in 1919. She attended Hunter College, where she was a member of Phi Beta Kappa and graduated in 1940. In 1943 she began to study at New York University, where she obtained an M.A. in 1946 and a PhD in 1949. She continued teaching classes at New York University after completing her degree, and remained there for the rest of her 42-year-long career. When Cooley began teaching in that department, she was the only woman teaching there, and she was also the first woman to become a full professor or receive tenure in the Department of Politics at New York University. She served a term as chair of the politics department beginning in 1975, and was also the first woman to do so. While a professor at New York University, she taught more than 30,000 students, and she won 7 university-wide teaching awards: she was selected by undergraduates to win seven Golden Dozen awards, which recognize the student body's 12 favorite professors, as well as the 1967 Great Teacher Award.

Cooley's scholarship largely focused on American judicial politics, as well as on pedagogy and teaching social science in universities. In 1950, she co-authored the textbook Government in American Society. She also wrote on legal history in the United States, for example on the origin of attorneys general in America or the United States Marshals Service.

Cooley's husband was Hollis R. Cooley, who was a professor of mathematics at New York University. Rita Cooley retired in 1986. Upon her retirement, the Department of Politics at New York University named a seminar room for her, and an award was endowed in her honor. She died on October 1, 2006.

== Selected works ==
- Government in American Society (1950)
- "Predecessors of the Federal Attorney General: The Attorney General in England and the American Colonies", The American journal of legal history (1958)
- "Teaching Note: The Effect of the Introductory Political Science Course on Student Attitudes Toward Personal Political Participation", The American Political Science Review (1958)
- "The Office of United States Marshal", Western Political Quarterly (1959)
