= Al Gross (broadcaster) =

American broadcaster

Al Gross is an American broadcaster and host of National Countdown Show. He is president of Signature Media Group, Inc, which syndicates the show. He is also a voice actor and radio broadcast consultant.

Gross was born in Milwaukee, Wisconsin and grew up in Ventura, California. He studied pastoral theology at Liberty University (then Lynchburg Baptist College) in 1973–74. As a broadcaster, he worked mostly in Southern California in radio including KWIZ AM & FM in Santa Ana and KEZY in Anaheim, and was the first radio station manager for Calvary Chapel's KWVE-FM San Clemente. In 1987, he went to Focus on the Family where he was one of the original writers and contributors for Family News in Focus. At KBRT-AM 740 (Los Angeles) he was co-host of Mornings with Tim and Al with Tim Berends. Gross and Berends were voted Los Angeles' "Top Jocks" by readers of the Los Angeles Herald-Examiner (Hearst Newspapers) in 1986. Later that year, Los Angeles Mayor Tom Bradley proclaimed "Tim and Al day in Los Angeles" with an official proclamation. In 1994, Gross moved to Saint Louis where he co-hosted the morning show on KJSL AM 630 for 14 years.

In 2007, he formed Signature Media Group, Inc. and created National Countdown Show. It is the only top 40 oldies countdown show covering the golden age of top 40 radio (1955 to 1970). Every week, Gross counts down the top 40 songs using data primarily from Cashbox magazine. Each show uses the original songs, jingles, newscasts and even vintage commercials. He owns one of the largest private pop music record collection in the United States. He is still active in commercial voiceovers, radio drama and broadcast consulting.
