= Mary Virginia Gaver =

American librarian (1906–1991)

President of the American Library Association
- In office 1966–1967
- Preceded by: Robert Vosper
- Succeeded by: Foster E. Mohrhardt

Personal details
- Born: December 10, 1906 Washington, D.C., US
- Died: December 31, 1991 (aged 85) Danville, Virginia, US
- Education: Randolph–Macon College; Columbia University
- Occupation: Librarian; educator; writer; editor

Mary Virginia Gaver (December 10, 1906 – December 31, 1991) was a United States librarian. She was president of the American Library Association 1966–1967. Gaver was considered one of the most important leaders in library science in the 20th century. She was awarded American Library Association Honorary Membership, its highest honor, in 1976.

== Biography ==
Mary Virginia Gaver was the oldest of three children born to Clayton Daniel Gaver and Ruth Lydia Clendenning Gaver. She was born on December 10, 1906, in Washington, D.C. Her siblings were brother, Perry, who died of an injury while attending Virginia Tech, and Lydia, a history teacher at Stratford College. Mary's father relocated the family to the mill town of Danville, Virginia located in Pittsylvania County. Her father's family had owned and operated Gaver Woolen Mill in Hillsboro, Virginia in the 1800s. She arrived in Danville in 1912 and lived there for much of her life. It was her life in the impoverished area that influenced her and shaped much of what she did later in her career as an educator, author and a librarian.

Gaver's interest in books was displayed when she was very young. Since her mother was a teacher, she had grown up in a family where books were an important component to education and enrichment. While still a young child, she discovered that many of the local school children in Schoolfield, Virginia, which is a suburb of Danville, did not have access to books. To help alleviate this situation, she convinced her mother to help collect money to start a school library in this nearby town. Mary Gaver and her mother solicited donations door-to-door and gathered $100 that was then graciously matched by executives at Dan River Mill, where her father was executive secretary to the president, for a total of $200. This was enough to start a school library for the area children.

== Education ==
Gaver attended the local public schools until she enrolled in fifth grade at the Randolph-Macon Institute, which was a private girls school. After graduation, her mother wanted her to attend the prestigious Trinity College which is currently known as Duke University. Although she had earned a scholarship to cover the cost of her education at Trinity, she chose to further her education at Randolph-Macon Women's College. At the age of 21, she received a B.A. with a major in English and two minors that included Bible and the organ.

Gaver's education continued while she was employed full-time and often took classes during the summers. She earned a B.S. in library sciences in 1932 from Columbia University and went on to earn an M.S. in library sciences, also at Columbia in 1938. Gaver did take additional classes later in her career and was awarded an honorary doctoral degree by Columbia.

== Career ==
She followed in her mother's footsteps and became an English teacher at a local high school, but she disliked the job. While having an extensive background in English, she encountered problems with the management of her classroom. Her principal recommended that she transfer to a position in the school's library the following school year. That summer she not only worked in a library, but she also got some training at George Washington University to help improve on the fact that she had no formal schooling in library sciences. This unplanned job transfer, led to a long career as a librarian and advocate for the development of school libraries.

She worked at George Washington High School for 10 years before she earned her degree in library science. While working as a librarian during The Depression, she became aware of the funding problems of the library systems. Due to this, Gaver decided to dedicate her life not only to improving funding for the library systems but to get training in the schools to help improve the skills of the staff as well as the library skills of the children.

Gaver taught at many different schools and colleges, including 12 years (1942–1954) at the New Jersey State Teachers College. In addition, she was an associate professor, then a professor, at Rutgers University for the Graduate School of Library Services for which she held that position for 17 years from 1954 to 1971. In 1970, while at Rutgers University, Gaver served as a committee member of the Rutgers University Council on Children's Literature. She also embarked on an international mission to assist other countries improve their library systems, worked as a visiting professor at the University of Teheran, and became an advisor to Iran in 1952–1953.

During her time at Rutgers, she worked on several projects to help improve the library system. She was passionate about her work and wanted others to realize the importance of a well trained library staff and the benefit it had on the students' educational outcomes. Her work included, but is not limited to, the following projects: Every Child Needs a School Library, 1957; Effectiveness of Centralized School Library Services (Phase I), 1959–1960; Standards for School Library Programs, 1960; Are You Ready?, 1960; Creative Elementary School Library, 1962; Effectiveness of Centralize Library Service in Elementary Schools, 1963; and Libraries for the People of New Jersey, 1964.

Gaver's career and influence as a librarian and author did not end when she retired from Rutgers University. She continued to conduct research, write, edit and publish articles well after her career as an educator ended. She went on to hold several positions, including vice president at Brodart Industries, a wholesale book supplier. Gaver stopped working at Brodart Industries in 1975.

== Association leadership ==
Gaver also held many prominent positions including serving as president for not only the New Jersey Library Association (1954–1955) but for the American Association of School Librarians (1957–1958) and the American Library Association (1966–1967).

== Awards and honors ==
In addition to her leadership roles in various organizations, she earned several awards throughout her lifetime. These awards include:

- Herbert Putnam Honor Award, American Library Association, 1963;
- Rutgers's Research Council Award, 1962;
- Randolph-Macon Woman's College Achievement Award, 1964;
- Beta Phi Mu
- Award of Good Teaching, 1964;
- Constance Lindsay Skinner Award, Woman's National Book Association, 1973;
- American Library Association Honorary Membership, 1976;
- President's Award, American Association of School Librarians, 1980.
- The Mary V. Gaver Scholarship was established by the American Library Association in 2001 in Gaver's memory.

Mary Gaver never married and died at the age of 85 on December 31, 1991, while suffering from Parkinson's disease. She left a lasting effect on how school libraries are run today.

== Selected publications ==
- Gaver, Mary Virginia (1988). A Braided Cord: Memoirs of a School Librarian. Metuchen, N.J.: Scarecrow Press.*
- Gaver, Mary V. (1969). "Librarians in the Academic Community—A New Breed?". Wilson Library Bulletin.
- Gaver, Mary V., ed. (1965). The Elementary School Library Collection: A Guide to Books and Other Media, Phases 1–2–3. Newark, NJ: Brodart Foundation.
- Gaver, Mary V.; Martin, Lowell A. (1964). Libraries for the People of New Jersey; or, Knowledge for All. Trenton: New Jersey Library Association.
- Gaver, Mary V. (1963). Effectiveness of Centralized Library Service in Elementary Schools (2nd ed.). New Brunswick, NJ: Rutgers University Press.
- Gaver, Mary V. (1962). "The Creative Elementary School Librarian". Wilson Library Bulletin.
- Gaver, Mary V. (1957). Every Child Needs a School Library. Chicago: American Library Association.

Non-profit organization positions
| Preceded by Robert Vosper | President of the American Library Association; 1966–1967 | Succeeded by Foster E. Mohrhardt |
