= Alan Gross (New Hampshire politician) =

American politician

Member-elect of the New Hampshire House of Representatives from the Cheshire 10th district
- Assuming office December 2026
- Succeeding: Barrett Faulkner

Personal details
- Party: Democratic

Alan Gross is an American politician. A member of the Democratic Party, he is the member-elect for the Cheshire 10th district of the New Hampshire House of Representatives.
