= Jacquelin Smith Cooley =

Botanist (1883–1965)

- Born: July 24, 1883
- Died: July 8, 1965 (aged 81)
- Education: Randolph–Macon College; Virginia Tech; Washington University
- Known for: Botany

Jacquelin Smith Cooley (July 24, 1883 – July 8, 1965) was a botanist and pathologist with an expertise in the study of fungi, lichen, and spermatophytes.

Cooley received an A.B. from Randolph–Macon College and M.S. from Virginia Polytechnic Institute. Cooley was awarded a Ph.D. from Washington University in St. Louis.

Cooley was a long-time member of the Botanical Society. Cooley was once a pathologist in the Bureau of Plant Industry with the U.S. Department of Agriculture in Washington, D.C., and worked there for 37 years, later retiring in 1951 (though Cooley continued to be active in botanical interests).

== Research and publications ==
- 1922 Botanical Specimen
- 1924 Botanical Specimen
- A Study of the Physiological Relations of Sclerotinia cinerea (Bon.)
- Control of Botrytis rot of pears with chemically treated wrappers
- Diseases of apples in storage
- Foliage diseases of the apple: Report on spraying experiments in 1910 and 1911
- Preventing black rot losses in sweet potatoes
