= Mason Cooley =

American academic

Mason Cooley (1927 – July 25, 2002) was an American aphorist known for his witty aphorisms. One of the aphorisms Cooley developed was "The time I kill is killing me."

He was professor emeritus of French, speech and world literature at the College of Staten Island. He was also an assistant professor of English at Columbia University from 1959 to 1967 and an adjunct professor from 1980 to 1988.

He received his B.A. from San Diego State University and his Ph.D. from Oxford.
