= Lou Cooley =

Cowboy and alleged gunfighter from Arizona

Lou Cooley was a cowboy, and alleged gunfighter who took part in the Earp-Clanton feud in Tombstone, AZ from 1880 to 1882.

== Biography ==
Cooley's reputation as a gunfighter is mostly hearsay. There are no known gunfights involving Cooley. The one confirmed fact is that he was one of the suspects in the death of Johnny Ringo who was found in West Turkey Creek, Tombstone AZ, with a bullet wound to the head. Cooley was one of the few men who did not fear Ringo, and had the skills necessary to survive a confrontation with him. But few feared Ringo, though he had a fearsome temper, he never killed anyone aside from unarmed men, a fact since confirmed by historians. Cooley was alleged to have been good with a gun, however, there is nothing to indicate he actually put those skills to work.

It was suggested that a posse led by Wyatt Earp located Ringo, who spotted them and grabbed his guns to run for a canyon. Two theories exist: Cooley shot him as he ran with a rifle; or that Cooley killed him one on one. Neither version can be proven. Cooley supported the Earp faction, but he has never been mentioned as having taken active part in the Earp Vendetta Ride. He is believed to have helped fund the ride, and to have been employed as a stage coach driver for Wells Fargo at the time.

Although his personal exploits have no written proof, Cooley was a friend to Wyatt Earp, as well as Doc Holliday. Cooley was also a close friend of Virgil Earp. It is widely known that Lou Cooley sided against the "Cowboys" with Virgil Earp at a time when the confrontation between the Earps and Clantons reached a boiling point, but there are no documented accounts of him having any clashes with any of the Clanton clan, or the "Cowboys". He did have a reputation of being fast with a gun, and an excellent shot. Morgan Earp, another friend of Cooley's, reported that he could shoot a silver dollar out of a person's hand before they could slap their hands together.

It has been suggested that it was Lou Cooley that shot and killed Ike Clanton in Mexico, and that he did so to end more backshooting from the cowboys against the Earps—at that point both Morgan and Virgil had been ambushed. However, that was a complete fabrication, since Ike Clanton's death was a well documented event, with him having been killed by Detective Jonas V. Brighton in Springerville, Arizona. In fact, there are no documented facts confirming Cooley having ever been involved in any gunfight.

Cooley has at times been confused with lawman/outlaw Scott Cooley, but the two are not the same. Lou Cooley disappeared from public view after the end of the Earp-Clanton fighting, and continued a normal life. He died in Oak Hill, Tennessee at the age of 93 and is buried outside of Nashville. His descendants still reside there.
