= Toni Carbo =

American information scientist

Director of the National Commission on Libraries and Information Science
- In office 1980–1986
- Preceded by: Alphonse F. Trezza
- Succeeded by: Vivian J. Arterbery

Personal details
- Occupation: Information scientist
- Scientific career
- Education: Brown University (BA); Drexel University (MA, PhD)
- Known for: Information ethics; Founding ASIS&T SIG/International Information Issues; Founding member of the iSchools Caucus
- Awards: Fellow of the American Association for the Advancement of Science; Fellow of the Special Libraries Association; iCaucus Raymond von Dran Award; ASIS&T Award of Merit
- Fields: Information science
- Workplaces: National Federation of Advanced Information Services; University of Pittsburgh
- Website: sites.pitt.edu/~carbo/

Toni Carbo (also published as Toni Carbo Bearman) is a retired American information scientist and a professor emerita in the School of Computing and Information at the University of Pittsburgh. She is a founder of the AIST Special Interest Group/International Information Issues and of the iSchools Caucus, and a former president of the Association for Library and Information Science Education.

== Education and career ==
Carbo began working in the information science field in 1962. She earned an A.B in English literature at Brown University in 1969. She then went to the Drexel University College of Information Studies for a master's degree in 1973 and a Ph.D. in 1977.

She worked as executive director of the National Federation of Abstracting and Indexing Services from 1974 to 1979, and then (after briefly working for the Institution of Electrical Engineers in London) as executive director of the National Commission on Libraries and Information Science from 1980 to 1986.

She came to the University of Pittsburgh as professor of information sciences and dean of the School of Information Sciences in 1986, and continued as dean until 2002. Carbo had a desire to add a course on information ethics to the school, and with the help of Professor Stephen Almagno, they started with a lecture series in 1989 with Robert Drinan as their first lecturer. The success of the lecture series led to Carbo and Almagno creating and teaching a graduate level course the following year called The Ethics of Information in Society, which was later renamed Information Ethics. She retired as professor emerita in 2009.

With Michael Menou, she founded the Special Interest Group/International Information Issues of the Association for Information Science and Technology in 1982. In the late 1980s, Carbo initiated regular meetings among the then-three deans of information schools, and revitalized the group in the late 1990s. It became the iSchools Caucus, an international consortium of over 100 information schools. She was president of the Association for Library and Information Science Education for 1997–1998.

== Publications and presentations ==
Carbo has published and presented widely from the 1980s to the 2000s. She covered many information science topics, including information ethics (both the subject itself and how to teach information science students about the topic), e-government, global information infrastructure, and information policy.

== Recognition ==
In 1981, Carbo was named as a Fellow of the American Association for the Advancement of Science. She also became a Fellow of the Special Libraries Association in 1993.

In 2010, she became the inaugural recipient of the iCaucus Raymond von Dran Award, recognizing her pioneering efforts in the 1980s and 1990s to define the field of information science. She was the 2018 recipient of the Award of Merit - Association for Information Science and Technology.
