= José-Marie Griffiths =

English academic administrator (born 1952)

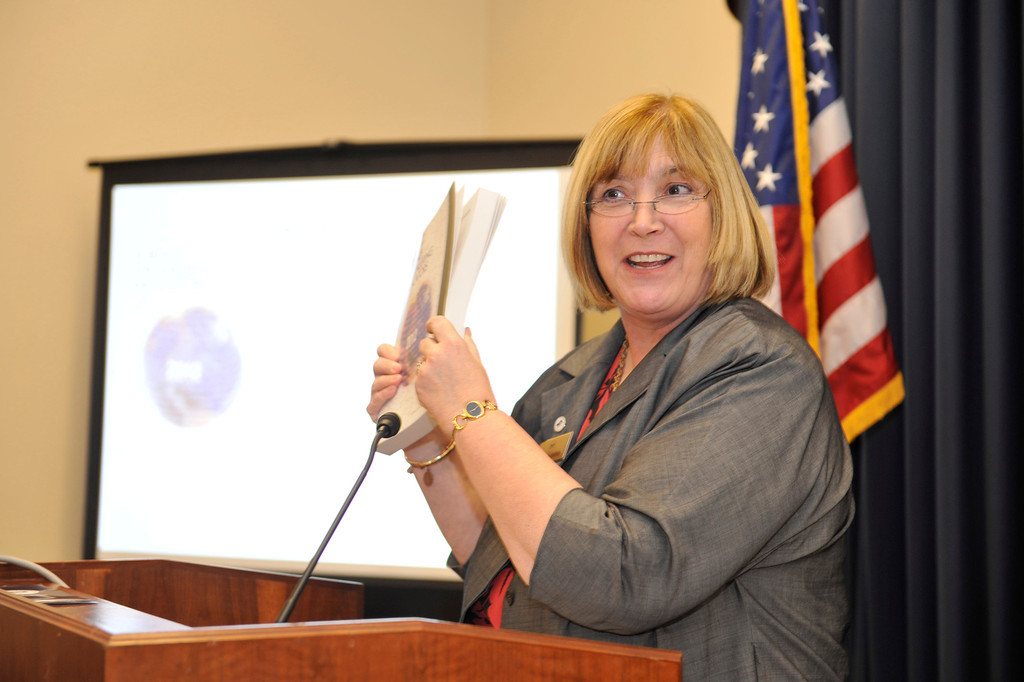
- Griffiths in 2012

Chancellor of Dakota State University
- Incumbent
- Assumed office 2026

President of Dakota State University
- In office 2015–2026
- Preceded by: Marysz Rames
- Succeeded by: John R. Ballard

Vice President of Bryant University
- In office 2010–2015

Personal details
- Born: 31 March 1952 (age 74) Isleworth, Middlesex, England
- Spouse: Donald King (died 2019)
- Children: 1
- Education: University College, London (BS, PhD)
- Occupation: Academic administrator

José-Marie Griffiths (born 31 March 1952) is an British academic administrator and currently the chancellor of Dakota State University in the United States. She also serves as an independent director at Daktronics, Inc. and formerly held the role of vice president of Academic Affairs at Bryant University.

== Early life and education ==
Griffiths was born on 31 March 1952 in Isleworth, Middlesex.

She holds a Bachelor of Science degree (BSc) in Physics with Honours (1973) and a PhD in Information Science from University College, London (1977). She completed a postdoctoral fellowship in Computer Science and Statistics at University College, London, and in 2016 was awarded an Honorary degree in Science by the same institution.

== Career ==
Griffiths (center of top row) served on the National Science Board from 2006-2012, having been nominated by President Bush and confirmed by the Senate. Photo taken on 13 December 2011.

In 1992, Griffiths was appointed director of the School of Information Sciences at the University of Tennessee. In 1994, she additionally assumed the role of vice chancellor for Computing & Telecommunications/Informations Infrastructure at the same institution, a position she held until 1996.

From 1996 to 2001, she served as chief information officer at the University of Michigan. During this period, she was also a commissioner of the Michigan Information Technology Commission and a professor of information.

Griffiths has served on various national committees and advisory bodies in the United States. She was a member of the National Commission on Libraries and Information Science between 1996 and 2003, a position that she was appointed to by the President of the United States. She received a further two presidential appointments: serving on the Information Technology Advisory Committee in 2005 and the National Science Board from 2006 until 2012.

Between 2004 and 2006, Griffiths was a board member of the National Science and Technology Medals Foundation and led projects for the Department of Energy, the National Institute of Health, and NASA (2004–2006) among others.

From 2001 to 2004, she was director of the Sara Fine Institute for Interpersonal Behavior and Technology, and held the Doreen E. Boyce Chair in the School of Information Sciences at the University of Pittsburgh.

Griffiths served as dean of the School of Information and Library Sciences at the University of North Carolina from 2004 to 2009.

From 2010 to 2015, Griffiths was vice president for Academic Affairs and professor at Bryant University in Rhode Island, after which she became president of Dakota State University in Madison, South Dakota.

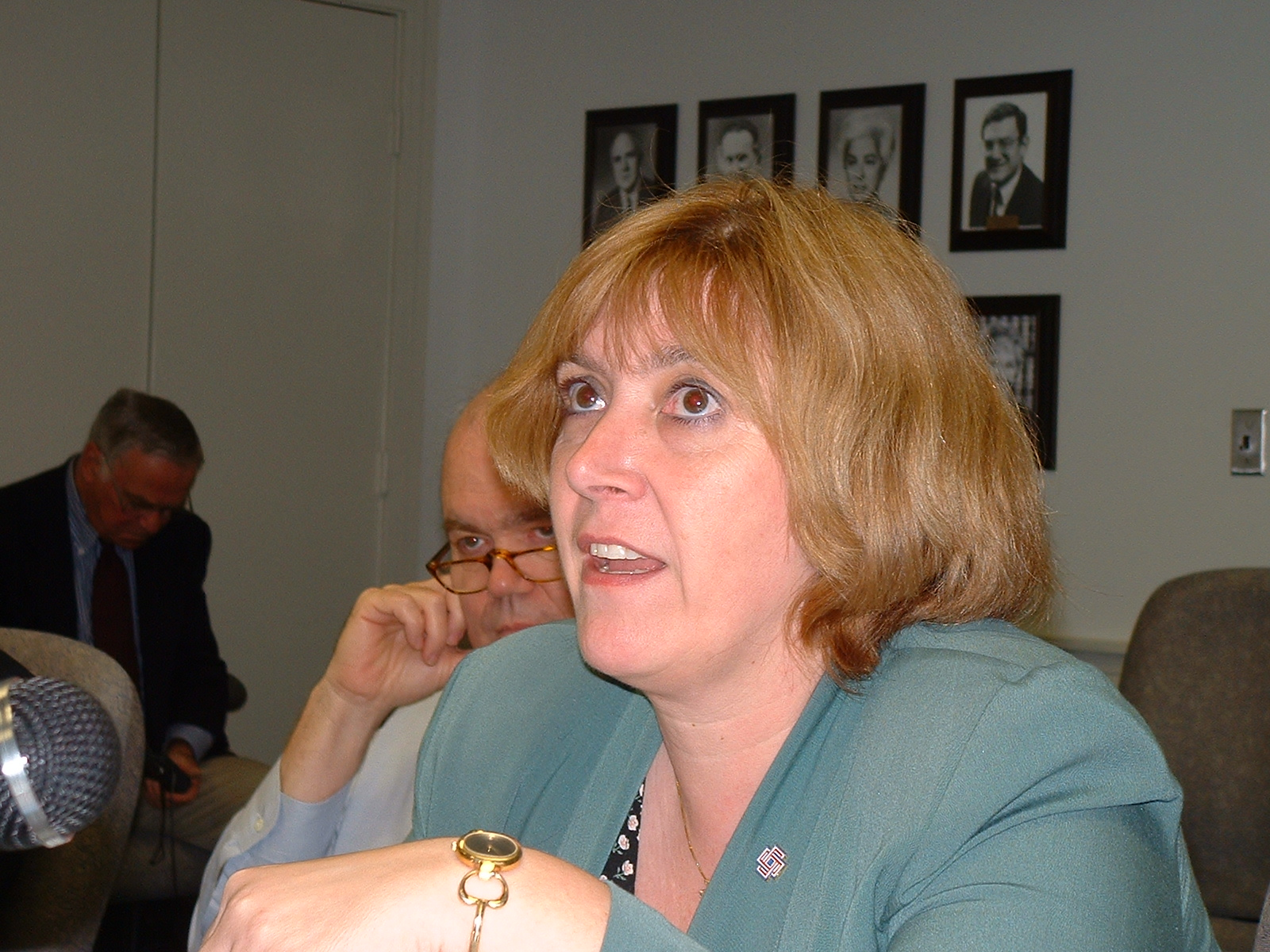
Griffiths at an NCLIS meeting in 2002.

Griffiths was a member of the Task Force on Artificial Intelligence and National Security at the Center for a New American Security (CNSA), and contributed to the Education Summit (1996–2001) and the White House Cyber Workforce initiative. Additionally, Griffiths is an expert advisor for the National Science & Technology Medals Foundation.

In 2018, she was nominated by the then-Chairman of the Senate Committee on Commerce, Science, and Transportations, Senator John Thune, to serve on the National Security Commission on Artificial Intelligence (NSCAI).

Griffiths was appointed to the board of directors at Daktronics on 2 September 2020.

In June 2021, Griffiths participated in a panel on responsible AI hosted by the Women's Foreign Policy Group (WFPG) to discuss the recent report of the NSCAI. The commission concluded its work in October 2021 after it released its final report. Also in 2021, she became an expert advisor to the Special Competitive Studies Projects (SCSP) which continues aspects of the NSCAI's work.

Griffiths is a fellow of the American Association for the Advancement of Science. She is also the author or co-author of nine books and numerous other publications.

In October 2025, it was announced that Griffiths will transition from Dakota State University President to Dakota State University Chancellor. This move was made to provide continued support to national cyber education programs.

== Personal life ==
She was married to the late Donald King, a statistician and pioneer in information science, who died in 2019. She has one daughter and five stepdaughters.

== Books ==
- New Directions for Library and Information Science Education (1986)
- Perspectives in Information Management Vol. 1 (1990) co-written by Charles L. Citreon & Charles Oppenheim
- Final Report, Public Library Development Plan for Michigan 1990-1995 (1990) co-written by Donald W. King & King Research, Inc.
- A Manual on the Evaluation of Information Centers and Services (1991) co-written by Donald W. King
- Perspectives in Information Management Vol. 2 (1991) co-written by Charles L. Citreon & Charles Oppenheim
- The Use and Value of Special Libraries (1991) co-written Donald W. King
- Special Libraries: Increasing the Information Edge (1993) co-written by Donald W. King
- Cost-Finding for Records Management Activities: (A Guide to Unit Costing for the Records Manager) (1996) co-written by Donald W. King, edited by Elizabeth Atwood-Gailey
- A Strong Future for Public Library Use and Employment (2011) co-written by Donald W. Griffiths

== Awards ==
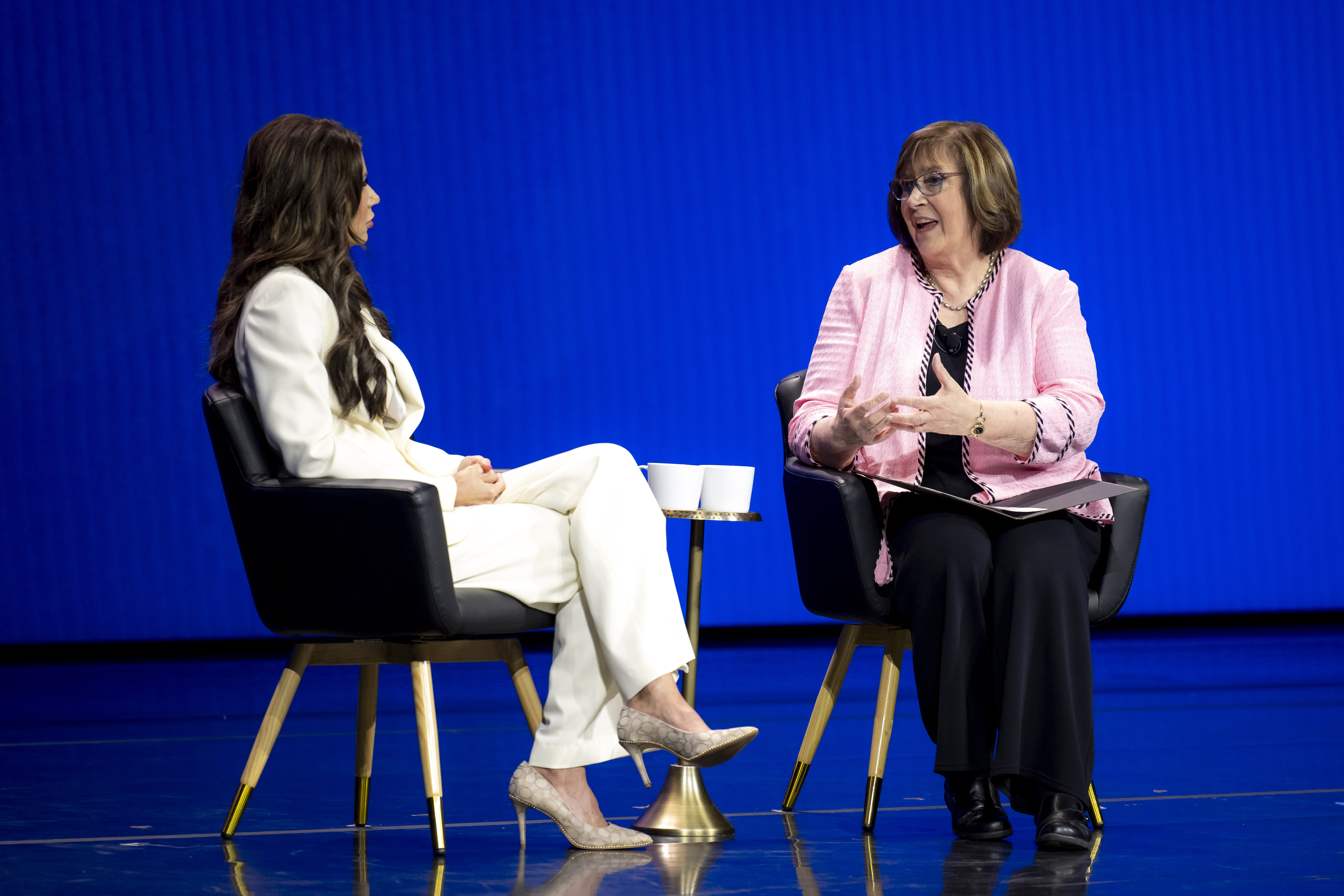
Griffiths (right) alongside Kristi Noem (left) at the 2025 RSAC Conference.

- Award of Merit, American Society for Information Science and Technology
- Research Award, American Society for Information Science and Technology
- Top 25 Women on the Web (WoW), 1999
- One of the 50 Influential Women in AI listed by InspiredMinds!
- Chief Executive Leadership Award for District VI, Council for Advancement and Support of Education, 2023
- South Dakota Hall of Fame in 2023
- Friend of SBS Award, 2023
- USA Today Women of the Year for South Dakota, 2024
