= Marjorie M.K. Hlava =

American information scientist

Marjorie M.K. Hlava is an American information scientist and the founder, former president, and chair of Access Innovations, Inc. She has served as president of the National Federation of Advanced Information Services (NFAIS) and the Association for Information Science and Technology (ASIS&T).

== Career ==
Hlava began her career working at NASA, where she stayed for 5 years, before going on to create her own company, Access Innovations, Inc.

A significant focus of Marjorie's career has been standards. She served on the National Information Standards Organization (NISO) board for 7 years and was a contributor to CRediT, NISO's taxonomy of contributor roles. In 2024, she led the revision of ISO 25964, an international standard for thesauri and interoperability between vocabularies.

Hlava is the author of more than 200 articles and several books on information science, and she holds three patents. Her professional work centers on content creation, information governance, and systems for information access, particularly in the areas of automated indexing, thesaurus and taxonomy development, natural language processing, machine translation, and machine-assisted indexing.

== Access Innovations ==
Hlava founded Access Innovations, Inc. in Albuquerque, New Mexico, in 1978. The company originally focused on building databases, a skill she had learned during her time working at NASA. In 1997, Access Innovations introduced Data Harmony, a semantic metadata software suite designed to support automated indexing, thesaurus and taxonomy management, and other information organization tools.

The company now specializes in information management and semantic solutions, with a focus on developing controlled vocabularies, taxonomies, and metadata systems and Access Innovations reports having created thousands of controlled vocabularies through more than 2,000 client projects.

== Awards ==
Hlava has received numerous professional honors, including the Watson Davis Award from ASIS&T in 1996, the ASIS&T Award of Merit in 2014, and the John Cotton Dana Award from the Special Libraries Association in 2015.
