= Herbert S. White =

American librarian (1927–2024)

- Born: July 5, 1927; Vienna, Austria
- Died: September 9, 2024 (aged 97)

Academic background
- Education: City College of New York; Syracuse University

Academic work
- Institutions: Indiana University; University of Arizona

Herbert Spencer White (July 5, 1927 – September 9, 2024) was an Austrian-born American librarian. He was Dean Emeritus and Distinguished Professor Emeritus at the School of Library and Information Science at Indiana University, and adjunct professor, University of Arizona, Tucson. He was honored with the Award of Merit - Association for Information Science and Technology and the American Library Association Melvil Dewey Award. He was a contributor to current theory and understanding of the role of the special library in contemporary American organizations.

== Life and career ==
White was born in Vienna, Austria, on July 5, 1927. He had a Bachelor of Science (Chemistry) and Masters of Library Science from Syracuse University.

He was Director of the NASA Scientific and Technical Information Facility, librarian at the Library of Congress and Atomic Energy Commission, program manager of the IBM Corporate Technical Information Center, and Vice President for Operations of the Institute for Scientific Information.

White was dean and professor from 1975-1991 at Indiana University School of Informatics Bloomington campus and distinguished Professor Emeritus after 1991.

White was the author of more than nine books and 200 articles on topics of library administration, supervision and library automation. He was a frequent speaker and presenter at seminars and workshops.

In retirement he continued adjunct teaching at the University of Arizona, writing and lecturing.

His "White Papers," a column published in Library Journal for more than a decade, was influential on current issues. Many of these popular columns were collected and republished in Librarianship Quo Vadis? (Libraries Unlimited: 2000).

White died on September 9, 2024, at the age of 97.

== Selected publications ==
- White Herbert S. (2000). Librarianship--Quo Vadis? : Opportunities and Dangers As We Face the New Millennium. Englewood Colo: Libraries Unlimited.
- White Herbert S. (1995). At the Crossroads : Librarians on the Information Superhighway. Englewood Colo: Libraries Unlimited.
- White Herbert S. (1993). “Rankings of Library and Information Science Faculty and Programs: The Third in a Series of Studies Undertaken at Six-Year Intervals.” Library Quarterly 166–87.
- White Herbert S. (1992). Ethical Dilemmas in Libraries: A Collection of Case Studies. New York Toronto New York: G.K. Hall ; Maxwell Macmillan Canada ; Maxwell Macmillan International.
- White, Herbert S. (1989). “The Danger of Political Polarization for Librarianship.” Library Journal 114 (11): 40–41.
- White Herbert S. (1989). Librarians and the Awakening from Innocence: A Collection of Papers. Boston Mass: G.K. Hall.
- White, Herbert S. (1987). “The Funding of Corporate Libraries—old Myths and New Problems.” Special Libraries 78 (July): 155–61.
- White Herbert S. (1984). Managing the Special Library: Strategies for Success Within the Larger Organization. White Plains NY: Knowledge Industry Publications.

== Awards and honors ==
- Festschrift in Honour of Herbert S. White. (1993).
- Awarded title of Distinguished Professor at Indiana University (1991).
- Melvil Dewey Medal by the American Library Association (1987).
- American Society for Information Science Award of Merit. (1981).
