= Marcia Lei Zeng =

Professor of Library and Information Science

- Born: Chinese: 曾蕾
- Other name: Zeng Lei
- Notable work: Metadata (with Jian Qin)

Marcia Lei Zeng (Chinese: 曾蕾) is a professor emerita of Information Science at the School of Information, Kent State University. She has written more than 100 articles and around six books on the various subjects within the field, from knowledge organization systems to metadata to digital humanities. In 2024, she was given the Award of Merit by Association for Information Science and Technology (ASIS&T).

== Education and career ==
Zeng has a B.A. (1982) and an M.A. (1984) in Library and Information Science from Wuhan University in China. In 1992, she received a Ph.D. in Information Science from the School of Computing and Information of the University of Pittsburgh.

Even before her Ph.D., Zeng taught as a lecturer at Wuhan University from 1985 to 1988. After gaining her doctorate, she worked in different positions at the University of Pittsburgh, from collection development in its East Asian Library to assisting in a LIS-related project. Then in 1992, she began teaching at Kent State University, first as an assistant professor and then rose through the ranks. She became a full professor in 2003.

While affiliated with Kent State, she worked in other cities in the US to other continents as well. From 1999 to 2000, she taught as a visiting associate professor at Columbia University in New York. Then later during the 2016 to 2017 school year, she visited Taiwan as a U.S. Fulbright Scholar.

=== Professional service ===
Sources:

- 2014–present: Standards Committee Member, Association for Information Science & Technology
- 2016 - 2020, 2020 - 2024: Member, Executive Board for the International Society for Knowledge Organization (ISKO)
- 2019 - 2021: Co-chair, Digital Humanities Curriculum Committee (iDHCC), iSchools Consortium
- September 2021 – present: Governing Board member, DCMI Governing Board
- 2021–present: Chair, DCMI Education Committee.
- Lead Guest Editor, Journal of the Association for Information Science and Technology (JASIST) and Special Issue on "Digital Humanities" (DH)

== Notable works ==
=== Books ===
- Subirats, I. & Zeng, M. L. (2020). Linked Open Data Enabled Bibliographical Data (LODE-BD) 3.0 – A practical guide on how to select appropriate encoding strategies for producing Linked Open Data Enabled Bibliographical Data. Food and Agriculture Organization (FAO) of the United Nations. doi:10.4060/cb2209en ISBN 978-9-25-133655-7
- Zeng, M.L., & Qin, J. (2022). Metadata, Chicago: ALA Neal-Schuman. ISBN 978-0-8389-4875-0

=== Papers ===
- Zeng, M. L. & Mayr, P. (2018). Knowledge organization systems (KOS) in the semantic web. International Journal on Digital Libraries. doi:10.1007/s00799-018-0241-2 Online version 2018.05 https://rdcu.be/PgZW
- Zeng, M. L. (2019). Semantic enrichment for enhancing LAM data and supporting digital humanities. El profesional de la información, 28(1), e280103. doi:10.3145/epi.2019.ene.03
- Zeng, M. L. & Clunis, J. (2020). FAIR + FIT: Guiding principles and functional metrics for linked open data (LOD) KOS products. Journal of Data and Information Science (JDIS), 5(1), 93-118. doi:10.2478/jdis-2020-0008
- Zeng, M. L., Hong, Y., Clunis, J., He, S., & Coladangelo, L. P. (2020, June 24). Implications of knowledge organization systems for health information exchange and communication during the COVID-19 Pandemic. Information Management, 4(3), 148–170. doi:10.2478/dim-2020-0009

== Awards and honors ==
Sources:

- 2015 - 2016: U.S. Fulbright Scholar to Taiwan
- 2016: President’s Faculty Excellence Award, Kent State University
- 2017: CHOICE Outstanding Academic Title, Zeng, M, L. & Qin, J. (2016). Metadata (2nd ed.). ALA Neal-Schuman. Facet Publishing. ISBN 978-1-78330-052-5 Companion Website: http://metadataetc.org/book-website2nd/
- 1–7 September 2019: Best Poster Award, CIDOC International Council of Museums (ICOM) 25th General Conference. Kyoto, Japan.
- 2019 - 2021: Linked Conservation Data, (as a member of the Consortium), funded by UKRI Arts & Humanities Research Council
- ASIS&T Distinguished Member, Inaugural Class of 2021
- 2024: ASIS&T Award of Merit, recognizing sustained contributions to and/or achievements in the field of information science and/or the professions in which it is practiced.
