= Award of Merit - Association for Information Science and Technology =

The Award of Merit is bestowed by the Association for Information Science and Technology. It is an annual prize to an individual for a lifetime of achievement that recognizes sustained contributions to and/or achievements in the field of information science and/or the professions in which it is practiced. The Award of Merit was first given in 1964 to Hans Peter Luhn.

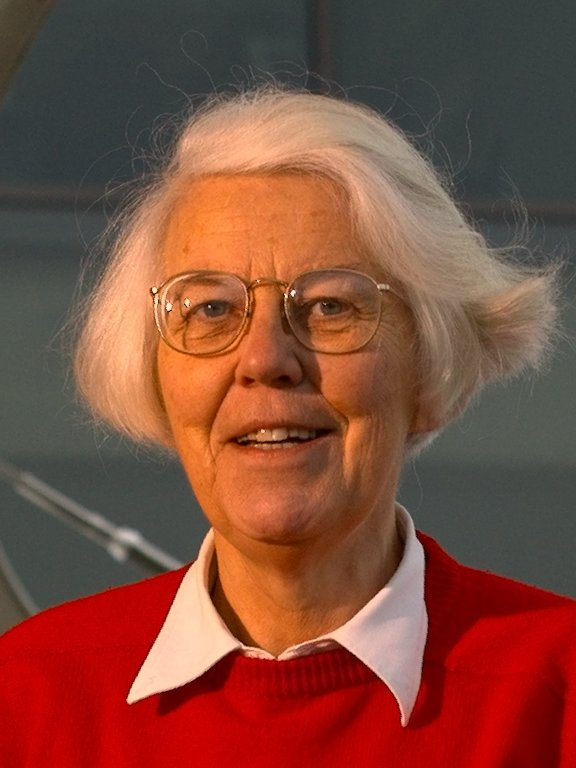
Karen Spärck Jones-2002

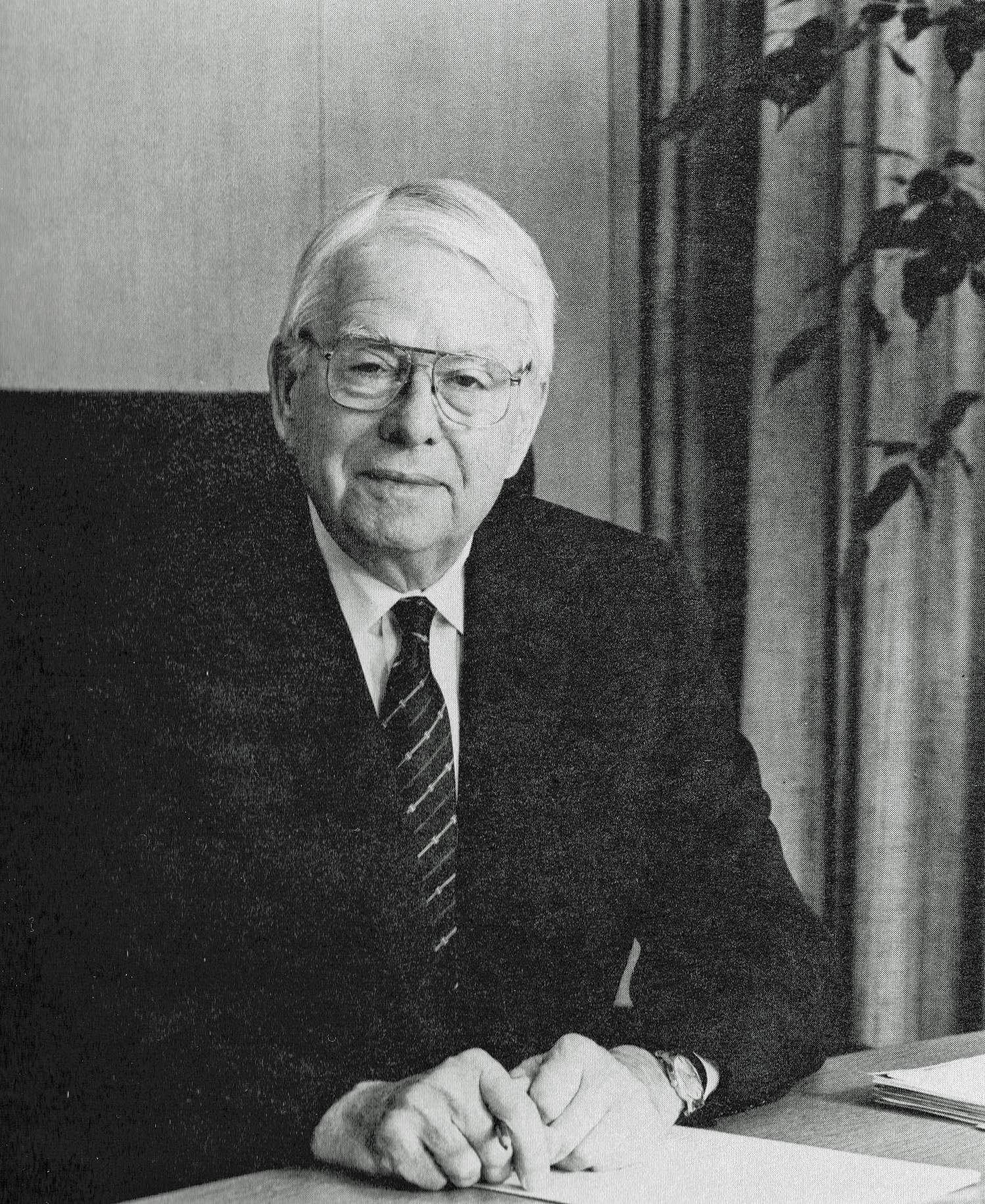
Frederick G. Kilgour-1979

Eugene Garfield- 1975

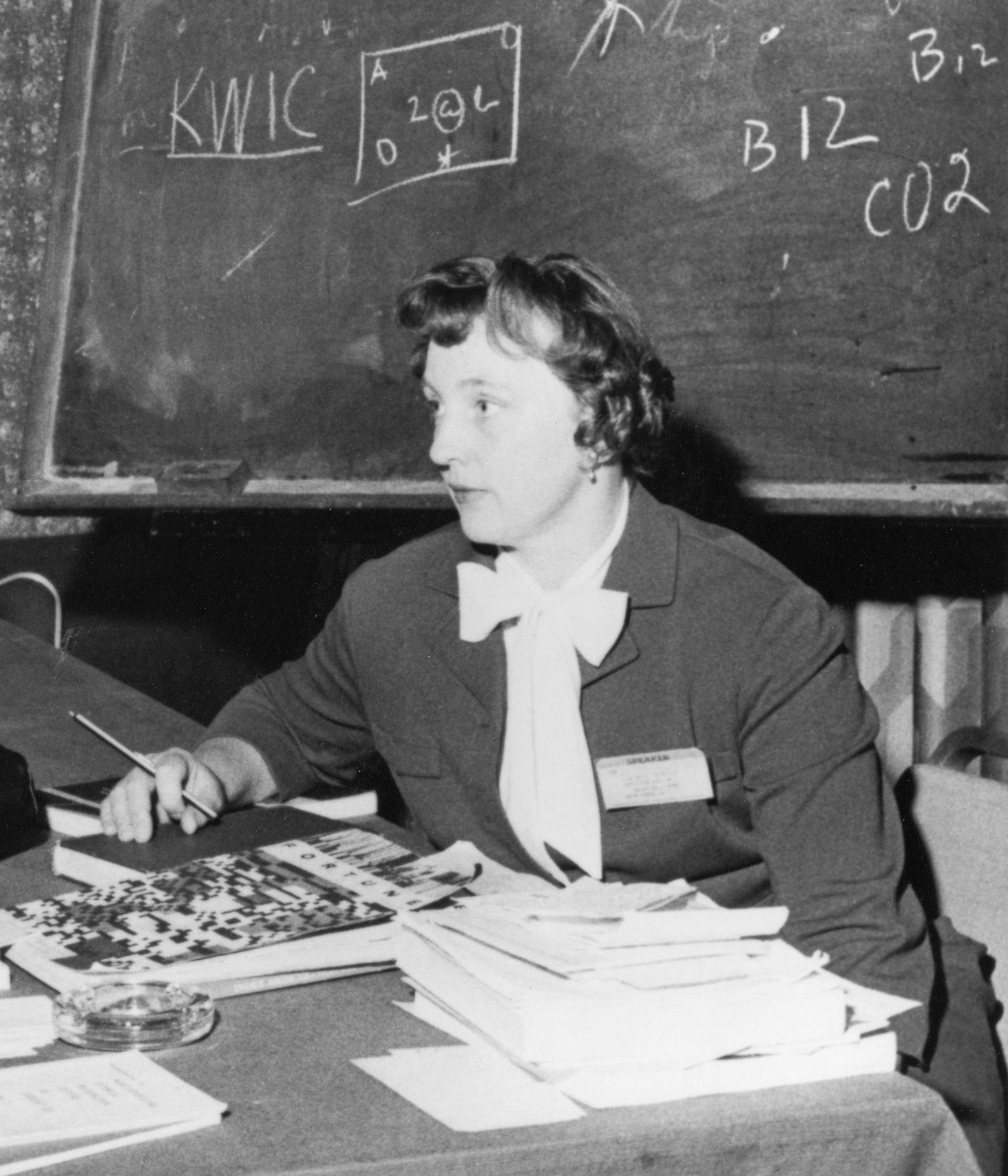
Claire Kelly Schultz-1980

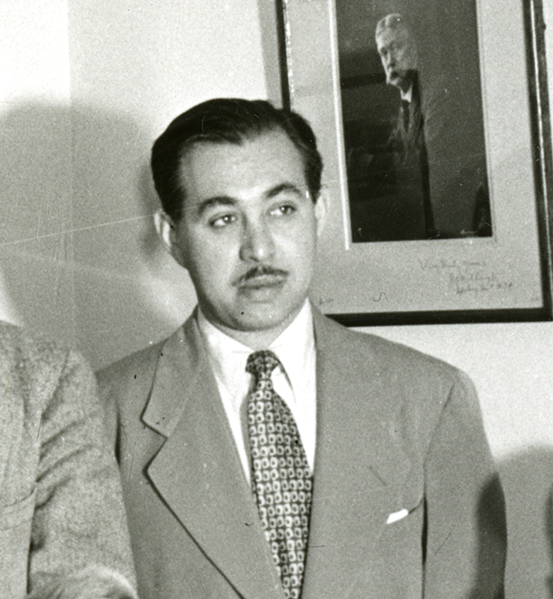
Mortimer Taube -1966

| Name | Date | Major accomplishments |
|---|---|---|
| Heidi Julien | 2025 | |
| Marcia Lei Zeng | 2024 | Professor of Information Science at Kent State University |
| Andrew Dillon | 2023 | V.M. Daniel Professor of Information in the School of Information, University of Texas at Austin. |
| Harry Bruce | 2022 | Dean, University of Washington Information School |
| Steve Sawyer | 2021 | Editor-in-Chief, Journal of the Association for Information Science and Technology. |
| Diane H. Sonnenwald | 2020 | Theory Development in the Information Sciences. |
| Christine Borgman | 2019 | Big Data, Little Data, No Data: Scholarship in the Networked World |
| Toni Carbo | 2018 | Executive Director, National Commission on Libraries and Information Science (NCLIS) |
| Thomas D. Wilson | 2017 | "Fifty Years of Information Behaviour Research." |
| Peter Ingwersen | 2016 | The Turn - Integration of Information Seeking and Retrieval in Context. |
| Michael E.D. Koenig | 2015 | Knowledge Management (Km) Processes in Organizations: Theoretical Foundations and Practice. |
| Marjorie M.K. Hlava | 2014 | President, Access Innovations. |
| Carol C. Kuhlthau | 2013 | Guided Inquiry : Learning in the 21st Century. |
| Michael Buckland | 2012 | Information and Society. |
| Gary Marchionini | 2011 | Information Concepts: From Books to Cyberspace Identities. |
| Linda C. Smith | 2010 | Library and Information Science, Interdisciplinary Perspectives: A Festschrift in Honor of Linda C. Smith. |
| Carol Tenopir | 2009 | Communication Patterns of Engineers. |
| Clifford Lynch | 2008 | Director of the Coalition for Networked Information. |
| Donald H. Kraft | 2007 | Operations Research for Libraries and Information Agencies; editor Journal of the Association for Information Science and Technology for 24 years. |
| Blaise Cronin | 2006 | Dean of the School of Library and Information Science, Indiana University. |
| Marcia Bates | 2005 | Encyclopedia of Library and Information Sciences |
| Howard D. White | 2004 | “Combining Bibliometrics Information Retrieval and Relevance Theory." |
| Nicholas J. Belkin | 2003 | Interaction in Information Systems: A Review of Research from Document Retrieval to Knowledge-Based Systems. |
| Karen Spärck Jones | 2002 | "A Statistical Interpretation of Term Specificity and Its Application in Retrieval." |
| Patrick G. Wilson | 2001 | Two Kinds of Power; an Essay on Bibliographical Control. |
| Donald R. Swanson | 2000 | Swanson Linking; Dean of the University of Chicago Graduate Library School. |
| José-Marie Griffiths | 1999 | V.P., board directors, King Research, Inc. |
| Henry Small | 1998 | Institute for Scientific Information; Bibliometrics of Basic Research. "Macrolevel changes in the structure of co-citation clusters." |
| Dagobert Soergel | 1997 | Best Information Science Book of the Year-1987-Organizing Information: Principles of Data Base and Retrieval Systems. |
| Jean Tague-Sutcliffe | 1996 | Measuring Information: An Information Services Perspective. |
| Tefko Saracevic | 1995 | “A Study of Information Seeking and Retrieving. III. Searchers Searches and Overlap.” Editor-in Chief Information Processing & Management (1985-2008). |
| Harold Borko | 1994 | "Artificial intelligence and expert systems research and their possible impact on information." American Society for Information Science, president 1966. |
| Robert M. Hayes | 1993 | Handbook of Data Processing for Libraries. |
| Robert Saxton Taylor | 1992 | The Making of a Library; the Academic Library in Transition.“Value-Added Processes in the Information Life Cycle.” |
| Roger K. Summit | 1991 | Founder of Dialog Information Services, "father of modern online searching." |
| Pauline Atherton Cochrane | 1990 | Papers in Honor of Pauline Atherton Cochrane. One of the most highly cited authors in the field of library and information sciences. |
| Gerard Salton | 1989 | Dynamic Information and Library Processing.ACM Fellow. |
| F. Wilfrid Lancaster | 1988 | Toward Paperless Information Systems.; Most cited in 1970s- 1990s. |
| Donald W. King | 1987 | President of ASIS; Key Papers in the Economics of Information. |
| Bernard M. Fry | 1986 | Founding editor, Government Publications Review; Festschrift;Government Publications: Their Role in the National Program for Library and Information Services. |
| Robert L. Chartrand | 1985 | "Computer Technology and the Congress." |
| Joseph Becker and Martha E. Williams | 1984 | Becker, “Communications Networks for Libraries.” and Williams,“Education and Training for Online Use of Data Bases.” |
| Dale B.Baker | 1983 | Director of Chemical Abstracts. |
| Andrew A. Aines | 1982 | Director of COSATI |
| Herbert S. White | 1981 | Festschrift in Honour of Herbert S. White |
| Claire Kelly Schultz | 1980 | President of the American Documentation Institute, 1962."Claire Kelly Schultz (1924-2015)." |
| Frederick Kilgour | 1979 | President of OCLC; Legion of Merit for intelligence work during World War II, “History of Library Computerization.”,American Library Association Honorary Membership. |
| Calvin Mooers | 1978 | Coined the term "information retrieval." "A Pioneer Of Information Retrieval." |
| Allen Kent | 1977 | Best Information Science Book of the Year- 1979-The Structure and Governance of Library Networks.; Encyclopedia of Library and Information Science. |
| Laurence Heilprin | 1976 | "Laurence B. Heilprin, 1906-1993. |
| Eugene Garfield | 1975 | Founder of bibliometrics and scientometrics and Science Citation Index; A Festschrift in Honor of Eugene Garfield. |
| Manfred Kochen | 1974 | Founding Editor of Human Systems Management. |
| Jesse Shera | 1973 | Documentation and the organization of knowledge;American Library Association Honorary Membership Papers in honor of Jesse Hauk Shera. |
| Phyllis Richmond | 1972 | ‘‘Hierarchical Definition;’’"The Art and Science of Classification: Phyllis Allen Richmond, 1921–1997." |
| Jerrold Orne | 1971 | Chaired Z39 Committee, precursor to National Information Standards Organization, Director University of North Carolina at Chapel Hill libraries and professor of Library Science at the University of North Carolina at Chapel Hill. |
| Cyril W. Cleverdon | 1970 | Cranfield Experiments; "Cyril W. Cleverdon." |
| No Award | 1969 | |
| Carlos Cuadra | 1968 | Best Information Science Book Award-1969- for Annual Review of Information Science and Technology; “Role of the Private Sector in the Development and Improvement of Library and Information Services." |
| Robert Fairthorne | 1967 | "Robert Fairthorne and the Scope of Information Science."“Robert A. Fairthorne, a Biographical Sketch.” |
| Mortimer Taube | 1966 | “Theoretical Principles of Information Organization in Librarianship.” "On the Shoulder of Giants." |
| Charles P. Bourne | 1965 | “Cost Analysis and Simulation Procedures for the Evaluation of Large Information Systems.” |
| Hans Peter Luhn | 1964 | Luhn algorithm; H.P. Luhn: Pioneer of Information Science. |
