= Carol Tenopir =

Information sciences researcher

- Born: Whittier, California
- Occupation: Professor of Information Science
- Years active: 1976-2021
- Employer: University of Tennessee-Knoxville
- Known for: Information science research and publication
- Awards: 2012: American Association for the Advancement of Science Information, Computing, and Communication Fellows[19] 2010: University of Illinois Graduate School of Library and Information Science Outstanding Alumnus Award[1] 2009: American Society for Information Science Award of Merit[20] 2004: International Information Industry Lifetime Achievement Award[1]

Carol Tenopir (born 1952) is a researcher in information sciences, focusing on information access and retrieval, electronic publishing, scholarly communication and the information industry. She was a Chancellor's Professor and Director at the University of Tennessee-Knoxville for 27 years, publishing 5 books and over 200 articles. She also the author of Library Journal's "Online Databases" column for 28 years.

== Career ==
Tenopir was born and raised in Whittier, California, where received her Bachelors of Arts with majors in English and History from Whitter College in 1974. Tenopir received her Masters of Library Science in 1976 from California State University, Fullerton. She then began work for an information consulting firm in southern California before becoming an automation librarian for the University of Hawai'i at Mānoa in 1976. During this time, Tenopir also began writing the "Online Databases" article for Library Journal, which she continued for 28 years. She received her PhD in Library and Information Sciences from the University of Illinois at Champaign-Urbana in 1984. After getting her PhD, Tenopir was rehired by the University of Hawai'i as an assistant professor in the School of Library and Information Science. She began teaching distance courses via television to satellite campuses of the university.

Tenopir began her career at the University of Tennessee - Knoxville in 1994. She also taught distance learning courses at the University of Tennessee, first through television then over the Internet. At the University of Tennessee, Tenopir was a Chancellor's Professor as well as the Director of Research for the College of Communication and Information and the Director of the Center for Information and Communication Studies. Tenopir was also selected as a Fulbright Scholar three times during her tenure at the University of Tennessee. She was a Fulbright Specialist at the University of Oulu in 2005 and at Tempere University in 2015. She was also selected as the Fulbright-Nokia Distinguished Chair in Information and Communications Technology at the Hanken School of Economics in 2016. At the time of her appointment, Tenopir was only one of eight researchers to be awarded the chair and the first woman. Tenopir retired from the University of Tennessee in 2021.

== Research and publication ==
During her career, Tenopir focused on information access and retrieval, electronic publishing, scholarly communication, and the information industry. In 1988, Tenopir published Managing Your Information: How to Design & Create a Textual Database on Your Microcomputer with Gerald Lundeen. The book was a practical guide to creating a textual database from start to finish for internal library or organization use. In 1990, Tenopir was selected as the first title in the Database Searching Series published by Libraries Unlimited. Her book, Issues in Online Database Searching was a collection of her "Online Databases" articles with other of her published articles. The book evaluated the efficacy of search strategies in online databases with analysis and evaluation of the online databases themselves. In 1995, Tenopir was awarded the Special Libraries Association's Steven L. Goldspiel Research Grant for her proposal to study the impact of electronic publishing on special libraries. Her study focused on the electronic journal publishing and distribution systems and their effects on special libraries and researcher choice with regard to paper vs electronic journals. Tenopir's electronic publishing research foresaw the transition of researchers from print to electronic and digital materials. Tenopir argued that electronic journals and digital publishing could lower costs, speed up the publishing process, and increase access to scholarly research.

Tenopir was awarded another grant in 2001, this time from the National Science Foundation, to create the NSDL, the National Science Digital Library, designed to make available high-quality teaching materials in science, technology, engineering, and math. Tenopir's research often focused on the sciences, including engineering. In 2004, she published the book Communication Patterns of Engineers with Donald King. In the book, Tenopir and King provide a meta-analysis of engineering communication patterns concluding that an increase in communication correlates to an increase in engineering productivity. The study tracked 715 scientific journals and included 15,000 participants over a 40-year period.

Tenopir delivered the Miles Conrad Award Lecture at the annual National Federation of Advanced Information Scientists meeting in 2006, outlining her theory that libraries build bridges between information and information seekers. Libraries should understand the information seeking habits of their users, and they should build on-ramps to information. Libraries must also recognize that the bridges they build will never be big enough to satisfy library users.

In 2012, Tenopir, again with Donald King, published the results of an almost 35 year longitudinal study of researchers' academic journal reading habits. The study found that for the first time since 2005, reading of scholarly articles by the researchers in the study had not increased. The study also found that researchers tend to spend about 30 minutes reading per article and that over half of researchers read their articles digitally. In 2013, she participated in another National Science Foundation project called DataONE. The project surveyed over 1300 scientists about their data sharing habits with a goal of identifying barriers to information access. In 2020, Tenopir was award a $399,000 grant from the Alfred P. Sloan Foundation to study the international consequences of COVID-19 pandemic measures on early researchers' scholarly communication practices. This grant was a continuation of a four-year longitudinal study with fellow researcher Dave Nicholas on scholarly communication practices in the natural and social sciences.

In 2024, scienceOS, an AI research agent for scientists developed in Germany, released the Tenopir Update which allows users to add PDFs in their chat with the AI. The update is dedicated to Tenopir in honor of her work in understanding the academic role and use of electronic resources and digital information.

== Awards ==
- 2012: American Association for the Advancement of Science Information, Computing, and Communication Fellows
- 2010: University of Illinois Graduate School of Library and Information Science Outstanding Alumnus Award
- 2009: American Society for Information Science Award of Merit
- 2004: International Information Industry Lifetime Achievement Award
- 2002: American Society for Information Science Research Award
- 2000: American Association of Library Science Education Award for Teaching Excellence
- 1993: American Society for Information Science Outstanding information Science Teacher Award
