= Carlos Cuadra =

American computer scientist and filmmaker

Carlos Albert Cuadra (December 21, 1925 – August 31, 2022) was an American computer scientist and documentary filmmaker. He was a pioneer in the creation of online databases and was honored with the Award of Merit from the Association for Information Science and Technology.

Carlos Cuadra was born in San Francisco, California (US). He dropped out of high school to join the U.S. Navy during World War II in 1944. He left the Navy two years later (1946) with a diploma in Morse code, which allowed him to enter the University of California, Berkeley. He studied clinical psychology and received his doctorate in this subject in 1953, working for a few years at the mental health center of that university and in other similar centers in the United States. During these years, Cuadra applied his programming knowledge to the treatment of medical information.

In 1956 Cuadra joined the RAND Corporation, which worked with the Massachusetts Institute of Technology on the creation of an air defense system. He works in departments of first-time document databases with basic information for the industry. From these efforts, System Development Corporation, better known by its acronym SDC, was born, a specialized center for online information. There, Cuadra began to create software applied to the field of Information and Documentation.

Cuadra developed software for the National Library of Medicine.

In 1972, he founded ORBIT, the first commercial online host, which was followed by four more editions.

Carlos Cuadra left SDC in 1978 to found, Cuadra Associates, where he created the Directory of Online Databases (DOD) resource, an online database directory. Its first page consisted of a table detailing the evolution of the number of databases, producers, hosts and gateways with data from previous editions.

He then created the Directory of Portable Databases, a directory with information about databases on CD-ROMs, tapes, and floppy disks.

In addition to his work as a programmer and distributor of documentary information products, Cuadra was also an editor. He founded the Annual Review of Information Science and Technology (ARIST) in 1966 which he edited until 1975. ARIST is an annual collection of peer-reviewed, comprehensive, and systematic reviews on topics relevant to information science, computing science, technology studies, and related fields. The third edition was awarded the Best Book published in 1969 by the Association for Information Science and Technology.

Carlos Cuadra was awarded the Award of Merit in 1968 by the Association for Information Science and Technology—its highest award.
