= Heidi Julien =

Canadian information scientist

Heidi Julien is a Canadian information science professor and scholar whose research focuses on human information behavior, information literacy, and theory used in information science. She is currently a professor at the University of Buffalo. Julien focuses on digital literacy, information literacy, information behavior, and research methodologies in library and information science.

She is the recipient of the 2025 Award of Merit from the Association for Information Science and Technology--the association’s highest honor.

== Early life and education ==
Very little public information is available about Julien's early life. She has earned a Bachelor of Education in 1984 and a Master of Library and Information Studies from the University of Alberta in 1994. She completed her PhD in Library and Information Science at the University of Western Ontario in 1997. Her dissertation was titled "How Does Information Help? The Search for Career-Related Information by Adolescents", her supervisor was Gillian Michell.

== Career ==
Julien has held major leadership roles in information societies and conferences, including President of the Association for Library and Information Science Education (ALISE) 2018-2019, President of the Canadian Association for Information Science 2015-2016, and several other organizations as well. She has also held multiple chair, and jury positions within ASIS&T (Awards & Honors Committee; Governance Committee; Award of Merit juries).

She teaches graduate-level courses in theoretical foundations of information science, information practices, information literacy instruction, and research methods. She has supervised numerous doctoral and master's students to completion, and served on several different doctoral examination committees internationally. Julien is recognized for her sustained graduate student mentorship and commitment to the work in library and information studies.

Posts have included:

- Professor, Department of Information Science, Graduate School of Education, University of Buffalo (2013–present), Department Chair 2013-2019.
- Research Associate, Department of Information Science, University of Pretoria (2020-2024).
- Adjunct Professor, Faculty of Graduate Studies, Dalhousie University (2021-2024).
- Professor and Director, School of Library and Information Studies, University of Alabama (2011-2013).
- Professor, Graduate Coordinator, Associate and Assistant Professor roles, School of Library and Information Studies, University of Alberta (2001-2011l; Associate Professor 2004-2009; Professor 2009-2011).

== Partnerships ==
In partnership with the University of Alberta Faculty of Graduate & Postgraduate studies, Julien has created an award of $500 that gets awarded to two Library and Information Students. The award is the 'Dr Heidi Julien Professional Development Award in Library and Information Studies'.

== Awards ==
- ASIS&T Award of Merit (2025).
- Canadian Association for Information Science Career Achievement Award (inaugural, 2023).
- University at Buffalo Exceptional Scholar - Sustained Achievement (2023).
- ASIS&T SIG-USE Outstanding Contributions to Information Behavior Research Award (2020).
- ALISE Service Award (2021).
- Library and Information Studies Graduate Student Supervisor Award – University of Alberta – 2010.

== Selected publications ==
- Julien, Heidi; Barker, Susan (January 2009). "How high-school students find and evaluate scientific information: A basis for information literacy skills development". Library & Information Science Research. 31 (1): 12–17. doi:10.1016/j.lisr.2008.10.008. hdl:10818/9358.
- Fisher, Karen E.; Julien, Heidi (2009). "Information behavior". Annual Review of Information Science and Technology. 43 (1): 1–73. doi:10.1002/aris.2009.1440430114. ISSN 1550-8382.
- Aharony, Noa; Julien, Heidi; Nadel-Kritz, Noa (2020-12-01). "Survey of information literacy instructional practices in academic libraries". Journal of Librarianship and Information Science. 52 (4): 964–971. doi:10.1177/0961000619891762. ISSN 0961-0006.
- Detlor, Brian; Booker, Lorne; Serenko, Alexander; Julien, Heidi (2012-05-01). "Student perceptions of information literacy instruction: The importance of active learning". Education for Information. 29 (2): 147–161. doi:10.3233/EFI-2012-0924. ISSN 0167-8329.
- Detlor, Brian; Julien, Heidi; La Rose, Tara; Serenko, Alexander (October 2022). "Community-led digital literacy training: Toward a conceptual framework". Journal of the Association for Information Science and Technology. 73 (10): 1387–1400. doi:10.1002/asi.24639. ISSN 2330-1635.
- Detlor, Brian; Serenko, Alexander; Rose, Tara La; Julien, Heidi (2024-09-16). "A Survey of Public Library-Led Digital Literacy Training in Canada: Perceptions of Administrators and Instructors". Evidence Based Library and Information Practice. 19 (3): 23–41. doi:10.18438/eblip30553. ISSN 1715-720X.
