= Robert L. Chartrand =

Information management professional

Robert Lee Chartrand (6 March 1928 – 26 December 2010) was an information management professional, author, and public speaker.

== Early life and education ==
Chartrand was born on March 6, 1928, in Kansas City, Missouri. He received a Master of Arts in history and government from the University of Missouri at Kansas City before performing doctoral work at Louisiana State University.

== Career ==
A US Naval Intelligence Officer and Korean War veteran, Chartrand entered the computer industry after working for the Central Intelligence Agency. Chartrand held positions with TRW, IBM, and PRC before working with the Congressional Research Service of the Library of Congress. Notably, Chartrand acted as a specialist in information sciences while working for the Science Policy Research Division of the Congressional Research Service and authored a number of early reports and publications on computers and information technology, especially in regard to their use in government.

== Honors and awards ==
Chartrand also served on the Awards Committee of the Interagency Committee on Automatic Data Processing, which recognized government employees who made significant contributions to information science. Chartrand himself was the recipient of the 1984 University of Missouri-Kansas City Alumni Award and the 1985 Association for Information Science and Technology (ASIS&T) Award of Merit.

== Personal life ==
Chartrand was married twice. The first, to Betty Ruth Bogue, resulted in a divorce in 1967. Chartrand and Bogue had two children, K.C. Chartrand and Leslie Chartrand-Selman. Also in 1967, Chartrand married Eleanor Salmon Hodges. Chartrand and Hodges remained married until her death in 2008.
