= Claire Kelly Schultz =

American documentalist

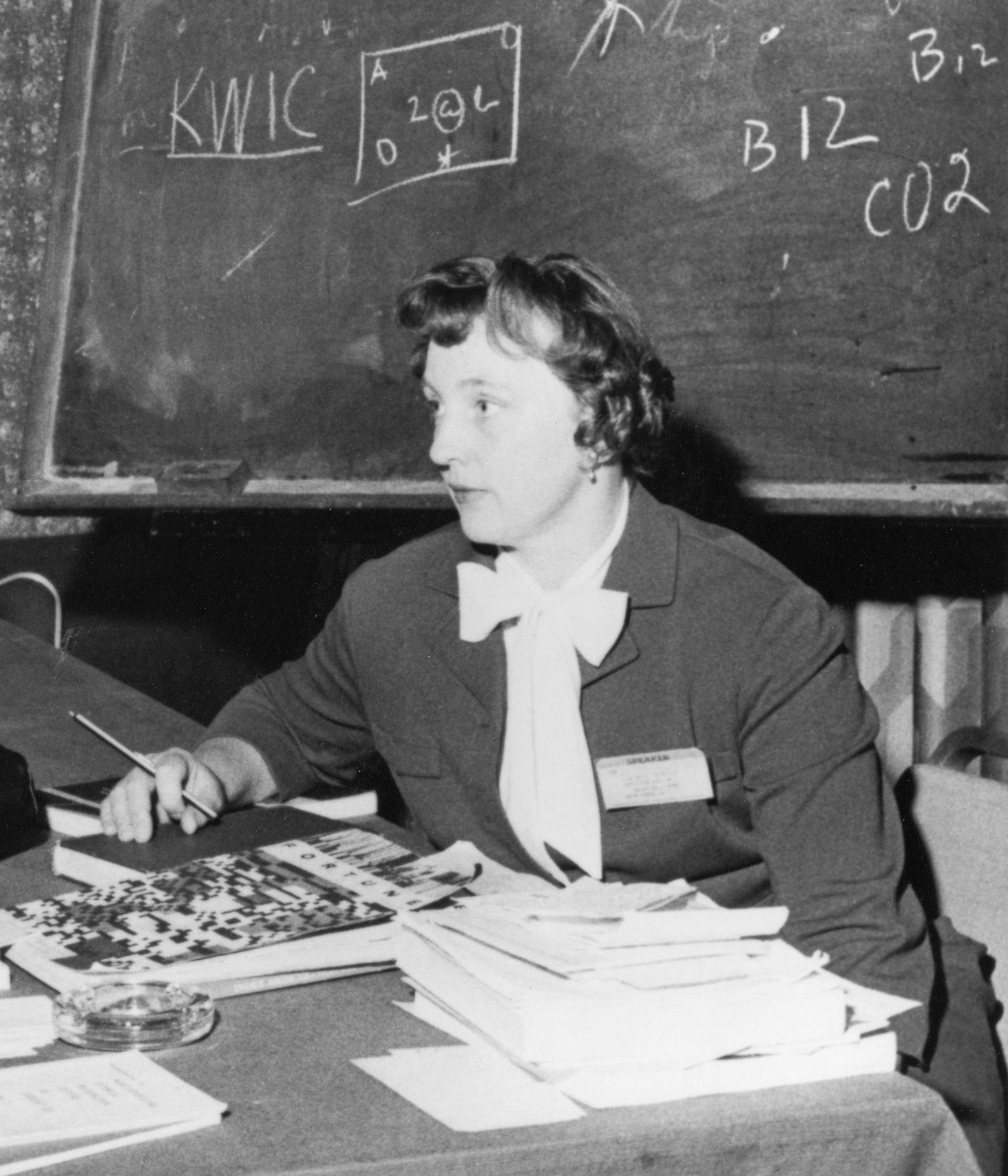
- Born: November 17, 1924; Etters, Pennsylvania, U.S.A.
- Died: May 28, 2015 (aged 90); Line Lexington, Pennsylvania, U.S.
- Education: Juniata College, Drexel Institute
- Spouse: Wallace L. Schultz
- Awards: ASIS Award of merit, 1980
- Scientific career
- Fields: Information science
- Workplaces: Merck, Sharp and Dohme; Institute for Advancement of Medical Communications

Claire Kelly Schultz (November 17, 1924 - May 28, 2015) was an American computer consultant and academic. She was a leading figure in the early development of automated information retrieval systems and information science. A "documentalist", she was particularly known for her work in thesaurus construction and machine-aided indexing, innovating techniques for punch card information retrieval.

While working as a librarian at the Merck, Sharp and Dohme chemical company she "developed a machine-sorted card system that employed Boolean retrieval logic. Her first use of punched cards in 1949 used the Mooers Zator system." This has been seen as a "transitional role of such punched-card systems toward later use of computers for information retrieval".

== Early life and education ==
Claire Kelly was born on November 17, 1924, in Etters, Pennsylvania, to Joseph and Mary (Ross) Kelly. She went to a one-room school, completing 8th grade by age 12. At age 13, her family moved to a farm near Linglestown, Pennsylvania. Claire looked after the housework and livestock as well as attending school. At fifteen, she worked as governess and cook for another family, to earn money for college.

At age 16, she completed high school and attended Juniata College, receiving a four-year scholarship for tuition, and working for a German family for room and board. She obtained her B.S. in chemistry and biology with a minor in mathematics, a pre-med major, in 1944, at age 19.

Claire wanted to become a doctor, and applied at the Woman’s Medical College of Pennsylvania, but was initially refused because of her age. She spent the next year working as an attendant at the Philadelphia State Hospital at Byberry as part of a Quaker program for the humane treatment of mental patients. At Byberry, she met her future husband, Wallace L. Schultz, a conscientious objector who also worked as an attendant. They married in June 1945.

Claire was then accepted at the Woman’s Medical College of Pennsylvania, which she attended from 1945-46. Soon after starting medical school she became pregnant with her first child. When the school became aware that she was married and pregnant, the dean was outraged and ordered her to leave. After the baby was born, the couple returned to Philadelphia, where Wallace studied English Literature. During much of their marriage, Claire was the primary breadwinner for the family, while Wallace took responsibility for parenting and running their home.

== Career ==
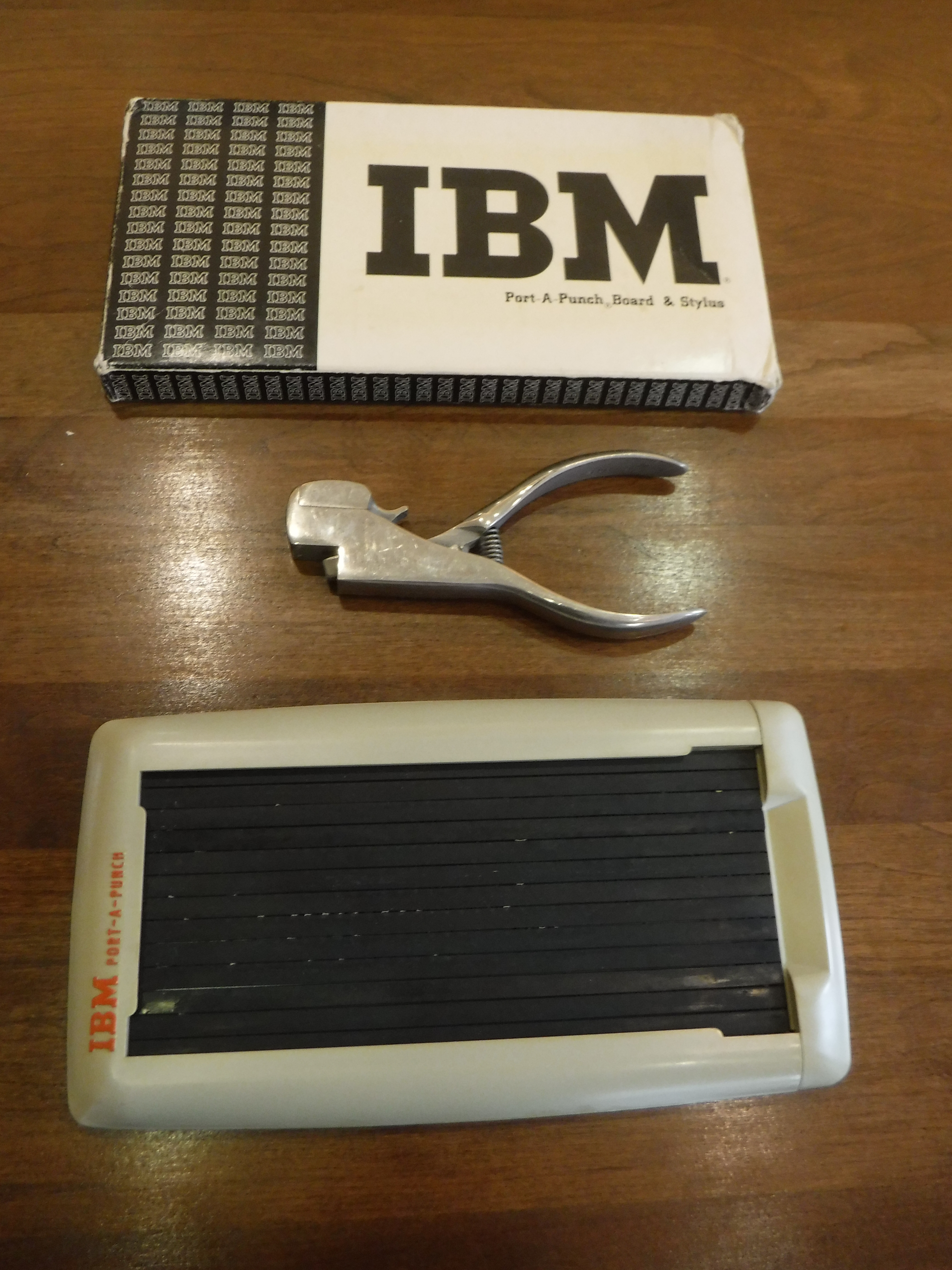
IBM card punch, Claire Schultz collection, Science History Institute

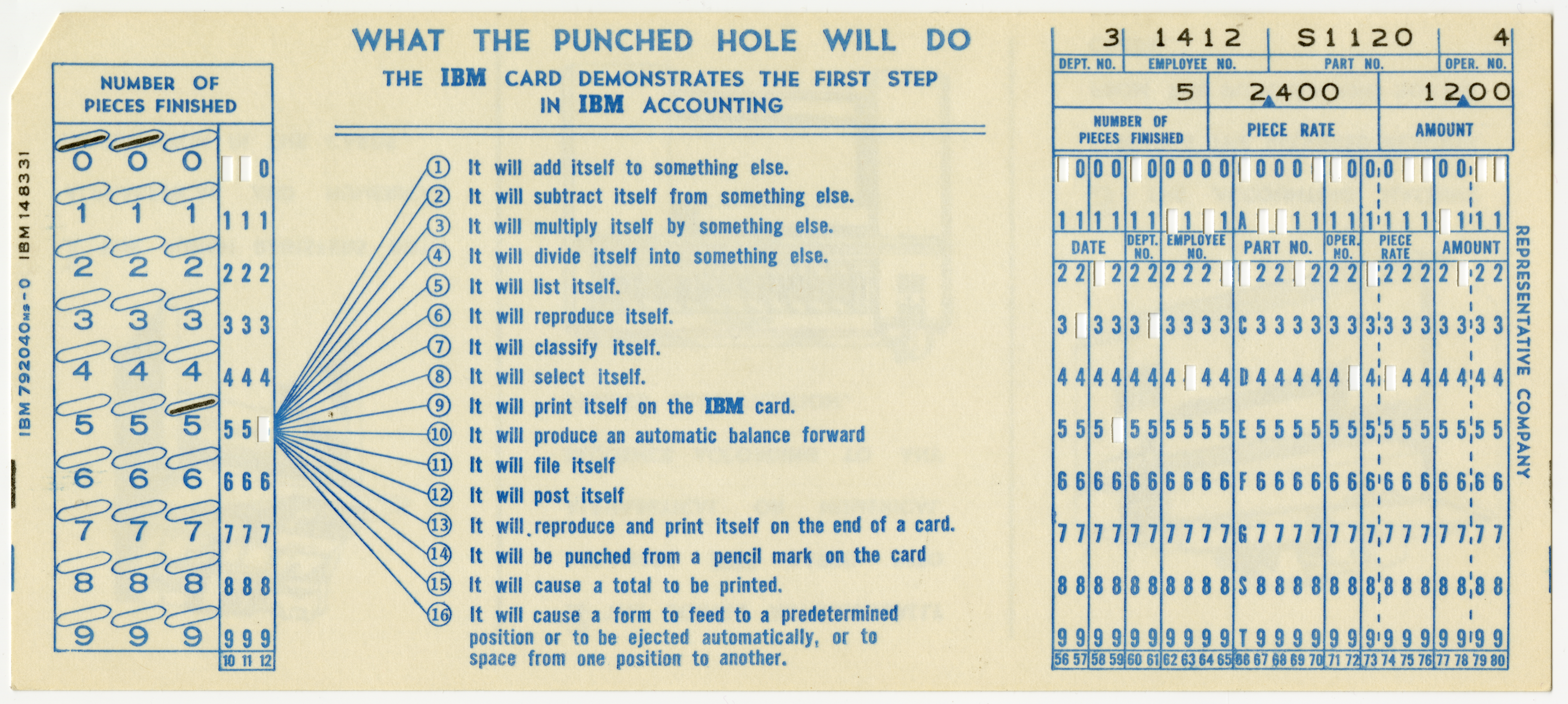
IBM punch card, recto, Claire Schultz collection, Science History Institute

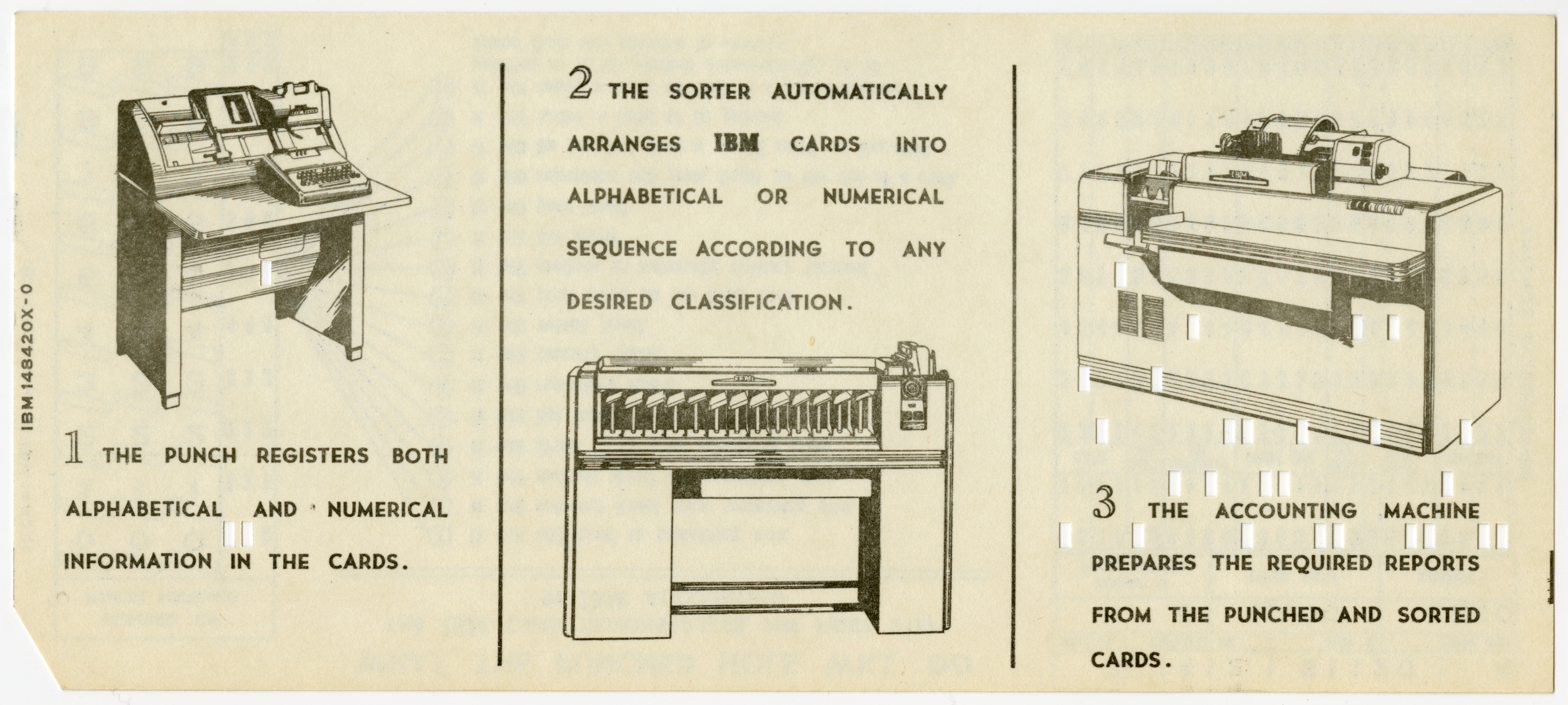
IBM punch card, verso, Claire Schultz collection, Science History Institute

During Schultz's career she worked as a computer consultant, a librarian, a researcher, and a professor. From 1946 to 1948, Claire worked at the Wistar Institute of Anatomy and Biology. Initially hired as a librarian, she soon became a laboratory assistant to Dr. Edmond J. Farris, studying human reproduction and fertility.

In 1948, she found a higher-paying job as a librarian at Sharp & Dohme in Glenolden, Pennsylvania (later Merck, Sharp & Dohme). While there, she was introduced to Calvin Mooers, an advocate of the Zator indexing system. Influenced by Mooers' ideas, Schultz compiled a "subject dictionary" to index the terminology used in scientific journals and by the Sharp and Dohme scientists. She and Robert Ford experimented with searching techniques and the use of the Remington Rand sorter and boolean logic. Then they convinced the company that the IBM 101 (which in 1950 was used only at the Census Bureau) could be adapted to do punch card searches with "and, or, and not" connectives, and arranged to rent one. They used the National Research Council's Chemical-Biological Coordination Center method of coding for chemical names.

Claire Schultz also studied library science on weekends and evenings at Drexel University. With the support of Margaret Kehl, she was able to present her library sorting work as her thesis. She obtained her M.S. in library science in 1952. John Mauchly sought her out at a conference, and after visiting Merck for a demonstration of her use of the IBM, offered her a job whenever she wanted one. She continued to work at Merck Research Laboratories until 1957.

In 1957, Schultz left Merck to join John Mauchly at Sperry Rand Univac Corporation. She was in her fourth month of pregnancy, and the Univac's insurers refused to allow her on site while she was pregnant. During the interim, she worked on bibliographic projects such as Current Contents with Eugene Garfield. Once her child was born, she joined Sperry Rand, where she worked on information retrieval research from 1958 to 1961.

In the early 1960s, Schultz was involved in the automation of the Armed Services Technical Information Agency (ASTIA). She was also involved in developing systems specifications for the MEDLARS/MEDLINE system of the National Library of Medicine.

From 1961 to 1970 she worked for the Institute for the Advancement of Medical Communication. She also taught afternoon and evening classes and counseled graduate students at Drexel University. She taught the first class to be offered at Drexel in "documentation", under the title "Search strategy", in the summer of 1962. She is credited with organizing Drexel's information science program, launched in 1963 by Dean John F. Harvey.

In 1962, she served as the first female president of the American Documentation Institute (now the Association for Information Science and Technology). She was also involved in starting Information Science Abstracts, which first appeared in 1966.

From 1973 to 1982 she was Professor of Information Science and Director of Libraries at the Medical College of Pennsylvania. There she helped to establish the Florence A. Moore Library of Medicine.

She was one of the first people to try to document the history of information science. Her papers are on deposit at the Charles Babbage Institute. Having experienced the beginning of the information age, Schultz's perspective on the advent of the Internet was that it presented "a huge, formless haystack in which to find needles", which would make "for some very complex mixing and matching" in database searches.

Schultz died of Alzheimer's disease, on May 28, 2015.

== Awards ==
- ASIS Award of Merit Association for Information Science and Technology, 1980
