= Martha E. Williams =

American information scientist

Martha E. Williams (September 21, 1934- July 5, 2007) was an information scientist best known for her work in online databases and information retrieval systems.

== Early life ==
Martha Williams was born on September 21, 1934, in Chicago, Illinois, to Harold and Alice Williams. She grew up as one of five siblings on the North Side of Chicago. Williams attended Catholic high school at the Woodlands Academy of the Sacred Heart for girls in Chicago, Illinois. She received her bachelor's degree in chemistry in 1955 from Barat College in Lake Forest, Illinois, also a women's institution. She later received her master's degree in philosophy from Loyola University of Chicago in 1957.

== Career ==
=== Early career ===
Williams began her career as a chemist at the Illinois Institute of Technology Research Institute (IITRI) in Chicago. First as a technical assistant, then as an assistant supervisor in technical information research, and finally as the manager of information sciences. Additionally, Williams became director of the Computer Search Center as she secured funding from the National Science Foundation (NSF) and began research into database searching applications.

=== Later career ===
In 1972, she was asked to join the teaching staff at the University of Illinois at Urbana-Champaign (UIUC) as a research professor in the Coordinated Science Laboratory of the College of Engineering, retiring 29 years later in 2007. Here, Williams founded and ran the Information Retrieval Research Laboratory (IRRL). Concurrently, she also worked in the university's library, the Graduate School of Library and Information Science, and the computer science department.

=== Work in online databases ===
Beginning in the 1960s, Williams worked largely in database development, becoming a computer database specialist. Williams helped create computer-readable databases and developed a search algorithm to assist in online searching. Using ongoing NSF grants, Williams worked on projects that included database mapping models, search schemes for resource sharing, a database selector for network use, an integrated man/machine interface to facilitate network resource utilization, automatic duplicate detection of journal articles appearing in multiple databases, and comparative analyses of online retrieval interfaces. Williams pioneered online database research and the development of better search applications, especially in scientific databases. Williams wrote extensively on these topics and has been cited often.

== Leadership/Awards ==
Williams also held many leadership roles within several institutions:

- Chairman of the board of directors, Engineering Information Inc. (1981-1989)
- Chairman of the board of regents, U.S. National Library of Medicine (1981-1982)
- President, Association for Information and Dissemination Centers (1975-1975; 1976-1977)
- Chairman, Large Database Subcommittee of the Committee on Chemical Information; National Academy of Sciences (1973-1973)
- President, American Society for Information Science (ASIS); (1987-1988)
- Editor, Annual Review of Information Science and Technology (ARIST); (1975-2000)
- Award of Merit, American Society for Information Science and Technology (1984)
