= John G. Lorenz =

John G. Lorenz (1916 – May 13, 2016) was an American librarian who served as Deputy Librarian of Congress and Acting Librarian of Congress.

== Education and career ==
Lorenz earned a bachelor's degree from the College of the City of New York, a master's degree in public administration from Michigan State University and a master's degree in library science from Columbia University.

He began his career as a librarian in the Queens (New York) Public Library and later worked in the public libraries of Schenectady, New York, and Grand Rapids, Michigan.

From 1946 to 1957, he served as assistant state librarian in Michigan.

In 1957, he joined the Library Services Branch of the U.S. Office of Education (then part of the Department of Health, Education, and Welfare), where he advanced to director of the Division of Library Services.

In August 1965, President Lyndon B. Johnson appointed Lorenz as Deputy Librarian of Congress. During his tenure at the Library of Congress (1965–1976), Lorenz played a key role in major initiatives, including the National Program for Acquisitions and Cataloging, the Machine-Readable Cataloging (MARC) program, and Cataloging in Publication. He was active in planning the James Madison Memorial Building.

After the retirement of Librarian of Congress Lawrence Quincy Mumford on December 31, 1974, Lorenz served as Acting Librarian of Congress from January 1, 1975, to November 11, 1975, until Daniel J. Boorstin was sworn in as the 12th Librarian.

In 1976, Lorenz was appointed executive director of the Association of Research Libraries (ARL). He lobbied for Title II-C of the Higher Education Act and obtained foundation support for the ARL Office of Management Studies.

He left ARL in 1979 and was presidential appointee to the National Historical Publications and Awards Commission from 1979 to 1983.

He served as coordinator of the library statistics program at the National Commission on Libraries and Information Science from 1988 to 1997. He played a coordinating role in both the 1979 and 1991 White House Conferences on Library and Information Services

== Professional Activity ==
Lorenz was an active member of the American Library Association. He was a member on the executive board (1972–76) and served two terms on the ALA Council.

He was chair of the International Relations Roundtable and a member of the International Relations Committee. He served on the Grants Committee of the Library Education Division and was a member of the Association of College and Research Libraries Publications in Librarianship Editorial Board.

Lorenz was honored with the ALA Joseph W. Lippincott Award in 1993 for distinguished service to the profession.

== Selected Publications ==
- Lorenz, John G. “International Implications of the Shared Cataloging Program: Planning for Bibliographic Control.” Libri 17 (1967): 276–284.
- Lorenz, John G. (Winter 1972). "The Library of Congress Abroad". Library Trends. 20 (3): 548–576.
- Lorenz, John G. (1972). "Libraries and the Right to Read". North Carolina Libraries. 30 (1–2). doi:10.3776/ncl.v30i1.4133.
- Lorenz, John G. University Library Development: Library Manpower: Republic of Indonesia. UNESCO document FMR/PGI/OPS/80/226 (UNDP), 1980.
- Lorenz, John G. Data Comparability and Public Policy: New Interest in Public Library Data. American Statistical Association. NCES 94-07.Washington, DC: National Center for Education Statistics, November 1994.
