= Atherton Seidell =

- Born: December 31, 1878 Hartwell, Georgia, U.S.
- Died: July 25, 1961 (aged 82) Washington, D.C., U.S.
- Occupation: chemist

Atherton Seidell (1878 – July 25, 1961), a founder of the American Documentation Institute (predecessor of the American Society for Information Science), was a chemist and who became a strong proponent of the use of microfilm for the management of scientific information. As Peter Hirtle writes, "Through a series of seminal articles in Science in the 1930s and 1940s, Seidell established a theoretical justification for the use of microfilms as a means of facilitating scientific information exchange."

Along with M. de Saint Rat, Seidell developed a simple, inexpensive ($2.00 in 1950), monocular microfilm viewing device, known as the "Seidell viewer," that was sold during the 1940s and 1950s.

Seidell's studies of vitamins lead to numerous publications, including the book, Solubilities of Inorganic and Organic Compounds. This text was first announced in a 1907 issue of the Journal of the American Chemical Society, with the title, Solubilities of Inorganic and Organic Substances: A Handbook of the Most Reliable Quantitative Solubility Determinations. The text appeared in numerous editions over the course of fifty years, the last with which Seidell was involved being entitled, Solubilities, Inorganic and Metal Organic Compounds: A Compilation of Solubility Data from the Periodical Literature. This edition was co-written in 1958 with William F. Linke, who produced another edition in 1965.

== Role in the National Library of Medicine ==
Seidell played an important role in the introduction of microfilm to the National Library of Medicine (called the Army Medical Library at the time) in the 1940s. He developed the first Current List of Medical Literature, which later became the Index Medicus and then Medline. A collection of his papers are held in the NLM archives.

== Publications on microfilm and documentation ==
— (5 March 1937). "Dissemination of Scientific Literature by means of Microfilms". Science. 85 (2201): 240–2. Bibcode:1937Sci....85..240S. doi:10.1126/science.85.2201.240. PMID 17841376.
— (10 January 1941). "The Distribution of the Periodical Literature of Science". Science. 93 (2402): 38–9. Bibcode:1941Sci....93...38S. doi:10.1126/science.93.2402.38. PMID 17772882.
—; Fox, L. A.; Laird, R. L. (1 August 1941). "The Place of Microfilm Copying in Library Organization". Science. 94 (2431): 114–5. Bibcode:1941Sci....94..114S. doi:10.1126/science.94.2431.114-a. PMID 17801498. S2CID 7359445.
— (28 November 1941). "The Comparative Cost of Loan Service and of Microfilm Copying in Libraries". Science. 94 (2448): 515–6. Bibcode:1941Sci....94..515S. doi:10.1126/science.94.2448.515. PMID 17809182.
— (23 August 1946). "International Cooperation in Scientific Documentation". Science. 104 (2695): 174–5. Bibcode:1946Sci...104..174S. doi:10.1126/science.104.2695.174. PMID 17770695. — (April 1950). "Proposal for a committee on promoting microfilm copying in libraries". American Documentation. 1 (2): 121–2.
— (July 1956). "Documentation and microfilm copying". American Documentation. 7 (3): 231–2. doi:10.1002/asi.5090070310.
