= National Commission on Libraries and Information Science =

U.S. government agency

U.S. National Commission on Libraries and Information Science (NCLIS) logo

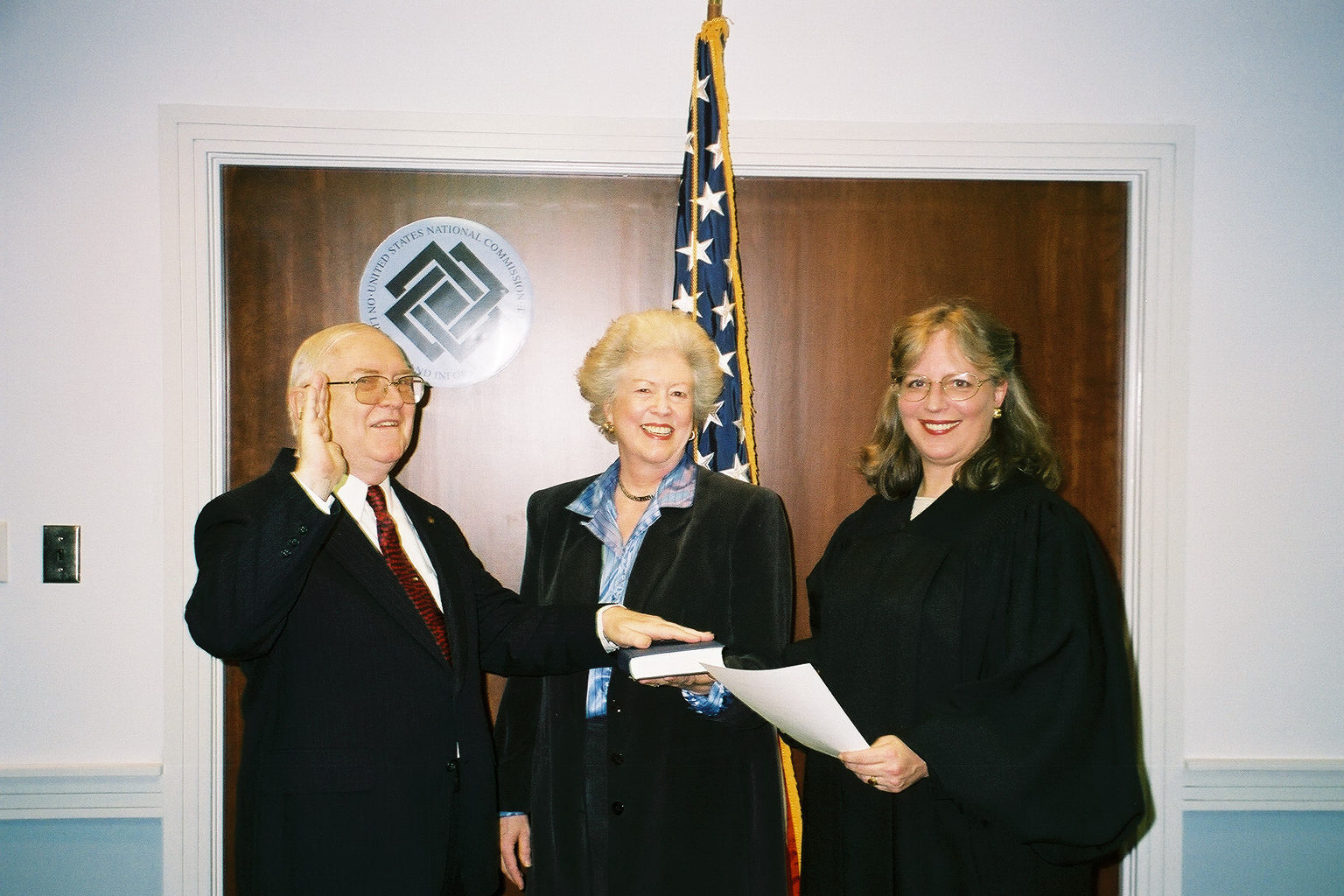
Donald L. Robinson sworn in as a member of the National Commission on Libraries and Information Science, 2001

The National Commission on Libraries and Information Science (NCLIS) was an agency in the United States government between 1970 and 2008. The activities of the Commission were consolidated into the Institute of Museum and Library Services. Records of NCLIS are held at the U.S. National Archives and Records Administration and the University of Michigan Library, Special Collections as part of the Power Collection for the Study of Scholarly Communication and Information Transfer.

== National Advisory Commission on Libraries ==
President Lyndon B. Johnson appointed a National Advisory Commission on Libraries in 1966 to appraise the role and adequacy of the nation's libraries and recommend ways of improving them. Members of the Commission appointed: Dr. Douglas Knight, president, Duke University, as Commission chairman; Verner W. Clapp, president, Council on Library and Information Resources; Carl Overhage, director of Project INTREX, M.I.T.; Herman H. Fussler, director of libraries, University of Chicago; Theodore Waller, president, Grolier Educational Corporation; Wilbur Schramm, director, Institute for Communication Research, Stanford University; Launor Carter, System Development Corporation; William N. Hubbard, Jr., chairman, Educause (then EDUCOM); Caryl P. Haskins, Carnegie Institution for Science; Alvin C. Eurich, president, Aspen Institute; Stephen J. Wright, former president of Fisk University; Harry Ransom, University of Texas at Austin; Carl Elliott, former Congressman from Alabama; Bessie Boehm Moore, Arkansas State Council on Economic Education; and Estelle Brodman, National Library of Medicine.

The National Advisory Commission was appointed to "make a comprehensive study and appraisal of the role of libraries as resources for scholarly pursuits, as centers for the dissemination of knowledge, and as components of the evolving national information systems." The Commission report, Libraries at Large: Tradition, Innovation, and the National Interest; the Resource Book Based on the Materials of the National Advisory Commission on Libraries, provided documentation for legislation.

Other responsibilities included the appraisal of public agency programs and library funding. The Commission also had the task of making recommendations for government and private agencies to "ensure an effective and efficient library system for the Nation." After Hearings before the United States House Committee on Education and Labor, Select Subcommittee on Education The Advisory Commission ultimately recommended "the establishment of a National Commission on Library and Information Science as a continuing Federal Planning agency." The recommendations of the National Advisory Commission were incorporated into legislation (PL 91-345) that established the National Commission on Libraries and Information Science (NCLIS) as a permanent, independent agency of the Federal government of the United States in 1970.

== NCLIS Purpose ==
1. Advise the President and the Congress on the implementation of policy.
2. Conduct surveys and studies relative to library and information needs.
3. Develop plans to meet national library and information needs.
4. Advise federal, state, local, and private agencies regarding library and information sciences.

== Activities ==
=== Government information ===
Studies making recommendations on the dissemination of federal government information, including:

- Zurkowski, Paul G. (1974). The Information Service Environment Relationships and Priorities. Report to the National Commission on Library and Information Science (NCLIS). ERIC:ED100391.1974.
- 1978–2001 Study of the role of government documents in a national program of library and information services.
- "Principles of Public Information", adopted by NCLIS on June 29, 1990.
- "Comprehensive Assessment of Public Information Dissemination", issued in 2001 (http://ufdc.ufl.edu/AA00038081/00040/allvolumes).

=== White House Conferences on Library and Information Services ===
In 1979, President Jimmy Carter opened the first White House Conference on Library and Information Services stating that "libraries must be strengthened and the public made more aware of their potential: Libraries can be community resources for the consumer and small business on matters such as energy and marketing and technological innovation."

The National Commission on Libraries and Information Science sponsored two White House Conferences in 1979 and 1991. The 1979 conference focused on "Elements of a Comprehensive National Library and Information Services Program"; "Legislative and Administrative Initiatives"; and a proposed National Library and Information Services Act. Sixty-four resolutions were passed in five areas: services for personal needs, lifelong learning, organizations and the professions, social government, and international cooperation and understanding. "The resolutions asked that libraries serve people in better ways, that local control of these services be maintained, and that institutions providing the services be accountable." Attendance was 3,600.

The 1991 Conference held July 9–13, 1991, brought more than 900 delegates. They represented all fifty states, the District of Columbia, and six U.S. territories. Resolutions included Access, Governance, Marketing, Networking, National Information Policy, Preservation, Services to Diverse Populations, Technology, Training of End Users, and Personnel. Hearings were held on recommendations.

The lasting effects of the two White House Conferences on Library and Information Services were assessed by Virginia Mathews for the Center for the Book in 2004.

The records of the state-level White House pre-conferences are held at the University of Illinois at Urbana-Champaign Archives. Some states, like Alabama and North Carolina, published state proceedings; Other states, like Arkansas and Massachusetts, included coverage in state association journals.

=== Continuing Library Education Network and Exchange ===
Dean Elizabeth W. Stone of the Catholic University of America School of Library and Information Science was contracted by the National Commission on Libraries and Information Science for a study "to design a national conceptual blueprint for the provision of access to learning opportunities for all library and information science personnel.” The major outcome of this project was the recommendation that a new organization be created- the Continuing Library Education Network and Exchange (CLENE), intended to be the freestanding CE arm of the profession, involving associations, state library agencies, library schools, as well as employers and library/information personnel.

=== Statistical and other activities ===
- Between 1973 and 2000, NCLIS published at least ten reports dealing with public libraries. Reports reports dealt with funding, providing Internet access to the public, and establishing community information and referral services.
- Statistics. John G. Lorenz was a key manager of statistical initiatives.
- The sister libraries program.
- Conference on information literacy held in Prague in 2003.
- The report Trust and Terror: New Demands for Crisis Information Dissemination and Management, a proposal to expand the role of U.S. libraries in crisis information dissemination and management with Walter Cronkite narrating.

== Strategic Goals ==
In 2004, the National Commission on Libraries and Information Science (NCLIS) announced three strategic goals to guide its work in the immediate future.

- Appraising and assessing library and information services provided for the American people,
- Strengthening the relevance of libraries and information science in the lives of the American people,
- Promoting research and development for extending and improving library and information services for the American people.

== NCLIS executive directors ==
Name	Tenure	References
Charles H. Stevens	1971–1974	
Alphonse F. Trezza	1974–1980	
Toni Carbo Bearman	1980–1986	
Vivian J. Arterbery	1986–1988	
Susan K. Martin	1988–1990	
Peter R. Young	1990–1997	
Robert S. Willard	1998–2004	
Trudi Bellardo Hahn	2004–2008	

== NCLIS chairs ==
Brief biographies and photographs of NCLIS chairs are provided in Meeting the Information Needs of the American People: Past Actions and Future Initiatives Appendix B.

- Frederick Burkhardt (1970–1978)
- Charles Benton (1978–1982)
- Elinor M. Hashim (1982–1986)
- Kenneth Y. Tomlinson (1986–1987)
- Jerald C. Newman (1987–1990)
- Charles E. Reid (1990–1992)
- J. Michael Farrell (1992–1993)
- Jeanne Hurley Simon (1993–2000)
- Martha B. Gould (2000–2003)
- Joan R. Challinor (2003–2004)
- Beth Duston Fitzsimmons (2004–2008)

== NCLIS publications ==
The Commission issued a comprehensive list of publications in Appendix F of its final (March 2008) report, Meeting the Information Needs of the American People: Past Actions and Future Initiatives. The report documents the history and accomplishments of the Commission and provides a compelling future agenda for information policy research and development. Among its notable publications was Pathways to Excellence: A Report on Improving Library and Information Services for Native American Peoples

== Closing ==
In Fiscal Year 2007–2008 appropriations, the Commission received limited funding and instructions to terminate its operations. Activities were consolidated under the Institute of Museum and Library Services, and the Commission office closed on March 30, 2008.
