= National Federation of Advanced Information Services =

National Federation of Advanced Information Services (NFAIS) was a United States non-profit institutional membership organization of content and technology providers, specifically those that support the authoritative information needs and activities of professionals across a spectrum of scholarly disciplines and fields of research. The organization provided analysis, news alerts and educational services to its more than sixty members. On July 1, 2019, NFAIS merged with the National Information Standards Organization and ceased independent operations.

== Formation and growth ==
In 1957, the former Soviet Union launched the world’s first spacecraft, Sputnik. This event generated a wave of intense competition in science and technology in the industrialized nations, but one of the rationales offered publicly to Western politicians at the time was that the Soviets had leapt ahead in the space race because they had a more unified and orderly approach to the organization and dissemination of scientific knowledge. Even more importantly, it was believed that science and technology had won World War II and that science and technology would maintain the peace. Therefore, one specific area of attention was enhanced dissemination of the scientific literature to maximize awareness of research and investigation already undertaken. At this time, such activities were documented through the scientific journal and through abstracting and indexing services. In 1958, U.S. President Dwight D. Eisenhower directed the National Science Foundation to ensure the provision of indexing, abstracting, translation, and other information retrieval services as a way of ensuring a constant flow of consistently high-quality information to those working in scientific research facilities.

As the United States mobilized to create a new information infrastructure for the promotion of scientific innovation, G. Miles Conrad, Director of Biological Abstracts (now BIOSIS, part of the Thomson Reuters corporation), called an urgent meeting of fourteen leading not-for-profit and government scientific abstracting and indexing (A&I) services. Such services play a major role in managing the flow of scientific and scholarly communication and have done so since 1665 with the launch of Journal des Scavans. The attending representatives agreed to a model for information dissemination that drew upon the strengths of both scholarly associations of scientists and researchers and government agencies. By working collaboratively, their efforts would support national scientific initiatives as well as promote the international advancement of science. In 1958, convinced of the value of mutual interaction and the interchange of ideas and expertise, a new organization–the National Federation of Science Abstracting and Indexing Services (NFSAIS)–was formed. The organization in its earliest years provided reliable statistical information on journal publication activities, on overlap of information services, cost data, and the status of scientific information dissemination in other countries.

The Federation expanded its scope in 1972 to encompass information producers outside of the scientific and technology sector and dropped science from its name, becoming the National Federation of Abstracting and Indexing Services. Eligibility for membership was widened in 1981 to include the private for-profit sector. The Federation expanded its scope further into the information community in 1982 and changed its name to National Federation of Abstracting and Information Services. Reflecting the advancement of technology and the emergence of the Internet, as well as the changing nature of how research information is collected and archived, the name of the organization became the National Federation of Advanced Information Services in 2007.

== Activities and awards ==
NFAIS's most prestigious award was the Miles Conrad Lecture given annually to “…an outstanding person on a suitable topic in the field of abstracting and indexing, but above the level of any individual service.” The first lecture was given in 1968 by Robert W. Cairns, Chairman of the Committee on Scientific and Technical Communication of the National Academy of Sciences-National Academy of Engineering. The series has continued unbroken since that time to honor those who have made significant contributions to information science and who have been supporters of NFAIS. A full list of the Miles Conrad Lecture recipients is available.

In 1983, NFAIS created the title of Honorary Fellow to recognize those who have made significant contributions to NFAIS and no longer work for a member organization. This honorary designation has been awarded every year since then.
