= Association for Information Science and Technology =

Membership association for information professionals

- Abbreviation: ASIS&T
- Formation: March 13, 1937; 89 years ago
- Type: NGO, professional association
- Headquarters: Silver Spring, Maryland, U.S.
- Members: 2,000 (2011)
- President: Maria Bonn
- Executive Director: Lydia Middleton
- Main organ: Board of Directors
- Staff: 5 (2022)
- Website: www.asist.org
- Formerly called: American Documentation Institute (1937–1967); American Society for Information Science (1968–1999); American Society for Information Science and Technology (2000–2012)

The Association for Information Science and Technology (ASIS&T) is a nonprofit membership organization for information professionals that sponsors an annual conference as well as several serial publications, including the Journal of the Association for Information Science and Technology (JASIST). The organization provides administration and communications support for its various divisions, known as special-interest groups or SIGs; provides administration for geographically defined chapters; connects job seekers with potential employers; and provides organizational support for continuing education programs for information professionals.

Founded as the American Documentation Institute (ADI) in 1937, the group became the American Society for Information Science (ASIS) in 1968 to reflect the organization's interest in "all aspects of the information transfer process" such as, "designing, managing and using information systems and technology." Updating its name in 2000, the American Society for Information Science and Technology (ASIS&T) signaled the widespread prevalence and increasing centrality of online databases and similar technical aspects of the information profession. In 2013 the organization adopted its current name, Association for Information Science and Technology, while retaining the ASIS&T acronym, to better reflect its international membership and the increasingly global nature of our information society. Today the organization comprises professionals from various fields including engineering, linguistics, librarianship, education, chemistry, computer science, and medicine. Members share "a common interest in improving the ways society stores, retrieves, analyzes, manages, archives and disseminates information ".

== History ==
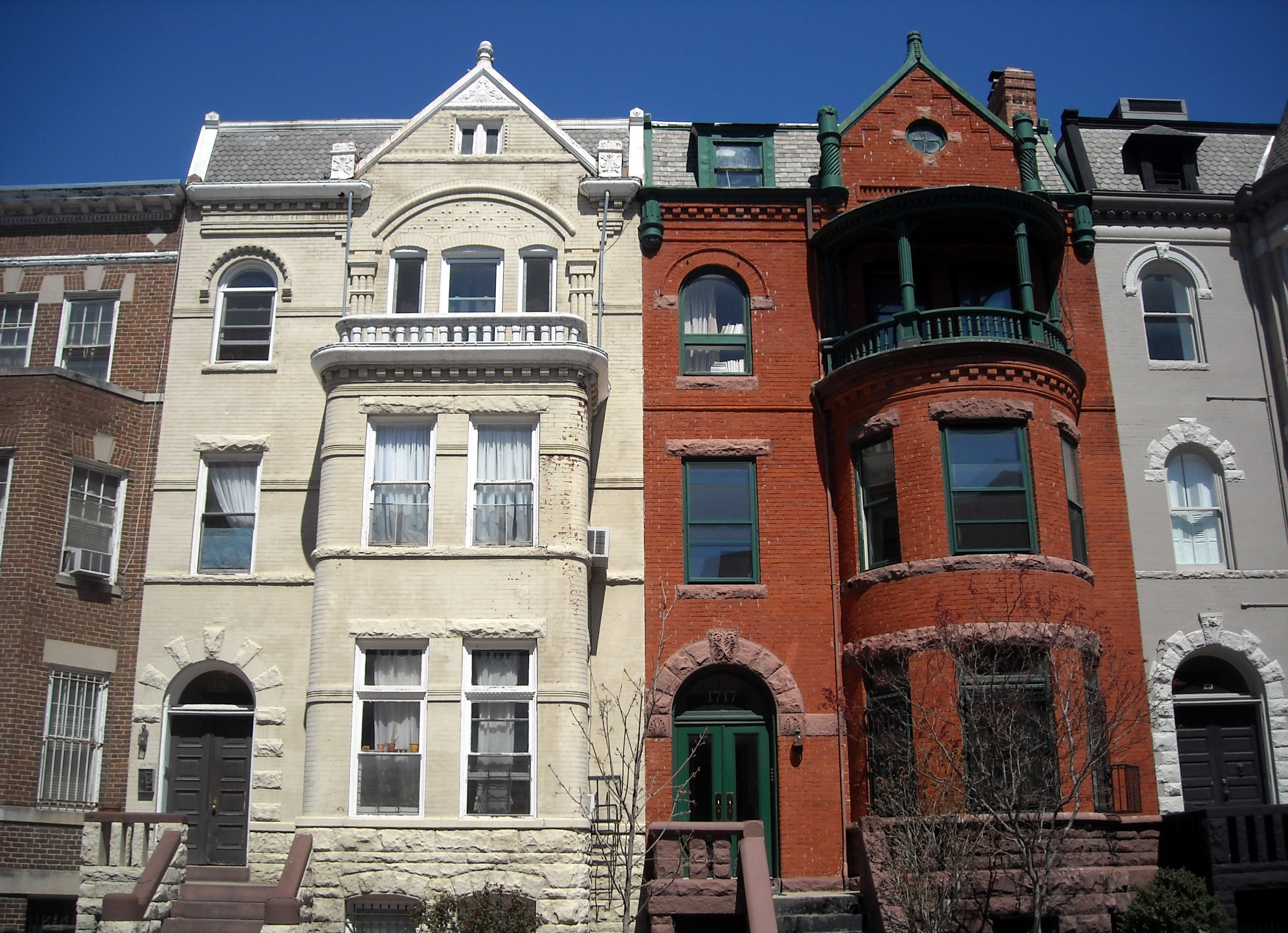
1717 and 1719 S Street, N.W. – former headquarters of the American Documentation Institute

Watson Davis formed the Documentation Institute in 1935, which became the American Documentation Institute (ADI) on 13 March 1937 with the collaboration of Atherton Seidell and others. The organization was first concerned with microfilm and its role as a vehicle for the dissemination of information. ADI worked toward the development of microfilm readers and cameras. Their first microfilm laboratories were located in the U.S.Department of Agriculture Library in Washington, DC and the Institute distributed materials through the newly created Bibliofilm Service.

ADI established the Auxiliary Publication Program, which during its 30-year history released nearly 10,000 documents covering a wide range of subjects. The program enabled authors in the fields of physical, natural, social, historical and information sciences to publish and distribute research papers that were either too long, typographically complex or expensive to be published in journals using existing technology. In 1954, the Photoduplication Service at the Library of Congress took over the operation and became the source point for distributing ADI materials and in 2009 this material found its home in the Library's Technical Reports and Standards Unit.

ADI bylaws were amended in 1952 to allow individuals to become members due to the number of people that were engaged in the development of new principles and techniques. The goal was to make ADI a group that was concerned with all elements and problems of information science not just libraries. During this time there were increased interests and developments of automatic devices for searching, storage and retrieval.

During the 1970s many institutions were making the move from batch processing to online modes, from mainframe computers to more modern computers. With the advancement of technology the traditional boundaries began to fade and library schools started to add "information" in the titles of their programs. ASIS sponsored a bicentennial conference which focused on the role of information in the country's development. ASIS collaborated on planning and implementation of the National Commission on Libraries and Information Science § White House Conferences in 1979 and 1991.

The popularity of personal computers in the 1980s marks a shift that allows individuals to access large databases, such as Grateful Med at the National Library of Medicine, and user-oriented services such as Dialog and CompuServe from their homes. ASIS created groups on office information, personal computers, international information issues and rural information services in response to the changing environment. Eventually other groups were created, such as: non-print media, social sciences, energy and the environment, and community information systems. ASIS also added its first chapters outside North America.

Today ASIS&T is at the forefront of examining the technical bases, social consequences, and theoretical understanding of the information society. They also study the effects of widespread use of databases in government, industry, and education, and the development of information environments on the Internet and World Wide Web.

On May 23, 2025, it was announced that ASIS&T had entered merger negotiations with the Special Libraries Association.

== Mission ==
In a world where "information is of central importance to personal, social, political, and economic progress", ASIS&T seeks to advance the information sciences and information technology by providing focus, opportunity, and support to information professionals and information organizations. ASIS&T seeks to advance knowledge "about information, its creation, properties, and use" as well as increase "public awareness of the information sciences and technologies and their benefits to society."

== Vision ==
To establish an information professionalism in the world by: Advancing knowledge about information; Providing analysis of ideas; Valuing theory, research, applications, and service; Nurturing new perspectives, interests, and ideas; Increasing public awareness of the information sciences and technologies and their benefits to society."

== Membership ==
Originally membership was based on representatives nominated by scientific societies, professional associations, foundations, and government agencies. Changes made to the bylaws in 1952 opened the organization to any individual with interest in the dissemination of information. Today, fee-based memberships can be either individual or institutional, with no formal requirements to join as an individual. Similar to most organizations of its kind, ASIS&T offers benefits to its members in the form of subscriptions to publications, access to job assistance services (JobLine); and discounts to ASIS&T-sponsored events.

== Leadership ==
The current President of ASIS&T is Maria Boon, Professor at the University of Illinois at Urbana-Champaign. The President-Elect is Marlene Holmner, PhD, University of Pretoria, Pretoria, South Africa. A complete list of Past Presidents is listed on the ASIS&T website. The Board of Directors includes Chris Cunningham (Treasurer), Lu An, Timothy Dickey, Bhakti Gala, Lisa Hussey, Aylin Imeri, and Luanne Sinnamon.

Lydia Middleton has served as the Executive Director of ASIS&T since May 2017.

== Publications ==
In 1966, ADI began publication of the Annual Review of Information Science and Technology. Its successor organizations continued publishing the annual review under that title until 2011.

=== JASIS / JASIST ===
ADI decided in 1950 to create a journal modeled after the defunct Journal of Documentary Reproduction, which had been published by the American Library Association from 1938 to 1942. ADI published the journal American Documentation. from 1950 until 1968, when ADI changed its name as an organization and renamed American Documentation as the Journal of the American Society for Information Science (JASIS). With the society's subsequent name changes the journal title followed suit, becoming the Journal of the American Society for Information Science and Technology (JASIST) in 2000, and then the Journal of the Association for Information Science and Technology in 2014.

== Awards ==
See also: Award of Merit - Association for Information Science and Technology

ASIS&T bestows several awards including the Award of Merit, its highest honor, as well as the Best Information Science Book Award; the Bob Williams Research Paper Award and Bob Williams Research Grant which recognizes the best refereed paper and project relevant to the history of information science and technology; Best paper award in the Journal of the Association for Information Science and Technology; the Outstanding Information Science Teacher Award and the Watson Davis Award for Service.

== See also ==
- Association of Information Technology Professionals (AITP)
- Society of Information Technology Management (SOCITM), related group based in the UK
- Association for Library and Information Science Education (ALISE)

Related governmental agencies
- National Commission on Libraries and Information Science (NCLIS)
- Institute of Museum and Library Services (IMLS)

- Documentation science
- Library Science
- Information Science
