= Rigler-Deutsch Index =

Rigler Deutsch Index
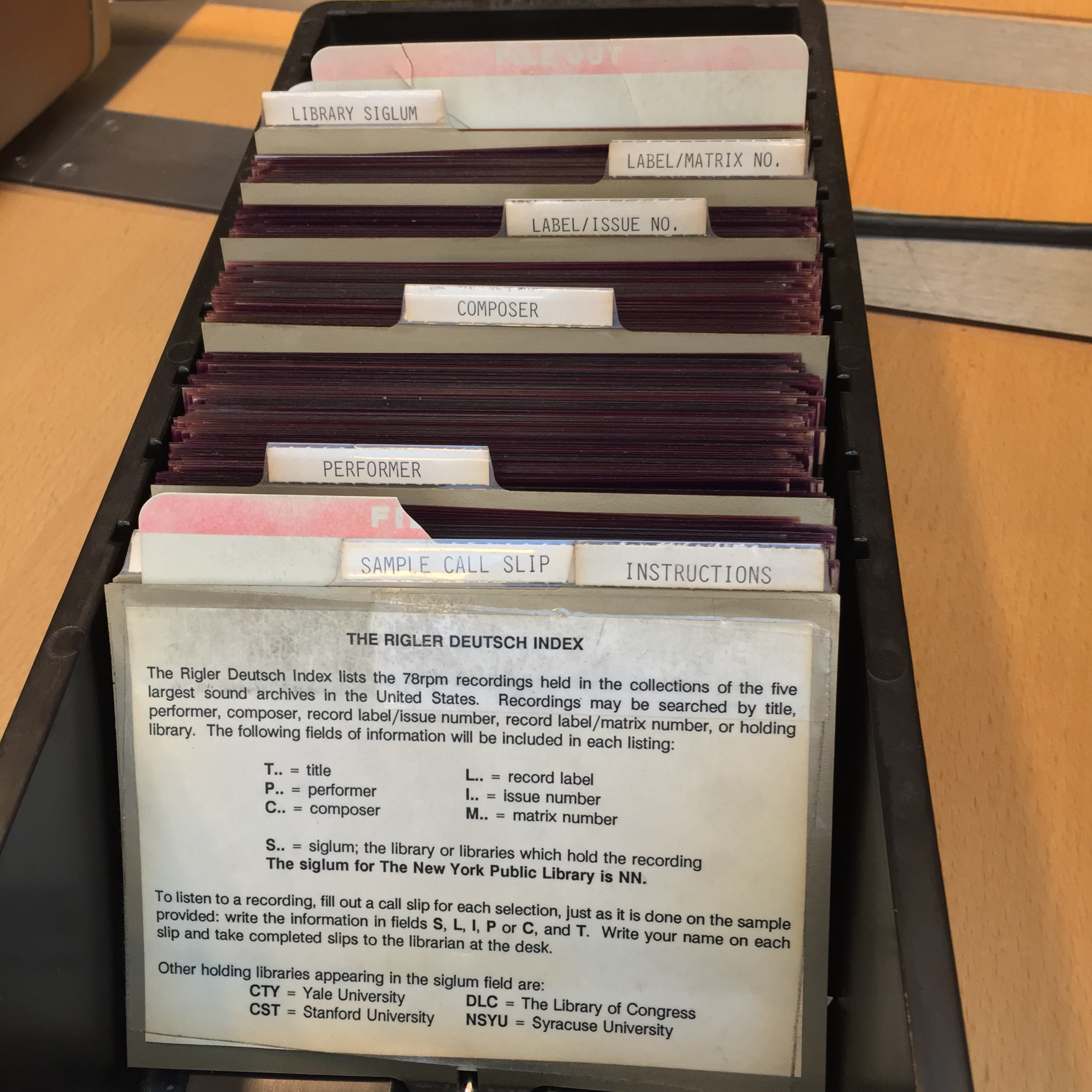
- Housed at: Library of Congress; New York Public Library; Syracuse University; Yale University; Stanford University
- Funded by: National Endowment for the Humanities

The Rigler and Deutsch Index of Recorded Sound, also known as the Rigler Deutsch Index, is a union catalog collocation of the U.S. holdings of 78 rpm records in the collections of the Library of Congress Motion Picture, Broadcasting, and Recorded Sound Division; the Rodgers and Hammerstein Archives of Recorded Sound at the New York Public Library; Belfer Audio Laboratory and Archive at Syracuse University; the Yale Collection of Historical Sound Recordings at Yale University; and the Stanford Archive of Recorded Sound at Stanford University.

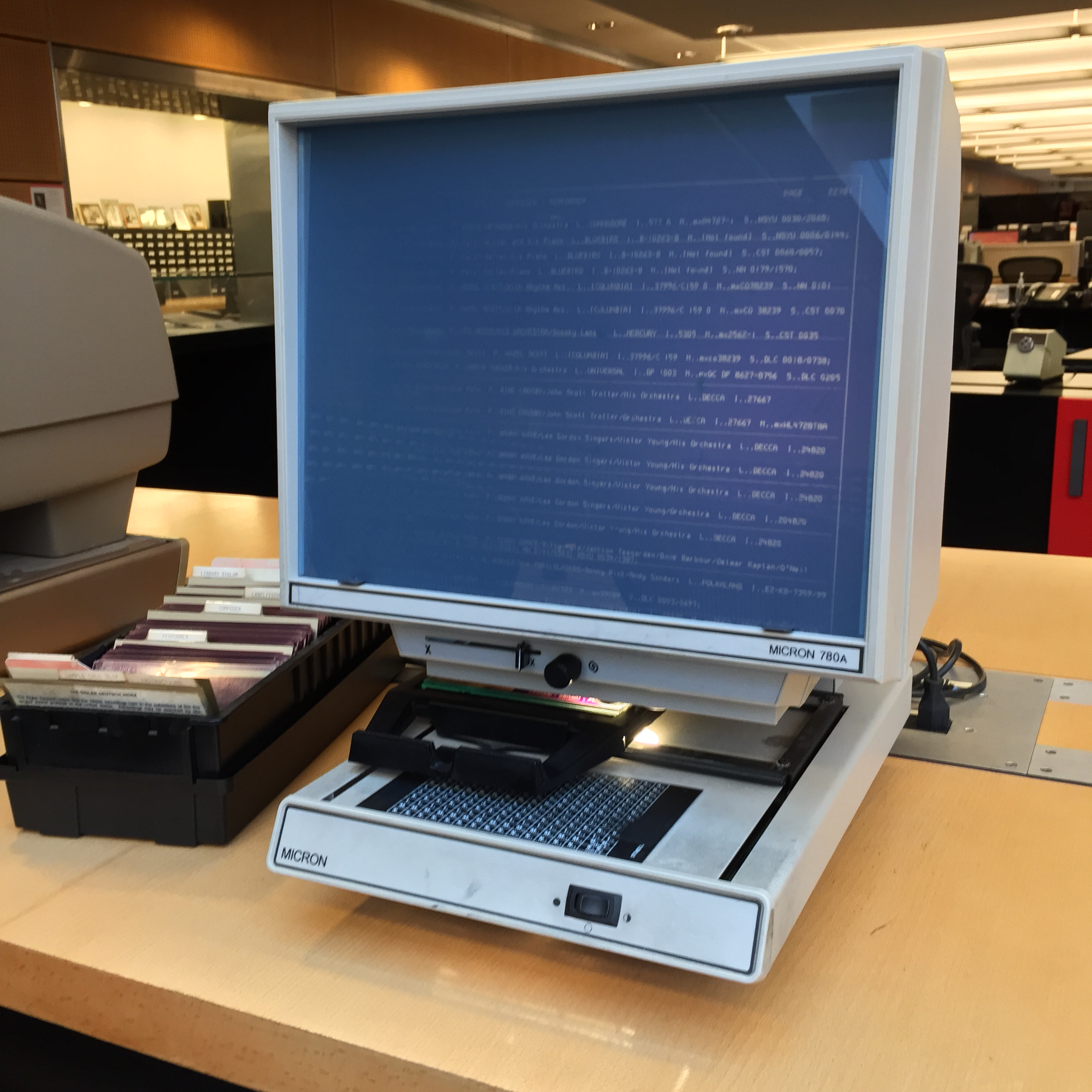
Rigler Deutsch Index (left) Microfiche Reader (right)

== History ==
The Rigler Deutsch Index was characterized as a cooperative, ground-breaking effort. Before its creation, sound recordings on the 78 rpm format were typically uncataloged and difficult to locate, as it was unclear where assets were held—although some collections were organized by label name, matrix number, etc.

The Rigler Deutsch Index was created by the Associated Audio Archivists Committee (AAA) of the Association for Recorded Sound Collections (ARSC) in 1984. The AAA Committee is made up of elected members from each of the participating institutions. This committee conducts large research projects that provide solutions that are critically needed within the library and archive world, like the Rigler Deutsch Index project.

As the institutions met to see if they had overlapping holdings—and cataloged records—the need for a shared solution became clear. Funding from the National Endowment for the Humanities was obtained to start a series of planning and organization meetings in October 1976. These meetings led to the publication of an initial planning study by the Association for Recorded Sound Collections that was conducted in 1978 along with Yale University's preliminary bibliography of journals that would be used in the project, also from 1978. One outcome of this process was the creation of Rules for Archival Cataloging of Sound Recordings, as traditional cataloging methods did not meet all of the needs for recorded sound. Another was the publication of A Discotopology Primer, that was used to guide cataloging and classification of the project.

Funding was made easier by the fact that the University of Maryland had received a Ford Foundation grant and had successfully completed a project for its International Piano Archives, where they used an automated system to create microfilm and an index of its holdings.

Philanthropist Lloyd E. Rigler provided financial support with funds from his company with business partner and record collector Lawrence E. Deutsch, who pre-deceased the project. A National Endowment for the Humanities grant and the Hewlett Foundation and the Ledler Foundation underwrote the project.

Rigler became involved in the project out of an interest in creating a library of opera recordings. He had reached out to David Hall at what was then called New York Public Library's Rodgers and Hammerstein Archives, had learned of AAA's efforts, and agreed to provide matching funds for the Rigler Deutsch Index.

== Overview ==
RDI sample Jerry Persons' Rigler–Deutsch Index Magnetic Tape Recovery Project data set project at Stanford

Although it originated as 16mm microfilm, the Rigler Deutsch Index is typically accessed as a 1,250 microfiche resource, and can be used to research approximately 615,000 recordings ca. 1895 to the mid-1950s.

The Rigler Deutsch Index allows patrons to locate sound recordings at the six participating institutions. It is an index of many records that have not been cataloged.

The Rigler Deutsch Index is organized in six groups:

- Label Name / Matrix Number / Issue Number / Author-Composer / Title / Performer / Archive Siglum
- Label Name / Issue Number / Matrix Number / Author-Composer / Title / Performer / Archive Siglum
- Author-Composer / Title / Performer / Label Name / Issue Number / Matrix Number / Archive Siglum
- Title / Author-Composer / Performer / Label Name / Issue Number / Matrix Number / Archive Siglum
- Performer / Author-Composer / Title / Label Name / Issue Number / Matrix Number / Archive Siglum
- Archive Siglum / Label Name / Issue Number / Matrix Number / Author-Composer / Title / Performer

The Archive Siglum is the library that holds the recording:

- CST: Stanford University – Stanford Archive of Recorded Sound
- CTY: Yale University – Yale Collection of Historical Sound Recordings
- DLC: The Library of Congress – Motion Picture, Broadcasting, and Recorded Sound Division
- NN: New York Public Library of the Performing Arts – Rodgers and Hammerstein Archives of Recorded Sound
- NYSU: Syracuse University – Belfer Audio Laboratory and Archive

== Digitization ==
Sample of original disc images

Efforts to digitize this resource as an asset available online were not initially successful. The initial transfer of information to RLIN and then to OCLC resulted in a loss of bibliographic metadata and location information.

The original efforts involved taking two images of each side of the 78 rpm disc: one image was used to capture metadata from the disc label and the other image was used to capture the etched number (an alphanumeric string) that is found on 78 rpm discs. Information from these original images were then recorded and put on 16mm microfilm and/or microfiche in what is the current Rigler Deutsch Index. In total there were approximately 945 reels of 16mm film, representing 2.2 million disc images, that were put onto COM (computer output microfilm). Copies of this master set are held at the five repositories listed above.

=== Issues ===
While the information was successfully captured, the lack of context and training in cataloging recorded sound by those doing the input affected some data, so the Rigler–Deutsch Index is imperfect. The microfilm format is not very sharp and easy to read.

=== Potential solutions ===
Work is in the closing stages at Stanford University on a project entitled Rigler and Deutsch Record Index project at Stanford, revisited. Pointers to full documentation of the project as well as guides to the source data, to database and bibliographic products, and to methods for searching these resources are preserved in the Stanford Digital Repository and are freely accessible here under the Creative Commons Attribution-NonCommercial-ShareAlike 4.0 International (CC BY-NC-SA 4.0) license.

== See also ==
- National Union Catalog
- NUCMC
- RLIN (Research Libraries Information Network)
