= Underwriting spot =

Type of broadcasting sponsorship announcement

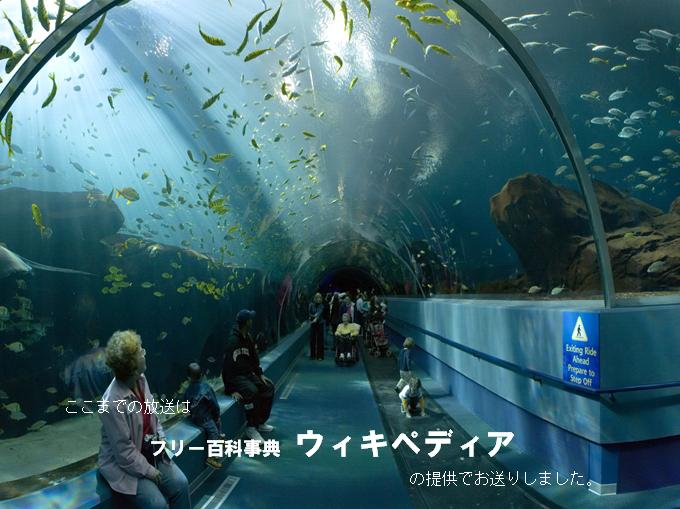
Example of an underwriting spot, the text identifying the sponsor

An underwriting spot, also known as sponsor credit, is an announcement made on public broadcasting outlets, especially in the United States, in exchange for funding. These spots usually mention the name of the sponsor, and can resemble traditional television advertisements in commercial broadcasting to a limited extent; however, under the terms of a public broadcaster's license from the Federal Communications Commission, such spots are prohibited from being promotional (such as making product claims, using superlatives, or being more than 30 seconds long) or making any sort of "call to action" (a phrase that refers to "any device designed to prompt an immediate response or encourage an immediate sale" such as announcing prices or providing an incentive to buy). In the U.S., these restrictions apply to any television or radio station licensed as a non-commercial educational (NCE) stations, and even for non-sponsoring companies and products. However, this is not the case in Japan, as these spots can be played on both public and private broadcasters and are typically played alongside traditional commercials and appear after a show's opening theme or after a preview of a next episode or appear during a scene of a show.

Donors who contribute funding can include corporations, small businesses, philanthropic organizations, charitable trusts, and individuals. An underwriting spot can typically include the name (and, in local underwriting spots, address) of the underwriter, possibly including a company slogan (provided the slogan does not contain a call to action) and a message of appreciation, either from the sponsor indicating its pride in the program or from the station indicating its thanks for the underwriter's sponsorship. Individual spots, more apparent on public radio, often are used to express personal appreciation for the station's programming, and often also offer family members or friend best wishes on a major life event such as a wedding, anniversary or birthday.

Criticisms include inhibiting influences on public affairs programs (even self-censorship) where investigative journalism is featured and tendencies toward the use of non-artistic criteria in determining the selection of programs, such as symphony broadcasts on radio and theatrical productions on television.

== PBS policy ==
The Public Broadcasting Service (PBS) defines its "Program Underwriting Policy" in its PBS Redbook. As of 2022 its provisions include the following:

- Underwriters are defined as third parties that voluntarily contribute cash to partially or fully finance the production or acquisition of a program by a PBS station. Underwriters do not include investment or licensing partners or distribution entities providing cash for other purposes.
- The block of time containing underwriter credits is called the "underwriting credit pod"; it can be no longer than 60 seconds, with no more than 15 seconds allocated per underwriter. If any underwriter is mentioned, then all must be acknowledged.
- Underwriting credit pods must "mirror the production values of the program and flow smoothly with program content and other packaging elements."
- Underwriting credit pods must appear at the end of the program and may appear at the beginning. In news and public affairs programs, and in all programs on PBS since 2009, underwriting credits must be included in both places. The end underwriting pod can be either before or after the program's production credits; if an underwriting pod is including in the beginning, it must start within the program's first three minutes and should be placed after the program's opening or tease (in order to separate national underwriting from local underwriting).
- When PBS partially funds the production, the underwriting credit pod must end with "...from Viewers Like You. Thank you"; when funding is received from the Corporation for Public Broadcasting (CPB), they are credited with a voiceover ("This program was made possible by the Corporation for Public Broadcasting") and a "visual treatment" consisting of the CPB logo, the tag line "a private corporation funded by the American people" and the CPB's website ("cpb.org"); likewise when "Viewers Like You" funding is received, they are credited with a voiceover ("This program was made possible by (the Corporation for Public Broadcasting, and by) contributions to your PBS station from Viewers Like You. Thank you."). Originally, "Viewers Like You" was referred as "Public Television Stations" (often credited as "this station and other public television stations") from PBS's beginnings until 1989. From then to November 1, 1999, it was credited as "the annual financial support from PBS Viewers Like You", with "annual" added in 1993 and "PBS" added in 1997. Optionally, the onscreen credit could refer to "Public Television Viewers" during this period.

Sponsorship underwriting and advertising are essentially the same thing when linked by the exchange of something of value such as cash, goods or services. The underwriter receives a number of informational messages about their business which are broadcast in exchange for a dollar amount. Individuals, foundations, and non-profit donors may underwrite programming without the need for an underwriting informational advertising contract. PBS and CPB rules permit underwriting commercial use for broadcast stations with certain speech limits that are only required of broadcast stations because of the nature of the non-profit license.

Channels that run non-commercial formats on cable television or direct broadcast satellite television tend not to use underwriting spots, as they can use subscriber fees to fund operations (such as C-SPAN). Classic Arts Showcase is an exception, as the service is funded through a foundation established by its founder, Lloyd Rigler, and thus credits that foundation for its funding on-air. As these channels are not broadcast over the air, they are exempt from the wording restrictions on underwriting spots on cable stations, should they choose to use them.

== Japanese policy ==
On most Japanese television and radio stations (such as NHK, ANN, FNN/FNS, JNN, NNN/NNS, TXN, JAITS, OUJ, JRN, NRN, JFN, JFL and MegaNet), sponsors are usually credited with a voiceover (Japanese: ○○の提供でお送りします/しました, romanized: ￮￮ no teikyō de ookuri shimasu/shimashita, lit. 'This Program is (was) brought to you by').

Like the American public stations, these sponsors are usually mentioned before and after the program. Unlike American public stations, these announcements played alongside traditional commercials and during a scene of a show.
