= ALA Medal of Excellence =

American Library Association award

The ALA Medal of Excellence is an annual award bestowed by the American Library Association for recent creative leadership of high order, particularly in the fields of library management, library training, cataloging and classification, and the tools and techniques of librarianship. It was first awarded in 1953 to Ralph R. Shaw, Director of the National Agriculture Library.

The award name was changed in 2020 from the Melvil Dewey Medal to the ALA Medal of Excellence due to Melvil Dewey's "history of racism, anti-Semitism and sexual harassment".

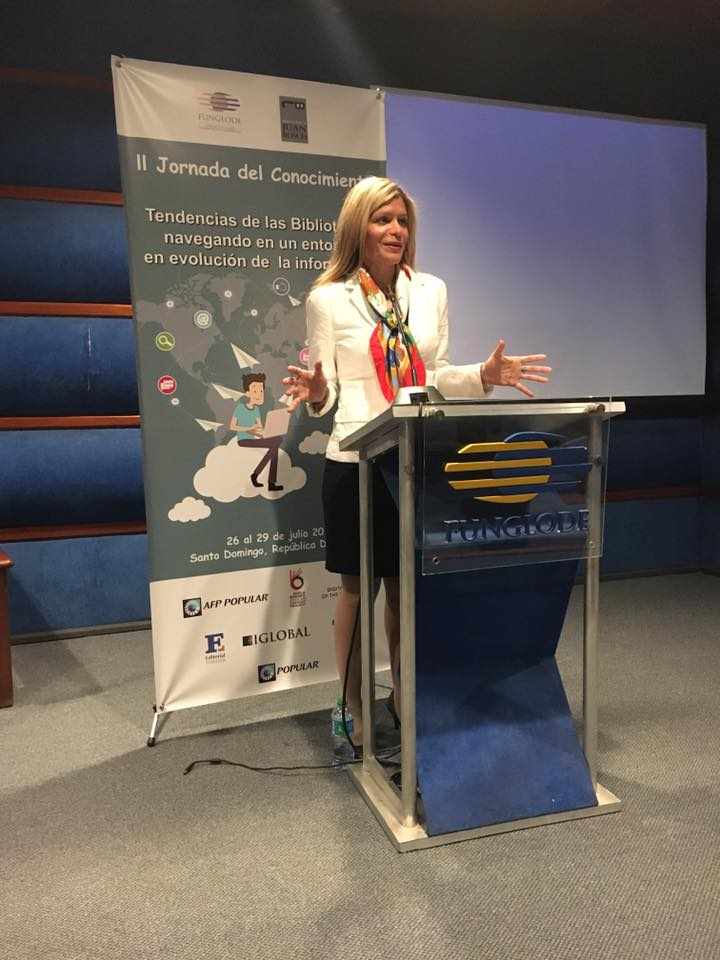
Loida Garcia-Febo - ALA Medal of Excellence, 2024

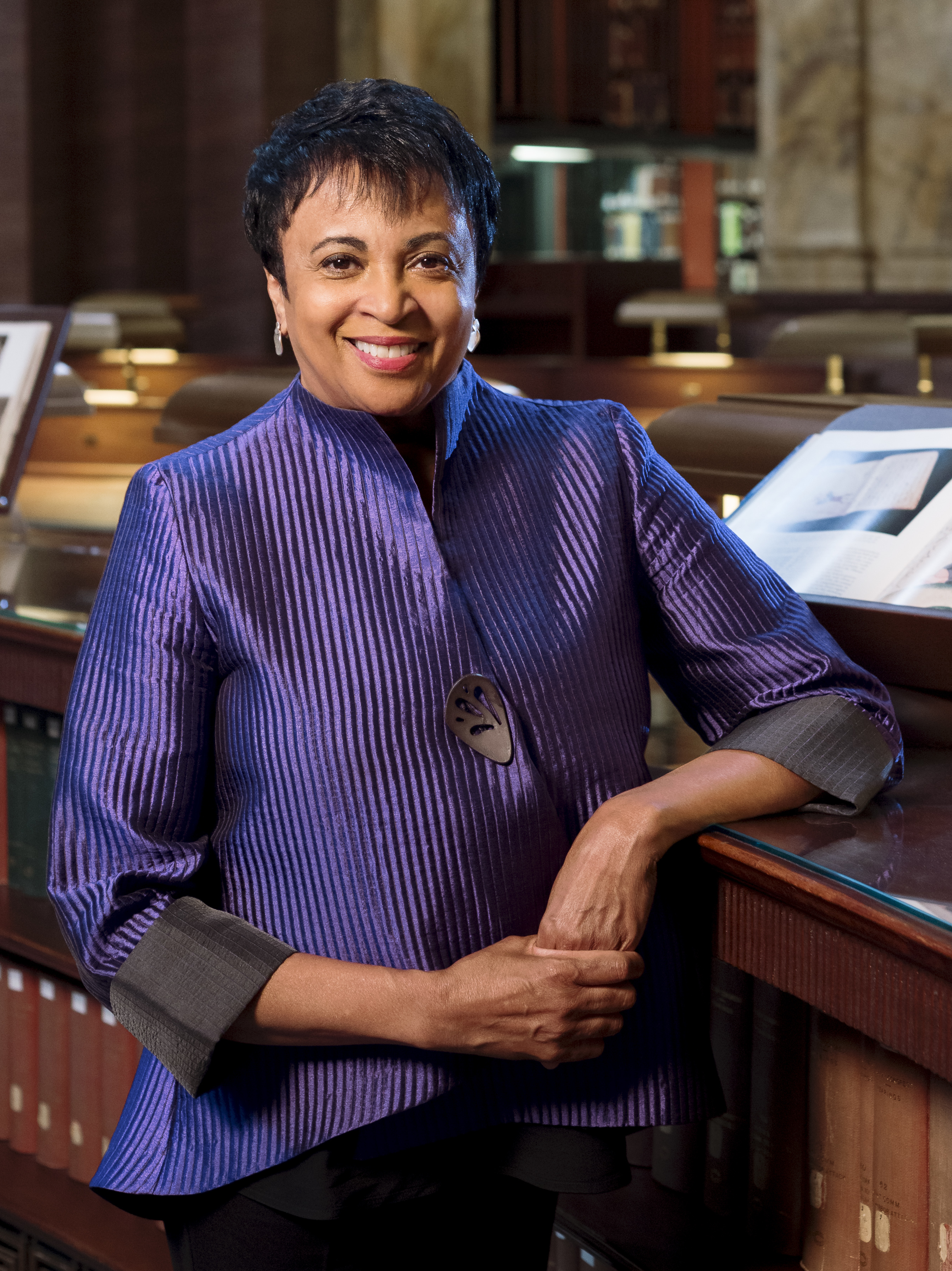
Librarian of Congress Carla Hayden, ALA Medal of Excellence, 2017

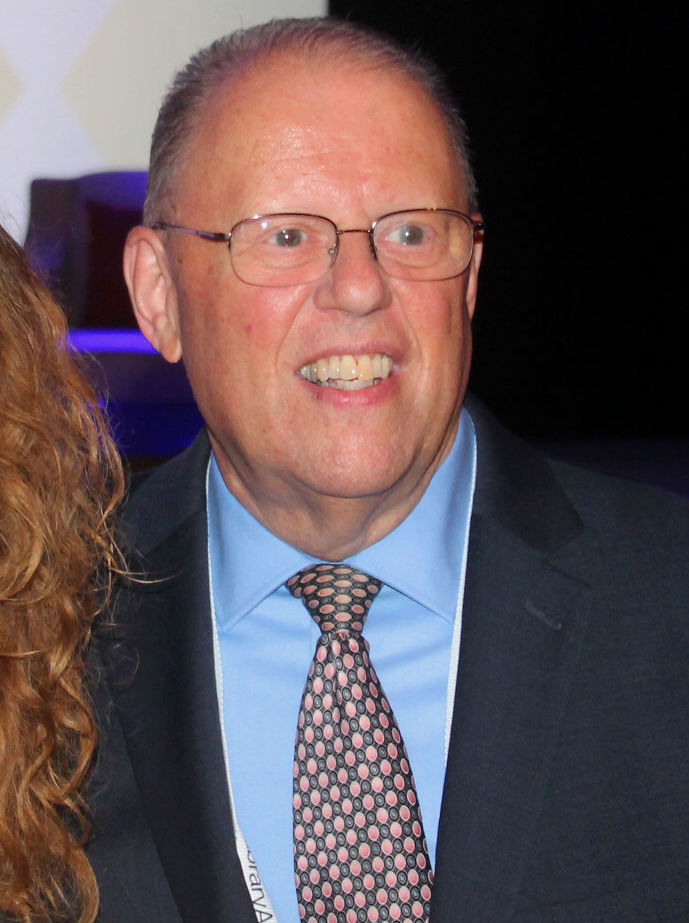
James G. Neal -ALA Medal of Excellence, 2009

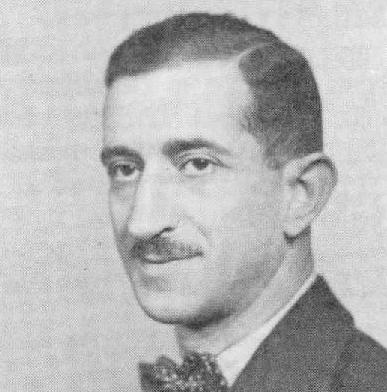
Ralph Robert Shaw - ALA Medal of Excellence, 1953

== List of recipients ==
Recipient	Date	Major accomplishments
Janet Hyunju Clarke	2025	Associate Dean for Research & User Engagement at Stony Brook University Libraries in New York. President Asian Pacific American Librarians Association.
Loida Garcia-Febo	2024	President, American Library Association, President, REFORMA, International librarianship consultant.
Kelvin Watson	2023	“Achievement for recent creative leadership of high order" as executive director, Las Vegas-Clark County Library District
Judith Cannan	2022	Library of Congress-Chief, Policy, Training and Cooperative Programs Division for "Spearheading: the transition from AACR2 to Resource Description and Access, move of original RDA to new Tool Kit, from MARC to linked data, -- the most monumental achievements in cataloging in recent decades.”
No Award	2021	
No Award	2020	
Award Name Changed	2020	The American Library Association Council voted at the 2019 Annual Conference to remove the name of American Library Association cofounder Melvil Dewey from the Melvil Dewey Medal citing his well-documented history of racism, anti- Semitism. and sexual harassment.
June Garcia	2019	Developed international Network of Emerging Library Innovators of Gates’ Foundation's Global Libraries, Director San Antonio Public Library
Carla J. Stoffle	2018	Dean of Libraries and Center for Creative Photography at the University of Arizona, Joseph W. Lippincott Award.
Carla Hayden	2017	Librarian of Congress
Robert Newlen	2016	Chief of staff at the Library of Congress
Hwa-Wei Lee	2015	Ohio University Libraries, Hwa-Wei Lee Center for International Collections
Robert A. Wolven	2014	Digital Content and Libraries Working Group, Library of Congress’ Working Group on the Future of Bibliographic Control, HathiTrust
Beacher J.E. Wiggins	2013	Historic merger of acquisitions and cataloging functions Library of Congress; U.S. National Libraries RDA Test Coordinating Committee; New Bibliographic Framework Initiative Library of Congress Bicentennial Conference on Bibliographic Control for the New Millennium.
Beverly P. Lynch	2012	Training dozens library leaders as director of the UCLA Senior Fellows program; founding director of the California Rare Book School, chair of ALA's International Relations Committee, founder of the US-China Librarians’ conference series.
Deanna B. Marcum	2011	Creation of Working Group on the Future of Bibliographic Control at Library of Congress, President of the Council on Library and Information Resources
Brian E.C. Schottlaender	2010	President, Association of Research Libraries
James G. Neal	2009	Advisor to U.S. delegation at the World Intellectual Property Organization U.S. Copyright Office 108 Study Group.
Sandra Nelson	2008	Public Library Association Results series, public library development.
Sarah Thomas	2007	Bodley's Librarian and Director of the Bodleian Libraries.
John D. Byrum	2006	Library of Congress, Chief Regional and Cooperative Cataloging Division, Program for Cooperative Cataloging.
Joan S. Mitchell	2005	Editor of the Dewey Decimal Classification (DDC) system.
Sally H. McCallum	2004	Chief of Network Development and MARC Standards Office Library of Congress.
David A. Smith	2003	Chief of the decimal classification division at the Library of Congress.
James F. Williams II	2002	Founding member and creator of SPARC the Scholarly Publishing and Academic Resources Coalition.
Herman L. Totten	2001	Regents professor and associate dean for the school of library and information sciences at the University of North Texas.
Paul K. Sybrowsky	2000	Cofounder of Dynix, founder of Snowbird Institute, Ameritech Library Services, President of the board of trustees for the Provo City Library.
Helen Moeller	1999	Director of the LeRoy Collins Leon County Public Library, FL.
Winston Tabb	1998	Program for Cooperative Cataloging (PCC) at the Library of Congress
Robert Wedgeworth	1997	Executive Director, American Library Association, Dean of the School of Library Service at Columbia University Director at the University of Illinois Library—working toward the improvement of library services through adoption of the information technology of the day.
No Award	1996	
No award	1995	
Frank Phillips Grisham	1994	Executive director of SOLINET, Director, Vanderbilt University Library
No Award	1993	
Michael Gorman	1992	Anglo-American Cataloguing Rules; Our Enduring Values: Librarianship in the 21st Century.
Lucia J. Rather	1991	Director for Cataloging at Library of Congress, developed the character set of diacritical marks and special characters used with the MARC format.
Helen Schmierer“	1990	Greatest contribution to protocols of AACR2. Major contributor to Joint Steering Committee for Revision of AACR, systems/planning analyst, Brown University Library.
Robert R. McClarren	1989	“Toward Cooperative Collection Development in the Illinois Library and Information Network.” Robert R. McClarren Legislative Development Award.
Herbert Goldhor	1988	An Introduction to Scientific Research in Librarianship,Research Methods in Librarianship: Measurement and Evaluation. Served in Europe in World War II.
Herbert S. White	1987	Managing the Special Library: Strategies for Success Within the Larger Organization., Executive Director of NASA Scientific and Technical Information Facility.
Richard De Gennaro	1986	"Library automation & networking: perspectives on three decades." Research Libraries Enter the Information Age.
Joseph H. Howard	1985	Chief, Library of Congress Descriptive cataloging division
Warren J. Haas	1984	President Council on Library Resources
Edward G. Holley	1983	Dean UNC School of Information and Library Science,
Sarah K. Vann	1982	Field survey of Dewey Decimal Classification System Use Abroad.
Henriette Avram	1981	Developed MARC format (Machine Readable Cataloging), Associate Librarian for Collections Services, Library of Congress.
Robert D. Stueart	1980	Information Needs of the 80s: Libraries and Information Services Role in “Bringing Information to People
Russell Bidlack	1979	Historical Background of the A.L.A. Catalog.
Frederick G. Kilgour	1978	President of OCLC
Seymour Lubetzky	1977	Cataloging theorist ranked among the greatest minds in library science.
Louis Round Wilson	1976	Dean, University of Chicago Graduate Library School
No Award	1975	
Robert B. Downs	1974	"creative professional achievement of a high order"
Virginia Lacy Jones	1973	"for creative professional achievements of high order." Dean, Atlanta University School of Library Sciences,
Jerrold Orne	1972	Chaired Z39 Committee, precursor to National Information Standards Organization
William J. Welsh	1971	Deputy Librarian of Congress, major role in renovation Jefferson Building, development of deacidification process, pilot project optical disk technology.
Joseph H. Treyz	1970	Books for College Libraries
William S. Dix	1969	Primary author of The Freedom to Read statement.
Jesse H. Shera	1968	"Professional creative achievement."
Walter Herbert Kaiser	1967	"Statistical Trends of Large Public Libraries."
Lucile M. Morsch	1966	Deputy Chief Assistant Librarian of Congress, Rules for Descriptive Cataloging in the Library of Congress
Bertha Margaret Frick	1965	Editor, Sears' List of Subject Headings for H.W. Wilson, member Dewey Decimal Editorial Policy Committee, professor Columbia University.
John W. Cronin	1964	Director, processing department Library of Congress, also chief of the Card Division. Supervised editing of original 167-volume Catalog of Books Represented by Library of Congress Printed Cards.
Frank Bradway Rogers	1963	Director of the National Library of Medicine, Laid foundation for MEDLARS, Director of the Armed Forces Medical Library.
Leon Carnovsky	1962	"For long standing achievement as editor, author, teacher and consultant in bibliographical matters."
Julia C. Pressey	1961	Head, Office for D.C. numbers. Library of Congress
Harriet E. Howe	1960	“The Library School Curriculum.”
Benjamin A. Custer	1959	Editor, Dewey Decimal Classification, Chief of the Decimal Classification Division, Library of Congress.
Janet S. Dickson	1958	Chairman of the Advisory Committee on the Decimal Classification
Wyllis E. Wright	1957	"A librarian's librarian," Wright was president, Association of College and Research Libraries.Chairman, Joint Committee on the Union List of Serials, the DCC Board on Cataloging Policy and Research, the Catalog Code Revision Committees; and editor of Catalogers' and Classifier's Yearbook, and American Library Annual."Invaluable contributions to the evolution of the Anglo-American Cataloging Rules. Librarian at Williams College.
Norah Albanell MacColl	1956	Sistema De Clasificación Decimal Dewey : Tablas E Índice Alfabético Auxiliar
Maurice Tauber	1955	Developer of technical services units and how they evolved in the 20th century. Professor at Columbia University.
Herman H. Fussler	1954	Director, University of Chicago libraries, Dean, University of Chicago Graduate Library School, helped create the Center for Research Libraries.U.S. National Advisory Commission on Libraries.
Ralph R. Shaw	1953	Director, U.S. National Agricultural Library, Dean, Rutgers University Department of Library and Information Science, Founder, Scarecrow Press
