= Hugh Craig Atkinson =

American librarian (1933–1986)

- Born: November 27, 1933; Chicago, Illinois, U.S.
- Died: October 24, 1986 (aged 52)
- Education: Benedictine College; University of Chicago; University of Chicago Graduate Library School (MLS)
- Occupation: Librarian

Hugh Craig Atkinson (November 27, 1933 – October 24, 1986) was an American librarian known for his innovations in library automation and cooperation. He served as director of libraries at Ohio State University from 1971 to 1976 and at the University of Illinois at Urbana-Champaign from 1976 to 1986. In 1999, American Libraries named him one of the 20th century's 100 most important leaders in librarianship.

== Biography ==
Hugh Atkinson was born in Chicago. He worked from 1951 to 1956 as a junior accountant for Lawrence Scudder and Co. while studying accounting at St. Benedict's College. Upon receiving his accounting degree, Atkinson studied English at the University of Chicago, and then received his Masters in Library Science from the University of Chicago Graduate Library School while working in the University Library as a rare books assistant.

Atkinson's professional library career began at Pennsylvania Military College, where he worked from 1958 to 1961 as a reader services librarian. From 1961 to 1967 he held several positions at the State University of New York at Buffalo library, as head of reference, assistant director for technical services, and as acting assistant director of the Health Sciences Libraries. Here, he oversaw the huge growth of the university library as the State University of New York system rapidly expanded.

In 1967, Atkinson moved to Ohio State University where he served as head of public services (1967–71), and then as director of libraries (1971–76). Here he played a seminal role in the creation of one of the first online library circulation systems, the Library Circulation System. The system was later known as the Library Computer System, but is most commonly referred to by the acronym LCS. The system was notable for its decentralized organization, allowing library users in any given branch of the library to view what was available in any other branch. In an interview with Technicalities in 1985, Atkinson stated, "The only way I can see in a decentralized world to maximize library use is to provide, at the varying sites, the ability to borrow freely throughout the campus." This vision of automated cooperation between decentralized libraries was a key manifestation of Atkinson's overall approach to librarianship, which he termed holistic librarianship. At the heart of this approach was a strong belief in "the ideal of cooperation."

Having successfully implemented LCS at Ohio State University, Atkinson spent the last 10 years of his life as university librarian at the University of Illinois at Urbana-Champaign. Here he envisioned and oversaw the creation of the Illinois LCS network, a multi-type library network which connected the circulation information not only of the University of Illinois libraries, but also included many state library systems as well. At the time of his death it was the most developed statewide library system in existence. This multi-type library network was founded on Atkinson's realization that larger libraries do not simply own all the books smaller libraries have and more, but that smaller libraries often have their own unique collections that larger libraries would also benefit from having access to. His goal was to have the diverse composition of the network supplement each library in ways that were beneficial to its own users' needs. He wrote, "My point is that one should not try to reach some kind of theoretical balance or fairness, but to build a network that will provide, by its services and arrangement, the library activities that will satisfy each of the participants, although not necessarily in the same way." The development of this multi-type, online library network was one of Atkinson's crowning achievements as a librarian. In 1981, he told American Libraries that his most important accomplishment was the "clarification in my own mind that the future of the library is in decentralized, electronic access."

In addition to the creation of the Illinois LCS network, Atkinson contributed to the advancement of modern librarianship in a number of other ways during his years as university librarian at the University of Illinois at Urbana-Champaign. He oversaw the reorganization of the library's administrative structure "in accordance with his ideas on professionalism and public service", which has since become the standard for major academic libraries. Another of his advancements during this time was the creation and implementation of one of the first large-scale searchable online catalogs composed of full bibliographic records in which other libraries in the network were able to synch their short-record catalogs to. This catalog was a major innovation not only in its ability to allow users to see more details about a particular book and whether or not it was available in any of the hundreds of interconnected libraries, but to search the records by keyword in a variety of fields including title and subject headings at the same time, which greatly enhanced the usefulness of subject headings.

Hugh Atkinson died on October 24, 1986, aged 52.

== Annual awards in Atkinson's honor ==
The American Library Association (ALA) honors Atkinson's innovations in librarianship through a yearly award. The Hugh C. Atkinson Memorial Award "honors the life and accomplishments of Hugh C. Atkinson by soliciting nominations and recognizing the outstanding accomplishments of an academic librarian who has worked in the areas of library automation or library management and has made contributions (including risk taking) toward the improvement of library services or to library development or research."

The Illinois Library Association (ILA) honors Atkinson and his dedication to "statewide interlibrary cooperation" with a yearly award. The Hugh C. Atkinson Memorial/Demco Award is presented by Illinois Library Association and Demco to an individual, a group, a program, or an institution that makes a lasting impact on librarianship.

== Selected publications ==
- Atkinson, H. C. (1974). Extension of new services and the role of technology. Library Trends, 23(2), 305–317.
- Atkinson, H. C. (1975). Personnel savings through computerized library systems. Library Trends, 23, 587–594.
- Atkinson, H. C. (1984). Two Reactions to Change. Library Journal, 109(13), 1426–7.
- Atkinson, H. C. (1984). Strategies for Change: Part I. Library Journal, 109(1), 58.
- Atkinson, H. C. (1984). Strategies for Change: Part II. Library Journal, 109(5), 556.
- Atkinson, H. C. (1987). Atkinson on networks. American Libraries, 18, 430–5.
