= Henry E. Bliss =

American librarian (1870–1955)

Henry Evelyn Bliss
- Born: January 29, 1870; New York City
- Died: August 9, 1955 (aged 85)
- Occupations: Librarian, Author, Poet

Henry Evelyn Bliss (January 29, 1870 – August 9, 1955) was the author of a classification system he called Bibliographic Classification which is often abbreviated to BC and is sometimes called Bliss Classification. He was named one of the 100 most important leaders in the field of library and Information science in the 20th century by American Libraries in December 1999, which praised his “subject approach to information” as “one of the most flexible ever conceived.” Despite these praises, Bliss was “met with apathy and even derision in his efforts” during his lifetime. His classification system was generally disregarded in favor of other more established classification systems such as the Dewey Decimal System created by Melvil Dewey and the Library of Congress Classification system, causing “more than one author” to label him as a, “prophet without honor.” Although Bliss was an American, his system was more popular in British libraries than in American libraries. A second edition of the system has been developed in the United Kingdom in 1977. Several volumes have been published.

== Life ==
Henry Bliss was born in New York City. The son of Henry H. Bliss and Evalina Matilda Davis. He became the deputy librarian of City College of the City University of New York, now known as the City College of New York, in 1891, where he worked until he retired in 1940. Bliss never obtained a degree of higher education yet he was extremely erudite and well learned. He was also a poet and published a collection of poems entitled Better Late Than Never (1937.) He was married in 1901 and had four children with his wife, Ellen deKoster, before she died in 1943. Bliss’ relationship with the American Library Association was strained at best. He resigned from the institution in 1933 saying that he had received “so dubious a welcome there” and was “treated like an outsider.” He rejoined however in 1937. Bliss was generally rather blunt and biting in his criticism of the work of other librarians, and after his wife's death, and near the end of his life, Bliss became something of a recluse. Despite this, at Bliss's death in 1955 “a generous and moving obituary tribute” was written for him by none other than S.R. Ranganathan. despite the fact that Bliss had criticized Ranganathan by saying that he took him, “Less seriously then some others do, including himself.”

== Bibliographic Classification ==
Bliss is most remembered for his ideas on library classification and the classification system he developed, which he called Bibliographic Classification. The full four volumes of Bibliographic Classification appeared from 1940 to 1953 and “marked half a century of sustained effort” by Bliss. Bliss's reasons for developing this system were primarily because of his discontent with the Classification systems that were at use at the time. For example, Bliss says, “[that] The International Institute’s adoption of the Decimal Classification some 35 years ago, [was] for the specious reason that no better system was then available.” Bliss was emphatic about the fact that “good classification, ‘dignifies the library as an embodiment of knowledge.’”

The basis behind this system is the idea of a “subject approach to knowledge,” where books are ordered in a logical systematic way that is “intertwined with the organization of knowledge in society.” Bliss stressed this relationship by saying “Organizations of Knowledge thus become organizations for thought.” In an article entitled "The System of the Sciences and the Organization of Knowledge" written by Bliss in the January issue Philosophy of Science from 1935, he outlines seven major “principles of classification for organization of knowledge and thought.” Briefly stated and explained, they are,

- Organization - This first principle, while being fairly self-explanatory, Bliss explains by saying “Free thought, like free life, without organization, may rove and rave like Bedlam in a Tower of Babel.”
- Subordination - “of the more special classes [or subjects] to the more general,” for example placing geometry under the more general subject of Mathematics.
- Coordination – “The third structural principle, that classes, or sub-classes, of the same order, or grade, may be arranged serially either vertically or horizontally.”
- Extension– “Serial, branched, and crossed classifications may be combined in structures of three or more extensions.”
- Collocation – or rather, arrangement “of closely related classes for functional efficiency.”
- Gradation in Speciality – Bliss says “as the several sciences become more definite in scope, each becomes more or less special in relation to others, and accordingly they may be arranged in a scalar series of gradation in speciality.”
- Maximal Efficiency – This is the seventh principle “per se.” and is a result of the first six principles when they are followed.

Another of the important features of Bliss's work is his ideas on “Alternative Location.” This simply means that Bliss provided provisions in his system for the possible different shelf locations of certain materials. This can be described as “For certain topics… two or more places would be provided and the individual library would select the one most appropriate to its needs.” One critic described this as, “a handsome concession to rival school of thought.”

== Reception ==
The reception of Bliss's classification system was mixed at best. Bliss said that he received “more discouragement than encouragement from the first.” Many readers of Bliss's work disliked his ideas simply because of the writing style. This was because Bliss's writing was usually very complex and wordy. One critic said that Bliss's writing was “much too long. Its exposition is frequently tedious and it has an overplus of trivial observations.” The reviews weren't all bad, though. Susan Grey Akers, in 1936, wrote that Bliss's system “has possibilities which are interesting and thought-provoking.” Grace O. Kelley, writing in 1934 said, “a field of investigation is here presented which… would go far toward lifting librarianship to a plane of scholarship easily ranking with other disciplines which glory in the possession of subject matter which they can call their own”

== Legacy and lasting importance ==
Bliss is often overlooked in the history of Library Science in favor of such giants as Melvil Dewey and S.R. Ranganathan. However, it is important to remember that “his work represents a major step along the way to the modern classification scheme.” Maltby and Gill in their book The Case for Bliss, writes,“It would be easy to pronounce [Bliss’s work] as a failure. Nevertheless… no individual in the history of bibliographical classification has equaled the time spent by Bliss in ascertaining and weighing the needs of learning, in the penetrating analysis of other systems and the slow evolution of his own.”

He was compared to Melvil Dewey by Eugene Garfield:

“His goals and aspirations were different from those of Melvil Dewey, whom he certainty surpassed in intellectual ability, but by whom he was dwarfed in organizational ability and drive. Dewey was a businessman, but he was in no sense as profound in his accomplishments.”

== Publications ==
- 1929 The Organization of Knowledge and the System of the Sciences
- 1933 The Organization of Knowledge in Libraries
