= UCMC =

UCMC may refer to:

- Ukraine Crisis Media Center
- University of Calgary Medical Clinic
- University of Chicago Medical Center
- University of Cincinnati Medical Center

== See also ==
- NUCMC
- Ucamco
