= American Association of School Librarians =

Division of the American Library Association

The American Association of School Librarians (AASL) is a division of the American Library Association (ALA) that has more than 7,000 members and serves primary school and secondary school librarians in the U.S., Canada, and even internationally. Prior to being established in 1951, school librarians were served by the School Library Section of ALA founded in 1914, which emerged from the Roundtable of Normal and High School Librarians. The mission of the American Association of School Librarians is to empower leaders to transform teaching and learning.

== History ==
At the 1914 ALA Midwinter Conference, a petition from the Roundtable of Normal and High School Librarians for a School Libraries Section was approved. In 1915, at the ALA Annual Conference, Mary E. Hall was elected the section's first president. ALA sections serve the larger membership divisions, of which there are currently eleven. The title AASL was first used in 1944, as part of the ALA's Division of Libraries for Children and Young People. Demand for AASL division status peaked in 1950, when a preconference was held to discuss separating AASL into its own independent division. On January 1, 1951, AASL achieved independent division status. The first president of AASL was Laura K. Martin, who served in 1951–1952. In 1980, AASL held its first national conference in Louisville, Kentucky. In the off years when a national conference is not held, AASL holds a Fall Forum over several days instead. The first Fall Forum was held in Dallas, Texas in 2004 At times, AASL has been at odds with its parent organization. At the 1984 ALA Midwinter Meeting, AASL directors discussed options for obtaining more independence from ALA. Two of the Future Structures Committee's more radical recommendations included a federated structure for AASL, or even secession from ALA.

In November 2015, the House and Senate Conference Committee added language to the Every Student Succeeds Act, recognizing the value of school libraries, an important milestone for AASL and ALA. For 2017, AASL is planning on introducing the AASL Induction Program, a leadership program for new school library professionals.

== Advocacy ==
Advocacy is an important part of the AASL mission. In 1948, AASL first put forth a list of school library standards. In 2007, AASL efforts advocated for flexible scheduling of school library media centers, as well as information literacy. AASL established Banned Websites Awareness Day to call attention to the large number of educational websites that are inadvertently blocked by school website filtering software. This awareness day occurs the Wednesday during Banned Books Week. AASL also created School Library Month, held every April, to showcase school librarians and school library programs. The first School Library Month (then titled School Library Media Month) was held April 1, 1985.

== Affiliate Assembly ==
Since 1977, the AASL Affiliate Assembly has provided a way for school library professionals in each state to relay their concerns to the AASL Board of Directors. The assembly is made up of two representatives, also called delegates, from each affiliated state organization. These affiliated organizations include regional and state school library associations. Delegates are usually the presidents or other officers of the affiliated organizations they represent. Delegates alert the Board of both good and bad in the field through a concerns and commendations process. Statements of Commendation are intended to provide worthy programs with accolades at the national level. Recent Statements of Concern range from improving communication with other divisions within ALA to monitoring the increasing number of public libraries managing school libraries. Statements of Concern are not abstract creations. They are focused concerns that must include a doable plan of action.

== Publications ==
AASL publishes standards for school libraries that provide benchmarks and insight into the indicators for each standard. Its various publications assist in helping school librarians establish effective library programs that meet the needs of the changing school library environment. These titles include its journal Knowledge Quest and an open-access online research journal School Library Research.

National School Library Standards for Learners, School Librarians, and School Libraries was issued in 2018.

== Awards ==
- AASL Chapter of the Year Award
- AASL President's Crystal Apple
- ABC-Clio Leadership Grant
- Best Digital Tools for Teaching & Learning
- Beyond Words: Dollar General School Library Relief Fund
- Distinguished School Administrator Award
- Frances E. Henne Award
- Innovative Reading Grant
- Intellectual Freedom Award
- National School Library of the Year Award
- Research Grant
- Roald Dahl Social Justice Award
- STEM Special Event Grant
- Toor Scholarship for Strong Public School Libraries

== See also ==
- American Library Association
- Association for Library Service to Children
- List of libraries in the United States
- National Education Association
- Young Adult Library Services Association
