= The Library Quarterly =

- Discipline: Library science
- Language: English
- Edited by: Paul T. Jaeger and Natalie Greene Taylor, with Jane Garner and Shannon M. Oltmann

Publication details
- History: 1931–present
- Publisher: University of Chicago Press (United States)
- Frequency: Quarterly
- Impact factor: 0.558 (2016)

Standard abbreviations
- ISO 4: Libr. Q.

Indexing
- CODEN: LIBQAS
- ISSN: 0024-2519
- JSTOR: 00242519
- OCLC no.: 01755858

Links
- Journal homepage

The Library Quarterly is a quarterly double-anonymous peer-reviewed academic journal covering library science, including historical, sociological, statistical, bibliographical, managerial, psychological, and educational aspects of the field. It has been published by the University of Chicago since 1931, and was established to fill a need for investigation and discussion set forth by the American Library Association in 1926. The journal was originally founded at the now-closed the University of Chicago Graduate Library School.

The editors are Paul T. Jaeger (University of Maryland, College Park) and Natalie Greene Taylor (University of South Florida), with associate editors Jane Garner (Charles Sturt University, Australia) and Shannon M. Oltmann (University of Kentucky).

== Cover design ==
Until 2013, the covers of the journal featured emblems from booksellers or printers. Featured in every issue was a study of the particular emblem that focuses on the typographer, dealer, seller, and designer. As of 1975, 176 prints had been displayed on the journal's cover. Many of the essays in the series, "The Cover Design" were written by Howard W. Winger.

Noting the dated appearance of the journal covers, it was decided that part of the overall changes implemented would include a new cover without the emblems. Instead of completely removing these illustrations and the accompanying "The Cover Design" feature after 80 years, the journal renamed the entry "History of the Book" to continue the practice. The University of Florida libraries provide digital access to printers' devices, including those that appeared on the cover of The Library Quarterly.

== History ==
The Library Quarterly was established in January 1931, the year that Lee Pierce Butler joined the University of Chicago Graduate Library School, which was where library science as the academic study of the relationship between books and users was originally conceived. Thus, its publication history parallels the existence of library science as a field of academic research. The emergence of a journal devoted expressly to research in library science was met with conflict in the discipline according to the journal's first editor, William M. Randall. The controversy revolved around whether research and scientific method was needed in the field. The Quarterly continued publication after the Graduate Library School closed in 1989.

Howard W. Winger was managing editor from 1961 through 1972, in 1975, from 1980 through 1985 and from 1988 through 1989. More than 50 of his essays (particularly those on 16th-century printers' devices) appeared in The Library Quarterly. When editorship was taken over by Steven P. Harter in 1990 Winger wrote a history of the journal's editorial boards. In 2002 editor, John V. Richardson, analyzed the peer review process in place at The Library Quarterly.

A bibliometric analysis in 2006 on the 75th anniversary of the journal found that nearly 50% of the world's most cited library and information scientists were contributors.

In 2004 The Library Quarterly went online, adding additional articles, content, and unique supplements. Online features also include most accessed and most cited articles.

A new team of editors, Editorial Board, and a new Reviews Committee were added in 2016.

In the first issue of the 91st volume, the editors identified significant national and international events occurring during publication, including the establishment of the journal during the time of The Great Depression, World War II prior to the ten year anniversary, and the United States entering the war just after that milestone. At the time this volume was released, having passed its 90th year in publication, the world was experiencing the COVID-19 pandemic.

As of 2025, the journal reached its 95th year, making it one of the oldest scholarly publications on the subject of libraries. Over the past nine decades, the journal has documented libraries and their roles during historic moments, and the evolution of the practices, technologies, and diverse topics relating to the field.
