= Elizabeth Homer Morton =

Canadian librarian

Elizabeth Homer Morton (February 3, 1903 – July 6, 1977) was a Canadian librarian. She was the best-known librarian of her generation.

The daughter of Canadian missionaries, she was born in Tunapuna, Trinidad, received her early education there and attended high school in Saint John, New Brunswick. Morton earned a BA from Dalhousie University and a teacher's license at the Normal School in Truro, Nova Scotia. She taught briefly in Cape Breton. She took a librarian's course at the Ontario Library School in Toronto and was hired by the cataloguing department of the Toronto Public Library. In 1928, Morton returned to New Brunswick, where she served as a teacher and helped organize a library at the Saint John Vocational School. She later served as secretary for the New Brunswick Library Commission. From 1931 to 1944, she worked in the reference department of the Toronto Public Library. From 1936 to 1943, she was also secretary-treasurer for the Ontario Library Association.

In 1944, she was named executive secretary for the Canadian Library Council. Morton was the founding director of the Canadian Library Association (CLA), serving from 1946 to 1968. Under her leadership, the CLA pushed for the creation of Canada's National Library, later Library and Archives Canada. She was also the first editor of The Canadian Library Journal and Feliciter. In 1969, she completed a MA in library science at the University of Chicago Graduate Library School. She worked as a library consultant for the Canadian National Library and was hired by UNESCO to report on library services in Trinidad and Tobago.

Morton was named to the Order of Canada in 1968. In 1969, she was named an honorary Doctor of Laws by the University of Alberta.

In 1970 she was awarded American Library Association Honorary Membership.

She died in Ottawa at the age of 74.

In 1988, the Elizabeth Morton Memorial Fund was established.
