= Howard W. Winger =

American library educator and historian

Howard W. Winger (1914–1995) was an American library educator, historian of books and printing, and dean and professor at the University of Chicago Graduate Library School (GLS).

Winger earned the BA degree from Manchester College and the MLS from the George Peabody College for Teachers. He earned the doctorate from the University of Illinois at Urbana-Champaign.

He joined the University of Chicago Graduate Library School faculty in 1953. He was promoted to professor in 1968. Winger's teaching areas were library history, printing history, and preservation of rare materials. During his tenure at Chicago he also served as Dean of the library school.

Winger organized and edited proceedings from the GLS's annual conferences on topics such as area studies and the library (1965) and deterioration and preservation of library materials (1969).

== Editor of The Library Quarterly ==
Winger was managing editor and editor of the journal, The Library Quarterly, for many years. Of his editing Abraham Bookstein, professor in the Humanities at the University of Chicago noted: "Howard remained a humanist in a graduate school that came to have an increasingly quantitative orientation. An example of this is the fact that for the many years he edited The Library Quarterly, he balanced the journal's often mathematical articles with cover designs featuring drawings of the elegant early printing devices about which he wrote so eloquently. I will always remember the encouragement he gave to me as a young quantitative scholar."

Winger wrote and edited many of the contributions (over 50) to the series, “The Cover Design,” for The Library Quarterly. The series ran for decades appearing on the cover of issues. Examples of the "Cover Design" Winger wrote or edited include Johann Froben, Roelant van den Dorpe, Theodoricus de Borne , John Wolfe, and Johann Walder. The end of the series is explained by new editors.

== Professional Service ==
Winger was founding editorial board member of the Journal of Education for Librarianship and active in the Association of American Library Schools during the mid-twentieth century.

== Selected Publications ==
- Winger, Howard W. (October 1990). "A Salute to Past Editorial Boards". The Library Quarterly. 60 (4). University of Chicago Press: 289–299. doi:10.1086/602262.
- Winger, Howard W. (1976). Printers' Marks and Devices. Chicago: Caxton Club. OCLC 641766104.
- Winger, Howard W., ed. (Summer 1976). "American Library History: 1876-1976". Library Trends. 25 (1). University of Illinois Press.
- Ennis, Philip H.; Winger, Howard W., eds. (1962). Seven Questions about the Profession of Librarianship: The Twenty-Sixth Annual Conference of the Graduate Library School, June 21-23, 1961. Chicago: University of Chicago Press. ISBN 0-226-21027-8.
- Winger, Howard W. (October 1961). "Aspects of Librarianship: A Trace Work of History". The Library Quarterly. 31 (4). University of Chicago Press: 321–335. doi:10.1086/618925.
- Winger, Howard W. (October 1958). "The Exchange of Ideas in the Advancement of Knowledge". The Library Quarterly. 28 (4). University of Chicago Press: 229–238. doi:10.1086/618583.
- Winger, Howard W., ed. (1958). Iron Curtains and Scholarship: The Exchange of Knowledge in a Divided World: Papers Presented before the Twenty-Third Annual Conference of the Graduate Library School of the University of Chicago, July 7-9, 1958. Chicago, Ill.: University of Chicago.
- Winger, Howard W. (July 1956). "Regulations Relating to the Book Trade in London from 1357 to 1586". The Library Quarterly. 26 (3). University of Chicago Press: 157–195. doi:10.1086/618320.
- Winger, Howard W. (1949). Public Library Holdings of Biased Books about Russia. Occasional papers ; no. 1. Urbana: University of Illinois. Graduate School of Library Science.
