= Stephen A. McCarthy =

American librarian (1908–1990)

- Born: Stephen Anthony McCarthy; 1908; Eden Valley, Minnesota, U.S.
- Died: March 18, 1990 (aged 81)
- Education: St. Thomas College; Gonzaga University (BA); University of Chicago (PhD)
- Occupation: Librarian

Stephen Anthony McCarthy (1908 – March 18, 1990) was a notable American librarian and advocate for research libraries. As such, he was named by American Libraries as one of the 100 most influential people in Library Sciences in the last 100 years in 1999.

== Background ==
McCarthy was born in 1908 in Eden Valley, Minnesota and attended St. Thomas College in St. Paul, Minnesota; he earned his BA from Gonzaga University, and his PhD at the University of Chicago Graduate Library School.

== Career ==
Primarily known for his work in academic libraries, he was one time executive director of the Association of Research Libraries. In that role he advised a congressional committee on the 1976 Copyright law about what constituted "fair use" of copyrighted materials. Principally at issue was the proper use of copyrighted materials as regarded photocopying. The ARL joined fifteen other organizations in developing guidelines and advising the Senate committee on the so-called fair use of copyrighted material. McCarthy himself was an important player in advocating the revision of copyright laws, and he also “served on the USOE (US Office of Education) Advisory Committee on the Publication of Copyrighted Materials in 1968 and 1969.”

While he is most recognized for his influence on fair use laws, he was first and foremost a champion of libraries and librarianship. In his lifetime McCarthy served as assistant director of the University of Nebraska Library, assistant director of the Columbia University Library, Director of the Cornell University Libraries, President of the New York Library Association, and President of the Nebraska Library Association. His dedication to good librarianship is made evident by the fact that he initially refused to accept the job as Director of Cornell University Libraries because of the poor condition they were in when he arrived at Ithaca. Eventually, he accepted the job because he was promised that the libraries would be brought up to date and have resources available to make them state of the art. McCarthy himself would play a large role in developing the collection at Cornell and his tenure saw the unification of the 16 campus libraries. He also undertook a major reclassification project at Cornell, moving the cataloguing system from the Harris system to the Library of Congress Catalogue. The Cornell University Library website boasts that it was during his tenure that the Cornell library system became one of the greatest research library systems in the country. They write,

"The staff grew from 70 to 323, while total annual library expenditures increased from about $360,000 to nearly $3.7 million. Some 170,000 volumes were added each year under his administration, compared with about 33,000 annual additions in 1946. Cornell Library’s total collections reached three million volumes by 1967."

The Cornell Library website maintains that his lasting legacy at the university is that he initiated the construction of the Olin Library. McCarthy left a substantial impact on research librarianship as is evidenced by his numerous directorships and committee assignments. He personally advocated financial support for academic and college libraries as he recognized the importance they played in advancing the educational mission of universities. The American Library Association classifies him as one of the most influential librarians in the past 100 years.
