= Frances E. Henne =

American librarian

Frances E Henne
- Born: October 11, 1906; Springfield, Illinois
- Died: December 21, 1985 (aged 79); Greenfield, Massachusetts
- Occupations: Public Librarian, MLIS educator, and author

Frances E. Henne (October 11, 1906 – December 21, 1985) was an American librarian and a long-time professor at the Columbia University School of Library Service. Henne pursued a life of education and became a leader and expert in creating standards for school librarians. In 1999, American Libraries named her one of the "100 Most Important Leaders We Had in the 20th Century."

== Early life and education ==
Henne was born in Springfield, Illinois in October 1906. Henne graduated from the University of Illinois in 1929 with a BA degree, and then went on to receive her master's degree in English in 1934. During her schooling, Henne was introduced to the library profession while working at the Lincoln Public Library.

Once Henne completed her master's degree in English, she ventured to New York City to obtain a bachelor's degree in Librarianship at Columbia University. Simultaneously working at the New York Public Library while completing her education, Henne gained valuable insight and experience that would shape her career and significant contributions to the Library Science field.

After completing her Library schooling, Henne taught in school librarianship at Albany from 1937 to 1939. In 1939 Louis Round Wilson, a dean at the University of Chicago Graduate Library School, invited Henne to teach at the university's graduate library school. Henne accepted the offer, and in doing so, she became the first woman faculty member at the university. Always committed to her studies and pursuing higher education, Henne did not limit her career to teaching at the university. Henne herself wrote, "Education, including professional training, is a life long process." She practiced what she preached and began her doctoral studies in 1939 and obtained her doctorate degree in 1949. Her doctoral studies were focused on school libraries and school library standards, and she continued to focus on school libraries and reshaping and revising standards throughout the rest of her career.

== Library standards and other accomplishments ==
While teaching at the University of Chicago, Henne joined forces with other school library professionals to collaborate on publishing materials to help improve the effectiveness and the quality of school library collections. To help school librarians select and maintain high-quality materials for their libraries, Henne created the Center for Children's Books and published a Bulletin that reviewed children and young adult media.

As a member of the American Association of School Librarians (AASL), Henne worked with other members to create a set of standards for School Libraries so they could become accredited. In 1945 Henne and other Members of the AASL published the very first set of national school library standards.

According to Diane Kester and Plummer Alston Jones Jr., these standards helped to delineate and distinguish the responsibilities of school librarians and public librarians and they pushed for school librarians to work with teachers and educators on "teaching library skills education in the context of subject-based learning".

Henne left the University of Chicago and joined the faculty at the Columbia University School of Library Service in 1954. For over 20 years, she taught and created courses on how to design and implement programming for children and young adults in both the public and school library.

In 1960 she was co-chair of the AASL committee that developed Standards for School Library Programs.

She also promoted librarians who trained both in the education and in library science fields. Henne wrote, "The successful elementary school librarian knows children, likes children, and enjoys working with them…" She believed that not just anyone could run a library successfully.

Henne understood that for children and young adults to fully benefit from school and public libraries, the libraries themselves needed to evolve and change. She saw a need for change in the traditional school libraries of her time. Many libraries during this time focused on building a collection primarily with print materials because parents and administrators did not understand the teaching and educational benefits of non-print materials. Even in the 1960s, Henne was concerned that school and public libraries needed to contain more than just printed books and materials. She realized that new technologies of her time such as 16mm film, filmstrips, and phonograph records were essential to keeping libraries current for educating children and adults alike.

In 1969 she was Henne was the primary leader of the joint AASL-DAVI committee (American Association of School Librarians and Department of Audiovisual Instruction, National Education Association) that issued Standards for School Media Programs.

Henne also believed that children who used and had access to library services achieved more than children who did not. She was frustrated with so many adults and educators who did not see the value or importance of a school library and thus did not put any effort into supporting or funding the library. Henne wrote, "A belief in the school library represents the belief in the right of every boy and girl to have the pleasures, the understandings, and the experiences that come from sharing the best in the recorded impressions and expressions of mankind." To fill the gaps of individual libraries and small schools with very few resources, Henne supported library networks of both school and public libraries. Henne spent the rest of her career advocating for both the school library and the media center. She wrote and published several books and articles on the subject and tried to show the potential of a library that lived up to the recognized standards. Henne wrote in one article that "standards must thus be continuously revised to reflect the changes and to meet the educational needs of the times."

== Legacy ==
In 1963 Frances E. Henne was honored with the Joseph W. Lippincott Award. She received a special citation in 1976 at the centennial of the American Library Association.

Henne died on December 21, 1985, at the age of 79 after suffering from Lou Gehrig's disease. Even though no family survived her death, Henne's legacy has lived on in the world of School Libraries. A year after her death, the American Association of School Librarians set up the AASL Frances Henne Award. According to AASL, the award "recognizes a school library media specialist with five years or less experience who demonstrates leadership qualities with students, teachers and administrators." Recipients of this award are given funds to travel to their first AASL conference or ALA Annual. Even after her death, Henne is helping librarians further their education and stay current in their field. Henne recognized the fact that continual education and self-improvement was essential to librarians in helping them keep libraries constantly evolving to meet the needs of patrons.

== Selected Publications ==
- Henne, Frances (1976). The Library World and the Publishing of Children's Books. R.R. Bowker memorial lectures. New series ; no. 3. New York: R. R. Bowker Company.
- Henne, Frances E. (1975). "Content versus container orientation". Library Quarterly. 45: 13–26.
- Henne, Frances E. (1962). "Commentary on a Shavian conundrum". Journal of Education for Librarianship. 2: 191–197.
- Henne, Frances E. (1960). "Toward excellence in school-library programs". Library Quarterly. 30: 75–90.
- Ersted, R.; Henne, Frances E.; Henne, Frances E. (1960). "On using standards for school library programs". ALA Bulletin. 54: 124–129.
- Henne, Frances E. (1955). "Basic need in library service for youth". Library Quarterly. 25: 37–46.
- Henne, Frances; Ersted, Ruth; Lohrer, Alice (1951). A Planning Guide for the High School Library Program. Chicago: American Library Association.
- Henne, Frances E.; Lowell, M. M. (1942). "Preparation of secondary-school teachers in the use of library materials". Library Quarterly. 12: 533–556.
