= Herbert Goldhor =

Library science scholar (1917–2011)

- Born: February 8, 1917
- Died: 2011
- Education: University of Chicago, PhD
- Occupations: Professor, author, librarian

Herbert Goldhor (February 8, 1917 – March 29, 2011) was Director and Professor at the School of Information Sciences (University of Illinois Urbana-Champaign).

== Education and career ==
Herbert Goldhor was born in Newark, New Jersey in 1917. He received his B.A. from Rutgers University and a B.S. in Library Science from Columbia University in 1938. His first professional position was assistant to the librarian at Iowa State College.

He earned the PhD from the University of Chicago Graduate Library School in 1943. His dissertation was on "The Selection of Employees in Large Civil Service and Non-Civil Service Public Libraries."

He served in the U.S. Army in World War II, primarily in the European Theater from 1944 to 1946, where he rose to the rank of Second Lieutenant. His military role involved library-related activities, including the training of soldier-librarians to support educational and recreational services for troops following the D-Day invasion in June 1944. In a 1947 article Goldhor detailed this experience describing how he helped establish and lead training programs for enlisted personnel to manage army libraries in liberated areas like Paris by late August 1944.

After military service, Goldhor joined the Library School faculty of the University of Illinois at Urbana- Champaign from 1946 to 1951. While at Illinois he was the editor of the Occasional Papers series and published the first of many trend-line indexes. The "Occasional Papers" series is a venue for disseminating in-depth scholarly works on librarianship, too lengthy, detailed, or specialized for standard periodical publication.

In 1952, Goldhor moved to Indiana to become the chief librarian of the Evansville Vanderburgh Public Library.

He returned to the University of Illinois to direct the Graduate School of Library Science from 1962 to 1978. He coordinated and edited the 1963 Clinic on Library Applications of Data Processing.

In 1975 Goldhor was appointed director of the school's Library Research Center. He published the "University of Illinois Annual Survey" (also referred to as the Annual Survey of Public Library Circulation or Annual Indexes for a Sample of American Public Libraries) annually in American Libraries, the magazine of the American Library Association. The survey tracked national trends in public library circulation and expenditures with data indexed to a 1980 base of 100. The series was published from 1974 to 1988.

Goldhor was director of the Library Research Center until his retirement in 1987. A festschrift published in his honor emphasized his contributions to public library service and administration, data collection, and scientific research in librarianship.

Herbert Goldhor died March 29, 2011.

== Awards and honors ==
- Krikelas, James; Bunge, Charles A. (Fall 1989). "Herbert Goldhor: A Tribute and Bibliography". Library Trends. 38 (2): 295–312.
- Powell, Ronald R. (Fall 1989). "Problem Solving in Libraries: A Festschrift in Honor of Herbert Goldhor". Library Trends. 38 (2): 150–325.
- 1988 Melvil Dewey Medal - American Library Association for "his contribution to library education, his gathering and analysis of statistics, and his leadership in library administration and professional associations"
- 1987 Librarian of the Year- Illinois Library Association

== Selected publications ==
- Wheeler, Joseph L.; Goldhor, Herbert; Rochell, Carlton C. (1981). Wheeler and Goldhor's Practical Administration of Public Libraries (Rev. ed. / completely rev. by Carlton Rochell ed.). New York: Harper & Row. ISBN 0060136014.
- Goldhor, Herbert (1981). Fact Book of the American Public Library. Occasional Papers. Champaign, IL: University of Illinois, Graduate School of Library and Information Science.
- Goldhor, Herbert; Summers, Janice (1981). Special Libraries Serving State Governments. Contractor report (National Center for Education Statistics). Urbana, Illinois: University of Illinois Graduate School of Library Science.
- Goldhor, Herbert (1972). An Introduction to Scientific Research in Librarianship. Urbana, IL: University of Illinois, Graduate School of Library Science. ISBN 9780878450367.
- Goldhor, Herbert, ed. (1971). Education for Librarianship: The Design of the Curriculum of Library Schools. Urbana: University of Illinois, Graduate School of Library Science. ISBN 0-87845-033-5.
- Goldhor, Herbert, ed. (1963). Proceedings of the Clinic on Library Applications of Data Processing. Urbana, IL: University of Illinois, Graduate School of Library Science.
- Wheeler, Joseph L.; Goldhor, Herbert (1962). Practical Administration of Public Libraries. New York: Harper & Row. ISBN 9780060136017.
- Goldhor, Herbert; Sahm, Lawrence A. (1961). The Renovation of a Medium-Sized Public Library Building. Urbana: N.p.
- Goldhor, Herbert, ed. (1953). Current Trends in Public Libraries. Urbana, IL: University of Illinois Library School.
- Goldhor, Herbert, ed. (1951). Retirement for Librarians: Principles of a Good Plan with Extended Comment on Typical Public and Private Systems. Chicago: American Library Association.
- Goldhor, Herbert (July 1947). "The Training of Soldier Librarians in the European Theater". Library Quarterly. 17 (3): 171–184.
- Goldhor, Herbert (July 1943). "Civil Service in Public Libraries". Library Quarterly. 13 (3): 187–211.
