= Maurice Tauber =

American librarian and educator

Maurice Falcom Tauber
- Born: February 14, 1908; Norfolk, Virginia
- Died: September 21, 1980 (aged 72); New York, New York
- Occupations: Technical Services Librarian, Professor, Author, Researcher

Maurice Falcom Tauber (February 14, 1908 – September 21, 1980) was an influential librarian, educator and researcher in the field of library and information sciences; he was a major actor in how technical services units in American and in international libraries were thought of and how they evolved in the 20th century. Tauber is remembered especially for his role as professor and mentor during his long tenure at Columbia University from 1944 to 1976.

In 1999, American Libraries named him one of the "100 Most Important Leaders We Had in the 20th Century".

== Biography ==
Tauber was born in Virginia in 1908, where he lived until 1925. His father, a tailor, died when Tauber was just six years old, and Tauber worked for a couple of newspapers throughout his school years. The family moved to Philadelphia in 1925, where Tauber completed high school and began to study at Temple University. He obtained a BA from both Temple University (in English and Education) and from Columbia University, where he studied cataloging and classification.

In 1932, Tauber married Rose Begner, and they had two sons together. He continued on for a graduate degree at Temple University, completing a master's program in sociology, and went on to complete a PhD at the University of Chicago Graduate Library School in 1941. After completing his studies, Tauber joined the library at the University of Chicago as Head Cataloguer and soon thereafter became Chief of the Preparations Department.

In 1942 he was invited to join the faculty of the Library Graduate School at the University of Chicago, where he remained until 1944. He returned to his alma mater Columbia University in 1944 to lead the Technical Services Division in the position of assistant director of Columbia University Libraries and to teach in the School of Library Service.

Tauber gave up the title of assistant director of CUL when he became a full-time professor. He taught until 1976 and died on September 21, 1980.

== Career ==
While Tauber was well-versed in all aspects of library service, he focused on cataloging and classification in his early career. His dissertation (1941) was entitled: Reclassification and Recataloging in University Libraries. One of Tauber's early seminal monographs was The University Library; Its Organization, Administration and Functions, co-authored with his mentor, Louis Round Wilson from the University of Chicago, and published in 1945. The authors collected and presented a wide range of information and issues about university libraries in a comprehensive and logical fashion. This book helped establish Tauber as a serious researcher and scholar in library sciences. The revision of this book, published in 1956, was received with similar interest in the library community, as the volume addressed more contemporary issues of importance for librarians, administrators, and university leaders alike. Tauber concentrated on many aspects of library services in this book, but was particularly responsible for the sections regarding technical services. Later on he focused his intellectual curiosity more fully on technical services and immersed himself in the development of teaching materials and research on technical services and their importance. In addition to these main areas, Tauber contributed to the field with his studies on library building design and biographies of significant librarians of his time.

=== Technical services ===
Tauber is credited with writing another one of the classic works in librarianship, Technical Services in Libraries: Acquisitions, Cataloging, Classification, Binding, Photographic Reproduction, and Circulation Operations, published in 1953. In this volume he defines technical services to be “the services involving the operations and techniques for acquiring, recording, and preserving materials (which) are among the oldest aspects of librarianship,” and states that the term ‘technical’ “… denote(s) that certain operations which are usually carried on away from the public desks are likely to be more susceptible to codification than those of the readers' departments”. As such, technical services has come to be understood as a set of operations, performed away from "direct public contact," including “a) selection, b) acquisition, c) cataloging, d) physical processing, and e) circulation”. He was a strong advocate for the centralization of technical services in libraries and promoted this position in his publications.

=== Teaching and research ===
Tauber was a professor and teacher in library studies; students described him as “patient, generous, and kind”. Outside of the classroom he mentored graduate students and served on several graduate student committees, devoting time and effort to ensure the success of the students in the library program. He was a member of the faculty and has been remembered in memoirs and other articles by his colleagues.

In addition to his successful teaching career, Tauber was an active researcher, writing numerous monographs, reports, articles, reviews, and biographies. He carried out more than 50 independent and collaborative surveys of libraries in the United States and abroad, including Tokyo, Hong Kong, Singapore, and Australia. The surveys were conducted primarily in academic libraries, and Tauber's contributions to the surveys usually focused specifically on technical services or on library building planning and design. A biobibliography of his complete works was published in 1974.

Tauber also served the library community in other ways: He was an editor for many years of College & Research Libraries and served on editorial boards for Library Resources & Technical Services, Journal of Cataloging and Classification, American Documentation, and the Journal of Higher Education. He was also the chief editor for a short time period of Library Trends.

=== Honors and legacy ===
As an educator, 10 years after his return to Columbia University Tauber was named the Melvil Dewey Professor of Library Service for his academic service and for his curriculum and research development. He held a long affiliation with the American Library Association, serving in various capacities, such as his membership on the council and executive board.

Other honors include receiving the Margaret Mann citation in 1953 Resources and Technical Services Division of the ALA, a special Association of college and University Librarians award, recognition by Beta Phi Mu, and the Melvil Dewey Medal in 1954.

In 1968 he was awarded the Distinguished Service Award from Findley College Library in Ohio for “his outstanding contribution to higher education as a teacher, writer, librarian, critic, and leader in the science of library service”. In 1981, a year after his death, friends and colleagues established the Maurice F. Tauber Foundation in New York City; the Foundation supports various lectures, publications and presents an annual award for “excellence in library and information science”.

== Selected Publications ==
For a complete list of publications see Maurice Falcolm Tauber: A Biobibliography, 1934–1973

- Tauber, Maurice F. (March 1942). "Subject Cataloging and Classification Approaching the Crossroads". College & Research Libraries. 3 (2): 149–156. doi:10.5860/crl_03_02_149. hdl:2142/31602.
- Tauber, Maurice F. (1954) [1953]. Technical Services in Libraries: Acquisitions, Cataloging, Classification, Binding, Photographic Reproduction, and Circulation Operations. Columbia University Studies in Library Service. New York: Columbia University Press. pp. xvi, 487. ISBN 0231020546.
- Wilson, Louis Round; Tauber, Maurice F. (1956). The University Library: The Organization, Administration, and Functions of Academic Libraries. Columbia University Studies in Library Service (2nd ed.). New York: Columbia University Press. pp. xiii, 641. OCLC 574867.
- Tauber, Maurice F.; Frarey, Carlyle J. (1960). Cataloging and Classification. By Maurice F. Tauber. Subject Headings. By Carlyle J. Frarey. The State of the Library Art. Vol. 1. New Brunswick, NJ: Graduate School of Library Service, Rutgers, the State University. pp. 271, 92. LCCN 60007278.
- Tauber, Maurice F. (Summer 1964). "Survey Method in Approaching Library Problems". Library Trends. 13 (1): 15–30. ISSN 0024-2594.
