= Gordon Roland Williams =

American librarian (1914–1996)

- First five volumes of the National Union Catalog: Pre-1956 Imprints. Williams is second from the left.
- Born: Gordon Roland Williams; July 26, 1914; Ontario, Oregon, U.S.
- Died: September 15, 1996 (aged 82); Napa, California, U.S.
- Education: Stanford University (A.B.); University of Chicago Graduate Library School (M.A.)
- Occupation: Librarian
- Known for: Director of the Center for Research Libraries; role in the National Union Catalog Pre-1956 Imprints
- Spouse: Jane Margaret Smith (m. 1942)
- Children: 1 daughter

Gordon Roland Williams (1914–1996) was an American librarian who was director of the Center for Research Libraries (CRL) in Chicago and instrumental in publication of the National Union Catalog.

== Education and Career ==
Gordon Roland Williams (July 26, 1914 – September 15, 1996) was born in Ontario, Oregon. He earned the A.B.at Stanford University (A.B.), attended the University of Oregon, and the University of Chicago Graduate Library School where he earned the library degree (M.A.).

During the Second World War he served in the U.S. Navy in the Pacific, becoming an expert navigator; proximity to heavy naval artillery left him with tinnitus that persisted later in life.

After the war he returned to California as vice-president of the international bookselling firm Brentano's, managing its Los Angeles shop. Williams entered professional librarianship in 1950 as executive assistant to the librarian at the John Crerar Library in Chicago. In 1952 he became chief assistant (or assistant) librarian at the University of California, Los Angeles (UCLA) Library.

In 1959 Williams was appointed director of the Midwest Inter-Library Center (which became the Center for Research Libraries). He held the position until his retirement in 1980.

He also served on the board of the Association of Research Libraries (1965–1968).

== National Union Catalog: Pre-1956 Imprints ==
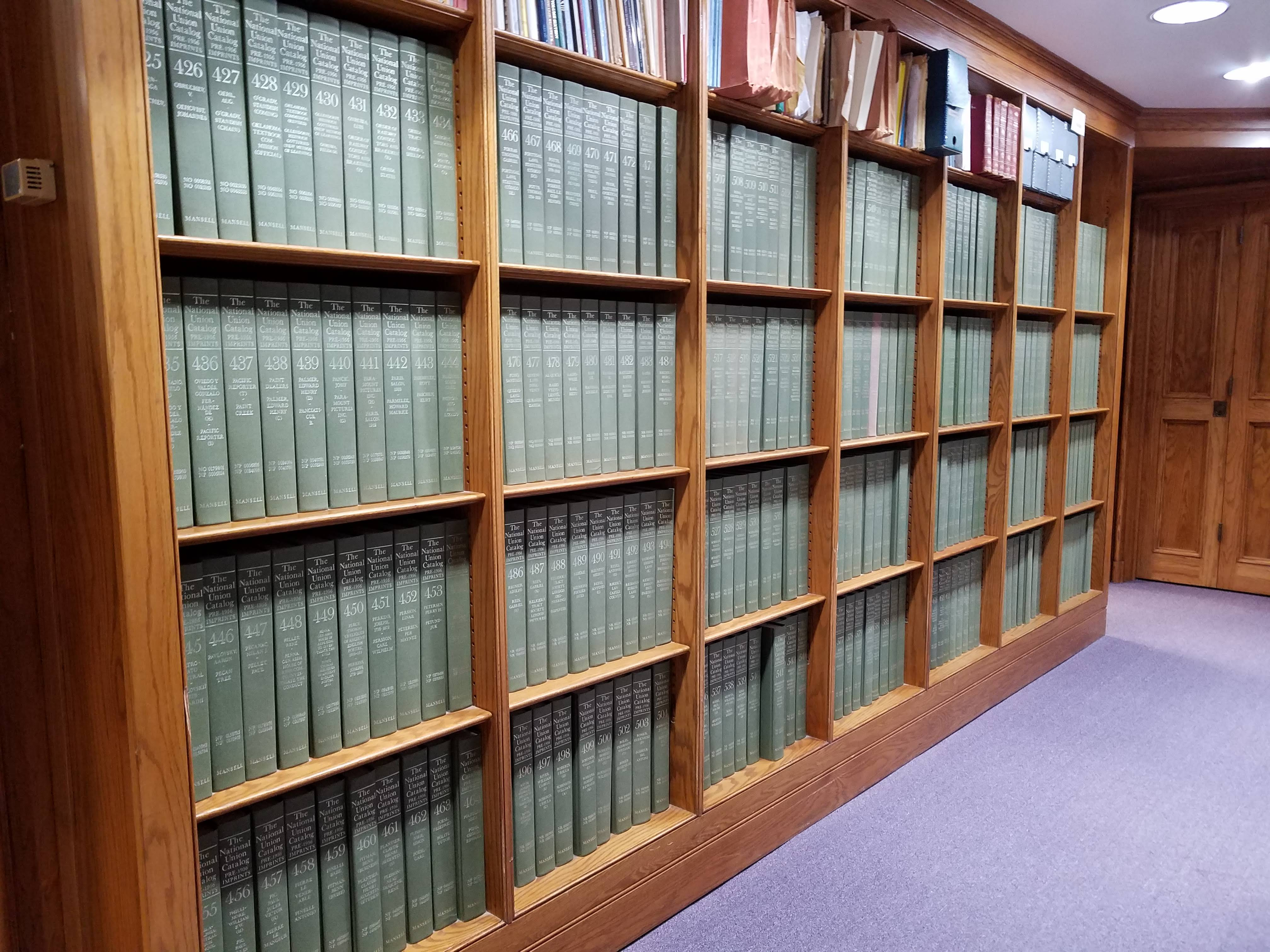
NUC-Folger

Williams was chair of the American Library Association Resources and Technical Services Division Resources Committee's Subcommittee on the National Union Catalog. The National Union Catalog: Pre-1956 Imprints (often called the Mansell catalog after its publisher) appeared in 754 volumes between 1968 and 1981.

Drawing on records from hundreds of North American research libraries, the National Union Catalog: Pre-1956 Imprints provided location information for millions of pre-1956 imprints and fulfilled a long-standing vision of a comprehensive national union catalog. Williams managed the administrative, editorial, and collaborative challenges—including coordination with the British publisher Mansell and the Library of Congress. By the time of his retirement the set was complete. It is a foundational reference tool for libraries worldwide.

Williams wrote and edited works reflecting his bibliographical and printing interests.

Williams died at his home in Napa, California on September 15, 1996.

== Selected publications ==
- Williams, Gordon (October 1964). "The Librarian's Role in the Development of Library Book Collections". The Library Quarterly. 34 (4): 308–317.
- Williams, Gordon Roland (December 1965). "Library Cooperation: Key to Greater Resources". Special Libraries. 56: 565–570.
- Williams, Gordon R. (September 1971). "Physical Access to Library Materials". PMLA. 86 (4): 590–593.
- Williams, Gordon R. (1968). "History of the National Union Catalog, Pre-1956 Imprints". National Union Catalog, Pre-1956 Imprints. Vol. 1. London: Mansell. pp. vii–x.
- Williams, Gordon R. (1980). "The Function and Methods of Libraries in the Diffusion of Knowledge". The Library Quarterly: Information, Community, Policy. 50 (1): 58–75.
- Williams, Gordon R. (1981). "The National Union Catalog and Research Libraries". In Cole, John Y. (ed.). In Celebration: The National Union Catalog, Pre-1956 Imprints. Washington, DC: Library of Congress. pp. 14–20.
