= Alice I. Bryan =

American psychologist and library science scholar

- Born: September 11, 1902; Kearny, New Jersey, US
- Died: October 20, 1992 (aged 90); Manhattan, New York, US
- Education: Columbia University; University of Chicago
- Occupations: Psychologist, professor

Alice I. Bryan (September 11, 1902 – October 20, 1992) was an American psychologist who worked at the intersection of psychology and librarianship. Her research documented discrimination against women in their careers. Bryan was the founder of the National Council of Women Psychologists and the first female full professor at the Columbia University School of Library Service.

== Early life and education ==
Alice Isabel Bever was born in Kearny, New Jersey on September 11, 1902. She was educated at home and entered high school early. She began working as a substitute teacher during her last year in high school due to a teacher shortage during World War I.

Bryan earned three degrees in psychology at Columbia University: a bachelor's degree in 1929, a master's degree in 1930 and a Ph.D. in 1934. Her doctoral dissertation was based on a study of the relationship between memory and intelligence in five-year-old children.

== Research and scholarship ==
After earning her Ph.D., Bryan worked in a number of part-time teaching positions, including at Sarah Lawrence College and Pratt Institute. In 1939 she joined the Columbia University School of Library Service as an assistant professor. Bryan published articles at the intersection of librarianship and psychology, with topics including research methods and interview techniques.

Bryan was considered an expert in the field of bibliotherapy and helped define the specialty during the 1930s. As opposed to other professionals who described bibliotherapy only as treatment for the sick, Bryan suggested it could serve as a preventative measure "to develop emotional maturity and nourish and sustain mental health."

At the beginning of World War II, female psychologists were concerned that only male psychologists were represented on the Emergency Committee in Psychology, which was formed to oversee the mobilization of psychologists in the war effort. Bryan founded the National Council of Women Psychologists in 1940, leading the inaugural meeting in her own apartment. The organization later became the International Council of Women Psychologists. Throughout her career, Bryan volunteered in leadership roles in multiple organizations, including working to revise the bylaws of the American Psychological Association and serving as the executive secretary of the American Association for Applied Psychology.

Bryan took sabbaticals from her role at Columbia to continue her education, including earning her master's in library science from the University of Chicago Graduate Library School in 1951. She was recruited to conduct a study of library workers for the Public Library Inquiry, with funding from the Social Science Research Council. The resulting book The Public Librarian, published in 1952, was based on interviews with more than 3,000 librarians in 60 libraries across the United States. The study's findings included inadequate and inequitable salaries, as well as the fact that the vast majority of librarians were women but there was little representation of women at the director level.

In 1956 Bryan was the first woman to become a full professor at Columbia's School for Library Service. She continued her research as well as teaching research methodology; additionally she helped create the school's doctoral program and chaired the doctoral committee. Bryan retired in 1971 and was named professor emerita.

She died on October 20, 1992, in Manhattan, New York.

In 1994 a memorial collection honoring Alice Bryan, including tributes from colleagues and students at Columbia University was published in the journal, Libraries & Culture.
