= Lucia J. Rather =

American librarian

Past Director of Cataloging at the Library of Congress
- In office 1976–1991

Personal details
- Occupation: Librarian
- Committees: International Federation of Libraries Association

Lucia Porcher Johnson Rather (1934 - 2023) was a librarian whose work included serving as the Director of Cataloging at the Library of Congress. She received the American Library Association's Medal of Excellence for her work cataloging in the Library of Congress. She also worked with the International Federation of Libraries Associations, primarily on the role of cataloging in library science.

== Early life and education ==
On September 12, 1934, Rather was born as Lucia Porcher Johnson in Durham, North Carolina. Rather was born to parents Cecil Johnson, a History professor at the University of North Carolina at Chapel Hill and the eventual Dean of the General College, and Lucia Johnson, who worked on botanical paintings also at the University of North Carolina at Chapel Hill. During her youth, Rather began experiencing progressive hearing loss that would continue throughout the rest of her life.

Rather spent the first two years of her secondary education attending Westhampton College in Richmond, Virginia, before transferring to the University of North Carolina at Chapel Hill, where she graduated with a B.A. in History in 1955. After completing her first secondary education degree, she attended the School of Information and Library Science at the University of North Carolina, where she earned a M.S. in Library Science in 1957. Shortly after graduating, Rather moved to Washington D.C. and began working at the Library of Congress. She later returned to school and earned a Ph.D. in History from George Washington University.

== Career ==
Rather began her career working in the Library of Congress in 1957, serving initially as a cataloger. Almost a decade into this role, she married the assistant chief of the division, so she switched departments and began working in reference for a while before an opening appeared in a new automation program at the library. When working in her new position, Rather largely served as a systems analyst, but in 1968, Rather joined a leadership team, headed by Henriette Avram, which was working on creating the MARC standards. Rather would later credit Avram for having an important influence on her career. Rather's primary contribution to MARC was by working on the character set that could help to represent any Roman alphabet language that was cataloged in its original form; this feature helped it become an international standard because it could more easily process non-English languages.

In 1976, after working in several different roles at the Library of Congress, Rather was appointed to be the Director of Cataloging, a position she held until her retirement in 1991. In this position, she helped the Library of Congress implement new cataloging standards. She also worked on classification policies and overall helped to manage one of the largest departments in the Library of Congress. Furthermore, throughout the 1980s, Rather often served as the acting Deputy Librarian of Congress.

In addition to her work in the Library of Congress, Rather also played a role in the International Federation of Libraries, heading multiple different committees as the field reckoned with upheaval in cataloging. In the later years of her life, Rather taught classes at Washington College Academy for Lifelong Learning, and analyzed the political cartoon collection at the Library of Congress.

On November 8th, 2023, at age 89, Rather passed away in Chestertown, Maryland.

== Honors and awards ==
- 1985 American Library Association's Margaret Mann Citation Award
- 1991 American Library Association Melvil Dewey Award
- 1991 American Library Association's Medal of Excellence
- 1991 Library of Congress Distinguished Service Award
- 1992 University of North Carolina School of Information and Library Science Distinguished Alumni Award
- 2021 Washington College Academy for Lifelong Learning George Award

== Selected publications ==
- Avram, Henriette D; Rather, Lucia J; Knapp, John F (1968), The MARC II format : a communications format for bibliographic data, Information Systems Office, Library of Congress
- Avram, Henriette D.; Crosby, Alan S.; Pennington, Jerry G.; Rather, John C.; Rather, Lucia J.; Whitmer, Arlene (1969-12-01). "MARC Program Research and Development: A Progress Report". Information Technology and Libraries. 2 (4): 242–265. doi:10.6017/ital.v2i4.4667. ISSN 2163-5226.
- Avram, Henriette D.; Rather, Lucia J. (1974-09-01). "Principles of Format Design". Information Technology and Libraries. 7 (3): 161–167. doi:10.6017/ital.v7i3.8948. ISSN 2163-5226.
- Rather, Lucia J. (1980). "Section on Cataloguing". IFLA Journal. 6 (3): 211–213. doi:10.1177/034003528000600304. ISSN 0340-0352.
- Rather, L. J., & Wiggins, B. (1989). MARC: Mrs. Avram’s Remarkable Contribution. American Libraries, 20(9).

== Personal life ==
While in Washington D.C., Rather met John Carson Rather, and the two wed in 1964.
