= John M. Cory =

American librarian (1914–1988)

John Mackenzie Cory
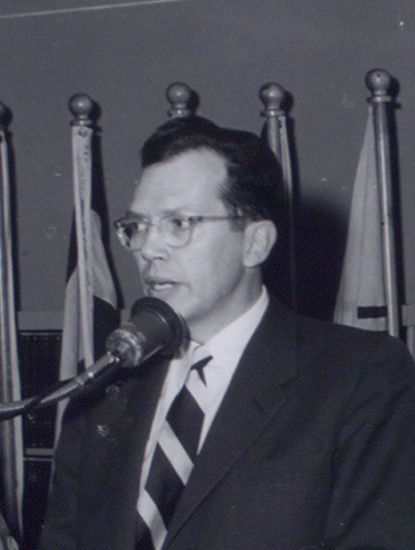
- Cory in 1956
- Born: January 13, 1914; Asheville, North Carolina, US
- Died: April 14, 1988 (aged 74); Tarrytown, New York, US
- Education: University of California, Berkeley; University of Chicago Graduate Library School
- Occupation: Librarian
- Employer(s): New York Public Library; American Library Association

John Mackenzie Cory (January 13, 1914 – April 13, 1988) was an American librarian. He served as executive secretary of the American Library Association from 1948 to 1951 and director of the New York Public Library from 1971 to 1978. During his tenure, the Mid-Manhattan Library, the New York Public Library for the Performing Arts, and the Schomburg Center for Research in Black Culture opened to the public.

== Life and career ==
Cory was born in Asheville, North Carolina, on January 13, 1914, and grew up in New York and California. He received a B.A. degree in history in 1936 and a certificate in librarianship in 1937 from the University of California, Berkeley. After working briefly as a librarian at UC Berkeley, Cory went on to graduate from the University of Chicago Graduate Library School and embarked on a career in library administration.

Cory worked as library director at the University of Alabama from 1940 to 1942 and went on to spend a year as Senior Public Library Specialist in the United States Office of Education. He concluded his wartime service as Chief of the Library Program Division with the U.S. Office of War Information, holding the rank of chief warrant officer with the U.S. Air Transport Command from 1943 to 1945. In 1946, Cory received the Legion of Merit. He then worked as Associate Librarian at UC Berkeley from 1945 to 1948 and as Executive Secretary of the American Library Association (ALA) from 1948 to 1951.

Cory began his 30-year career at the New York Public Library (NYPL) in 1951, when he became Chief of the Circulation Department, overseeing 80 branch libraries across Manhattan, the Bronx, and Staten Island. He served as president of the New York Library Association in 1956. From 1963 to 1970, Cory served as NYPL's Deputy Director, working with director Edward Geier Freehafer to administer both the public service and the research divisions of the library. From January 1971 to August 1978, he served as Director of NYPL. During his tenure, the Mid-Manhattan Library, the New York Public Library for the Performing Arts, and Schomburg Center for Research in Black Culture opened to the public. Cory also established the Systems Analysis & Data Processing Office, which led initiatives for library automation, and he oversaw austerity measures during the 1970s in response to high inflation and funding cuts from the City. From 1966 to 1970, he served double-duty as Executive Director of the Metropolitan Reference and Research Library Agency, a library cooperative based at NYPL at the time. He also taught classes as an adjunct professor at Columbia University School of Library Service for more than 30 years. Cory retired in 1978 and worked as a library consultant in 1984 until he died of a heart attack in Tarrytown, New York, at the age of 74.

Cory married journalist Jeanne Tinneman on August 17, 1940. The couple had four children before divorcing. He married Patricia O'Connell Blair on August 22, 1951. After his second wife's death, Cory married Rosella Murray, an NYPL staff member.

He was a member of the Grolier Club.
