= Hwa-Wei Lee =

- Born: January 25, 1931; Guangzhou, China
- Died: December 17, 2023 (aged 92); Jacksonville, Florida
- Occupation: chief of the Asian Division at the Library of Congress
- Spouse: Mary Kratochvil
- Awards: ALA Medal of Excellence

Academic background
- Education: University of Pittsburgh, Carnegie Mellon University, National Taiwan Normal University

Academic work
- Discipline: Education, Library Science
- Institutions: Ohio University, Library of Congress

Hwa-Wei Lee (January 25, 1931 - December 17, 2023) was Dean of Ohio University Libraries from 1978 to 1999 and chief of the Asian Division at the Library of Congress from 2003 to 2008.

== Early life and education ==
Hwa-Wei Lee was born on January 25, 1931, in Guangzhou, China to his mother Xiao-Hui Wang and his father Kan-Chun Lee. He was the third born of seven children. At the time of his birth, his father was the governor of Shihui County in Guangdong Province. During the 1930s and 1940s he traveled and lived in multiple places due to war and natural disasters. Places he lived included Nanjing, Guilin, and Chongqing in China, Haiphong in Vietnam, and Taichung, Taiwan. In Taiwan he completed high school and graduated from the National Taiwan Normal University. Post graduation, he completed just over a year of ROTC training and was commissioned as a first lieutenant reserve officer. He took an examination to study abroad and he attended the University of Pittsburgh to complete his master's degree in education. It was there that he met his future wife Mary Kratochvil. Lee and Kratochvil married on March 14, 1959, in Jeannette, Pennsylvania.

Lee furthered his education by attending Carnegie Mellon University, from which he graduated in 1961 with a master's in library science, and then he received his PhD in education from the University of Pittsburgh in 1965.

== Career ==
During his education at Carnegie Mellon ad the University of Pittsburgh, Lee worked as an Assistant librarian at the University Pittsburgh Libraries from 1959 to 1962. He was then the Head of Technical Services at Duquesne University Library in Pittsburgh from 1962 to 1965. After which he became Head of the Library at the University of Pennsylvania in Edinboro from 1965 to 1968. In 1968 he became the Director of the library and information center at the Asian Institute of Technology in Bangkok, Thailand where he worked until 1975. From 1975 to 1978 he was back in the United States and worked as the associate director of Libraries and Professor of Library Administration at Colorado State University in Fort Collins.

In 1978 Lee became the Dean of Ohio University Libraries where he held the position until 1999, after which he became Dean Emeritus. Under his guidance the Libraries achieved membership in the Association of Research Libraries. Lee advanced library technology when he spearheaded a proposal to establish an integrated computer-automated library system that would aid in cataloging library resources and circulation tasks and he was a founding member and advisor to the statewide system OhioLINK.

At Ohio University Lee developed international collections for Southeast Asian Studies and in 1979 he created an internship program that brought librarians from Africa, Asia, the Middle East and Central America to Ohio University. He also founded the University Libraries’ Shao You-Bao Center for Overseas Chinese Documentation and Research. Lee excelled at fundraising and endowments during his time in the libraries grew to over $8 million, and grants received were valued at over $2.5 million.

When he retired in 1999 the Hwa-Wei Lee Library Annex was named in his honor as was the first floor of the main library at Ohio University becoming the Hwa-Wei Lee Center for International Collections.

Lee went on to continue his career as a distinguished visiting scholar at the Online Computer Library Center (OCLC) from 2000 to 2002. And in 2003 became the chief of the Asian division at the Library of Congress where he continued to work until 2008.

During his career Lee authored or co-authored six books and 130 papers on library and information science. This includes a two-volume set of his Collected Works published by Sun Yat-sen University Press (Guangzhou, China: 2011) and his biography titled “The Sage in the Cathedral of Books,” also published in 2011. In 2016 his biography was translated into English and re-published by the Ohio University Press.

== Awards ==
- Medal of Appreciation from Her Royal Highness Princess Maha Chakri Sirindhorn of Thailand (2018)
- Outstanding Library Leadership Award, in memory of Dr. Margaret Chang Fung, from the Chinese American Librarians Association (2016)
- ALA Medal of Excellence by the American Library Association to honor his lifetime of achievement in the field (2015)
- Honorary Doctor of Letters Degree from Ohio University (2012)
- Ohio Hall of Fame Librarian (1999)
- ALA John Ames Humphrey Award for Contributions to International Librarianship (1991)
- APALA's Distinguished Services Award (1991)
- Ohio Librarian of the Year (1987)
- Outstanding Administrator of Ohio University (1983)
- CALA's Distinguished Services Award (1983)

== External resources ==
- The Life of Dr. Hwa-Wei Lee: A Scholar, A Library Leader, An Ambassador (李華偉博士之旅：學者，圖書館界泰斗，文化使者)
