= Classic Arts Showcase =

American fine arts television channel

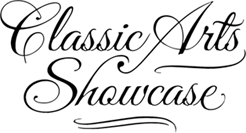
- Country: United States
- Headquarters: Burbank, California

Ownership
- Owner: The Lloyd E. Rigler – Lawrence E. Deutsch Foundation

History
- Launched: May 3, 1994; 31 years ago

Links
- Website: www.classicartsshowcase.org

Availability

Streaming media
- Streaming: Watch online

Classic Arts Showcase (CAS) is a television channel in the United States promoting the fine arts. The television program content includes prepared media and recorded live performances. It is a 24-hour non-commercial satellite channel broadcasting a mix of various classic arts including animation, architectural art, ballet, chamber, choral music, dance, folk art, museum art, musical theatre, opera, orchestral, recital, solo instrumental, solo vocal, and theatrical play, as well as classic film and archival documentaries.

== Description ==
Self-described on its web site as "Classical MTV", the channel features renowned artists, both professional and amateur, as well as many rare and independent performances and videos. An 8-hour mix of video clips is prepared weekly and broadcast three times daily. Text displayed on the screen provides details about the recording, and encourages viewers to gain inspiration and "...go out and feast from the buffet of arts available in your community." The explanation for not providing a schedule is they feel that surprise is an effective tactic to encourage the public to see that which is not familiar to them.

CAS launched on May 3, 1994 and is completely funded by the Lloyd E. Rigler – Lawrence E. Deutsch Foundation. It does not solicit any outside funding. Lloyd Rigler died in 2003, but left at least twenty years of funding to the channel. As of 2020, CAS states that there remains enough funding to maintain the channel "for decades to come." CAS is offered free to any broadcaster, or public, educational, and government access (PEG) channel on a cable television system that requests a feed, as well as direct-to-consumer via an Internet feed on the channel's Web site and through a Roku app. CAS is shown on more than 500 channels in the United States, as well as some in Canada. CAS does not publish information about channels in other countries.

== Reception ==
The Kansas City Star television critic Aaron Barnhart has commented that "many of the selections are beyond the familiar – Pavarotti singing the Ave Maria,' I Musici belting out a 'Four Seasons' suite – but [...] there are no annoying commercials or announcers to disrupt the relaxing ambiance on this TV channel." He wrote further, "Classical-music lovers will find it hard not to get roped in by the mix of ballet, operatic singing and instrumental pieces, most of them culled from old film stock or European music videos."

American art critic Alan Klevit, in a chapter of his book The Art Beat, praises the programming available on Classic Arts Showcase, and, having the television channel in mind, explains that his "favorite show is not a show," but is, in fact, "a montage of videos spanning the arts." Klevit quips that CAS is "habit-forming", and confides that he is often "unwilling to turn the set off, for fear of missing a Buster Keaton vignette, or perhaps Lillian Gish, or Arturo Toscanini conducting the NBC Symphony Orchestra, Rudolph Valentino as The Sheik, or some other classic [he] will treasure."

== See also ==
- Quality television
- Art film
- Art music
