= Center for Research Libraries =

North American library consortium

- Formerly: Midwest Inter-Library Center
- Type: Consortium
- Industry: Library Science
- Founded: 1949
- Headquarters: Chicago, Illinois, United States
- Area served: Worldwide
- Key people: Jacob Nadal (President)
- Revenue: 9,213,563 United States dollar (2022)
- Total assets: 31,149,356 United States dollar (2022)
- Website: crl.edu

The Center for Research Libraries (also known by its acronym, CRL) is a consortium of North American universities, colleges, and independent research libraries, based on a buy-in concept for membership of the consortia. The consortium acquires and preserves traditional and digital resources for research and teaching and makes them available to member institutions through interlibrary loan and electronic delivery. It also gathers and analyzes data pertaining to the preservation of physical and digital resources, and fosters the sharing of expertise, in order to assist member libraries in maintaining their collections.

The Center for Research Libraries was founded in 1949, as the Midwest Inter-Library Center (MILC). The traditional role of CRL was as an aggregator of tangible collection materials; however, this focus has been updated in the digital age into the CRL's current role as a facilitator of collection development, digitization, and licensing collections by individual libraries and interest groups. This transformation required CRL to adopt new funding models from partnerships with key organizations, and use of current technology to support community outreach and engagement. Funding was provided by the Andrew W. Mellon Foundation, the National Science Foundation, and the Institute of Museum and Library Services.

== History ==
When the Center for Research Libraries was founded in 1949, it was a product of the post-World War II era, and focused specifically on print materials. A committee consisting of Errett Weir McDiarmid (Minnesota) as chairman, Ralph E. Ellsworth (then at Iowa), and Herman H. Fussler (Chicago) recommended that a center be established. It was established by ten midwestern universities, and was established to support humanities studies and social science research efforts. CRL was originally built to manage a collective collection that no one university could maintain, and contents included foreign newspapers, government documents, microform archives, historic journals, foreign dissertations, and other material identified as critical to research. From 1959-1980 Gordon Roland Williams was director.

Since 2013, CRL has hosted NERL, originally known as the NorthEast Research Libraries Consortium, an academic library consortium that negotiates licenses for online products on behalf of 28 member academic research libraries and 80 affiliates.

== Digital era ==
The introduction of the internet and current technology meant that the relevancy of a physical repository became less important. Concerns shifted to the impact of globalization initiatives such as the financial industry, policy sector research, development of advanced information and text processing software applications to serve the for-profit research industry. This new strategy had CRL break down their areas of resources into three main areas of service:

1. Expanding electronic access to critical primary source materials, particularly news, archives, historic journals, and government information, for the CRL community through systematic digitization of CRL and member library collections and digitization of source materials to support specific scholarly projects.
2. Supporting informed investment in digital resources and preservation by making available to CRL libraries actionable information on digital repositories, collections, and services.
3. Ensuring continuous, long-term access to "last-copy" paper and microform collections for the CRL community through coordinated archiving and collection-sharing arrangements with key partners.

In 2008, the Center for Research Libraries was awarded a $1.45 million grant from the Andrew W. Mellon Foundation to support this initiative.

== Global Resources Forum ==
The economic downturn of 2007–2008 resulted in reduced library budgets, and with respect to out of control publisher pricing, many universities cut their budgets for maintaining print journal subscriptions. CRL came together to attempt to support continued access to these print journal collections, and one result of this effort was the Print Archives Preservation Registry (PAPR). PAPR is part of a larger program entitled the Global Resources Forum (GRF) that supports library and consortia decision-making on collection management and investment. "One of several components of a larger CRL program of support for consortia decision-making on collection management and investment, the Global Resources Forum. The Global Resources Forum (GRF) evolved from CRL's longstanding cooperative collection-building efforts, and applies the successful template for those area studies programs to the broader sphere of humanities and social science resources.

Like the Area Microform and Global Resources projects, GRF activities leverage for the common good the formidable pool of expertise and knowledge on traditional and digital collections that exists among CRL's extensive community." Ultimately, the GRF combines open access online resources such as data and analysis with limited-participation in both virtual and in-person roundtable discussions. These discussions include publication of audits of repositories like Portico, and examination of databases of primary source collections in areas of interest, which in turn provide critical information by which CRL libraries can base their acquisition policy and collection decisions. "In some instances the databases evaluated are digital versions of collections that CRL holds in microform or in print, and thus offer the prospect of replacing microfilm or hard copy delivery with electronic access."

== Administration and membership ==
CRL is governed by a Board of Directors made up of library directors from member institutions. The member libraries contribute a percentage of their own collection-development budget to CRL as an annual membership fee. Many libraries are CRL members as a result of their belonging to consortia which are themselves members. There are 250 libraries who are members of the CRL.

=== Member list ===
- Adler University
- Amherst College
- Arizona State University
- Association of Research Libraries
- Ball State University
- Bard College
- Baruch College
- Bates College
- Baylor University
- Berlin State Library
- Boston College
- Bowie State University
- Brandeis University
- Brock University
- Butler University
- Carleton College
- Carleton University
- Carnegie Mellon University
- Carthage College
- Chicago State University
- Colgate University
- College of William & Mary
- College of Wooster
- Colorado College
- Columbia University
- Concordia University
- Coppin State University
- Cornell University
- CUNY Graduate Center
- Dartmouth College
- Davidson College
- DePaul University
- Duke University
- Emory University
- Florida International University
- Florida State University
- Frostburg State University
- Furman University
- George Mason University
- Göttingen State and University Library
- Grinnell College
- Hamilton College
- Hampshire College
- Harvard University
- Hope College
- Illinois Institute of Technology
- Illinois Wesleyan University
- Indiana University
- Iowa State University
- Kalamazoo College
- Kansas State University
- Kent State University
- Kenyon College
- Knox College
- Kwantlen Polytechnic University
- Lafayette College
- Lake Forest College
- Lakehead University
- Lehigh University
- Liberty University
- Loyola University of Chicago
- Loyola-Notre Dame Library
- Macalester College
- Max Planck Institute for Human Development
- McGill University
- McMaster University
- Miami University of Ohio
- Michigan State University
- Morgan State University
- Mount Allison University
- Mount Holyoke College
- National Agricultural Library
- National Humanities Center
- New College of Florida
- New York Public Library
- New York University
- Northeastern University
- Northern Illinois University
- Northwestern University
- Norwich University
- North Carolina State University
- Oberlin College
- Occidental College
- Ohio State University
- Ohio University
- Oregon State University
- Olivet Nazarene University
- Online Computer Library Center
- Paul H. Nitze School of Advanced International Studies at Johns Hopkins University
- Pennsylvania State University
- Pepperdine University
- Princeton University
- Purdue University
- Queens University
- Rollins College
- Rutgers, The State University of New Jersey
- Saint Mary's College of Maryland
- Saint Olaf College
- Salisbury University
- San Diego State University
- Simon Fraser University
- Smith College
- Southern Illinois University Carbondale
- State University of New York at Geneseo
- Stanford University
- Stony Brook University
- Temple University
- Texas A & M University
- Texas Tech University
- The Claremont Colleges
- The Newberry Library
- The School of the Art Institute of Chicago
- Thomas Jefferson Foundation
- Toronto Metropolitan University
- Towson University
- Trent University
- Trinity College
- Tulane University
- Université Laval
- University of Alabama
- University of Alberta
- University of Arizona
- University of Arkansas
- University of Baltimore
- University of Baltimore Law School
- University of British Columbia
- University of Calgary
- University of California, Berkeley
- University of California, Davis
- University of California, Irvine
- University of California, Los Angeles
- University of California, Merced
- University of California, Riverside
- University of California, San Diego
- University of California, Santa Barbara
- University of California, Santa Cruz
- University of Central Florida
- University of Chicago
- University of Cincinnati
- University of Colorado
- University of Connecticut
- University of Dayton
- University of Delaware
- University of Denver
- University of Florida
- University of Georgia
- University of Illinois at Chicago
- University of Illinois at Urbana-Champaign
- University of Iowa
- University of Kansas
- University of Kentucky
- University of Manitoba
- University of Maryland, College Park
- University of Maryland Baltimore County
- University of Maryland, Baltimore
- University of Maryland, Baltimore Law Library
- University of Maryland Center for Environmental Science
- University of Maryland Eastern Shore
- University of Maryland Global Campus
- University of Massachusetts Boston
- University of Massachusetts Amherst
- University of Miami
- University of Michigan
- University of Minnesota - Twin Cities
- University of Missouri
- University of New Mexico
- University of Nebraska–Lincoln
- University of North Carolina at Chapel Hill
- University of North Florida
- University of North Texas
- University of Notre Dame
- University of Oklahoma
- University of Oregon
- University of Ottawa
- University of Pennsylvania
- University of Pittsburgh
- University of Rochester
- University of South Carolina
- University of Southern California
- University of South Florida
- University of San Diego
- University of San Francisco
- University of Saskatchewan
- University of Tennessee
- University of Texas at Austin
- University of Texas at Dallas
- University of Texas at San Antonio
- University of the South
- University of Vermont
- University of Victoria
- University of Virginia
- University of Toronto
- University of Utah
- University of Washington
- University of Western Ontario
- University of West Florida
- University of Wisconsin-Madison
- Union College
- United States Military Academy
- Valparaiso University
- Vanderbilt University
- Vassar College
- Virginia Commonwealth University
- Virginia Tech
- Washington University in St. Louis
- Wesleyan University
- West Chester University
- West Virginia University
- Wilfrid Laurier University
- Williams College
- Wofford College
- Yale University
- York University

== Projects ==
The Center oversees the International Coalition on Newspapers (est. 1999), an effort to "promote the accessibility and preservation of international newspaper collections".

== Collections ==
CRL houses large collective collections of newspapers, international doctoral dissertations, government documents and publications, international serials, and Russian monographs.

== Access ==
CRL's holdings are in OCLC's WorldCat. Items are loaned to members at no charge, while non-members are charged for access to the collections.
