= National Union Catalog =

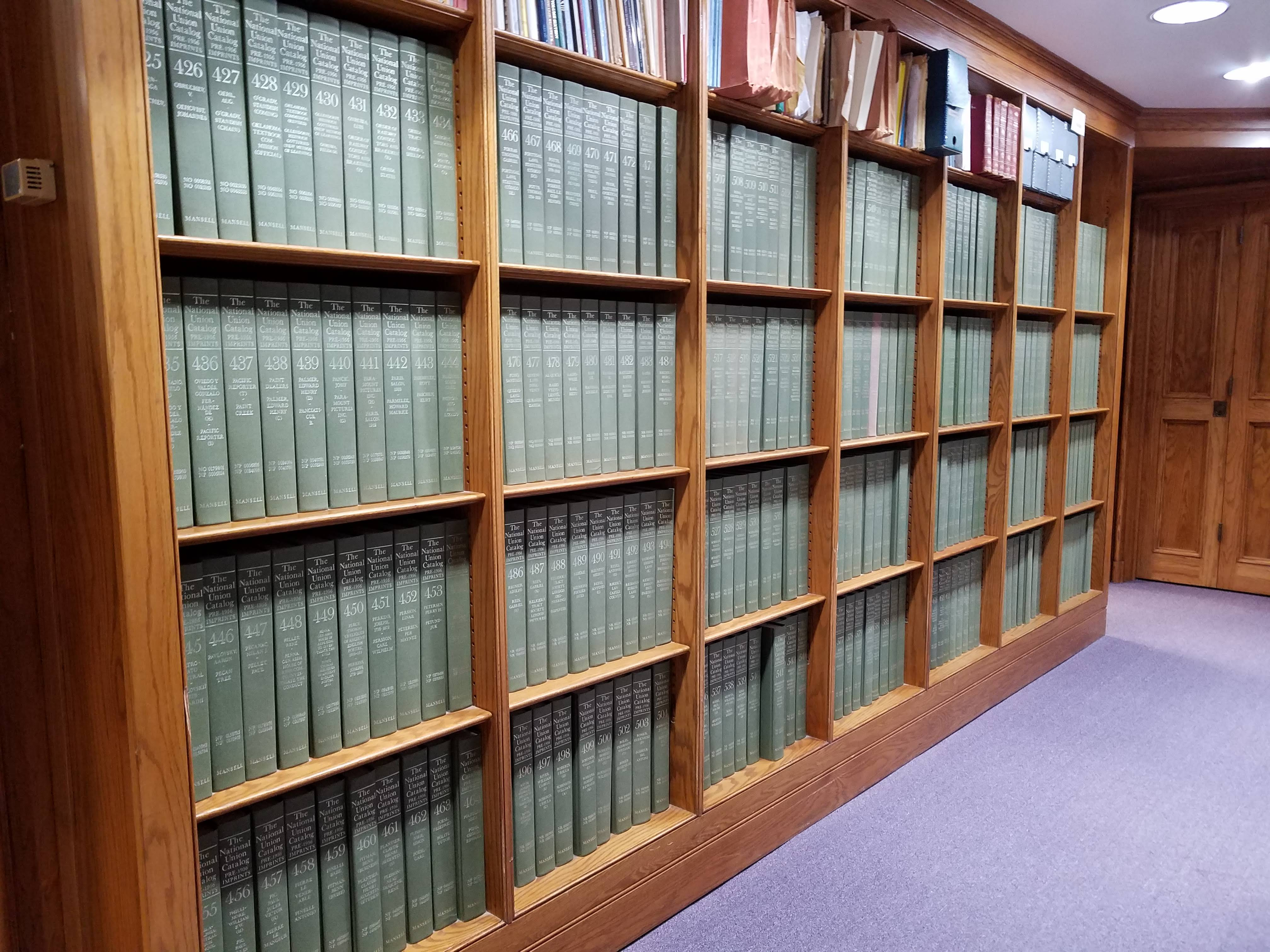
Portion of the National Union Catalog (NUC) at the Folger Shakespeare Library in Washington D.C.

Since 1983, the NUC has been only published on COM microfiches like this.

The National Union Catalog (NUC) is a printed catalog of books catalogued by the Library of Congress and other American and Canadian libraries, issued beginning in the 1950s. The National Union Catalog is divided into two series: the Pre-1956 Imprints is a 754-volume set containing all older records in a consolidated alphabetical format, while post-1955 volumes continue to be published serially. Since 1983, the NUC has been issued on microfiche only. It is not related to the National Union Catalog of Manuscript Collections (NUCMC).

== Pre-1956 Imprints ==
The National Union Catalog of Pre-1956 Imprints, a set of 754 volumes, largely superseded the older Library of Congress Catalog of printed books, and included printed works published before 1956 which are held by major American and Canadian libraries. It is sometimes referred to as the Mansell, after its publisher. This set is a massive bibliography compiled during the period from 1968 to 1981. It contains photocopies of printed catalog cards from major American and Canadian libraries, arranged alphabetically by author's last name, or by title for books that have no author, such as the Bible.

The NUC of Pre-1956 Imprints was an important resource for verifying bibliographic information and finding copies of books before the advent of large electronic bibliographic databases, such as WorldCat; the massive size and weight of the set make it less useful now. However, approximately 27% of the books listed in the NUC Pre-1956 Imprints were not in listed WorldCat as of 2005 (25% in 2008).

The complete title of this work describes its purpose and scope:

The National Union Catalog Pre-1956 Imprints: A Cumulative Author List Representing Library of Congress Printed Cards and Titles Reported by Other American Libraries, Compiled and Edited with the Cooperation of the Library of Congress and the National Union Subcommittee of the Resources Committee of the Resources and Technical Services Division, American Library Association.

The NUC of Pre-1956 Imprints is published in 754 volumes, containing over 528,000 pages. The set takes up approximately 130 feet (40 m) of shelf space. It weighs three tons.

=== Project history ===
The Library of Congress began its union catalog project in 1901 in an attempt to locate and note the location of a copy of every important book in the United States. With financial assistance from John D. Rockefeller Jr., the collection grew to over 11 million cards. Copies of these cards were distributed to a number of libraries around the country. Eventually the cards for all materials catalogued by the cooperating libraries were reproduced and issued serially in printed volumes as the National Union Catalog, supplementing the Library of Congress Catalog of Printed Books. Monthly NUC catalogs were cumulated quarterly, annually, and multi-annually.

In an effort to simplify research, it was decided in the 1960s to collect and publish all of the references to pre-1956 imprints in a single alphabetical listing. Mansell Information/Publishing Ltd., the company which created the British Museum library catalog, won the contract to publish the proposed union catalog. Over the next 14 years, about five 600-page volumes were published each month until the NUC of Pre-1956 Imprints was completed, largely superseding the older Library of Congress Catalog of Printed Books.

National Union Catalog, Pre-1956 imprints-Celebration-L-R- John Commander, Mansell Information Publishing; Gordon Roland Williams, Chair, American Library Association, Committee on the National Union Catalog; L. Quincy Mumford, Librarian of Congress, 1954-1974; Johannes L. Dewton, editor of National Union Catalog, Pre-1956 Imprints at symposium held January 27-28, 1981, at the Library of Congress, sponsored by the Center for the Book.

In 1981 In Celebration: The National Union Catalog, Pre-1956 Imprints, edited by John Y. Cole (then Executive Director of the Center for the Book), was published by the Library of Congress. It gathered papers from a symposium held January 27–28, 1981 to mark the completion of National Union Catalog.

As librarians moved to online catalogs, many libraries disposed of the National Union Catalog or moved the volumes into off-site storage. The work however remains of value. Abbott and Scherlent note, "The story of the NUC is a fascinating part of twentieth-century library history, central to the story of libraries’ transition from the analog to digital. It represented a monolithic achievement in the ongoing quest by libraries to streamline access to the world’s literature."

Some editions and registers are available online on HathiTrust, but the series index and microfiche publications of NUC from 1983 onwards have not been seen digitized.

== See also ==
- National Union Catalog of Manuscript Collections
