= Susan Grey Akers =

American librarian (1889–1984)

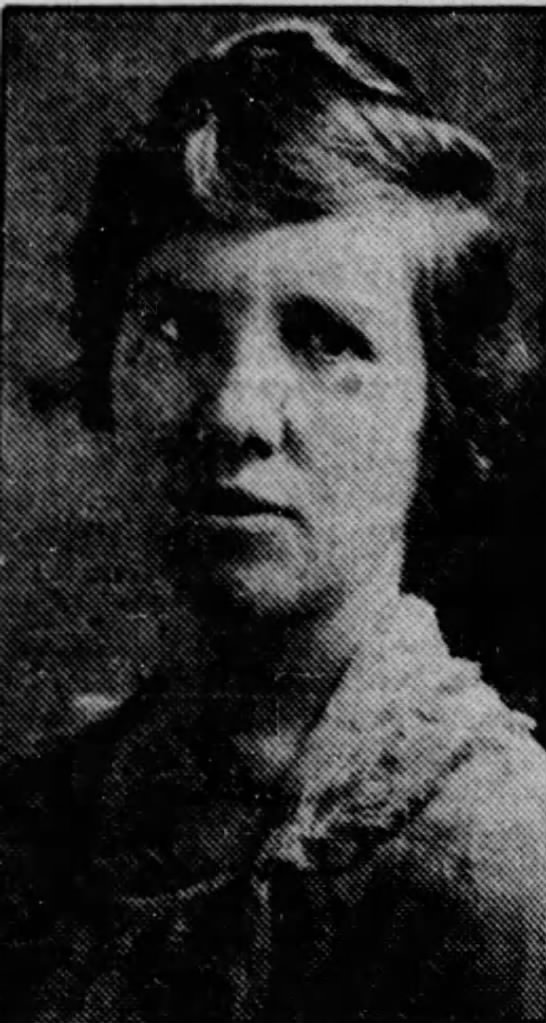
- Born: April 3, 1889; Richmond, Kentucky
- Died: January 30, 1984 (aged 94); Chapel Hill, North Carolina
- Occupation: Librarian

Susan Grey Akers (April 3, 1889 – January 30, 1984) was an American librarian and the first woman to hold an academic deanship at the University of North Carolina.

== Biography ==
Akers was born on April 3, 1889, in Richmond, Kentucky, to Clara Elizabeth Harris and James Tazewell Akers, a language professor at the University of Kentucky. She received a bachelor's degree with a major of Latin and minor in Greek from the University of Kentucky in 1909, following which she taught Latin one year in a high school in Kentucky and fifth and sixth grades one year in Birmingham, Alabama. In 1911, she began work at a public library in Louisville, Kentucky, going on to Library School at the University of Wisconsin in 1913, where she befriended director Mary Imogene Hazeltine.

After earning her certificate she became the librarian and assistant curator at Wellesley College in the Department of Hygiene and Physical Education where she restructured and updated the collection and catalog system. In the summers, she worked at the New York Public Library cataloging the reference section. In 1927, she wrote Simple Library Cataloging which went through seven editions, with each edition reflecting updates in teaching methods, in her lifetime.

She enrolled at the University of Chicago Graduate Library School in 1927 where she studied under Harriet E. Howe and Douglas Waples. Her dissertation reflected her interest in cataloging and her concern that many librarians thought it dull, becoming the first to advocate for unnecessary bibliographical detail, except where warranted. She graduated with the Ph.D. in 1932.

In 1931, Akers was hired by the University of North Carolina as an associate professor for the newly founded department of Library Science. As an associate professor, she secured $100,000 from the Carnegie Foundation in order to continue the program and a raise, becoming a full professor 1932. In 1941, she became dean and the first woman at the university to hold a dean position. At the same time, she founded and lead as dean a library program at North Carolina College for African Americans in 1941.

In 1950 and 1951, she was a library science consultant to the Department of the U.S. Army in Tokyo, Japan where she helped worked to increase teacher training. She left UNC in 1954, becoming a guest lecturer at the University of Tehran. In 1956, the American Library Association honored her with the Margaret Mann Citation in Cataloging and Classification award.

Akers died on January 30, 1984, in Chapel Hill, North Carolina.

== Papers ==
The Susan Grey Akers Papers, 1899–1984, collection is housed in the Louis Round Wilson Special Collections Library at the University of North Carolina. Its approximately 1,200 items are part of the Southern Historical Collection.

== Publications ==
- Simple Library Cataloging, 1927
- Akers, Susan Grey (1935). "The Relation of the Professional and Clerical Division of Cataloging Activities to Cataloging Courses". The Library Quarterly. 5 (1): 101–136. doi:10.1086/613617.
- Akers, S. G. (1956). A Glimpse of Library Conditions in Iran in 1954/55. North Carolina Libraries.
