= University of Chicago Graduate Library School =

Defunct librarianship school (1928–1989) at the University of Chicago

Coordinates: 41°47′32″N 87°35′59″W

- Type: Private
- Active: 1928–1989
- Parent institution: University of Chicago
- Location: Chicago, Illinois, United States
- Campus: Urban

The University of Chicago Graduate Library School (GLS) was the graduate-level librarianship school from 1928 to 1989 at the University of Chicago. It was established in 1928 to develop a program for the graduate education of librarians with a focus on research. Housed for a time in the Joseph Regenstein Library, the GLS closed in 1989 when the University of Chicago decided to promote information studies instead of professional education. GLS faculty were among the most prominent researchers in librarianship in the twentieth century.

Despite the 1989 closure of the graduate library school, the University of Chicago has been publishing The Library Quarterly since 1931.

== History ==
Early in the 20th century, the Carnegie Corporation of New York began offering grants to change the direction of library education and scholarship. The result was the 1926 endowment of a research-oriented program at the University of Chicago offering only the PhD degree. With an emphasis on investigation fostered among students, studies conducted and conferences held at GLS provided a center for intellectual inquiry in the development of 20th century librarianship.

The Library Quarterly, a scholarly journal focused on research, was launched in 1931 to provide an outlet for the publication of rigorous research.

On the 25th anniversary of the establishment of the Graduate Library School in 1951, Louis Round Wilson assessed its impact, noting that it broadened the concept of librarianship, developed it as a field for scientific study, introduced critical objectivity, contributed to the philosophy of librarianship by scholarly publishing, and furnished leaders to the field. Writing of the impact of the Graduate Library School in 2020, Nathan Johnson observed that its faculty were more closely aligned with the social sciences, and that they "turned a research gaze on the spaces codified and distributed during the earlier eras of American librarianship."

== Structure and focus ==
The Graduate Library School at the University of Chicago changed the structure and focus of education for librarianship in the twentieth century. Funded by the Carnegie Corporation, the GLS set forth policies to establish an institution to educate students imbued with the spirit of investigation. Prior to establishment of the GLS education for librarians had been an apprenticeship model. Douglas Waples wrote of the policies that would differentiate the Graduate Library School at Chicago from schools in the apprenticeship mode.

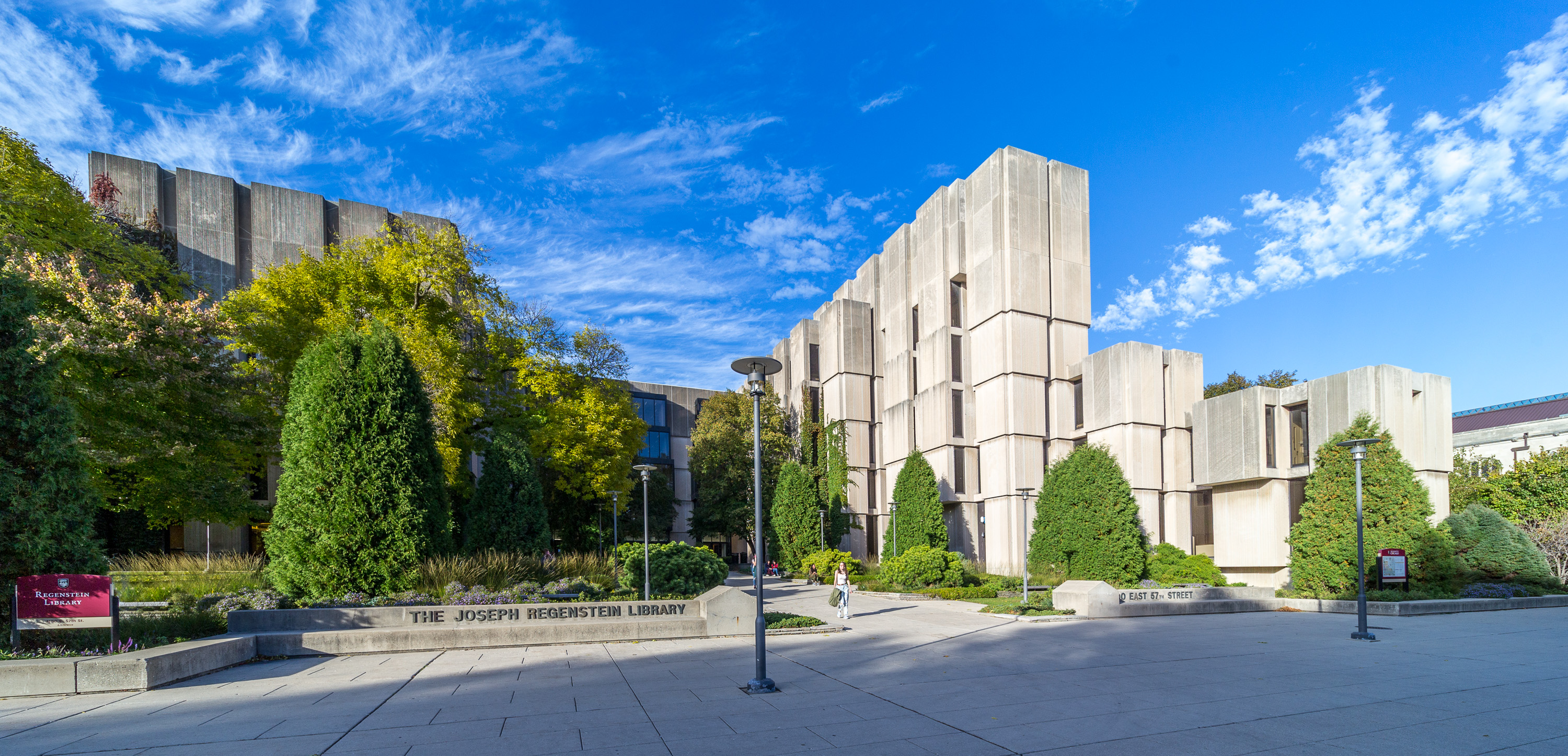
Joseph Regenstein Library, where GLS was located until it closed

John V. Richardson Jr. has written of the establishment and the first 30 years of the GLS in The Spirit of Inquiry: The Graduate Library School at Chicago, 1921–51.

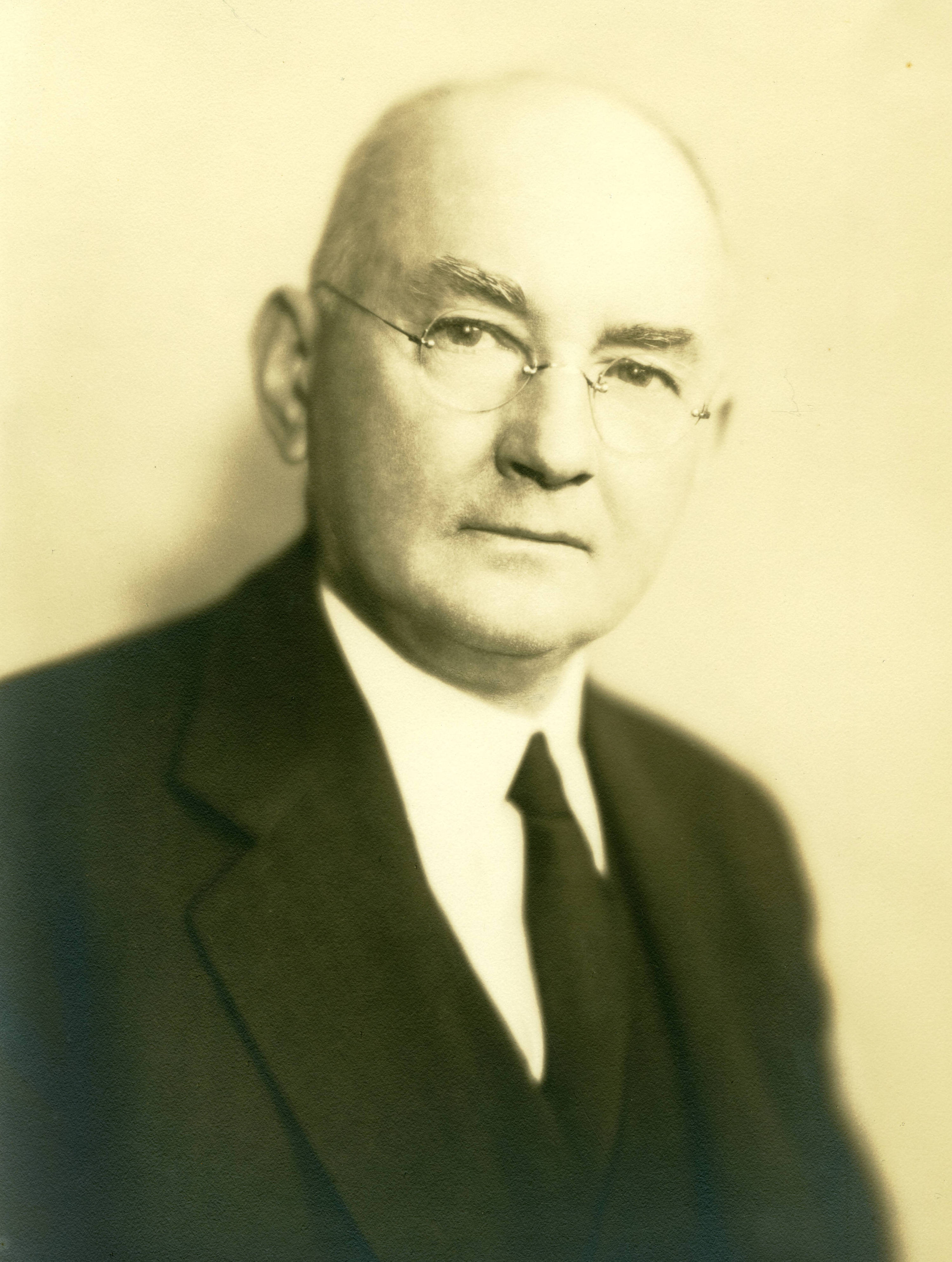
Louis Round Wilson

Joyce M. Latham has written of the role of GLS faculty in the development of the Chicago Public Library (CPL) noting "In their final report on the status of CPL, A Metropolitan Library in Action, Carleton B. Joeckel and Leon Carnovsky devoted significant attention to the role of the public library in adult education."

A list of the dissertations, theses, and papers demonstrates the range of early inquiry.

The faculty of the GLS had a profound effect on the development of public library structure and governance following World War II. Joeckel developed the National Plan for Public Library Service in 1948. GLS faculty were also innovators in the use of computers for library functions. In 1982, Don Swanson described the Microsystem for Interactive Bibliographic Searching (MIRABILIS) for the general library community in Library Journal.

== Publications ==
=== The Library Quarterly ===
The faculty of the Graduate Library School established the journal The Library Quarterly in 1931. The work of the GLS faculty to establish a scholarly journal focused on research has been carefully detailed by Steve Norman.

=== The Bulletin of the Center for Children's Books ===
The Bulletin of the Center for Children's Books was established in 1945 at the Graduate Library School by Frances E. Henne.

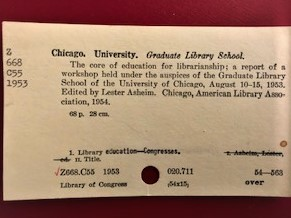
Core of Education for Librarianship-University of Chicago, Graduate Library School, 1954

== Notable faculty ==
- Lester Asheim
- Lee Pierce Butler
- Leon Carnovsky
- Margaret Elizabeth Egan
- Herman H. Fussler
- J. C. M. Hanson
- Frances E. Henne
- Carleton B. Joeckel
- W. Boyd Rayward
- Jesse Shera
- Peggy Sullivan
- Zena Sutherland
- Don R. Swanson
- Tsuen-hsuin Tsien
- Douglas Waples
- Louis Round Wilson
- Howard W. Winger
- Victor Yngve

== Notable alumni ==
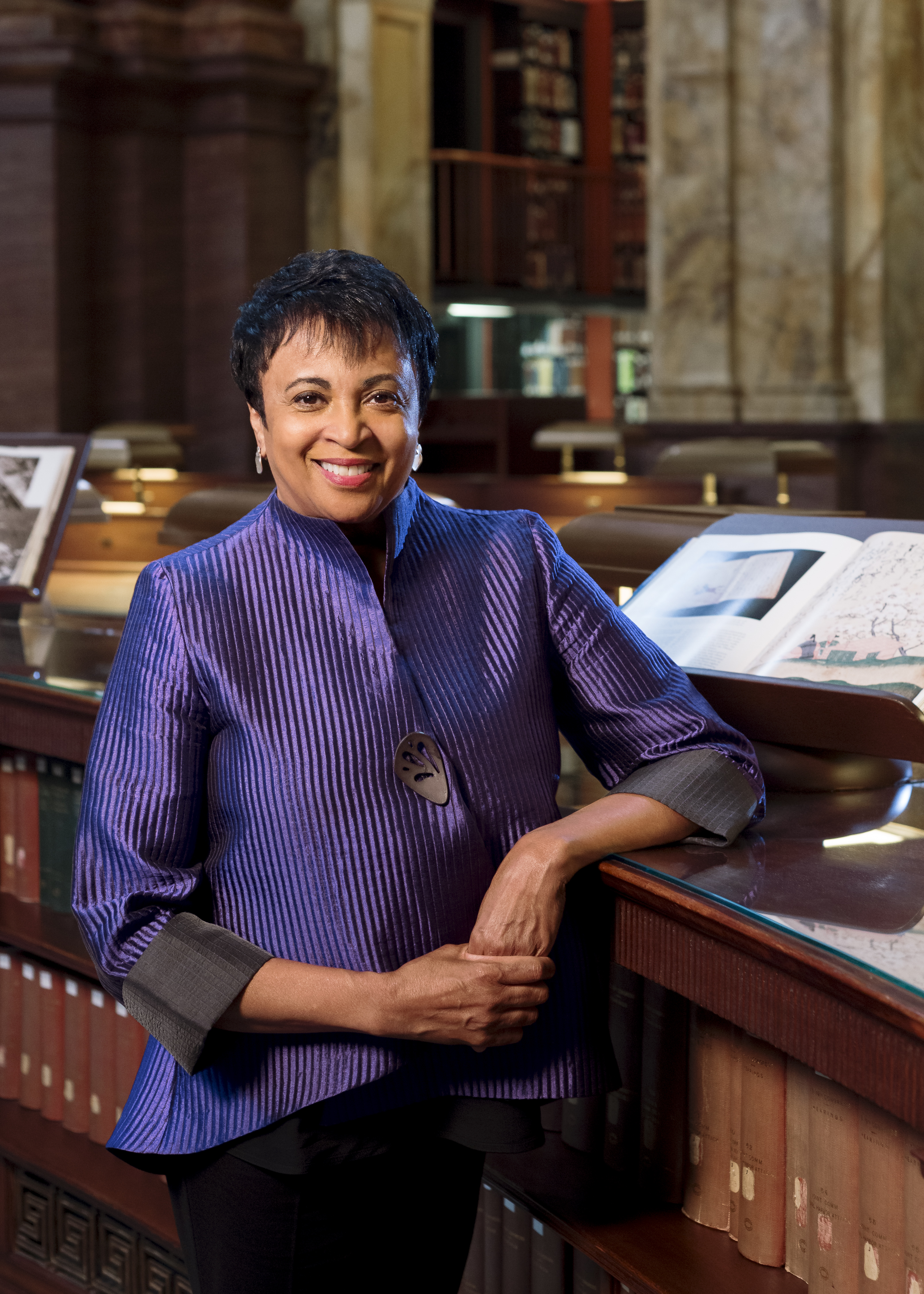
Former Librarian of Congress Carla Hayden, 2020 official portrait

- Susan Grey Akers
- Hugh Atkinson
- Bernard Berelson
- Alice I. Bryan
- John M. Cory
- El Sayed Mahmoud El Sheniti
- Ralph E. Ellsworth
- Eliza Atkins Gleason
- Herbert Goldhor
- Carla Hayden (PhD, 1987), former Librarian of Congress
- Frances E. Henne
- Virginia Lacy Jones
- Bill Katz
- Judith Krug
- Miriam Matthews
- Stephen A. McCarthy
- Kathleen de la Peña McCook
- Errett Weir McDiarmid
- Archie L. McNeal
- LeRoy C. Merritt
- Elizabeth Homer Morton
- Robert Keating O'Neill
- Benjamin E. Powell
- W. Boyd Rayward
- Charlemae Hill Rollins
- Katherine Schipper
- Ralph R. Shaw
- Spencer Shaw
- Frances Lander Spain
- Peggy Sullivan
- Maurice Tauber
- Tsuen-hsuin Tsien
- Gordon Roland Williams
