= Demco =

American supply company

DEMCO
- Company type: Private
- Industry: Furniture manufacturing; Library supplies
- Founded: 1905 in Madison, Wisconsin
- Headquarters: Madison, Wisconsin, U.S.
- Parent: Wall Family Enterprise
- Website: demco.com

DEMCO, Inc. is a Madison, Wisconsin-based supplier of equipment, furniture and supplies to libraries and schools.

== History ==
DEMCO was created in 1905 by Madison's Democrat Printing Co. as its Library Supplies Department, with a focus on printing forms for the University of Wisconsin-Madison Library.

Norman D. "Smiley" Bassett bought the company in 1931 and renamed it DEMCO Library Supplies, Inc. "A hallmark of Bassett’s leadership of one of the nation’s premier library supply companies was his close relationship with the library community and his commitment to helping libraries carry out their mission more effectively."

With Bassett remaining the owner, John E. Wall was named DEMCO's president in 1968, and under his management, the company expanded as an industry leader. Bassett retired from DEMCO in 1972, selling the company to George Banta Company of Menasha, Wisconsin, with himself as the director of Banta at that time. DEMCO remained a wholly owned subsidiary of Banta Company, Inc. until 1978 when DEMCO's management, including president and CEO Wall, acquired the company's stock in a leveraged buyout. Wall assumed full ownership of the company in 1988, remaining the controlling owner until 2006, and becoming Chairman Emeritus and passing the business on to his children in 2017.

DEMCO has continued acquisitions and mergers. In 2003, DEMCO acquired one of its long-time rivals, Gaylord’s supplies and furniture operation as well as the Gaylord brand name. In 2010, it acquired Highsmith, another library vendor rival, from W. W. Grainger, Inc. Looking to provide services beyond library supplies and furniture, DEMCO acquired Evanced Solutions, a library software company in 2011. In 2015, DEMCO acquired Boopsie, a company specializing in developing mobile-friendly apps and content platforms for libraries. And in 2017, the firm consolidated Evanced Solutions and Boopsie, through the formation of DEMCO Software as a new technology-focused corporate division.
