= Lloyd Rigler =

American businessman and philanthropist

Lloyd E. Rigler
- Born: Lloyd Eugene Rigler; May 3, 1915; Lehr, North Dakota, US
- Died: December 7, 2003 (aged 88); Los Angeles, California, US
- Education: University of Illinois
- Occupations: Businessman; Philanthropist

Lloyd Eugene Rigler (May 3, 1915 – December 7, 2003) was an American businessman and philanthropist. Rigler and his partner Lawrence E. Deutsch made Adolph's Meat Tenderizer a national brand. His most notable philanthropic effort was the 1994 establishment of the Classic Arts Showcase, a free, non-commercial television channel promoting the performing arts, film, and fine art.

== Early life and education ==
Rigler was born in Lehr, North Dakota, to Frank and Jeannette Rigler, who ran a general store serving the farming community in the town of Wishek, North Dakota, where the family lived. Rigler had five siblings.

As a young man, Rigler moved to Chicago, where he lived with relatives and worked to save money to attend the University of Illinois, from which he graduated in 1939.

== Career ==
After graduating from college, Rigler moved to New York City to go into theater. To support himself, he worked as an interviewer for a marketing research agency and did the initial research for the Waring Blender. He later headed guest relations at RCA's exhibit introducing television at the New York World's Fair in 1940. After the fair, he trained as an RCA Victor Red Seal record promotion specialist. Rigler moved to Los Angeles a year later, and became a Los Angeles salesman for Decca Records.

In 1942, during World War II, Rigler enlisted in the US Navy, but due to poor vision in his left eye, spent the war in San Pedro, California.

Lawrence E. Deutsch and Rigler met when Rigler was working in the food business: he leased space from Deutsch. They two men went into business together in the mid-1940s.

In 1948, Rigler and Deutsch, who died 1977, bought the Adolph's recipe and name from Adolph Rempp, a chef and restaurant owner in Santa Barbara, California. They later sold the Adolph's brand to Unilever.

After the sale of their company, Deutsch and Rigler formed the Ledler Corporation, a venture capital firm.

=== Philanthropy ===
After Deutsch died, in 1977, Rigler formed a philanthropic foundation called the Lloyd E. Rigler–Lawrence E. Deutsch Foundation.

In May 1994, Rigler founded Classic Arts Showcase, which allows people who haven't the financial resources to experience art and culture in person. The television channel provides a 24/7 experience for free. Prior to his death, Rigler funded the program to operate through at least 2022; the channel stated in 2020 that the foundation had enough money to run through at least 2040 with no outside funding sources. The signal of Classic Arts Showcase is not scrambled, so there is no authentication / access restriction, and there are no commercials.

In 1999, Rigler founded the American Association of Single People, which focuseds on political rights for single people.

Rigler's other philanthropic efforts included:

- 1980s: Joffrey Ballet – when it was located at the Los Angeles Music Center
- 1990s: Egyptian Theatre – restoration
- American Cinematheque, Hollywood theaters
- Los Angeles Music Center – Founding Donor
- New York City Opera: Vice-Chairman of the Board of Directors
- Carnegie Hall - refurbishing
- Los Angeles County Museum of Arts- donations

== Death ==
Rigler died of cancer on December 7, 2003, at age 88, at his home in Los Angeles.

== See also ==
- Rigler-Deutsch Index
