= National Union Catalog of Manuscript Collections =

NUCMC is the abbreviation for the National Union Catalog of Manuscript Collections. It is a national-level program based at the Library of Congress that seeks to promote free access to the documentary heritage of the United States. It does this by providing cataloging for archives and historical societies around the country that do not have access to national online databases. The program started in 1959 and published bound volumes of cataloging records from 1962 to 1993. One famed editor was Arline Custer, Head of the Manuscript Section, Descriptive Cataloging Division of the Library of Congress. As of 1986, the cataloging records were input into RLIN, the Research Libraries Information Network, an international online database. As of September 2007, all cataloging records in RLIN have been migrated into the OCLC database (WorldCat), since RLIN was merged into OCLC. All cataloging since that time has been input into OCLC. It is not related to the NUC Pre-1956 volumes.
