= Library and information scientist =

A library and information scientist, also known as a library scholar, is a researcher or academic who specializes in the field of library and information science and often participates in scholarly writing about and related to library and information science. A library and information scientist is neither limited to any one subfield of library and information science nor any one particular type of library. These scientists come from all information-related sectors including library and book history.

== University of Chicago Graduate Library School ==
The University of Chicago Graduate Library School was established in 1928 to grant a graduate degree in librarianship with an emphasis on research. The program expanded the concept of librarianship, focused on scientific inquiry and established it as a domain for scientific study.

In The Spirit of Inquiry: The Graduate Library School at Chicago, 1921-51 Richardson reviewed the history of the School and its impact on the discipline.

== Bibliometric mappings ==
Bibliometric methods have been used to create maps of library and information science, thus identifying the most important researchers as well as their relative connections (or distances) and identifying emerging trends related to LIS publications within the field.

White and McCain (1998) made a map of information science and Åström (2002), Chen, Ibekwe-SanJuan, and Hou (2010), Janssens, Leta, Glanzel, and De Moor (2006), and Zhao and Strotmann (2008) constructed some later maps of library and information science.

Jabeen, Yun, Rafiq, and Jabeen (2015) mapped the growth and trends of LIS publications.

== Notable library and information scientists ==
See also Beta Phi Mu Award, Award of Merit - Association for Information Science and Technology, Justin Winsor Prize (library)

- Lester Asheim
- Marcia J. Bates
- Sanford Berman
- John Shaw Billings
- Samuel C. Bradford
- Joseph Penn Breedlove
- Suzanne Briet
- James Duff Brown
- Michael Buckland
- Leon Carnovsky
- Lois Mai Chan
- Ching-chih Chen
- Cyril W. Cleverdon
- Michèle Cloonan
- Pauline Atherton Cochrane
- Blaise Cronin
- Carlos Cuadra
- Ingetraut Dahlberg
- Robert Darnton
- Melvil Dewey
- El Sayed Mahmoud El Sheniti
- Douglas John Foskett
- Herman H. Fussler
- Eugene Garfield
- Rudolph Hjalmar Gjelsness
- Michael Gorman
- Robert M. Hayes
- Edward G. Holley
- Carleton Joeckel
- Karen Spärck Jones
- Allen Kent
- Frederick Kilgour
- David A. Kronick
- Frederick Wilfrid Lancaster
- Peter Johan Lor
- Hans Peter Luhn
- Clifford Lynch

- Mary Niles Maack
- Gary Marchionini
- Kathleen de la Peña McCook
- Alexander Ivanovich Mikhailov
- Calvin Mooers
- Herbert Marvin Ohlman
- Hope A. Olson
- Paul Otlet
- Richard Ovenden
- Pettegree, Andrew
- S. R. Ranganathan
- W. Boyd Rayward
- John V. Richardson Jr.
- Phyllis Richmond
- Gerald Salton
- Tefko Saracevic
- Claire Kelly Schultz
- Michael Seadle
- Ralph R. Shaw
- Jesse Shera
- Dan Simonescu
- Linda C. Smith
- Peggy Sullivan
- Elaine Svenonius
- Donald R. Swanson
- Mortimer Taube
- Robert Saxton Taylor
- Barbara Tillett
- Tsuen-hsuin Tsien
- Brian Campbell Vickery
- Hans Wellisch
- Herbert S. White
- Wayne A. Wiegand
- Louis Round Wilson
- Thomas D. Wilson

== See also ==
- Bibliometrician
- Computer scientist
- Documentalist
- History of books
- History of libraries
- Information scientist
- Librarian
- Library science
- List of library and information science journals
