= Wellisch =

Wellisch is a surname. Notable people with the surname include:

- Adolpho Wellisch (1886–1972), Brazilian diver
- Christian Wellisch (born 1975), Hungarian-American professional mixed martial artist
- Hans Wellisch (1920–2004), Austrian-American indexer and LIS educator

== See also ==
- Wallisch
