= Von Richter =

von Richter is a German surname. Notable people with the surname include:

- Owen Von Richter (born 1975), Canadian swimmer
- Victor von Richter (1841–1891), German chemist
  - Von Richter reaction

== See also ==
- Richter (surname)
