= Peter Ingwersen (information scientist) =

Danish information scientist (*1947)

Dr. Peter Ingwersen D. Ph., h.c.
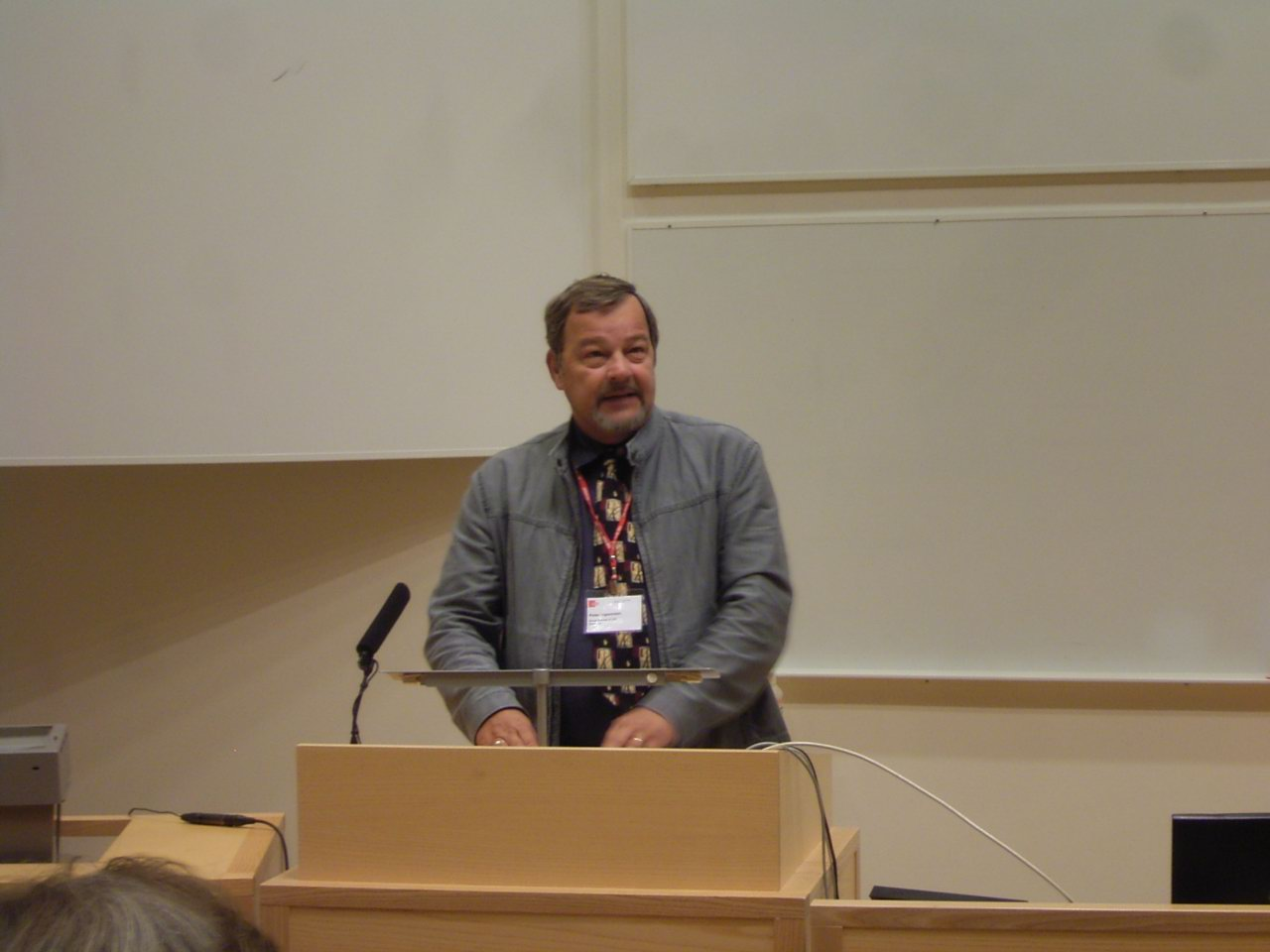
- Born: Peter Emil Rerup Ingwersen
- Education: Copenhagen Business School (1991)
- Occupations: librarian, information scientist
- Website: peteringwersen.info

Peter Emil Rerup Ingwersen, D. Ph., h.c. (1947) is a Danish information scientist and librarian. He is a professor emeritus at the Royal School of Library and Information Science at the University of Copenhagen. Ingwersen was among the two first research professors of librarianship and information science appointed in Denmark.He is known as the father of webometrics, and is also known for his Cognitive Theory of Information Retrieval. Between 1990 and 2005, he was the most-cited Danish researcher in the Social Sciences. In 2016, Ingwersen was awarded the ASIS&T Award of Merit, in recognition of his contributions to the field of information science, particularly webometrics and information retrieval. As of 2017, he is an adjunct professor at Aalborg University, in the Department of Psychology and Communication.

== Career ==
In 1973, Peter Ingwersen graduated from the Royal School of Library and Information Science (Royal School of LIS) in Copenhagen with a degree in Library and Information Studies. That same year, he became a lecturer at the Royal School, teaching information storage and retrieval, and cataloguing and indexing theory.

From 1982-1984, he worked for the European Space Agency in Frascati, Italy, as a research associate in the Information Retrieval Service. He was involved with UI improvements, online support and retrieval tool development, and systems management.

In 1984, Ingwersen returned to the Royal School of LIS as an associate professor in the Information Resources Management department, with a brief stint as a guest professor at Rutgers University in 1987. He earned his Ph. D. from the Copenhagen Business School in 1991. Since 1997, he has been an affiliate professor/docent at Åbo Akademi University in Finland. In 2001, he became a research professor at the Royal School of LIS, and in 2006 he was made a full professor in information retrieval. He retired from the Royal School in 2010.

== Webometrics ==
With his student, Tomas Almind, Ingwersen published the article "Informetric analyses on the World Wide Web: methodological approaches to webometrics" in 1997. The article coined the term and kickstarted the field of webometrics, which seeks to quantify and study internet-based phenomena. Ingwersen further defined webometrics in "Toward a basic framework for webometrics," which he co-wrote with Lennart Björneborn in 2004: "The study of the quantitative aspects of the construction and use of information resources, structures and technologies on the Web drawing on bibliometric and informetric approaches."

According to researcher Mike Thelwall, although other definitions have been proposed, Ingwersen and Björneborn's original definition is still the primary one used in the field.

As of 2010, webometrics was the largest sub-field within library and information science.

== Major publications ==
- "Search procedures in the library -- analyzed from the cognitive point of view," Journal of Documentation, 1982
- Information Retrieval Interaction (1992)
- "Cognitive perspectives of information retrieval interaction: elements of a cognitive IR theory," Journal of Documentation, 1996
- "Informetric analyses on the World Wide Web: methodological approaches to webometrics" (with Tomas Almind), Journal of Documentation, 1997
- "Perspectives of webometrics" (with Lennart Björneborn), Scientometrics, 2001
- "Toward a basic framework for webometrics" (with Lennart Björneborn), Journal of the American Society for Information Science and Technology, 2004
- The Turn: Integration of Information Seeking and Retrieval in Context (with Kalervo Järvelin, 2005)

== Awards ==
- Jason Farradane Award (1993)
- American Society for Information Science/New Jersey Chapter Distinguished Lectureship Award (1994)
- ASIS&T Research Award (USA, 2003)
- Thomson Award of Excellence (Denmark, 2005)
- Derek de Solla Price Award (2005)
- Honorary doctorate, Tampere University (2010)
- Honorary doctorate, Åbo Akademi (2014)
- UKeiG Tony Kent Strix Award (2015)
- ASIS&T Award of Merit (2016)
