= Elaine Svenonius =

American librarian (born 1933)

- Born: January 9, 1933; Philadelphia, Pennsylvania, U.S.
- Education: Barnard College; University of Pennsylvania; University of Chicago
- Occupations: librarian and library scholar
- Awards: ALCTS Margaret Mann Citation, Ranganathan Award for Classification Research

Elaine Svenonius is an American librarian and library scholar, known for her research on bibliographic control, particularly cataloging, classification, and indexing. She is best known for bringing a philosophical knowledge organization approach to cataloging theory.

== Early life and education ==
Svenonius was born in Philadelphia on January 9, 1933. Her parents were Edward Fackenthal, who was a college professor, and Ethel Fackenthal.

Svenonius did her undergraduate work at Barnard College, graduating with a B.A. in 1954. She received an MA in Philosophy from the University of Pennsylvania in 1957, an MA in Library Science in 1965 from the University of Chicago, and a PhD in Library Science in 1971, also from the University of Chicago.

== Career ==
Svenonius was Assistant dean at the School of Library and Information Science, University of Western Ontario from 1972 to 1978. She worked as an Associate professor of librarianship and information management at the University of Denver from 1979 to 1981. In 1981 she was appointed to the faculty at the UCLA Graduate School of Library & Information Science, where she taught until her retirement in 1994. Since 1994 she has held the position of Professor emeritus at UCLA.

In The Intellectual Foundation of Information Organization, Svenonius attempts to "synthesize the literature of information organization in a language and at a level of generality to make it understandable to persons outside the field of library and information science" and to "synthesize subject and descriptive cataloging within a common conceptual framework." The book is frequently assigned to Master of Library and Information Science students, among whom it is nicknamed "the red devil".

Svenonius was the recipient of the ALCTS Margaret Mann Citation and the Ranganathan Award for Classification Research.

== Personal life ==
Svenonius was married to Lars Svenonius in 1957, and divorced in 1963.

== Publications ==
- Svenonius, Elaine, ed. String Indexing. 3 vols. London, Ontario: School of Library and Information Science, University of Western Ontario, 1977.
- Svenonius, Elaine, Lois Mai Chan, and Phyllis Richmond, eds. Theory of Subject Analysis. Littleton, Colorado: Libraries Unlimited, 1985.
- Svenonius, Elaine and Michael Carpenter, eds. Foundations of Cataloging. Littleton, Colorado: Libraries Unlimited, 1985.
- Svenonius, Elaine, ed. The Conceptual Foundations of Descriptive Cataloging. San Diego: Academic Press, 1988.
- Holley, Robert P., Dorothy McGarry, Elaine Svenonius, and Donna Duncan, eds. Subject Indexing: Principles and Practices in the Nineties. Munich: K. G. Saur, 1995. Svenonius also contributed to the volume.
- Svenonius, Elaine. The Intellectual Foundation of Information Organization. Cambridge, Massachusetts: MIT Press, 2000.
- Lubetzky, Seymour. Seymour Lubetzky: Writings on the Classical Art of Cataloging. Edited and compiled by Elaine Svenonius and Dorothy McGarry. Englewood, Colorado: Libraries Unlimited, 2001.
