= Julius Lewkowitsch =

German chemist and author (1857–1913)

- Born: 4 September 1857; Ostrowo, Kingdom of Prussia
- Died: 16 September 1913 (aged 56); Chamonix, Haute-Savoie, French Third Republic
- Citizenship: Prussian; naturalised British
- Education: University of Breslau
- Known for: The Chemical Technology and Analysis of Oils, Fats, and Waxes (five editions, 1895–1921)
- Spouse: Katherine Julia Morris
- Children: Elsa Lewkowitsch, Jason Farradane
- Awards: Lavoisier Medal (1909)
- Scientific career
- Fields: Chemistry of oils and fats
- Thesis: (1879)
- Academic advisors: Victor von Richter

Julius Isidor Lewkowitsch (1857–1913) was a German chemical engineer, specialising in vegetable and animal oils and fats, who settled in Victorian England. He was the author of The Chemical Technology and Analysis of Oils, Fats, and Waxes, a standard text that went through five editions in the years 1895–1921.

== Life ==
Julius Lewkowitsch was born in Ostrowo (then in the Kingdom of Prussia) on 4 September 1857, into a Jewish family. In 1879 he obtained a doctorate from Breslau University, where he studied under Victor von Richter. After short periods as a secondary-school teacher and as a research assistant to Victor Meyer at Heidelberg University, Lewkowitsch became an industrial researcher. In 1887 he moved to England as Technical Manager to the soap manufacturers Joseph Watson & Sons in Leeds, where he developed a way of preparing glycerin from soap lye without the use of arsenic. In 1889 he became a member of the Society of Chemical Industry. In 1895 he set up in business as a consulting chemist in Manchester, moving to London in 1898. He established his own laboratory in West Hampstead.

On 5 May 1902 Lewkowitsch married Katherine Julia Morris. Their two children were Elsa Lewkowitsch and Jason Farradane. Lewkowitsch died at Chamonix on 15 September 1913.

In 1980 the Society of Chemical Industry's biennial Julius Lewkowitsch Memorial Lecture was established in his memory in accordance with a bequest by his daughter, Elsa.

== Awards ==
- Lavoisier Medal, 1909

== Publications ==
- The Chemical Technology and Analysis of Oils, Fats, and Waxes, first edition 1895.

Lewkowitsch was a contributor to the 11th edition of the Encyclopaedia Britannica (1911).
