= London Education Classification =

The London Education Classification is a library classification and indexing thesaurus used at the UCL Institute of Education. It was devised by D.J. Foskett and Joy Foskett. It was devised to address deficiencies in general classification schemes in dealing with education. It was originally devised in 1963, and revised in 1974. It is a faceted classification, inspired by the work of S.R. Ranganathan and of the Classification Research Group.

== Main facets ==
Foiskett and Foskett observe: "The basic idea of facets is separate grouping of each major division of a subject.". Using the British Education Index and the British National Bibliography, they divided educational terms into groups that are mutually exclusive. This forms the foundation of the classification sequence.

B	Education, general principles, etc.
D	School buildings and equipment
F	The teaching profession
G	School, college and university officers
H	School, college and university management
J	Educational psychology and measurement
K	Students' work
L	Teaching method
M-P	Curriculum
R-S	Educands and schools
T	Exceptional children

In the LEC main facets are indicated by a capital letter, and terms in facets by lower case letters. Letters are arranged so that vowels and consonants alternate, so that the eventual notation will appear as a syllable. e.g.

Bab	Education, general
Bin	Inspectorate
Bux	Educational documentation
Liv	Visits
Rog	Progressive schools

Thus, a work on "Wikipedia : the missing manual / John Broughton" would be shelved at shelved at

Loyx
Bux
BRO

With BRO being based on the author's name.

== Indexing Thesaurus ==
As originally implemented, the shelf arrangement produced by the classification was supplemented by an indexed card catalogue, where index entries were created for each element in the classmark, in reverse order from the classification. The example Foskett and Foskett gave was:

Direct method: French : Secondary Modern School	Rid	Men	Lim
French : Secondary Modern School	Rid	Men
Secondary Modern School	Rid

"Each entry refers the reader to the part of the classified section, Rid, where all entries on Secondary modern school are filed.". The 1974 second edition of the scheme was supplemented by thesaurus cross referencing between narrow terms, broad terms and related terms.
