= John Sherrod =

American information scientist (1924–2004)

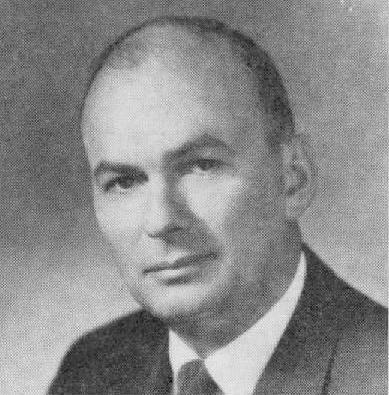
- Born: September 10, 1924; Kane
- Died: July 10, 2004 (aged 79); Pittsboro
- Resting place: Arlington National Cemetery
- Alma mater: Pennsylvania State University; Allegheny College
- Occupation: Meteorologist, librarian, information scientist
- Employer: Library of Congress (1952–1963)
- Position held: Director of the United States National Agricultural Library (1968–1973), director (1963–1968), president (1970–)

John Sherrod (September 10, 1924 – July 10, 2004) was an American meteorologist and information scientist.

== Biography ==
John Sherrod was born on September 10, 1924, in Kane, Pennsylvania.

Sherrod received a B.S. in mathematics from Allegheny College, Meadville, Pa., in 1947 and then a B.S. and M.S. in meteorology from Pennsylvania State College, where he remained as instructor and research meteorologist until 1952.

He then worked at the Library of Congress as head of the Snow, Ice, and Permafrost (SIPRE) Bibliography Project in the former Technical Information Division. He was promoted in April 1956 to acting chief of the Science Division, and was appointed chief a year later.

In March 1963 Sherrod was appointed chief of the Information Services and Systems Branch, Division of Technical Information (renamed Science and Technology in 1958) at the U. S. Atomic Energy Commission which was later merged in the US Department of Energy .As Deputy Director of Technical Information at the US Department of Energy, he was instrumental in establishing the Nuclear Energy Information System (INIS).

Sherrod was appointed Director of the National Agricultural Library (NAL) in 1968. During his tenure as there from 1968 to 1973, he led the development of the International Agricultural System (AGRIS) under the aegis of the United Nations.

Following his government career, Sherrod worked for many years as a senior consultant to Aspen Systems Corporation in Rockville, MD., He also taught graduate information science courses at Drexel and Rutgers Universities, and authored and edited publications on scientific and technical information.

Sherrod served in the US Navy during World War II, retiring as a Lt. Commander.

Sherrod was elected President of the American Society for Information Science in 1970,

Sherrod died on 10 July 2004 in Pittsboro, North Carolina; he is buried at Arlington National Cemetery.
