= Jeffrey Katzer =

American librarian

Jeffrey Katzer (1942-March 4, 2000) was an American educator who served as professor, associate dean, and dean at Syracuse University from 1968 until his passing in 2000. Katzer was instrumental in establishing the PhD program in information transfer in the 1970s. In the early 1990s, Katzer and others established the undergraduate program in information management and technology, the first such program nationwide, as well as raising Syracuse to national prominence in the field of information science & technology. An early achievement at Syracuse was the development of the Syracuse University Psychological Abstracts Retrieval Service (SUPARS), a pre-internet search engine consisting of over 35,000 individual items.

== Professional career ==
Katzer spent the majority of his professional career at Syracuse University. Throughout his 32-year tenure, he served as professor and associate dean in the school of information science, with two stints as dean. While at Syracuse, Katzer spearheaded the formation of the doctoral program for the School of Information Science, raising the program to national prominence. While at Syracuse, Katzer intermittently produced scholarly literature

Katzer also served as a consultant throughout his tenure at Syracuse, offering assistance to a myriad of organizations, including Southwestern Bell, the US Department of State, and UNESCO.

== Syracuse University Psychological Abstracts Retrieval Service (SUPARS) ==
In 1969, Katzer, working alongside his colleague Pauline Atherton, designed the Syracuse University Psychological Abstracts Retrieval Service (SUPARS). This project functioned as a proto-internet search engine, indexing 35,000 issues from the American Psychological Association’s Psychological Abstracts. SUPARS hardware consisted of a printing computer terminal connected to an IBM 360 mainframe. Users would input key terms, which would then return the quantity of relevant results. Those results could be modified and then would be printed out in the form of a list of citations. Two unique aspects (at the time) of SUPARS were the ability to search text within documents and the capacity to save previous searches.

In addition to traditional academic funding sources, the rising interest during the 1970s and 1980s in computer-centered research by the military industrial complex led to the SUPARS project receiving funding from the Rome Air Development Center, a research division of the United States Air Force.

== Legacy and honors ==
Throughout his professional career, Katzer was a member in the following organizations: the Association for Information Science and Technology, the Association for Information Systems, the Phi Beta Delta Honor Society for International Scholars, and the Association for Library and Information Science Education.American Society for Information Science.

In 1992, Katzer was the recipient of the Outstanding Information Science Teacher Award, presented by the Association for Information Science and Technology (ASIS&T).

In addition, Syracuse offers both the Jeffrey Katzer Undergraduate Professor of the Year Award and the Jeffrey Katzer Doctoral Student Advancement Fund. These honors are given annually to the professor and PhD student who best exemplify the values and ideals of Katzer.
