= Hazel Hall (information scientist) =

British information scientist and academic

Hazel Jane Read Hall FRSE FCLIP FHEA
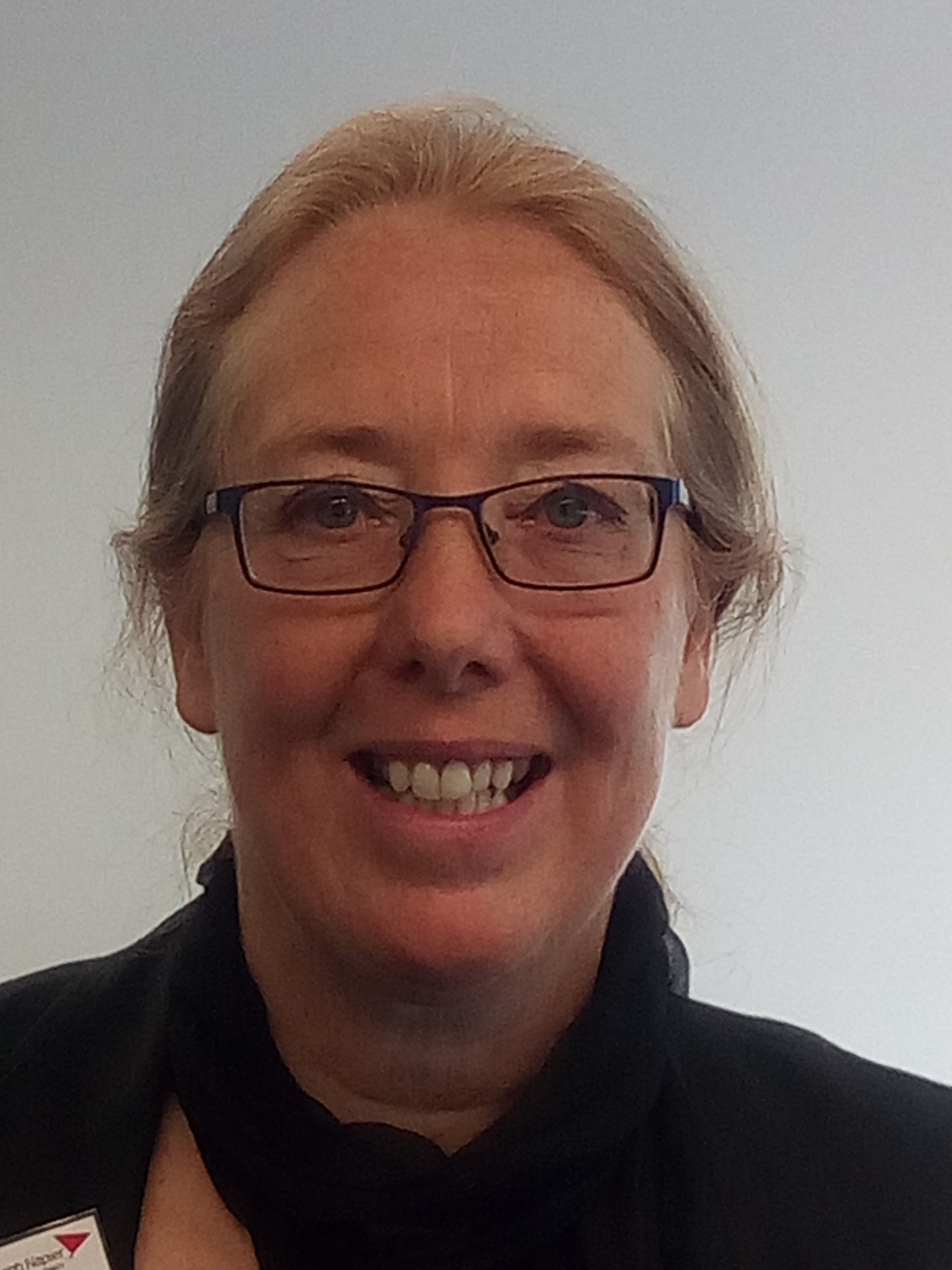
- Born: 24 March 1963 (age 63); Edinburgh, Scotland, UK
- Education: Sorbonne, the Université de Nantes and University of Birmingham
- Occupation: Information Scientist

Hazel Jane Read Hall FRSE FCLIP FHEA (born 24 March 1963) is a British Information scientist and academic. She is Emeritus Professor in the School of Computing, Engineering, and Built Environment at Edinburgh Napier University, Scotland and Docent in Information Studies in the School of Business and Economics at Åbo Akademi University, Finland.

== Early life and education ==
Hall was born in Edinburgh in 1963, the daughter of veterinary surgeon Paul Guy Hall (1938-2018) and school teacher Marianne Hall (née Toulmin (1939-2025), through whom she is related to economist Camilla Toulmin, Olympian Nick Toulmin, and philosopher Stephen Toulmin). Much of her childhood was spent in the north of England. She studied French language and literature at the Sorbonne, the Université de Nantes and the University of Birmingham, from where she graduated with a BA (Special Honours) in 1986. After working in the libraries of both the University of Birmingham and Birmingham Polytechnic during the late 1980s, she was awarded her MA in Library and Information Studies from the University of Central England in 1993.

== Teaching and research ==
In 1989, Hall took up a post as lecturer within the Department of Communication and Information Studies at Queen Margaret College, Edinburgh. During this time, as well as completing her master's degree, she also contributed to a number of journals and conferences, with subjects reflecting her interest in the increasing importance of computers and internet technologies, the gender gap within computing and the role of information science within the workplace amongst others.

Hall joined the teaching staff of the School of Computing at Napier University in 1999, becoming a Senior Lecturer in 2000. Continuing her earlier research, in 2004 she was awarded a PhD by Napier University for her thesis “The knowledge trap: an intranet implementation in a corporate environment” which had been sponsored by KPMG.

A Royal Academy of Engineering grant allowed Hall to undertake a six-month industrial placement with TFPL Limited, before being made Reader in Social Informatics in 2007, and Director of the Centre for Social Informatics in 2009.

Between 2009 and 2012, Hall led the work of the Library and Information Science Research Coalition, a UK-wide project to facilitate a co-ordinated and strategic approach to research in the field, becoming Professor of Social Informatics at the renamed Edinburgh Napier University in 2010.

A particular focus of the coalition was to develop librarians as practitioner-researchers, and Hall led the creation of a UK-wide formal UK-wide network of Library and information science (LIS) researchers called DREaM (Developing Research Excellence and Methods) receiving funding from the Arts and Humanities Research Council to launch the network during 2011 and 2012. At the same time, Hall led two pieces of work looking at how the influence on practice of funded research in the LIS field might be enhanced. The first of the RiLIES projects (Research in Librarianship - Impact Evaluation Study) formed part of Hall's keynote presentation at the 6th International Evidence Based Library and Information Practice Conference held at the University of Salford in 2011.

Hall was appointed as Docent in Information Studies within the Faculty of Social Sciences, Business and Economics, at Åbo Akademi University, Finland in 2017.

In 2014, the Chartered Institute of Library and Information Professionals (CILIP) and Archives and Records Association (ARA) commissioned Hall and a team from Edinburgh Napier University to assist the sector they represent by conducting a study into the nature of the Information workforce in the United Kingdom. On the release of the full report in 2018, CILIP/ARA described the work as "the most extensive study of its kind anywhere in the world to date."

Hall's research has been acknowledged within a review of worldwide social informatics research published in the Journal of Information Science in 2016; her main research contributions relate to information sharing in online environments. These have led to the development of knowledge and understanding across a range of themes including: power relations in knowledge management; the agency of non-human actors in technology implementations; co-operation and collaboration in online communities; knowledge creation processes and innovation; and knowledge management as management innovation.

Hall was made Emeritus Professor in 2022.

== Recognition ==
Hall has been recognised by a number of awards and fellowships including:

- Clarivate Analytics Outstanding Information Science Teacher Award 2019 from the Association for Information Science & Technology (ASIS&T)
- Elsevier/LIRG Research Award 2005
- Information Professional of the Year 2009
- Special Libraries Association Europe Information Professional Award (SLA Europe IP 2011)
- Jason Farradane Award 2016
- Fellow of the Royal Society of Edinburgh
- She served on the Research Councils UK Digital Economy Programme Advisory Board from 2014, chairing the Board from 2015 until the end of her term in 2017.
- She is a member of sub-panel 34 of the UK Research Excellence Framework 2021

== Personal life ==
Hall is married to Tim Read, a UK computer scientist.
