= Frederick Wilfrid Lancaster =

British-American information scientist (1933–2013)

F. W. Lancaster

Frederick Wilfrid ("Wilf") Lancaster (September 4, 1933 – August 25, 2013) was a British-American information scientist. He immigrated to the US in 1959 and worked as information specialist for the National Library of Medicine in Bethesda, Maryland, from 1965 to 1968. He was a professor at the University of Illinois, Urbana, from 1972 to 1992 and professor emeritus from 1992 to 2013. He continued as an honored scholar after retirement speaking on the evolution of librarianship in the 20th and 21st century.

Lancaster made notable achievements with early online retrieval systems, including evaluation studies of MEDLARS. He published broadly in library and information science over a period of four decades and continuously emerged as a visionary leader in the field, where research, writing, and teaching earned him the highest honors in the profession. Lancaster excelled at many fronts: as scholar, educator, mentor, and writer.

== Career ==
Lancaster graduated as an associate of the British Library Association from the University of Northumbria at Newcastle, England, in 1955 and was named a fellow of the Library Association of Great Britain in 1969. He began his professional career as a senior assistant at the Newcastle-upon-Tyne Public Libraries. He immigrated in 1959 to Akron, Ohio to become the senior librarian for science and technology at the Akron Public Library.

Lancaster worked as the technical librarian for Babcock & Wilcox from 1960 until he returned to the U.K. in 1962 to become a senior research assistant at ASLIB in London.

In 1964, Lancaster returned to the U.S. where he was integrally involved in the design and management of MEDLARS, the National Library of Medicine's computerized bibliographic retrieval system for articles in academic journals in medicine and allied health professions.

Lancaster was appointed associate professor and director of the biomedical librarianship program at the University of Illinois-Urbana in 1970. In 1972 he was promoted to professor at the university where he did research and taught until 1992. He became professor emeritus in 1992.

== Research and scholarship ==
Lancaster, was the most cited author, during the 1970s and early 1990s, in the discipline of information science and had broad intellectual influence. Over a period of four decades Lancaster was a visionary leader in the field of library and information science.

His evaluation of the MEDLARS Demand Search Service in 1966 and 1967 was an important landmark in the evaluation of a computer-based retrieval system. It was the first application of recall and precision measures in a large, operational database setting.

Information Retrieval Online (Lancaster & Fayen, 1973) was named ASIS Best Information Science Book in 1974. It was declared a "major milestone in the literature of online systems" that "functioned for years as a textbook, handbook, and encyclopedia on all aspects of online retrieval systems".

Lancaster was an analytical thinker and a synthetic thinker and writer. His work on measurement and evaluation is a sound demonstration of both of these abilities. His books, The Measurement and Evaluation of Library Services and If You Want to Evaluate Your Library, have practical applications for those interested in engaging in evaluation studies.

== Contributions to information science ==
Lancaster participated in many international conferences and lecture series in Australia; Brazil; Canada; China; Colombia; Costa Rica; Denmark; Egypt; England; Finland; France; Germany; Guatemala; Hong Kong; India; Israel; Italy; Mexico; Namibia; the Netherlands; Norway; Poland; Portugal; Singapore; South Africa; Spain; Sri Lanka; Sweden; Syria; Taiwan; Tunisia; Turkey; and the West Indies.

In 1975 he edited the proceedings of the NATO Advanced Study Institute on the evaluation and scientific management of libraries and information centers.

He was a Fulbright professor at the Indian Statistical Institute (1991); in Denmark at the Royal School of Librarianship, (1985); and in Brazil at the Instituto Brasileiro de Informacao em Ciencia e Technologia, (1975).

== Teaching ==
In 1980 Lancaster was honored with the first Outstanding Teacher Award by the American Society for Information Science. He "introduced new approaches to education for information science expressed in a range of courses that were designed to prepare his students for a new kind of professional world that was in the making and to developments in which he was especially attuned".

Lancaster taught courses in information retrieval, bibliometrics, bibliographic organization, and the evaluation of library and information services.

He directed numerous doctoral dissertations, served on many doctoral committees and was especially supportive of international students. A list of dissertation committees on which he served is included in the 2008 Festschrift published in his honor.

== Library Trends ==
Lancaster edited the journal Library Trends from 1986 to 2006.

== Personal life ==
In a family tribute Cesaria Lancaster (Maria Cesaria Volpe), who married Frederick Wilfrid Lancaster in 1961, and his six children provided warm reflections of their life together.

At the time of his death he had thirteen grandchildren.

== Awards ==
- (1992) Best Information Science Book of the Year for Indexing and Abstracting in Theory and Practice (ASSIS&T)
- (1988) ASIS&T Award of Merit (1988)
- (1988) Inaugural recipient of "Outstanding Information Science Teacher Award", American Society for Information Science, 1980
- (1981) John Brubaker Award to recognize an outstanding work of literary merit for "The Future of the Librarian Lies Outside the Library", by the Catholic Library Association.
- (1979) Best Information Science Book of the Year for Information Retrieval Systems: Characteristics, Testing, and Evaluation
- (1978) Best Information Science Book of the Year for Toward Paperless Information Systems (ASSIS&T)
- (1974) Best Information Science Book of the Year for Information Retrieval On-line, F. Wilfrid Lancaster and E.G. Fayen
- (1969) Best JASIST Paper (1969) for "MEDLARS: Report on Evaluation of its Operating Efficiency"

== See also ==
- Document classification
- Information science
- Information scientist
- Information society
- Paperless society

== Selected works ==
- Lancaster, F. W. (1991/1998/2003). Indexing and Abstracting in Theory and Practice. London: Library Association. (1st ed. 1991; 2nd ed. 1998; 3rd. ed. 2003).
- Lancaster, F. W., & Pinto, M. (1999). Abstracts and abstracting in knowledge discovery. Library Trends, 48(1), 234–248.
- Lancaster, F. W. & Sandore, B. (1997). Technology and the Management of Library and Information Services. Champaign: University of Illinois, Graduate School of Library and Information Science.
- Lancaster, F. W. (Ed.). (1993). Libraries and the Future; Essays On the Library in the Twenty-First Century. New York : Haworth Press.
- Lancaster, F. W. (1988/1993). If You Want to Evaluate Your Library. Champaign: University of Illinois, Graduate School of Library and Information Science. (1st ed. 1988, 2nd ed. 1993).
- Lancaster, F. W. (1986). Vocabulary Control for Information Retrieval. 2nd. ed. Arlington, Va.: Information Resources Press.
- Lancaster, F. W. (1985). Thesaurus Construction and Use; a Condensed Course. Paris: General Information Programme and Unisist, Unesco.
- Lancaster, F. W. & Linda C. Smith. (1983). Compatibility Issues Affecting Information Systems and Services. Prepared for the General Information Programme and UNISIST. Paris: United Nations Educational, Scientific and Cultural Organization.
- Lancaster, F. W. (1982). Libraries and Librarians in an Age of Electronics. Arlington, Va.: Information Resources Press.
- Martyn, J. & Lancaster, F. W. (1981). Investigative Methods in Library and Information Science; an Introduction. Arlington, Va.: Information Resources Press.
- Lancaster, F. W. (1980), ed. The Role of the Library in an Electronic Society. Proceedings of the 1979 Clinic on Library Applications of Data Processing, April 1979, University of Illinois. Urbana-Champaign, IL: University of Illinois, Graduate School of Library Science.
- Lancaster, F. W. (1978). Toward Paperless Information Systems. New York: Academic Press.
- Baker, S. L. & Lancaster, F. W. (1977/1991). The Measurement and Evaluation of Library Services. 2nd ed. Arlington, Va.: Information Resources Press. (1st ed. 1977; 2nd ed. 1991).
- Lancaster, F. W. (1975). "Problems of communication in the operation of information storage and retrieval systems". In J. S. Petofi, et al. (Eds.), Fachsprache-Umgangssprache (pp. 317–347). Kronberg: Scriptor Verlag GmbH.
- Lancaster, F. W. & Fayen, E. G. (1973). Information Retrieval On-Line. Los Angeles: Melville Pub. Co.
- Lancaster, F. W. (1968a). Evaluation of the MEDLARS Demand Search Service. [Washington] U.S. Dept. of Health, Education, and Welfare, Public Health Service.
- Lancaster, F. W. (1968b). Information Retrieval Systems; Characteristics, Testing, and Evaluation. New York, Wiley.
