= Michael Seadle =

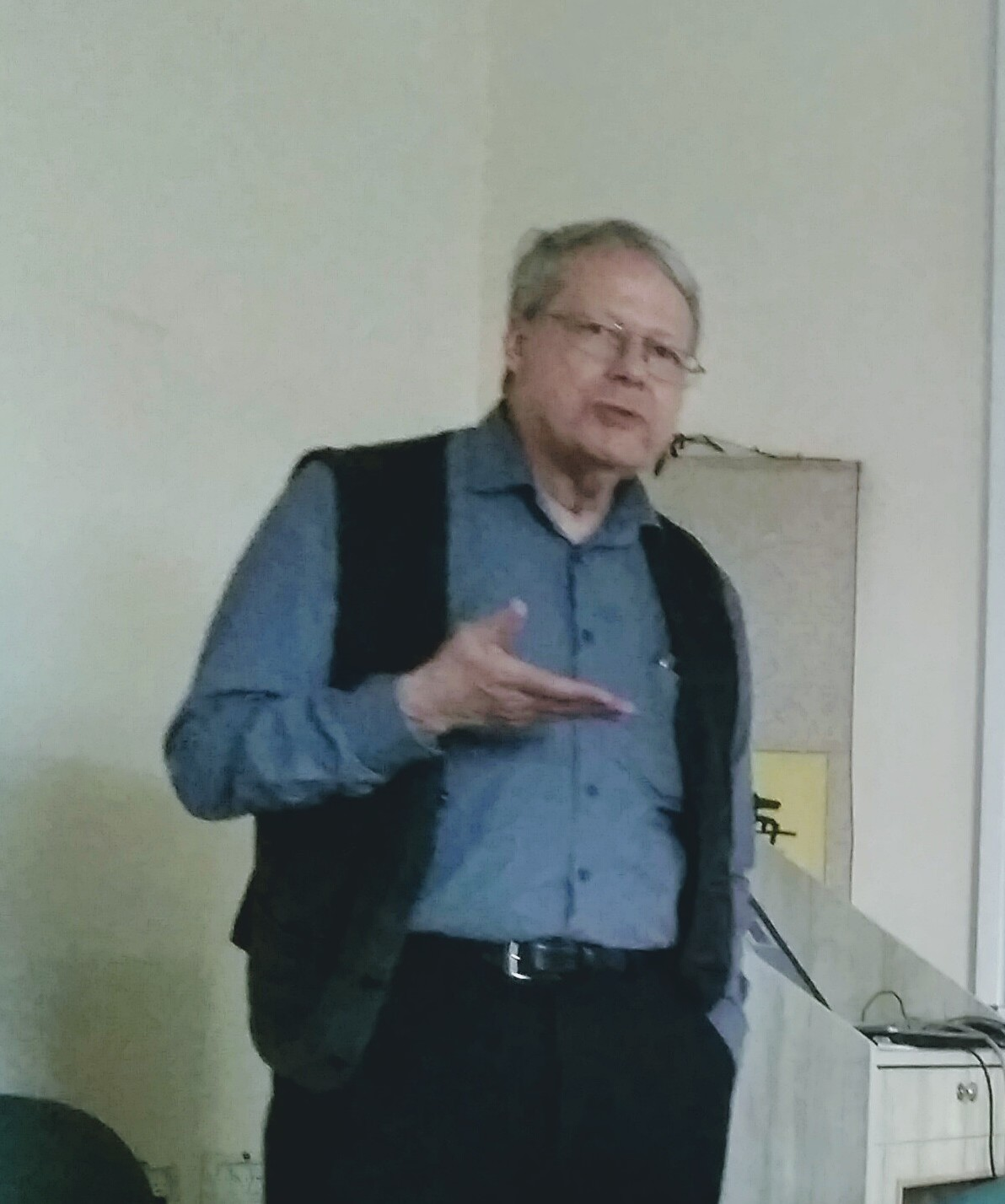
Michael Seadle giving a guest lecture in Bar-Ilan University (2019)

Michael S. Seadle (born 1950) is an information scientist and historian. Until he retired he was a professor for digital libraries at the Berlin School of Library and Information Science at Humboldt-Universitaet zu Berlin. He was Chair of the iSchools from 2014 to 2016. In 2017 he became the Executive Director with a term until March 2020. In 2016 he became one of the founders of the Humboldt-Elsevier Advanced Data and Text Centre (HEADT Centre) at Humboldt University of Berlin.

== Career ==
He received a BA in 1972 from Earlham College, and then a MA in 1973 and a Ph.D in history in 1977, from the University of Chicago. His thesis was called Quakerism in Germany: the pacifist response to Hitler. He became a supervisor at the library of the University of Chicago and later an assembly language programmer, data base manager, and systems analyst for various corporations. From 1986 to 1987, he was a lecturer at Northwestern University.

From 1987 to 1989, Seadle was assistant director of the Computer Center for Academic Computing and User Support Services at Eastern Michigan University in Ypsilanti, Michigan, and subsequently became assistant director of Library Technologies at Cornell University in Ithaca, New York. Between 1992 and 1996, he was president of Seadle Consulting in East Lansing. In 1997 he obtained a Master of Science in Information from the University of Michigan and received the Margaret Mann Award. From 1998 to 2006 he established the Digital and Multimedia Center Michigan State University library and became assistant director of the library.

In 2006 Seadle became a professor at the Berlin School of Library and Information Science at Humboldt University, and in 2010 dean of the Faculty of Arts I. In 2012 the Caucus of the iSchool group chose him as chair-elect with a term beginning in March, 2014, at the iConference in Berlin. He is currently retired.

== Books published ==
- Seadle, Michael, 2017, "Quantifying Research Integrity" (Morgan Claypool)
- Seadle, Michael, Chu, Clara, Stöckel, Ulrike, 2016, “Educating the Profession: 40 years of the IFLA Section on Education and Training” DeGruyter. IFLA Series.
