= Derek Austin =

British librarian (1921–2001)

Derek Austin (11 August 1921 – 22 May 2001) was a British librarian and author.

== Career ==
From 1963 to 1967, he was a Subject Editor at the British National Bibliography. He was also a developer of innovative digital cataloguing systems and the creator of the PRECIS indexing language in 1974, which was used worldwide and for the British National Bibliography. "His aim was to create an indexing system that would liberate indexers from the constraints of 'relative significance' (main entries). ...As by-products of his indexing theories he worked out drafts that in the mid-1980s were accepted as British and International Standards for examining documents, and for establishing multilingual and monolingual thesauri". PRECIS was an example of the application of syntactical devices in indexing. It was replaced at the British National Biography by COMPASS in 1996, which was later replaced by Library of Congress Subject Headings.

After 1974, Austin was head of the Subject System Office, The British Library.

== Awards ==
- 1976 Ranganathan Award, from FID/CR and the Documentation Research and Training Centre (Bangalore)
- 1978 Margaret Mann Citation, from the American Library Association
- 1982 Received his Ph.D. from Sheffield University

Austin was a supernumerary Fellow at Harris Manchester College, University of Oxford. He was also a member of the Royal Corps of Signals from 1941 to 1946.

== Published works ==
- Austin, Derek (1975). "The Role of Indexing in Subject Retrieval". In Henderson, K. L. (ed.). Major classification systems : the Dewey Centennial. Papers presented at the 21st Allerton Park Institute. Urbana, Il: Graduate School of Library Science. pp. 124–156. hdl:2142/1775. ISBN 0-87845-044-0. ISSN 0536-4604.
- Austin, Derek (January 1974). PRECIS: A Manual of Concept Analysis and Subject Indexing. London: Council of the British National Bibliography. ISBN 978-0-900220-42-5.

== See also ==
- Classification Research Group
