= Christopher Gutteridge =

Christopher Gutteridge (born 2 February 1976) is a Systems, Information and Web programmer, part of the IT Innovation team in the School of Electronics and Computer Science at the University of Southampton. He is known for being the lead developer for GNU EPrints and for being an advocate for Open Data, Linked Data and the Open Web.

== Notable achievements ==
Ted Nelson acknowledged Gutteridge's work, in 2001–2, creating an implementation of transquotation for Nelson's Xanadu project.

In May 2005 Gutteridge won the UK's Unix and Open Systems User Group award for his work on the Open Archive Software: GNU EPrints. The UKUUG awards an annual prize to give particular recognition to the development of free and open-source software in the UK.

In March 2011 Gutteridge launched data.southampton.ac.uk, which provides open access to a number of non-confidential administrative datasets at the University of Southampton and which won the 2012, Times Higher Education Award for Outstanding ICT Initiative of the Year.

In October 2017, Gutteridge was awarded the Jason Farradane Award for his outstanding contribution to the information profession
