= UCL Department of Information Studies =

Coordinates: 51.52356°N 0.13239°W

The Department of Information Studies is a department of the UCL Faculty of Arts and Humanities.

The School of Librarianship of the University of London was created in 1919 as a school of University College London. The school was the first school of librarianship that was full-time. The school was shut in 1939 and opened again in 1945. It later changed its name to School of Library, Archive and Information Studies and then to Department of Information Studies. The Department of Information Studies centenary was celebrated in the academic year 2019/2020.

The school formerly awarded a Diploma in Librarianship. From 1970 onwards, this Diploma was known as a Diploma in Library and Information Studies. From 1947, the school also awarded a Diploma in Archive Administration. From 1966, the school also awarded Master of Arts (MA, by examination), Master of Philosophy (MPhil) and Doctor of Philosophy (PhD) degrees in Librarianship or Archives (the MPhil and PhD degrees are awarded for a thesis or dissertation). From 1972, the school also awarded a Master of Science (MSc) degree in information studies. The Department currently offers taught postgraduate study in MA Archives and Records Management, MA/MSc Digital Humanities, MSc Knowledge, Information and Data Science (KIDS), MA Library and Information Studies, MA Publishing, and MRes in Information Studies. The MA Library and Information Studies is accredited by the Chartered Institute of Library and Information Professionals (CILIP), and the American Library Association (ALA). Scholarships and bursaries are available such as the scholarship awarded by the Worshipful Company of Stationers and Newspaper Makers.

== Reputation and Research ==
UCL Department of Information Studies is a centre for research in librarianship, information science, archives and records management, digital humanities and publishing. UCL is currently ranked 10th in the world, and is the UK's largest department of information studies. In September 2017, UCL was ranked fifth in the world for the study of arts and humanities.

The Department currently offers taught postgraduate study in MA Archives and Records Management, MA/MSc Digital Humanities, MSc Information Science, MA Library and Information Studies, Postgraduate Diploma in Library and Information Studies, MA Publishing, and MRes in Information Studies. The PG Dip/MA Library and Information Studies are accredited by Chartered Institute of Library and Information Professionals (CILIP), and the MA LIS is accredited by the American Library Association (ALA). The school is part of the iSchools consortium of information schools.

== Facilities ==
UCL is one of the main institutions in London's Knowledge Quarter, comprising the area around King's Cross, the Euston Road and Bloomsbury. The Department of Information Studies is located in the heart of UCL's Bloomsbury Campus, in Foster Court.

=== Libraries ===
The UCL library system comprises 17 libraries located across several sites within the main UCL campus and across Bloomsbury, linked together by a central networking catalogue and request system called Explore. The libraries contain a total of over 2 million books.

==== Main Library ====
UCL's Main Library is now the largest Library ar UCL but it originated as the Small Library in the Wilkins Building. It is located on the 1st floor of the Wilkins Building.

==== History ====
It is the earliest library opened in the Wilkins Building just over a year after the first UCL Librarian, Revd Dr Francis Augustus Cox was appointed in 1827. The first UCL Librarian, Revd Dr Francis Augustus Cox, was appointed in 1827.

The first purpose-built General Library opened in 1849 and was later renamed after the Professor of Architecture who designed it, Thomas Leverton Donaldson.

In 1907 the Library expanded to take up the whole length of the first floor of the Wilkins Building and became the Main Library. It is still very popular with students today and often appearing in films and television programmes.

It contains collections relating to the arts and humanities, economics, history, law and public policy.

== Directors ==
Each of the following persons was director of the School of Librarianship, the School of Library, Archive and Information Studies, or the Department of Information Studies, during the period specified after their name:

- Ernest A. Baker (1919–1934)
- John Duncan Cowley (1934–1944)
- Raymond Irwin (1944–1969)
- Prof. Arthur Brown (1969–1973)
- Brian Campbell Vickery (1973–1983)
- A. G. Watson (1984–1990)
- Robin C. Alston (1990–1995)
- Ia Mcllwaine (1995–2001)
- Susan Hockey (2001–2004)
- David Nicholas (2004–2011)
- Claire Warwick (2011–2013)
- Rob Miller (2013–2018)
- Elizabeth Shepherd (2018–2023)
- Charlie Inskip (2023–2024)
- Andreas Vlachidis (acting 2024)
- Elizabeth Lomas (2024-2025)
- Oli Duke Williams (2025- present)

== Research Centres ==
The Department is structured around four research centres, which also engage in interdisciplinary and cross-domain research.

- Centre for Digital Humanities
- ICARUS (International Centre for Archives and Records Management Research)
- Centre for Publishing
- Forum on Information Literacy
- KIDS (Knowledge Information and Data Science Group)

=== UCL Centre for Digital Humanities ===
The UCL Centre for Digital Humanities was founded in 2010. It offers research opportunities at postgraduate level, as well as short-courses. Its research is multidisciplinary, covering the intersection of digital technologies with the humanities.

=== ICARUS ===
The International Centre for Archives and Records Management Research was founded in 2005 and defines its research as the following:

Developing and contributing to an active, international, inclusive and sustainable network of critical and reflective thinking on archives and records management practice. Facilitating the ethical and effective utilisation of archives, records, information, heritage and the work of managing them, in support of wider societal goals including social justice, social cohesion and more equitable access to information.

=== Centre for Publishing ===
The Centre for Publishing offers a research-led MA in Publishing as well as the opportunity to engage with nearby publishing organisations in Central London. The Centre also engages in collaborative interdisciplinary research, in areas including information science, digital humanities, and library and archive studies. There is a strong emphasis on the digital aspects of publishing.

=== Forum on Information Literacy ===
Founded at UCL in 2019, the Forum on Information Literacy is a researchers' alliance with an interest in groundbreaking and disruptive research into information literacy in all its forms. It represents a space for academic researchers who are active in the field of information literacy research in the UK, to discuss and challenge ideas, and to engage in critical reflection on theory, practice and praxis oriented research, including the following goals:

- Identify the critical challenges that information literacy addresses and produce research, evidence and ideas that move the IL agenda forward nationally and globally
- Explore new theoretical and methodological approaches to deepen understanding of IL practice
- Address real world problems, encouraging and extending collaboration in, & co-production of, IL research via disciplinary, interdisciplinary and practitioner contexts
- Challenge and interrogate the discourse communities around IL research and contribute to deeper understanding of IL as a social practice.

=== Knowledge, Information and Data Science (KIDS) Group ===
KIDS is an active research group with interests and expertise that span across a number of disciplines including: AI, knowledge representation, reasoning about actions, natural language processing, probabilistic logics, non-monotonic logics, argumentation, Bayesian reasoning, statistical machine learning, data science and crowdsourcing. Their overarching research objective is to develop methodologies, algorithms and paradigms that build bridges between logic-based AI and statistical machine learning approaches, as well as finding practical applications in robust real-world applications. UCL Human Informatics (UCLHI) is an interest group within KIDS that collaborating with UCL Psychology and Brain Science explores multidisciplinary aspects of human activities with information systems.

KIDS facilitates PhD research in topics related to knowledge organisation, knowledge representation or knowledge-based reasoning, as well as interaction with research communities in the wider profession, including the International Society for Knowledge Organisation, the Universal Decimal Classification Consortium, and the Bliss Classification Association.

== Notable students and staff ==
- Library and Information Science
  - S. R. Ranganathan (b. 1892- d. 1972) - Mathematician and Librarian
  - Lynne Brindley (b. 1950) - first female Chief Executive of the British Library.
  - Richard Ovenden (b. 1964) - Bodley's Librarian, Bodleian Library, 2014–present.
  - Brian Vickery (b.1918- d.2009) - founder of the Classification Research Group, Director of SLAIS (now DIS) at UCL, 1973–1983.
  - David McKitterick (b. 1948–) - now Emeritus Honorary Professor of Historical Bibliography at Trinity College, Cambridge.
  - Andrew Dalby (b.1947)
  - Stephen Robertson (computer scientist) (b. 1946) - Now retired, Robertson is Professor Emeritus at City University, and a visiting professor in the Department of Computer Science at UCL. The Stephen Robertson prize for the best dissertation in the UCL MA/MSc in Digital Humanities is named after him.
  - Nicholas Belkin - Professor at the School of Communication and Information at Rutgers University
- Publishing
  - Iain Stevenson (d.2017) - Professor Emeritus in Publishing at the UCL Centre for Publishing.

== Early history of the Department ==
At the time of its opening, the School of Librarianship was advertised as being "organised so as to give a systematic training on a broad basis to Students who are already Librarians or who propose to adopt Librarianship as their profession. It will also be available for others who desire to increase their knowledge in one or other of the branches of its work."

Admission was subject to "such enquiries as [the Provost] may deem necessary in each case, and after receiving reports from the appropriate College officers. The Tutor to Women Students advises the Provost as to the admission of Women Students."

In its first session, 1919–1920, the following programme of study was available to students:

A. General Subjects

(Courses in Latin, English, French, German, other Modern Languages, History, and other Arts and Science subjects.)

B. Day Courses

1. Bibliography
2. Cataloguing and Indexing
3. Classification
4. Library Organisation
5. Public Library Law
6. Library Routine
7. Literary History and Book Selection
8. Palaeography and Archives
9. Demonstrations and Visits

C. Evening Courses

1. Cataloguing and Indexing
2. Literary History and Book Selection

D. Practical Instruction

E. Public Lectures.

== Awards ==
The UCL Department of Information Studies offers three prizes every year for the Library and Information Studies programme:

- Sir John MacAlister Medal founded in 1926 in the memory of Sir John MacAlister, who founded the School of Librarianship. The medal is awarded to the most distinguished candidate in the MA in Library and Information Studies.
- Cowley Prize founded in 1950 in memory of John D. Cowley, the late director of the School of Librarianship, with the royalties received from the publication entitled The Libraries in London, being a course of lectures given at the Easter Vacation Course in Librarianship in 1948; awarded to two distinguished candidates for the MA Degree in Library and Information Studies.
- Mary Piggott Prize in memory of Mary Piggott, who taught Cataloguing and Classification in the school from 1947–1974; awarded to a student on the MA or Postgraduate Diploma in LIS for outstanding achievement in Cataloguing and Classification.

The Archives and Records Management programme awards the following two prizes:

- Sir Hilary Jenkinson Prize in memory of Hilary Jenkinson, the archive theorist who influenced the University of London's decision to establish a Diploma in Archive Studies; awarded annually to a student of distinction in the MA in Archives and Records Management.
- Churchill-Jenkinson Prize awarded to an outstanding student on the Archives and Records Management programme.
