= Jack Mills (classification researcher) =

Jack Mills (1918 – 9 July 2010) was a British librarian and classification researcher, who worked for more than sixty years in the study, teaching, development and promotion of library classification and information retrieval, principally as a major figure in the British school of facet analysis which builds on the traditions of Henry E. Bliss and S.R. Ranganathan.

== Professional life ==
- 1947–48 Senior Assistant, Greenwich P. L.
- 1949–52 Librarian, City of London College
- 1952 British Bliss Classification Association committee member
- 1952 Member (later Chair) Classification Research Group
- 1952–62 Assistant Lecturer, North Western Polytechnic
- 1960 Chair of the Bliss Classification Association Committee
- 1963–64 Deputy Director, Aslib-Cranfield Project
- 1966–67 Library School, University of Maryland
- 1968 Lecturer, North Western Polytechnic
- 1973–84 Reader, School of Librarianship, Polytechnic (later University) of North London
- 1985 Retired

== BC2 ==
From the 1960s Jack Mills was the driving force behind the revision of the Bliss bibliographic classification, chairing the Bliss Classification Association Committee, and undertaking the greater part of the work of revision as Editor of the new scheme. He was a great admirer of Bliss's classification and used most of his life to develop a revised edition (BC2), a task he did not fulfil. The BC2 preserved the general structure of BC1, but the revised edition (BC2) is to all intents and purposes a new scheme of classification, realising the hopes of the Classification Research Group for the development of a new British scheme of classification.

== See also ==
- Classification Research Group
- Document classification
- Faceted classification
- Library and information science

== Bibliography of Jack Mills' works ==
- Brown, A. G., in collaboration with D. W. Langridge and J. Mills An introduction to subject indexing 2nd ed. London: Bingley, 1982
- Brown, A. G., in collaboration with D. W. Langridge and J. Mills Introduction to subject indexing: a programmed text. Vol. 1, Subject analysis and practical classification, Vol. 2, UDC and chain procedure in subject cataloguing. London: Bingley, 1976
- Cleverdon, C. W., Lancaster, F. W. and Mills, J. “Uncovering some facts of life in information retrieval.” Special libraries 55(2) 1964, 48–62
- Cleverdon, C. W., Mills, J. and Keen, M. Factors determining the performance of indexing systems. Cranfield: College of Aeronautics, 1966.
- Cleverdon, C. W. and Mills, J. “The testing of index language devices.” Aslib proceedings, 19 (6) 1967, 173–194.
- Daniel, R. and Mills, J. (for the Classification Research Group) A classification and thesaurus of library and information science. London: Polytechnic of North London, School of Librarianship, 1972.
- Lancaster, F. W. and Mills, J. “Testing indexes and index language devices: the Aslib-Cranfield Project.” American documentation, 15(1) 1964, 4–13
- Langridge, D., Mills, J. and Perrault, J. Indexing for ERIC: a programmed course. School of Library and Information Services, University of Maryland, 1967.
- Mills, J. “The Bibliographic Classification” in Kent, A. and Lancour, H. (eds.) Encyclopedia of library and information science, Vol. 2 1969, 368–80.
- Mills, J. “The Bibliographic Classification” in Maltby, Arthur (ed.) Classification in the 1970s: a discussion of development and prospects for the major schemes. London: Bingley 1972, 25–52.
- Mills, J. “The Bibliographic Classification” in Maltby, A. (ed) Classification in the 1970s: a second look. London: Bingley, 1976, 25–50.
- Mills, J “The Bliss and Colon Classifications.” Library Association record, 53 1951, 146–53
- Mills, J. “Bliss Bibliographic Classification” in Prytherch, Ray (ed.) Harrod's librarians' glossary and reference book : a directory of over 10,200 terms, organisations, projects and acronyms in the areas of information management, library science, publishing and archive management. 10th ed. Aldershot: Ashgate, 2005.
- Mills, J.“Chain indexing and the classified catalogue.” Library Association record, 57(4) 1955, 141–148.
- Mills, J. “Classification” in Sewell, P. H. Five year's work in librarianship 1951–55. London: Library Association, 1958, 216–44
- Mills, J. “Classification” in Sewell, P. H. Five year's work in librarianship 1956–60. London: Library Association, 1963, 237–267
- Mills, J. “Classification of a subject field.” Classification Research Group Bulletin no.2, March 1957, B1. (Preprint of papers to be presented at the International Study Conference on Classification for Information Retrieval, Dorking, May 1957).
- Mills, J “Classifying by Bliss.” Library Association record, 52 1950, 370–2
- Mills, J. “A comment on the article by R. A. Ukoh 'Library classification and change: the example of Bliss'. Libri, 25, 168)” Libri 26 (2) June 76, 156–157.
- Mills, J. “A common language for information retrieval.” Publisher, 181 (4948) Dec 68, 32–33
- Mills, J. “Composite classification in the BC.” Bliss Classification bulletin, 2(1) 1957, 6–15
- Mills, J. “Dr. Ranganathan and the study of classification” in Library science in India. Madras, 1953, 38–41
- Mills, J. “Faceted classification and logical division in information retrieval.” Library trends, 52(3) 2004, 541–70
- Mills, J. Guide to the Universal decimal classification (BS 1000C). London: British Standards Institution, 1963
- Mills, J. “Inadequacies of existing general classification schemes” in Some problems of a general classification scheme. London: Library Association, 1964, 32–37
- Mills, J. “Indexing a classification scheme.” Indexer, 2(2) 1960, 44–8
- Mills, J. “Information retrieval: a revolt against conventional systems?” Aslib proceedings,16(2) 1964, 48–63
- Mills, J. “Introductory address” (a paper on faceted classification) Knowledge organisation for information retrieval. Proceedings of the Sixth International Conference on Classification Research. University College London 16–18 June 1997 The Hague: FID, 1997, 1–11
- Mills, J. A modern outline of library classification. London: Chapman and Hall, 1960
- Mills, J. “The new Bliss Classification.” Catalogue and Index, (40) 1976, 3–6.
- Mills, J. “A new edition of Bliss.” Catalogue and index, (17) 1970, 8–9.
- Mills, J. “Number building and filing order in BC.” Bliss classification bulletin 2 (10), March 1957
- Mills, J. “Prcoordination et hirarchie dans l’indexation.” Le Bulletin des bibliothques de France, Sept–Oct 1965, 331–46
- Mills, J. “Progress in documentation: library classification.” Journal of Documentation, 26(2)June 70, 120–160
- Mills, J. “Ranganathan’s ‘Prolegomena’ and ‘Colon Classification’.” Library Association record, 60(5) 1958, 152–4
- Mills, J. Registration classification and cataloguing revised edition. Purley: London and Home Counties Branch of the Library Association, 1960
- Mills, J. “Review of the Bibliographic Classification.” Library Association record, 1953, 298–300
- Mills, J. “Some current problems of classification for information retrieval.” Classification Society bulletin, 1(4) 1968, 18–27
- Mills, J. The Universal decimal classification (Rutgers series on systems for the intellectual organisation of information ed. by Susan Artandi, Vol. 1) Rutgers: New Brunswick 1964
- Mills, J. “Using classification in teaching indexing.” Journal of documentation, 21(4) 1965, 279–86
- Mills, J. and Broughton, V. Bliss bibliographic classification. 2nd ed. London: Butterworths, 1977–1987; Bowker-Saur, 1990–1999; Mnchen: Saur, 2007–
- Mills, J. and McCann, W. The organisation of information in the construction industry (SfB Agency UK Development paper no. 3) London: Royal Institute of British Architects, 1968
