= Emilia Currás =

Spanish information scientist and academic (1927–2020)

Emilia Teresa Julia Currás Puente
- Born: 8 October 1927; Madrid, Spain
- Died: 29 March 2020 (aged 92); Madrid, Spain
- Education: Complutense University of Madrid; University of Santiago de Compostela; Technische Universität Berlin
- Occupation: Information scientist

Emilia Teresa Julia Currás Puente (8 October 1927 – 29 March 2020) was a Spanish information scientist and academic. She was also a philosopher and historian of science, as well as a pioneer in the study of the philosophical-scientific bases of Information and documentation.

== Biography and career ==
She was born in Madrid on 8 October 1927 from Galician parents Currás and her family lived through the Spanish Civil War in Alberic, Valencia. After the war, the family moved to Tetuan where her mother worked as a teacher. In the middle of the 1940s, they returned to Madrid and Emilia Currás studied at the Lope de Vega secondary school. She graduated from Chemical Sciences at the Complutense University of Madrid and the University of Santiago de Compostela in 1953. She worked at the Faculty of Veterinary Medicine as a research fellow in the Chair of Chemistry and at the Spanish National Research Council until 1955, when she entered Technische Universität Berlin to pursue doctoral studies, being invested as such in 1959.

She joined a private company in 1960, founding the Chemistry and Technical Translation Section of Hanumag-Barreiros (Madrid), moving a year later to the company Auxini-Piritas Españolas as head of the Documentation Department until 1964. She returned to Germany to become head of the Materials Analysis Laboratory of Linde AG (Köln-Suhn) in 1965, where she also enrolled at the Institute of Documentation in Frankfurt/Main, obtaining the title of Scientific Documentalist in 1966.

She continued in Germany until 1968 as head of the patent documentation section at Dynamit Nobel (Troisdorf). In 1969 she returned to Spain to found and direct the Documentation Department at Hispanoil (Madrid).

In 1970 she left the private industry sector to join the Faculty of Sciences of the Autonomous University of Madrid and to direct the Scientific Documentation Office within the Department of Applied Chemistry-Physics.

On 3 May 1988 she was named a member of the Spain's Royal Academy of Doctors.

== Fields of work ==
=== Philosophy and history of science ===
Her most notable contribution is the creation of the Theory of Informationism and the Vertical Integration of Science, which appeared in 1981 and was accepted in 1988. Informationism was a new epistemology based on the neural theory of Information, or neural networks, where information reaches our brain in the form of tiny impulses called quanta of information that impact our neurons, activating them and converting these quanta into useful information.

According to Currás, this theory considers information as the axis of our life and as the motor of all neuronal and physical evolution of the human being; that is, the more useful information our brain receives, the greater our neuronal tissue will be, creating the beginning of the path of development of civilization and culture of any people.

Informationism is based on the paradigm of the universality of information, which is independent in itself as a scientific discipline, but which is systemically and vertically related to the other sciences.

=== Documentation ===
In this field, she was a pioneer in Spain and in many Spanish-speaking countries. She introduced the concept of Documentation Sciences as a nucleus that housed the different disciplines related to the processes of information contained in a document so that it can reach the user quickly, unequivocally and efficiently. She worked on the design and construction of a thesaurus, contributing with the creation of three manuals, where the thesaurus was approached from different perspectives: documentary linguistics, systems theory, ontology, taxonomy, information theory, computer science, etc.

In 1976 she founded the Spanish Society for Scientific Information and Documentation (SEDIC) in 1976, and was its president for twelve years. She was a founding member of Hispano Term and ASEABI. She was also a member of the Council of the International Federation for Documentation (FID) for eight years.

She was a member of the advisory and editorial boards of several journals such as the Journal of Information Science. She was also a member of organizations such as the American Library Association (ALA), the International Society for Knowledge Organization (ISKO) and the Prof. Kaula Foundation, among others.

=== Chemistry ===
She did research on molten antimony tribromide as an ionizing solvent (the subject of her thesis) resulting in the discovery of five new compounds, which were registered in the Index Chemicus database. She obtained an Excellent Cum Laude qualification. As a result of her research in this field, she was awarded the title of European Chemist by EURCHEN on several occasions. She was a member of the Ilustre Colegio Oficial de Química (1993) and belonged to the Real Sociedad de Químicos de España (1988).

== Death ==
Currás died on 29 March 2020 at the age of 92 in Madrid from COVID-19 during the COVID-19 pandemic in Spain.

== Publications ==
She published more than 130 research articles in Spanish and foreign journals. She wrote 14 books and 7 as collective publications. Her work has been translated into English, Portuguese, Arabic and Czech, and has received more than 200 citations.

Her publications include:

- Information Science on Systemic and Systematic Postulates (2008).
- Ontologies, Taxonomies, and Thesauri (2005)
- Thesauri. Manual of construction and use (1998)
- Treatise on Information Science (1996)
- Thesauri. Terminological Languages (1991)
- Information in its New Aspects: Documentation Sciences (1988)
- Documentation Sciences: Library Science, Archival Science, Documentation and Information (1982).
- In 2003, ISKO published a tribute book entitled Una vida: profesión y pasión (A life: profession and passion).

Emilia Currás also wrote poetry, a passion she began at the age of 16, collected in three collections of poems: Fugitiva del tiempo, Del pasar y corre amor, En una tarde tibia and El rincón de mis pensamientos.

== Selected awards ==
Among the numerous awards she received are:

- Gold Medal of the Prof. Kaula Foundation (1990).
- Fellow of the Institute for Information Scientists, London (1992).
- FEDINE Medal of Technological Merit (1997).
- Honorary President of ISKO-Spain (1998).
- Gold Badge of the Deutsche Gesellschaft für Information und Wissen (DGI), the German Society of Information Specialists (2002).
- Woman of the Year 2004 of The American Biographical Institute, being included in its yearbook Great women of the 21st Century.
- The King's College of Cambridge (UK) included her in the Outstanding Intellectuals of the 21st Century (2004).
- Honorary Member of the Hispanic Association of Internet Documentalists (AHDI) since 2004.
- Gold and Brilliant Badge of the Association of Chemists of Madrid (2011).
- Numerary member of the International Brotherhood of Researchers of Toledo and honorary member of the SEDIC since 2013.
- Member of the Club of Rome.
- Knight's Cross awarded by the government of Colombia.
- She was decorated and honored by the universities of Düsseldorf, Zaragoza, Brasilia, San Marcos de Lima, Autónoma of Madrid, Opavá (Czech Republic), Complutense of Madrid and University of La Manouba (Tunisia).
