= Jason Farradane =

British librarian (1906–1989)

Jason Farradane (born Jason Lewkowitsch; 29 September 1906 – 27 June 1989) was a British librarian of Polish descent.

== Life ==
The son of the chemical engineer Julius Lewkowitsch, Farradane graduated in chemistry in 1929 at what is now Imperial College London and started work in industry as a chemist and documentalist. After working in research at the Ministry of Supply and the Admiralty during World War II, he first made an impact with a paper on the scientific approach to documentation at a Royal Society Scientific Information Conference in 1948.

Farradane is accredited for first use of the term information science, in which he recognized library science and information science as disparate, yet joint areas of study. He was instrumental in establishing the Institute of Information Scientists in 1958 and the first academic courses in information science in 1963, at what eventually became City University, London and where he became Director of the Centre for Information Science in 1966.

Of Central European origin, his commitment to science was reflected in the name he created for himself – a combination of Faraday and Haldane, two scientists he particularly admired. On the research side his main contributions lay in relational analysis, a precursor to work in the area of artificial intelligence, and the concept of information.

== Awards ==
The Institute of Information Scientists established the Jason Farradane Award in his honour in 1979, and awarded it to him in its first year.

== Publications (selected) ==
- 1948: 'The Scientific Approach to Documentation', Royal Scientific Scientific Information Conference
- 1966: Information Retrieval by Relational Indexing: a report on research being carried out at Northampton College of Advanced Technology. Part I: Methodology. London: The City University, Department of Management Studies, Information Science (with Mrs S. Datta, R. K. Poulton)
- 1973: "Problems in Information Retrieval: Logical Jumps in the Expression of Information." Information Storage and Retrieval, 9(2) 65-77 (with J. M. Russell, and Penelope A. Yates-Mercer)
- 1977: Relational indexing. London, Ontario: University of Western Ontario School of Library and Information Science
- 1978: "Estimation and Reliability of Retrieval Effectiveness Measures," Information Processing & Management, 14(1) 1-16 (with Jean Tague)
  - Abstract: A probabilistic model of the retrieval process is presented. From it, the standard errors of system recall and precision estimators, based on a sample of queries, are derived. The resulting negative binomial model is fitted to empirical data from several retrieval tests. (School of Library and Information Science, The University of Western Ontario, London, Ontario, Canada.)
- 1979: "The Nature of Information," in: G. Walker, ed., The Information Environment: a reader. pp. 4–11. G. K. Hall & Co.
  - "'information' should be defined as any physical form of representation, or surrogate, of knowledge, or of a particular thought, used for communication." (p. 4)

== See also ==
- Classification Research Group
- Jason Farradane Award
- Institute of Information Scientists
- Information science
- Artificial intelligence
- City University, London
  - Stephen E. Robertson
  - Nicholas J. Belkin
