= Paperless society =

A paperless society is a society in which paper communication (written documents, email, letters, etc.) is replaced by electronic communication and storage. The concept was first introduced by Frederick Wilfrid Lancaster in 1978. Furthermore, libraries would no longer be needed to handle printed documents. "Librarians will, in time, become information specialists in a deinstitutionalized setting". Lancaster also stated that both computers and libraries will not always give us the information that other people and living life will.

== Literature ==
- Brodman, E. (1979). Review of Toward Paperless Information Systems. Bulletin of the Medical Library Association, 67(4), 437–439.
- Buckland, M. K. (1980). Review of Toward Paperless Information Systems. Journal of Academic Librarianship, 5(6), 349.
- Grosch, A. (1979). Review of Toward Paperless Information Systems. College & Research Libraries, 40(1), 88–89.
- Kohl, D. F. (2004). From the editor . . . The paperless society . . . Not quite yet. Journal of Academic Librarianship, 30(3), 177–178.
- Lancaster, F. W. (1978a). Toward paperless information systems. New York: Academic Press.
- Lancaster, F. W. (1980b). The future of the librarian lies outside of the library. Catholic Library World, 51, 388–391.
- Lancaster, F. W. (1982a). Libraries and librarians in an age of electronics. Arlington, VA: Information Resources Press.
- Lancaster, F. W. (1982b). The evolving paperless society and its implications for libraries. International Forum on Information and Documentation, 7(4), 3–10.
- Lancaster, F. W. (1983). Future librarianship: Preparing for an unconventional career. Wilson Library Bulletin, 57, 747–753.
- Lancaster, F. W. (1985). The paperless society revisited. American Libraries, 16, 553–555.
- Lancaster, F. W. (1993). Libraries and the future: Essays on the library in the twenty-first century. New York: Haworth Press.
- Lancaster, F. W. (1999). Second thoughts on the paperless society. Library Journal, 124(15), 48– 50.
- Lancaster, F. W., & Smith, L. C. (1980c). On-Line systems in the communication process: Projections. Journal of the American Society for Information Science, 31(3), 193–200.
- Miall, D. S. (2001). The library versus the Internet: Literary studies under siege? Proceedings of the Modern Language Association, 116(5), 1405–1414.
- Salton, G. (1979). Review of Toward Paperless Information Systems. Journal of Documentation, 35(3), 250–252.
- Sellen, A. J., & Harper, R. H. R. (2003). The myth of the paperless office. Cambridge, MA: MIT Press.
- Stevens, N. D. (2006). The fully electronic academic library. College & Research Libraries, 67(1),5–14.
- Young, Arthur P. (2008).Aftermath of a Prediction: F. W. Lancaster and the Paperless Society LIBRARY TRENDS, 56(4),(“The Evaluation and Transformation of Information Systems: Essays Honoring the Legacy of F. W. Lancaster,” edited by Lorraine J. Haricombe and Keith Russell), pp. 843–858.

== See also ==
- Digital media
- Information society
- Paperless office
