= Elsa Lewkowitsch =

British research chemist

Dr Elsa Lewkowitsch A.R.C.S.
- Born: 1903
- Died: 1980 (aged 76–77)
- Citizenship: British
- Education: Department of Chemical Engineering, Imperial College London
- Scientific career
- Fields: Chemistry of oils and fats

Phyllis Regina Elsa Lewkowitsch (1903–1980), Ph.D., A.R.C.S., was a British research chemist, the daughter of Julius Lewkowitsch and Katherine Julia Morris.

Lewkowitsch was the first female student at the Department of Chemical Engineering, Imperial College London, and graduated top of her year. She continued her father's research into oils and fats, and was a contributor to the 14th edition of the Encyclopædia Britannica (1929–30). In the 1930s she prepared a seventh edition of her father's The Chemical Technology and Analysis of Oils, Fats and Waxes (first edition 1895; sixth edition 1923), but publication was prevented by the Second World War.

By her will she established a bequest to found the Society of Chemical Industry's biennial Julius Lewkowitsch Memorial Lecture in memory of her father.

== Publications ==
- Elsa Lewkowitsch, The ultra-violet absorption spectrum of chlorophyll in alcoholic solution, Biochemical Journal 22/3 (1928); DOI: 10.1042/bj0220777
