= Syracuse University School of Information Studies =

Information science school at Syracuse University

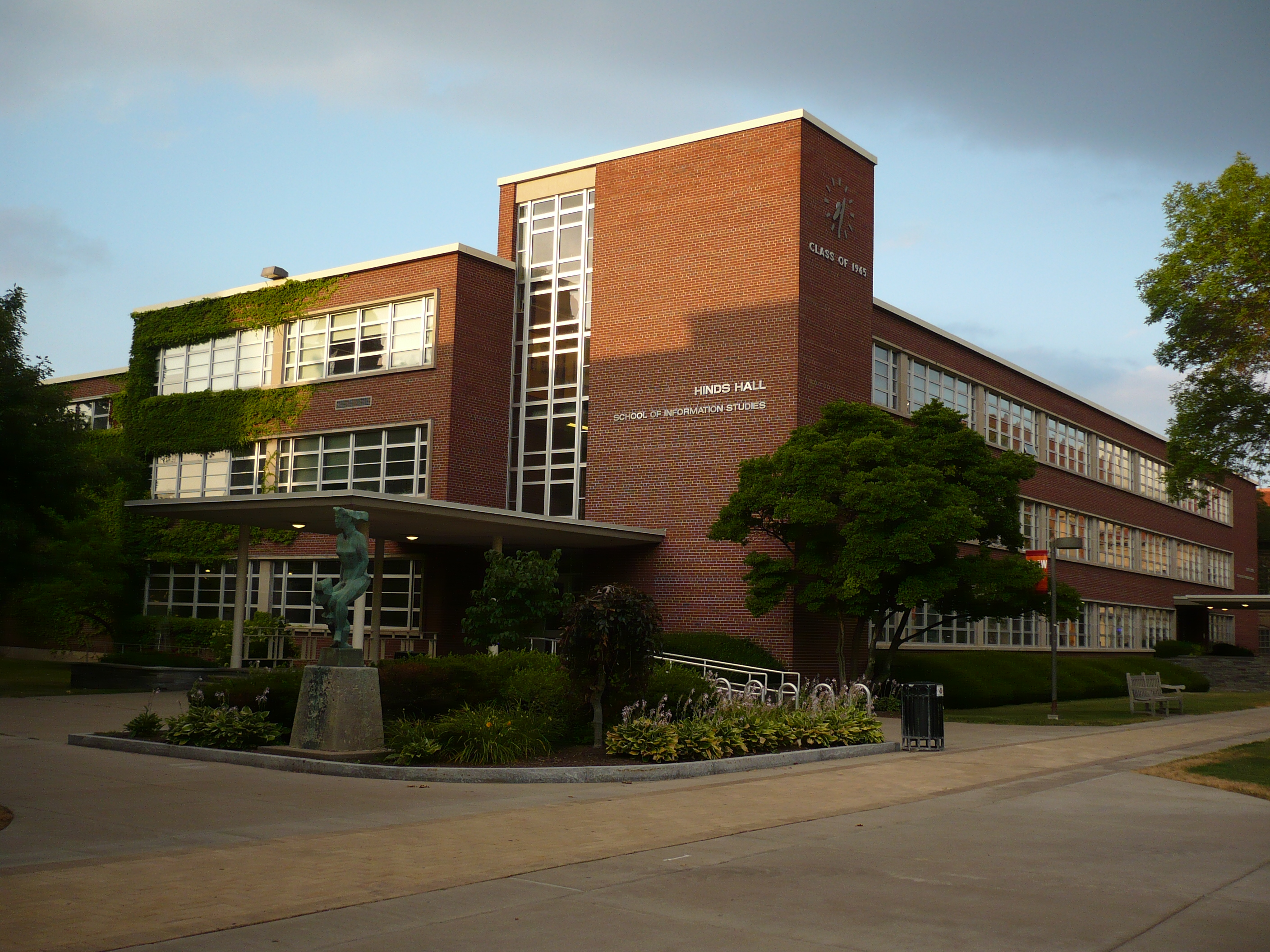
- Hinds Hall, location of the School of Information Studies
- Former names: School of Library Science (1896–1974)
- Motto: The Original School for the Information Age
- Type: Private
- Established: 1896; 130 years ago
- Parent institution: Syracuse University
- Dean: Jeffrey Rubin (interim)
- Location: Syracuse, New York, United States; 43°2′17.6″N 76°8′0.1″W
- Campus: Urban
- Website: ischool.syr.edu

The Syracuse University School of Information Studies, commonly known as the iSchool, is one of the 13 schools and colleges of Syracuse University. It acts as a center for research and education in the policy, systems, service, and technology aspects of information management, information science, and library science. Established in 1896 as the School of Library Science, its name was changed in 1974 to reflect the growing information field. Syracuse University was the first library school to change its name in this way, hence its claim as "the original school for the information age." Starting in the 1970s, the school began to add new programs focused on information studies that aim to merge technology and management skills with an emphasis on human needs and behavior.

== History ==
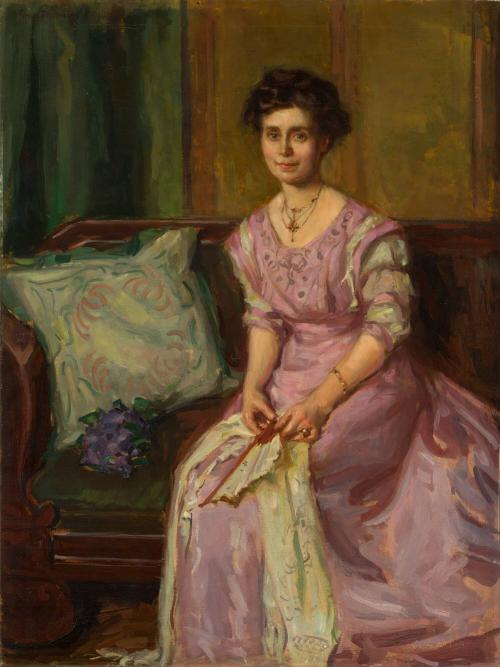
Mary Jane O'Bryon Sibley, portrait by Frank Townsend Hutchens

The first library science courses were offered at Syracuse University in 1896 at the University’s von Ranke library, with university librarian Henry Orrin Sibley and his wife Mary Jane O'Bryon Sibley as the first and only instructors. In 1907, the program moved to the University's Carnegie Library, and, in 1908, it received accreditation from the American Library Association. The program eventually split from the College of Liberal Arts in 1915 and began granting graduate degrees in 1934.

The School of Information Studies emerged in 1974 when Dean Robert S. Taylor suggested the School of Library Science adopt a name that would signal a new direction. With this, it became the first "iSchool" (also the Original Information School™) in history.

Throughout the 1970s, he updated the library science curriculum to keep pace with the changing times. In 1977, the Education Resources Information Center (ERIC/AE) Clearinghouse was launched at the school. The country’s first master's degree in information resources management (IRM) was added to the curriculum in 1980.

The 1980s marked an increase in faculty research and grants that established the School of Information Studies as a leader in the field. During this time, the undergraduate program in information management and technology was introduced. In 1983, the school moved from its old home in several large houses on the edge of campus to Huntington Hall. Syracuse was the founding member of the first iSchools Caucus formed in 1988, termed the Gang of Three with Pittsburgh, and Drexel. The school's offices and classrooms moved again in 1989 to the Center for Science and Technology, which also housed the Chemistry and Computer Science programs, among others.

The 1990s brought many innovations to the school, including the master's degree program in telecommunications and network management; AskERIC, one of the first digital reference services; and distance learning options for graduate study. Several new research centers opened, including the Convergence Center, the Center for Digital Commerce, and the Center for Natural Language Processing.

As the new millennium approached, the school had outgrown its space in the Center for Science and Technology. Dean Raymond von Dran began working toward establishing a new home for the iSchool on campus, announcing his vision for the school's permanent home on the Syracuse University Quad. In 2008, von Dran's vision was realized when the School of Information Studies celebrated the iOpening of a completely redesigned Hinds Hall. The building, with its sleek and modern design, earned the American Institute of Architects Central New York Chapter Citation Award that same year.

== Curriculum ==
The School of Information Studies offers two undergraduate degrees, six master's degrees, and two doctoral degrees, as well as several certificates of advanced study.

- Two Bachelor of Science programs are offered, one in Information Management and Technology focuses on information systems and personal services, and another on Applied Data Analytics. The programs offer courses in data analytics, data visualization, research methods, management principals, and cybersecurity. The Innovation Society and Technology program was sunset in 2026.
- The Master of Science in Information Systems for Executives is for students with six or more years of appropriate full-time professional experience in the information management field and who demonstrate appropriate professional qualifications may apply into the Master of Science in Information Management: Executive Track. Those who are accepted into the executive track may waive the internship requirement, and reduce the number of credit hours required for the degree to 30. This M.S. in Information Management degree program can be completed on campus, online, or a combination of both options.
- The Master of Science in Information Systems is an interdisciplinary program covering topics in information science, information technology, and management. An executive version of the program is offered to students who already have substantial experience. Graduates work in IT, project management, and consulting at corporations, non-profits, and government agencies. The program has been ranked fourth in the nation by U.S. News & World Report.
- The Masters in Applied Human Centered Human Intelligence, launched in Fall 2025, offers courses in responsible AI, Natural Language Processing, and other AI-centered coursework.
- The Master of Science in Library and Information Science (MSLIS), ranked third in the nation by U.S. News & World Report and accredited by the American Library Association, teaches traditional library knowledge, as well as technical and leadership skills. The school also offers an MSLIS with a concentration in school media, ranked fourth in the nation by U.S. News.
- The Master of Science in Applied Data Science prepares students with practical analytical and technical skills to apply analytical concepts to gain insight from small and large datasets.
- The Ph.D. in Information Science and Technology facilitates in-depth study of information in a variety of settings and incorporates theory and research from many academic disciplines. Graduates of the doctoral program go on to careers in the library, information, computer, and management sciences departments at universities and research centers.

Online options include: a Master of Science in Applied Data Science, a Master of Science in Information Management, a Master of Science in Library and Information Science, and a Master of Science in Library and Information Science: School Media.

The school also offers certificates of advanced study in the management of information security, information systems, telecommunications networks, digital libraries, school library media centers, and cultural heritage preservation.

== iSchools Caucus ==
Syracuse's School of Information Studies formed part of the original "gang of three" that established the iSchools Caucus. Now consisting of over 65 schools around the world, the members of the iSchools Caucus foster scholarship at the intersections between information, people, and technology.

== Deans ==
=== School of Library Science ===
- Wharton Miller, 1952–1956
- Wayne S. Yenawine, 1956–1964
- Antje Lemke (interim dean), 1964–1965
- Edward B. Montgomery, 1965–1968
- Roger C. Greer, 1968–1972
- Robert Saxton Taylor, 1972–1974

=== School of Information Studies ===
- Robert Saxon Taylor, 1974–1981
- Evelyn Daniel, 1981–1985
- Jeffrey Katzer, interim 1985–1987
- Donald A. Marchand, 1987–1994
- Jeffery Katzer, interim 1994–1995
- Raymond von Dran, 1995–2007
- Elizabeth Liddy, 2008–2015
- Jeffrey Stanton, interim 2015–2016
- Elizabeth Liddy, 2016–2019
- David Seaman, interim 2019
- Raj Dewan, 2020–2022
- David Seaman, interim 2022–2023
- Andrew Sears, 2023–2024
- Jeff Hemsley, interim 2024–2026
- Jeffrey Rubin, interim 2026–
