= Liz Liddy =

American computer scientist (1944–2025)

- Born: May 12, 1944; Dayton, Ohio, U.S.
- Died: August 21, 2025 (aged 81); Charlotte, North Carolina, U.S.
- Education: Syracuse University (PhD); Daemen College (BS)
- Known for: Natural language processing
- Scientific career
- Workplaces: SU School of Information Studies
- Thesis: The discourse-level structure of natural texts : an exploratory study of empirical abstracts (1988)
- Website: ischool.syr.edu/liz-liddy/

Elizabeth DuRoss Liddy (May 12, 1944 – August 21, 2025) was an American computer scientist and academic who was professor of information science and dean of the Syracuse University School of Information Studies. She was a pioneer in the field of natural language processing.

== Early life and education ==
Liddy was born in Dayton, Ohio, on May 14, 1944, and grew up in Utica, New York. She was one of five children, all of whom worked in her father's family business. Liddy attended St. Francis DeSalle High School, where she was awarded a Regent's Scholarship, and eventually attended Daemen College. She was literary editor of her high school year book and edited a literary magazine during her time at college. At Daemen College Liddy studied English language and literature. After graduating Liddy remained in New York, where she volunteered in an elementary school library. She joined the Syracuse University School of Information Studies in 1983, where she started a graduate program in library science. She worked as a faculty librarian at Onondaga Community College whilst earning her degree. Here Liddy worked as a Visiting assistant professor, whilst completing her doctorate part-time in information transfer. Her dissertation research involved natural language processing, a computerized approach to analyzing text. She was hired to the faculty at Syracuse University whilst completing her PhD.

== Research and career ==
In 1994 Liddy was the founding President of TextWise, a semantics-based search engine. The first product she developed was called Document Retrieval Using Linguistic Knowledge (DR-LINK). She left TextWise in 1999, after growing the number of employees to over 50. She started the Syracuse University Center for Natural Language Processing in 1999, and was honored with the university's Outstanding Alumni Award the following year.

Liddy was appointed Dean of the School of Information Studies (iSchool) in 2008, and held the position for over ten years. She temporarily left the role in 2015. The school was transformed under her leadership, increasing the enrollment of students by over 70% and launching a graduate certificate in data science. She raised over $20 million to support research and development at Syracuse University.

She chaired the iSchool Organization, which connects information science schools all over the world, from 2012 to 2014. Liddy worked to increase the representation of women at the iSchool, through initiatives such as the IT Girls Overnight Retreat – an annual weekend to introduce high school girls to Information Technology. She improved the career development programs of students at Syracuse University, increasing student employment to almost 100% post graduation. Liddy retired as Dean of the iSchool in 2019.

=== Selected innovations ===
- US 6026388, Liddy, Elizabeth D., "User interface and other enhancements for natural language information retrieval system and method", published August 16, 1995, issued February 15, 2000
- US 5963940, Liddy, Elizabeth D., "Natural language information retrieval system and method", published August 16, 1995, issued October 5, 1999
- US 6006221, Liddy, Elizabeth D., "Multilingual document retrieval system and method using semantic vector matching", published August 16, 1995, issued December 21, 1999

== Personal life and death ==
Liddy was married shortly after graduating Daemen College in 1966. She had three children.

Liddy died in Charlotte, North Carolina, on August 21, 2025, at the age of 81.
