= Classification Research Group =

Library science organisation

The Classification Research Group (CRG) was a significant contributor to classification research and theory in the field of library and information science in the latter half of the 20th century. It was formed in England in 1952 and was active until 1968. Informal meetings continued until 1990. Among its members were Derek Austin, Eric Coates, Jason Farradane, Robert Fairthorne, Douglas Foskett, Barbara Kyle, Derek Langridge, Jack Mills, Pauline Atherton Cochrane, Phyllis Richmond, Bernard Palmer, Jack Wells, and Brian Campbell Vickery. The group formed important principles on faceted classification and also worked on the theory of integrative levels.

== Publications ==
- 1955. The need for a faceted classification as the basis for all methods of information retrieval. Library Association Record, 57(7), 262–268.
- 1958. Classification Research Group Bulletin No. 4. Journal of Documentation, 14( 3), 136–143.
- 1959. Classification Research Group Bulletin No. 5. Journal of Documentation, 15(1), 39–57.
- 1961. Classification Research Group Bulletin No. 6. Journal of Documentation, 17(3), 156–172.
- 1962. Classification Research Group Bulletin No. 7. Journal of Documentation, 18( 2), 65–88.
- 1964. Classification Research Group Bulletin No. 8. Journal of Documentation, 20(3), 146–169.
- 1968. Classification Research Group Bulletin No. 9. Journal of Documentation, 24(4), 273–298.
- 1969. Classification and information control: Papers representing the work of the Classification Research Group during 1960-1968. London: Library Association.

== See also ==
- Document classification
- Knowledge organization
- Subject (documents)
