= John Duncan Cowley =

British librarian

John Duncan Cowley FLA (1897–20 August 1944) was Director of the School of Librarianship of the University of London from 1934 to 1944 and was the Goldsmiths' Librarian in 1944. He joined the RAFVR in 1940 and was a Squadron Leader at the time of his death.

== Works ==
Cowley is the author of A Bibliography of Abridgments, Digests, Dictionaries, and Indexes of English Law to the Year 1800, which was published by the Selden Society in London in 1932. It is "valuable" and "thoroughly commendable". The Use of Reference Material: An Introductory Manual for Librarianship Students and Assistants was published by Grafton in London in 1937, and Training for Librarianship in the United States was published by the University of London in 1938. Bibliographical Description and Cataloguing was published in octavo in 1939 by Grafton in London. It was reprinted in 1970 as number 341 in the Burt Franklin bibliography and reference series. Matter in the book continued to be of interest in 1972, despite its age.

== Legacy ==
Cowley was commemorated by the Cowley Prize awarded by University College London.
