= Barbara Kyle =

English librarian (1909–1966)

Barbara Ruth Fuessli Kyle (1909, Richmond, Surrey – 1966) was an English librarian and information scientist. She developed the Kyle Classification for social science literature.

In 1965, she edited Focus on Information and Communication, Volume 17, Issue 6 of ASLIB Proceedings. This contained articles by Barbara Wootton (2 papers), A. R. Meetham, W. T. Williams, Rupert Crawshay-Williams, and James Feibleman
