= Cognitive models of information retrieval =

Cognitive models of information retrieval rest on the mix of areas such as cognitive science, human-computer interaction, information retrieval, and library science. They describe the relationship between a person's cognitive model of the information sought and the organization of this information in an information system. These models attempt to understand how a person is searching for information so that the database and the search of this database can be designed in such a way as to best serve the user. Information retrieval may incorporate multiple tasks and cognitive problems, particularly because different people may have different methods for attempting to find this information and expect the information to be in different forms. Cognitive models of information retrieval may be attempts at something as apparently prosaic as improving search results or may be something more complex, such as attempting to create a database which can be queried with natural language search.

== Berrypicking ==
One way of understanding how users search for information has been described by Marcia Bates at the University of California at Los Angeles. Bates argues that "berrypicking" better reflects how users search for information than previous models of information retrieval. This may be because previous models were strictly linear and did not incorporate cognitive questions. For instance, one typical model is of a simple linear match between a query and a document. However, Bates points out that there are simple modifications that can be made to this process. For instance, Salton has argued that user feedback may help improve the search results.

Bates argues that searches are evolving and occur bit by bit. That is to say, a person constantly changes their search terms in response to the results returned from the information retrieval system. Thus, a simple linear model does not capture the nature of information retrieval because the very act of searching causes feedback which causes the user to modify his or her cognitive model of the information being searched for. In addition, information retrieval can be bit by bit. Bates gives a number of examples. For instance, a user may look through footnotes and follow these sources. Or, a user may scan through recent journal articles on the topic. In each case, the user's question may change and thus the search evolves.

== Exploratory search ==
Researchers in the areas of human-computer interaction and cognitive science focus on how people explore for information when interacting with the WWW. This kind of search, sometimes called exploratory search, focuses on how people iteratively refine their search activities and update their internal representations of the search problems. Existing search engines were designed based on traditional library science theories related to retrieval of basic facts and simple information through an interface. However, exploratory information retrieval often involves ill-defined search goals and evolving criteria for evaluation of relevance. The interactions between humans and the information system will therefore involve more cognitive activity, and systems that support exploratory search will therefore need to take into account the cognitive complexities involved during the dynamic information retrieval process.

== Natural language searching ==
Another way in which cognitive models of information may help in information retrieval is with natural language searching. For instance, How Stuff Works imagines a world in which, rather than searching for local movies, reading the reviews, then searching for local Mexican restaurants, and reading their reviews, you will simply type ""I want to see a funny movie and then eat at a good Mexican restaurant. What are my options?" into your browser, and you will receive a useful and relevant response. Although such a thing is not possible today, it represents a holy grail for researchers into cognitive models of information retrieval. The goal is to somehow program information retrieval programs to respond to natural language searches. This would require a fuller understanding of how people structure queries.

== See also ==
- Cognitive model
