= Douglas John Foskett =

English librarian

Douglas John Foskett OBE (27 June 1918 – 7 May 2004) was a British librarian and library and information scientist, and author of several special faceted classification systems.

== Early life and career ==
Foskett was born in London on 27 June 1918. He received his BA from Queen Mary College in 1939 and in 1954 his MA at Birkbeck, University of London. He started his career in the late 1930s as a librarian in the Ilford Public Libraries in Essex. During World War II he served in the Royal Army Medical Corps and later in the Intelligence Corps. From 1948 to 1957 he was Head of Information in the Research Division of the Metal Box Company Limited. In 1957 to 1978 he was at the Library of the Institute of Education in London, where he devised and implemented the specialist London Education Classification scheme to organize the library's collections. The last five years before retirement he was Director at the Central Library Services of the University of London.

In the early 1950s Foskett was among the founding members of the Classification Research Group. He was active member of British Library Association. For 5 years he was a member of UNESCO's International Advisory Committee on Libraries, Documentation and Archives. Also visiting professor in MIT, in Ghana, Ibadan, Brazil and Iceland.

His brother, Tony (1926–2014), was also a librarian and teacher of information science.

== Publications ==
Books, a selection:

- 1952. Assistance to readers in lending libraries
- 1958. Library Classification and the Field of Knowledge
- 1965. How to Find Out: Educational Research
- 1967. Information service in libraries
- 1974. Classification and indexing in the social sciences
- 1974. The London Education Classification (with Joy Foskett)
- 1977. Notes on Compiling Bibliographies: For the Guidance of Students
- 1980. Encyclopedia of Library and Information Science. With A. Kent
- 1983. Reader in Comparative Librarianship
- 1984. Pathways for communication: books and libraries in the information age
