= Von Richter reaction =

Organic chemical reaction

Named after	Victor von Richter
Reaction type	Rearrangement reaction

Identifiers
Organic Chemistry Portal	von-richter-reaction

The von Richter reaction, also named von Richter rearrangement, is a name reaction in the organic chemistry. It is named after Victor von Richter, who discovered this reaction in year 1871. It is the reaction of aromatic nitro compounds with potassium cyanide in aqueous ethanol to give the product of cine substitution (ring substitution resulting in the entering group positioned adjacent to the previous location of the leaving group) by a carboxyl group. Although it is not generally synthetically useful due to the low chemical yield and formation of numerous side products, its mechanism was of considerable interest, eluding chemists for almost 100 years before the currently accepted one was proposed.

== General reaction scheme ==
The reaction below shows the classic example of the conversion of p-bromonitrobenzene into m-bromobenzoic acid.

Übersichtsreaktion der Von-Richter-Reaktion

The reaction is a type of nucleophilic aromatic substitution. Besides the bromo derivative, chlorine- and iodine-substituted nitroarenes, as well as more highly substituted derivatives, could also be used as substrates of this reaction. However, yields are generally poor to moderate, with reported percentage yields ranging from 1% to 50%.

== Reaction mechanism ==
Several reasonable mechanisms were proposed and refuted by mechanistic data before the currently accepted one, shown below, was proposed in 1960 by Rosenblum on the basis of ^{15}N labeling experiments.

First, the cyanide attacks the carbon ortho to the nitro group. This is followed by ring closure via nucleophilic attack on the cyano group, after which the imidate intermediate is rearomatized. Ring opening via nitrogen–oxygen bond cleavage yields an ortho-nitroso benzamide, which recyclizes to form a compound containing a nitrogen–nitrogen bond. Elimination of water produces a cyclic azoketone, which undergoes nucleophilic attack by hydroxide to form a tetrahedral intermediate. This intermediate collapses with the elimination of the azo group to yield an aryldiazene with an ortho carboxylate group, which extrudes nitrogen gas to afford the anionic form of the observed benzoic acid product, presumably through the generation and immediate protonation of an aryl anion intermediate. The product is isolated upon acidic workup.

Subsequent mechanistic studies have shown that the subjection of independently prepared ortho-nitroso benzamide and azoketone intermediates to von Richter reaction conditions afforded the expected product, lending further support to this proposal.
