= Wallisch =

Wallisch is a surname. Notable people with the surname include:

- Erna Wallisch (1922–2008), guard in two Nazi concentration camps
- Jan Wallisch (born 1948), Czech rower
- Koloman Wallisch (1889–1934), socialist labor leader in Austria
- Tom Wallisch (born 1987), American professional freeskier
