= Herbert Marvin Ohlman =

American inventor (1927–2002)

Herbert Marvin Ohlman (1927–2002) is the inventor of permutation indexing, or Permuterm and is one of the pioneers of Information Science and Technology. He has been recognized and included in the Pioneers of Information Science in North America Project.

Permuterm is known as one of the first successful punch card indexing systems, and is still referenced today in the data indexing field. Ohlman published a variety of papers on Permuterm and other Information Science and Technology and communication topics, which are now at the Charles Babbage Institute at The University of Minnesota.

== Permuterm ==
Ohlman first started work on information indexing in 1957 (working for SDC) when he noticed the peek-a-boo (coordinate) indexing system that searched for documents at the Lincoln Laboratory wasted space on most of the cards. Ohlman developed a system using IBM punch cards and tabulating machines that used one punch card for every document title, with significant title words on each card. The cards were sorted and run through a printer to produce the final result. Ohlman named this result a "permutation index" (or Permuterm for short) because the words went through a cyclic permutation process. The first actual permutation index was issued later that year as a subject guide to SAGE programming documents—based on 1,800 documents (2/3 from the Lincoln Laboratory). In 1958 Ohlman submitted a paper titled "Subject-word letter frequencies with applications to superimposed coding" to the International Conference on Scientific Information (ICSI) in Washington, DC. The paper was accepted by the chairman of Section 5, Hans Peter Luhn.

At the conference, Ohlman saw the "perfect way to demonstrate the speed and automation features of permutation indexing to information science and technology colleagues." He presented a mechanically produced index (using IBM punch cards) to conference pre-print papers. For his presentation, entries were selected not just from titles, but also author names and affiliations, headings, captions, sentences, and even phrases selected for their significance as thought units.

== KWIC ==
At the same time, Hans Peter Luhn (working with IBM) distributed his paper titled "Bibliography and index: Literature on information retrieval and machine translation", which contained "titles indexed by Key Words-in-Context system", or KWIC.

While the appearance of the printed indexes were practically identical, Ohlman's index was produced entirely with IBM tabulating machines. Luhn's system used punched cards only for input, converted the data to punched-paper tape, and used a computer to produce the final index.

Ohlman's work may have preceded Luhn's work on KWIC. "Luhn's term for the approach happened to be more "catchy" and stuck but Ohlman's work was just as important, and possibly preceded Luhn's work on KWIC," says Robert V. Williams, Professor and Director of the Office of Research, College of Mass communication and Information Studies at the University of South Carolina.

== Other notable work ==
Ohlman was the founding Chairman of the American Society for Information Science and Technology SIG Education for Information Science (served from 1966–1977) and the Chairman for the ASIS SIG on Information Retention (1967). He also chaired several other SIGs during his career, as well as having numerous papers published on Information Science and communication. He worked for a variety of companies, including:

- Battelle (1955–1957)
- SDC (1957–1960)
- Lockheed (1960–1961)
- IBM (1961–1962)
- Itek (1963–1964)
- Xerox (1964–1967)
- Cemrel (1967–1969)

He was also a consultant in information science and technology for the World Health Organization in Geneva, Switzerland.
