= El Sayed Mahmoud El Sheniti =

Egyptian academic (1920–1995)

El Sayed Mahmoud El Sheniti (1920–1995) was an Egyptian academic and government official who contributed to the development of professional librarianship in Egypt in the latter half of the twentieth century. El Sheniti was born on November 25, 1920, in Egypt. He received his Ph.D. in Library Science from the University of Chicago in 1960. His doctoral dissertation was titled The University Library and the Scholar: A Study of the Recorded Faculty Use of a Large University Library.

"El Sheniti served the Egyptian and international library profession in several capacities. He was Librarian of Alexandria University Library, 1949–51; Assistant Librarian of the UNESCO Fundamental Education Center in Sirs El Layyan, Egypt, 1952–54; Director of the American University in Cairo Library, 1958–63; Unesco Documentation and Publications Expert Stationed at the Unesco Regional Center of Community Development for the Arab States in Sirs El Layyan, Egypt, 1963–68; Under Secretary of State for the Egyptian National Library and Archives, 1968–71; Senior Under Secretary of State for the Ministry of Culture and Chairman of the General Egyptian Book Organization (GEBO), 1971–77; and Deputy Minister of Culture and Chairman of the General Egyptian Book Organization, a post he held until his retirement in December, 1978."

El Sheniti published several books on technical aspects of librarianship in the Arab world. These include: Book Cataloging Rules for Arabic Materials, Authority List of Arabic Names, and Arabic Adaptation of Dewey Decimal Classification.

El Sheniti died on April 8, 1995.
