= Jason Farradane Award =

The Jason Farradane Award is made each year by the UK eInformation Group (UKeiG), a specialist group within the Chartered Institute of Library and Information Professionals. The award is given to an individual or a group of people in recognition of outstanding contribution to the information profession, by meeting one or more of the following criteria:

- raising the profile of the information profession within an organisation or field of endeavour in a way which has become an exemplar to others;
- raising the awareness of the value of information in the workplace;
- demonstrating excellence in education and teaching in information science;
- a major contribution to the theory and practice of information science or information management.

It is an international award open to all.

21st century winners include:

- 2001: Professor Bruce Royan for SCRAN
- 2002: William Hann for FreePint
- 2003: London Metropolitan University and the TUC for the web site "The Union Makes us Strong: TUC History Online"
- 2004: Julia Chandler, for establishing the UK public sector Intranet managers network
- 2005: Michael Koenig, Dean of the College of Information and Computer Science at Long Island University
- 2006: University of Warwick Library for The Learning Grid
- 2007: Caroline Williams and the Intute community network
- 2008–2009: Not awarded
- 2010: Dr. Shawky Salem
- 2011: UK Council for Research Repositories (UKCoRR)
- 2012: The Chemoinformatics Research Group
- 2013: Prof Charles Oppenheim
- 2014: Prof Blaise Cronin and Lucy Tedd
- 2015: Sheila Webber
- 2016: Hazel Hall
- 2017: Christopher Gutteridge of the University of Southampton
- 2018–2019: Not awarded
- 2020: Thomas D. Wilson
- 2021–2022: Not awarded
- 2023: Martin White
- 2024: Karen Blakeman

== About Jason Farradane ==
Jason Farradane graduated in chemistry in 1929 at what is now Imperial College London and started work in industry as a chemist and documentalist. After working in research at the Ministry of Supply and the Admiralty during World War II, he made his first impact with a paper on the scientific approach to documentation at a Royal Society Scientific Information Conference in 1948.

He was instrumental in establishing the Institute of Information Scientists in 1958 and the first academic information science courses in 1963 at what eventually became City University, London and where he became Director of the Centre for Information Science in 1966. Of Central European origin, his commitment to science was reflected in the surname he created for himself – a combination of Faraday and Haldane, two scientists he particularly admired. On the research side his main contributions lay in relational analysis, a precursor to work in the area of artificial intelligence, and the concept of information.
