= Brian Campbell Vickery =

Brian Campbell Vickery (New South Wales, Australia, 11 September 1918 – 17 October 2009) was a British information scientist and classification researcher, and Professor and director at the School of Library, Archive and Information Studies at University College London from 1973 to 1983.

== Biography ==
Vickery was born in New South Wales in Australia, where his father Adam McCay was working as journalist, and his uncle James Whiteside McCay was an Australian general and later politician. Vickery went to schools in Australia, Cairo in Egypt, and Canterbury in England. He received his MA in Chemistry from Oxford University in 1941. He started his career as plant chemist in the explosives factory of the Royal Ordnance in Bridgwater, Somerset in 1941. In 1945 he married Manuletta McMenamin.

After the war he was assistant editor of the Industrial Chemist review in London, England, for one year. In 1946 he started his career as librarian at the Akers Research Laboratories of the Imperial Chemical Industries in Welwyn, Hertfordshire, England, where he worked until 1960. Here he started writing about library science, which resulted in a series of books. In 1960 he became principal scientific officer at the UK National Lending Library for Science and Technology in Boston Spa in Yorkshire, and from 1964 to 1966 he was librarian at the University of Manchester Institute of Science and Technology in Manchester. In 1967 he married Alina Vickery. From 1966 to 1973 he was research director at Aslib in London, and finally from 1973 to 1983 he was professor and director, School of Library, Archive and Information Studies, University College London. After 1983, as professor emeritus of the University of London, he remained active as part-time consultant and kept writing.

== Works ==
Vickery wrote a series of books about library science and related subjects A selection:

- 1953. Recent Trends in Special Libraries, 1953
- 1958. Classification and Indexing in Science, eds. 1958, 1959, 1975
- 1960. Faceted Classification, 1960
- 1960. The National Lending Library for Science and Technology, 1960
- 1961. On Retrieval System Theory, eds. 1961, 1965
- 1966. Faceted Classification Schemes, 1966
- 1970. Techniques of Information Retrieval, 1970
- 1971. Computer Support for Parliamentary Information Service (with H.East), 1971
- 1973. Information Systems, 1973
- 1978. The Use of Online Search in Teaching, 1978
- 1982. Information System Dynamics (with R.G.Heseltine), 1982
- 1987. Information Science in Theory and Practice (with A.Vickery), eds. 1987, 1992, 2004
- 1991. Intelligent Intermediary System: reference functional model, 1991
- 1993. Online Search Interface Design (with A.Vickery), 1993
- 2000. Scientific Communication in History, 2000
- 2004. A Long Search for Information, 2004

== See also ==
- Classification Research Group
