= Robert Saxton Taylor =

American librarian (1918–2009)

Robert Saxton Taylor (June 15, 1918 – January 1, 2009) was an influential library scholar and information scientist who served as Dean of the Syracuse University School of Information Studies from 1972 to 1981. His research and publications focused attention on users of information systems and information services.

== Biography ==
Born in Ithaca, New York, Taylor received a bachelor's degree in history from Cornell University before being drafted into the U.S. Army in 1942. Serving in Germany, he became a member of the Army's Counter Intelligence Corps. As a counter-intelligence officer seeking informants against French and Soviet Communists and former Nazis, he recruited former Gestapo officer Klaus Barbie, the "Butcher of Lyon", later saying that he had not been aware of Barbie's activities during the war at the time that he recruited him.

Taylor recognized Barbie's name, as Barbie had been the only S.S. officer who had escaped arrest in a recent roundup of individuals wanted for questioning. Taylor said Barbie impressed him as "an honest man, both intellectually and personally, absolutely without fear. He is strongly anti-Communist and a Nazi idealist who believes that he and his beliefs were betrayed by the Nazis in power". When the Counter Intelligence Corps headquarters learned that Barbie was being used as an informant and ordered his arrest, Taylor wrote back to request that Barbie be allowed to remain at liberty: "his value as an informant infinitely outweighs any use he may have in prison".

Taylor returned to the United States in 1947, later earning a master's degree in library science from Columbia University (1950). Taylor was named a Fulbright Lecturer in 1956; he went on to work as a librarian, professor, and director of information science at Lehigh University (1956–1967), and then a professor and director of the Library Center at Hampshire College (1967–1972). Taylor joined the faculty of Syracuse University from 1972 to 1983, serving as dean between 1972 and 1981.

At the age of 90, after a lengthy illness, he died on 1 January 2009 at the Francis House in Syracuse. His papers have been deposited in the Special Collections Division of the Syracuse University Library.

== Contributions and recognition ==
In 1963, Taylor argued behavioral sciences provide fundamental approach to information science, as well as logic and mathematics, linguistics, and systems analysis. Taylor suggested breaking these approaches to information science into information sciences and information technology engineering. Information technology engineering would apply to any discussion of the development, design, or operation of information systems, indexing and abstracting services, information services, etc.

Taylor served on the Executive Council of the American Society for Information Science (now ASIST) from 1959 to 1961, and was elected president in 1968. In 1972, Taylor received the ASIS award for the Best Information Science Book, and in 1992 received the organization's Award of Merit .

At Syracuse, Taylor founded the nation's first master's degree in information management in 1980. In 1986 Taylor published Value-Added Processes in Information Systems (Norwood, NJ: Ablex Publishing), where he presents his important user criteria and value-added framework, outlining six categories of value-added services in library and information systems: ease of use; noise reduction; quality; adaptability; time savings; cost savings.

An assessment of Taylor's contributions to the evolution of memory's politics is explored by Nathan Johnson in Architects of Memory.

== Other publications ==
- “Question-Negotiation and Information Seeking in Libraries,” College & Research Libraries (May 1968)
- “Value-Added Processes in the Information Life Cycle,” Journal of the American Society for Information Science (September 1982)
