= Hans Peter Luhn =

American computer scientist

- Born: 1 July 1896; Barmen, German Empire
- Died: 19 August 1964 (aged 68); Armonk, New York, U.S.
- Known for: KWIC
- Scientific career
- Fields: Computer science
- Workplaces: IBM

Hans Peter Luhn (July 1, 1896 – August 19, 1964) was a German-American researcher in the field of computer science and Library & Information Science for IBM.

Awarded over 80 patents, he created one of the earliest practical hash functions in the 1950s, and was creator of the Luhn algorithm, Key Word in Context (KWIC) indexing, and selective dissemination of information (SDI). His inventions have found applications in diverse areas like computer science, the textile industry, linguistics, and information science.

== Early life and education ==
Luhn was born in Barmen, Germany (now part of Wuppertal) on July 1, 1896. After he completed secondary school, Luhn moved to Switzerland to learn the printing trade so he could join the family business. His career in printing was halted by his service as a communications officer in the German Army during World War I.

== Career ==
After the war, Luhn entered the textile field, which eventually led him to the United States, where he invented a thread-counting gauge (the Lunometer) still on the market. From the late 1920s to the early 1940s, during which time he obtained patents for a broad range of inventions, Luhn worked in textiles and as an independent engineering consultant. He joined IBM as a senior research engineer in 1941, and soon became manager of the information retrieval research division.

His introduction to the field of documentation/information science came in 1947 when he was asked to work on a problem brought to IBM by James Perry and Malcolm Dyson that involved searching for chemical compounds recorded in coded form. He came up with a solution for that and other problems using punched cards, but often had to overcome the limitations of the available machines by coming up with new ways of using them. By the dawn of the computer age in the 1950s, software became the means to surmount the limitations inherent in the punched card machines of the past.

Luhn spent greater and greater amounts of time on the problems of information retrieval and storage faced by libraries and documentation centers, and pioneered the use of data processing equipment in resolving these problems. "Luhn was the first, or among the first, to work out many of the basic techniques now commonplace in information science." These techniques included full-text processing; hash codes; Key Word in Context indexing (see also Herbert Marvin Ohlman); auto-indexing; automatic abstracting and the concept of selective dissemination of information (SDI).

Luhn was a pioneer in hash coding. In 1953, he suggested putting information into buckets in order to speed up search. He did not only consider handling numbers more efficiently. He was applying his concepts to text as well. Luhn’s methods were improved by computer scientists decades after his inventions. Today, hashing algorithms are essential for many applications such as textual tools, cloud services, data-intensive research and cryptography among numerous other uses. It is surprising that his name and contributions to information handling are largely forgotten.

Two of Luhn's greatest achievements are the idea for an SDI system and the KWIC method of indexing. Today's SDI systems owe a great deal to a 1958 paper by Luhn, "A Business Intelligence System", which described an "automatic method to provide current awareness services to scientists and engineers" who needed help to cope with the rapid post-war growth of scientific and technical literature. Luhn apparently coined the term business intelligence in that paper.

Luhn received the Award of Merit from the Association for Information Science and Technology in 1964.
