= Phyllis Richmond =

Librarian and historian of science (1921-1997)

Phyllis Allen Richmond (1921 – 6 October 1997) was a historian of science and librarian recognized for her work in classification and cataloging. Her dissertation "Americans and the Germ Theory of Disease" was a leading theory of history of medicine for nearly 40 years and she later published seminal work in classification theory.

== Education and career ==
She studied at Western Reserve University where she received a bachelor's degree in history in 1942. At the Rochester Museum of Arts and Sciences she was curator of history from 1943 to 1945 and 1946 to 1947. She received her master's degree in 1946 from University of Pennsylvania She also studied at Bryn Mawr College and Cornell University.

Her Ph.D. in history and philosophy of science was awarded in 1949 from University of Pennsylvania; her dissertation "Americans and the Germ Theory of Disease" was a leading theory of history of medicine for nearly 40 years. She then worked at the Institute of the History of Medicine at Johns Hopkins University.

Richmond returned to Western Reserve from 1952 to 1956 to study library science. From 1955 to 1969 she worked at the University of Rochester in various aspects of librarianship, including computer-produced title-a-line book catalogs and serials lists, which were "leading edge projects for that time".

She taught library & information science first at Syracuse University in 1969. From 1970 until her retirement in 1984 she was a professor at Case Western Reserve University.

She formed a U.S. Classification Study Research Group, modeled after the British Classification Research Group to which she belonged.

During her career she wrote a book and over 75 research articles. Her work on LCSH was described as seminal.

== Personal life ==
Richmond was born in Boston and grew up in Rochester, NY. Her hobbies included ham radio and cats. In 1997 she died from complications of Alzheimer's disease.

== Awards ==
- Award of Merit from the Association for Information Science and Technology , 1972 - she was the first female recipient.
- Margaret Mann Citation, American Library Association, 1977.

== Selected publications ==
- Richmond, Phyllis A. (October 1954). "American Attitudes toward the Germ Theory of Disease (1860–1880)". Journal of the History of Medicine and Allied Sciences. 9 (4): 428–454. doi:10.1093/jhmas/ix.4.428. PMID 13212029.
- Phyllis Allen Richmond, ‘‘Cats: An Example of Concealed Classification in Subject Headings,’’ Library Resources & Technical Resources, 3 (Spring 1959), 102-112.
- Phyllis A. Richmond, ‘‘Hierarchical Definition,’' American Documentation 11 (1960), 91–96.
- Richmond, Phyllis A. (1966). "Systems Evaluation by Comparison Testing". College and Research Libraries. 27 (1): 23–30, 36.
- Phyllis Allen Richmond, ‘‘Reading list in classification theory,’’ Library resources & technical services. 16(1972):364-82.
- Richmond, Phyllis A. (1988). "Precedent-Setting Contributions to Modern Classification". Journal of Documentation. 44 (3): 242–249.
