= Information scientist =

The term information scientist developed in the latter part of the twentieth century by Wm. Hovey Smith to describe an individual, usually with a relevant subject degree (such as one in Information and Computer Science - CIS) or high level of subject knowledge, providing focused information to scientific and technical research staff in industry. It is a role quite distinct from and complementary to that of a librarian. Developments in end-user searching, together with some convergence between the roles of librarian and information scientist, have led to a diminution in its use in this context, and the term information officer or information professional (information specialist) are also now used.

The term was, and is, also used for an individual carrying out research in information science.

Brian C. Vickery mentions that the Institute of Information Scientists (IIS) was established in London during 1958 and lists the criteria put forward by this institute "Criteria for Information Science" (appendix 1) as well as his own "Areas of study in information science" (appendix 2). The IIS merged with the Library Association in 2002 to form the Chartered Institute of Library and Information Professionals (CILIP).

== Notable information scientists ==
- Marcia Bates
- David Blair (information technologist)
- Samuel C. Bradford
- Michael Buckland
- John M. Carroll
- Blaise Cronin
- Emilia Currás
- Brenda Dervin
- Eugene Garfield
- Paul B. Kantor
- Frederick Wilfrid Lancaster
- Calvin Mooers
- Tefko Saracevic
- Linda C. Smith
- Robert Saxton Taylor
- Brian Campbell Vickery
- Thomas D. Wilson

== Additional reading ==
- Ellis, David and Merete Haugan. (1997) "Modelling the information seeking patterns of engineers and research scientists in an industrial environment" (Journal of Documentation, Volume 53(4): pp. 384–403)
- Poole, Alex H. (2024). "'There's a big difference between going through life with the wind at your back, and going through life leaning into the wind': Feminism in Post-World War II Information Science". Proceedings of the Association for Information Science and Technology. 61: 300–313. doi:10.1002/pra2.1029.
- Vickery, Brian Campbell (1988) "Essays presented to B. C. Vickery" (Journal of Documentation, Volume 44, pp. 199–283).
- Vickery, B. & Vickery, A. (1987) Information Science in theory and practice (London: Bowker-Saur, pp. 361–369)

== See also ==
- Computer scientist
- Documentalist
- Information history
- Information science
- Library and information scientist
- Library scholar
