= Victor von Richter =

German chemist (1841–1891)

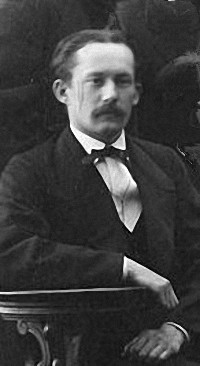
- Victor von Richter
- Born: April 15, 1841
- Died: October 8, 1891 (aged 50)
- Known for: von Richter reaction von Richter cinnoline synthesis

Victor von Richter (April 15, 1841 – October 8, 1891) was a German chemist and discovered the von Richter reaction.

== Works ==
- Chemie der Kohlenstoffverbindungen. Band 1: Die Chemie der Fettkoerper . Cohen, Bonn 1894 Digital edition by the University and State Library Düsseldorf
- Chemie der Kohlenstoffverbindungen. Band 2: Carbocyclische und heterocyclische Verbindungen . Cohen, Bonn 1896 Digital edition by the University and State Library Düsseldorf
- V. v. Richter's Lehrbuch der anorganischen Chemie : mit 90 Holzschnitten u. 1 Spectraltaf. . 8. Aufl. / neu bearb. von H. Klinger Cohen, Bonn 1895 Digital edition by the University and State Library Düsseldorf
- Traité de chimie organique . Vol. 1&2 . éd. française trad. d'après la 11e éd. allemande, Béranger, Paris 1910 Digital edition by the University and State Library Düsseldorf
