= Marcia J. Bates =

American academic

- Born: 1942 (age 83–84)
- Education: Pomona College, University of California, Berkeley
- Known for: Work on information seeking behavior, search strategy, subject access to information, and user-centered design of information systems
- Awards: American Association for the Advancement of Science Fellow, American Society for Information Science Research Award and Award of Merit, American Society for Information Science "Best Journal of ASIS Paper of the Year Award," Frederick G. Kilgour Award.
- Scientific career
- Fields: Information science
- Workplaces: University of California, Los Angeles

Marcia J. Bates (born 1942) is a Professor Emerita of information studies at the UCLA School of Education and Information Studies. She is widely published in the field of information science and focuses much of her research on information retrieval systems and information seeking behavior.

== Career ==
Bates received an MLS in 1967 and a PhD (1972), both from the University of California, Berkeley.

She previously taught at the University of Maryland, College Park and was tenured at the University of Washington in 1981 before joining the faculty at UCLA. Bates has published on information seeking behavior, search strategy, subject access in manual and automated systems, and user-centered design of information retrieval systems. She is an elected Fellow of the American Association for the Advancement of Science, a recipient of the American Society for Information Science Research Award, 1998, Award of Merit, 2005, and has twice received the American Society for Information Science Best Journal of ASIS Paper of the Year Award, in 1980 and 2000. In 2001, she received the Frederick G. Kilgour Award for Research in Library and Information Technology.

Bates' early work dealt with searching success and failure in library catalogs. She initially became known for her articles on information search tactics, that is, techniques and heuristics for improving retrieval success in information systems.

She was editor-in-chief of the 7-volume third edition of the Encyclopedia of Library and Information Sciences (Taylor & Francis, 2010). The encyclopedia covered not only library and information science but also archival science, museum studies, informatics, records management, knowledge management, and bibliography, as well as cognate disciplines, such as communication studies, decision sciences, epistemology, rhetoric, semiotics, and technical writing.

== Research ==
Many of Bates' contributions have been in the area of user-centered information system design. Several of her papers have been widely cited and used, including articles on her concepts of "berrypicking," of "information search tactics," and the "cascade of interactions" in the user-system interface. In 2017, Ali Shiri did an extensive analysis of Bates' major articles, determining who cited her work and why. He found that she had had considerable impact on information system design. Researchers White and McCain included Bates in their list of top 21 prominent information scientists in their 1998 article, as well as a canonical author in the time range of 1972 - 1995.

In conjunction with the Getty Research Institute and other Getty agencies, she has studied humanities information seeking online extensively, producing six articles. In the area of subject access, in 1985, she designed and argued for a "cluster thesaurus" that would bring together all the syntactic and semantic variants of a concept under each concept. Searches could then match on any term in the cluster, with the searcher able to select subsets of terms for further searching. This was also known as the "front-end system mind."

Bates takes an evolutionary approach to the development of human and animal information and knowledge. She argues that "information is the pattern of organization of matter and energy." The recognition and transmission of these patterns has developed evolutionarily, leading to the point where human beings have become able to recognize sophisticated patterns such as language constructions, and patterns of behavior such as "bait and switch". She also defines types of information useful for the information professions, such as "embodied information," "encoded information," "embedded information," "trace information," and "recorded information." which marks a change from the definition of information in communication theory. The communication model sees information as the flow and exchange of a message, originating from one speaker, mind, or source and received by another. According to Ronald Day, "implicit in this standard model of information are such notions as the intentionality of the speaker, the self-evident 'presence' of that intention in his or her words, a set of hearers or users who receive the information and who demonstrate the correctness of that reception in action or use, and the freedom of choice in regards to the speaker's ability to say one thing rather than another, as well as even the receivers freedom of choice to receive one message rather than another in the marketplace of ideas."

Bates claims (drawing on Susantha Goonatilake) that there are three fundamental channels of information: genetic, neural-cultural, and exosomatic.

In response to the rapid transformations in libraries and in information science, Bates has also written on the nature of the information disciplines. The design of the Encyclopedia of Library and Information Sciences Third Edition, that she and Mary Niles Maack edited, also reflects her arguments about the nature of the information disciplines. In 2016, Bates collected forty of her previously published articles and published three volumes called Selected Works of Marcia J. Bates. She discusses this publication in a podcast with The Informed Life titled Marcia Bates on Search Systems, amongst an array of other search system related topics.

According to Google Scholar, Bates' work has been cited over 14,000 times. Cronin & Meho found that she ranked 3rd in a list of 31 influential information scientists. Zhao and Strotmann awarded Bates the ranking of one of the 15 most active and influential authors in the time range of 1996-2005.

== Conflicting opinions ==
Marcia Bates has made many contributions to the field of information sciences, and with this work comes conflicting perspectives from few of her colleagues in the field. Birger Hjørland, a professor of Knowledge Organization at the Royal School of Library and Information Science (RSLIS) in Copenhagen, and a fellow theorist of library and information science, has been one of these critics.

On June 12, 2007, Information: Objective or Subjective/Situational? by Birger Hjørland was published, critiquing Bates' proposed definition of information. Hjørland argues that Bates' concept of information as objective phenomenon does not account for much of the practical work necessary in information science environments. Marcia Bates responds and defends the subjective elements in her perspective in her own article titled Hjørland’s Critique of Bates’ Work on Defining Information,|journal=Journal of the American Society for Information Science and Technology |volume=59 |issue 5 |pages=842-844 |doi=10.1002/asi.20796})</ref> published February 4, 2008. The debate continues on November 4, 2008, when Hjørland publishes an article titled The Controversy Over the Concept of “Information”: A Rejoinder to Professor Bates, as a response to Bates' critiques of his original article. This article elicits another response from Bates in the form of the article Birger Hjørland’s Manichean misconstruction of Marcia Bates’ work, published on August 10, 2011. One final response article is published by Hjørland in October of 2011 titled Theoretical clarity is not “Manicheanism”: A reply to Marcia Bates.

An analysis of this debate between Marcia Bates and Birger Hjørland is presented by Asen O. Ivanov in an paper titled Bridging the Gap: The Concept of Information in the Work of Marcia J. Bates and Birger Hjørland.
