= Hans Wellisch =

American professor, and indexer from Vienna

- Born: Hans Hanan Wellisch; April 25, 1920; Vienna, Austria
- Died: February 6, 2004 (aged 83); Rockville, Maryland, U.S.
- Occupations: Librarian, professor, indexer, bibliographer
- Known for: Indexing; Universal Decimal Classification; script conversion and transliteration

Academic background
- Education: M.L.S. (University of Maryland, 1972); Ph.D. (University of Maryland, 1975)

Hans Hanan Wellisch (April 25, 1920 – February 6, 2004) was a librarian, professor, and indexer known for his work with the International Federation for Documentation (later International Federation for Information and Documentation), contributing to the Universal Decimal Classification. He headed the committee which translated the abridgement of the UDC into Hebrew and was the compiler of the index to the system.

== Early life and Dachau ==
Wellisch had a younger brother, Ellie, and was the son of a newspaper advertising father and secretary turned housewife mother. He was set to graduate after eight years of European high school, which entitled him to enrollment in a university. Even though Wellisch’s academic career was straightforward at this point in his life, he was destined to take a different path. His road to becoming a writer and teacher of classification and cataloging was quite different than many of his other peers within the same field.

After graduating from high school and just a few weeks before receiving his matriculation certification, Wellisch was arrested in November 1938 and sent to Dachau concentration camp. When arrested he already had a visa to Sweden, so he was sent there after two and a half months. There he briefly worked in the special library of the Swedish Cooperative Federation which gave him some training in librarianship. He emigrated to Israel in 1949 where he was the librarian of the Signal Corps of the Israel Defense Forces.

== Career ==
He received a grant from the United Nations to study at the University of Maryland in 1967. The university invited him to join the School of Library Science as a visiting lecturer two years later. He worked there for the rest of his professional career, and earned a Masters in Library Science in 1972 and a Ph.D. in 1975.

Wellisch organized, and edited the Proceedings of the International PRECIS Workshop at the University of Maryland in 1976. His bio-bibliography of first editions of the works of Conrad Gessner was the basis of the Brill microfiche collection, Conrad Gessner: Opera Omnia.

He retired from UMD in 1989 as a full professor.

In 1991 he translated Rudolf Blum's Kallimachos:The Alexandrian Library and the Origins of Bibliography.

He was the first recipient of the American Society for Indexing Award for the index to his book, The Conversion of Scripts: Its Nature, History and Utilization. He also won the Hines Award for "continuous dedicated and exceptional service" to the ASI where he was president from 1984 to 1985.

== Personal life ==
Wellisch was born in Vienna. He was married to Shulamith Wellisch, and the couple had three children Tamar, Ilana and Yuval Wellisch.

== Selected publications ==
- Wellisch, H. H. (1975). Transcription and transliteration: An annotated bibliography on conversion of scripts. Silver Spring, Md: Institute of Modern Languages.
- Wellisch, Hans (Hanan) (June 1975). "Conrad Gessner: a bio-bibliography". Journal of the Society for the Bibliography of Natural History. 7 (2): 151–247.
- Wellisch, H. H. (1976). “Relative Importance of the World’s Major Scripts.” Libri: International Journal of Libraries & Information Services 26 (September): 238–50.
- Wellisch, Hans H. (1977). The PRECIS index system: principles, applications, and prospects : proceedings of the International PRECIS Workshop, October 15–17, 1976. New York: Wilson.
- Wellisch, H. H. (1978). The conversion of scripts, its nature, history, and utilization. New York: Wiley.
- Wellisch. Hans H. (1978). “Script Conversion and Bibliographic Control of Documents in Dissimilar Scripts: Problems and Alternatives.” International Library Review 10 (January): 3–22.
- Wellisch, Hans H. (1980). “Bibliographic Access to Multilingual Collections.” Library Trends 29 (October): 223–44.
- Wellisch, H. H. (1980). Indexing and abstracting: An international bibliography. Santa Barbara, Calif: ABC-Clio.
- Wellisch, Hans H. (Summer 1981). "Ebla: The World's Oldest Library". The Journal of Library History (1974-1987). 16 (3). University of Texas Press: 488–500. ISSN 0275-3650. JSTOR 25541212.
- Wellisch, Hans H. (1983). “ALA Filing Rules: Flowcharts Illustrating Their Application, with a Critique and Suggestions for Improvement.” Journal of the American Society for Information Science 34 (September): 313–30.
- Wellisch, H. H., & Gessner, C. (1984). Conrad Gessner: A bio-bibliography. Zug, Switzerland: IDC.
- Wellisch, Hans, H. (1986). "The Oldest Printed Indexes." The Indexer 15 no 2 October., pp. 1–10.
- Wellisch, Hans H. (1986). The First Arab Bibliography : Fihrist Al-ʻUlum. Occasional Papers / University of Illinois, Graduate School of Library and Information Science: No. 175. Board of Trustees of the University of Illinois.
- Blum, Rudolf, and Hans H. Wellisch. 1991. Kallimachos : The Alexandrian Library and the Origins of Bibliography. Madison, Wis.: University of Wisconsin Press.
- Wellisch, Hans H. (1991). Indexing from A to Z. Bronx, N.Y.: H.W. Wilson.
- Wellisch, Hans H. (1994). “Incunabula Indexes.” Indexer 19 (April): 3–12.
- Wellisch, Hans H. (1998). "Hans H. Wellisch: Cultivating the Garden of Librarianship". Cataloging & Classification Quarterly. 25 (4): 289–304. doi:10.1300/J104v25n04_05. ISSN 0163-9374.
