= Lois Mai Chan =

Taiwanese-American library scientist (1934–2014)

- 麥麟屏
- Born: July 30, 1934; Taiwan
- Died: August 20, 2014 (aged 80); Lexington, Kentucky, U.S.
- Education: National Taiwan University (BA); Florida State University (MA); University of Kentucky (PhD)
- Occupation: Librarian
- Known for: Contributions to the science of library cataloging and library science education
- Spouse: Shung-Kai Chan
- Children: 2

Lois Mai Chan (Chinese: 麥麟屏, July 30, 1934 – August 20, 2014) was a Taiwanese-American library scientist, author, and professor at the University of Kentucky School of Library and Information Science until 2011. Her publications on cataloging, library classification, and subject indexing were recognized with various awards.

== Early life and education ==
Chan was born in Taiwan on July 30, 1934. Her parents were Mai Wuzhi and Tuen-Mok Sau-Ng.

After high school, Chan graduated from National Taiwan University with a B.A. in English. She then moved to the United States and earned an M.A. from Florida State University and her Ph.D. in English literature from the University of Kentucky.

== Career ==
In 1966, Chan began her library career as a serials cataloger at the University of Kentucky. By 1980, Chan was a professor in the library sciences department at University of Kentucky. Chan began publishing books in the late 1970s, beginning with Library of Congress Subject Headings: Principles and Application, a text on the Library of Congress (LC) system of subject headings. She followed with texts on library cataloging, the LC classification scheme, and the Dewey Decimal Classification.

Chan received the American Library Association Margaret Mann Citation for her contributions to the library science profession.

== Awards ==
- 1980 University of Kentucky Alumni Association Great Teaching Award.
- 2006 Beta Phi Mu Award for Distinguished Service to Education in Librarianship.

== Bibliography ==
- Library of Congress Subject Headings: Principles and Application
- Cataloging and Classification: An Introduction
- Immroth's Guide to the Library of Congress Classification
- Dewey Decimal Classification: a Practical Guide

== Personal life ==
Chan was married to Shung-Kai Chan. They had two children, Jennifer and Stephen.

On August 20, 2014, Chan died in Kentucky. She was 80 years old.
