= Pauline Atherton Cochrane =

American librarian (1929–2024)

Pauline Atherton Cochrane (1929 – July 29, 2024) was an American librarian and researcher in the field of library and information sciences. Her research focused on redesigning catalogs and indexes to improve online subject access in library and information services.

== Education ==
Cochrane had a B.A. in social science in 1951 from Illinois College. Her first professional job was as an indexer at the Corn Products Refining Company. She went on to receive an M.A. in library science from Rosary College (now Dominican University). She worked as a reference librarian at the Chicago Public Library and Chicago Teacher's College before going on to pursue a Ph.D. from the University of Chicago. Focusing on classification research she saw her mission "to make Ranganathan's writings more accessible to North American LIS researchers, educators, and students." She was a co-founder of the Classification Research Study Group in the late 1950s, a group devoted to "the intellectual/theoretical development of knowledge organization" based on Ranganathan's Library Research Circle in India and the Classification Research Group in England.

== Professional life ==
In 1960 she was made associate director of the Documentation Research Project at the American Institute of Physics where she worked on A Project for the Development of a Reference Retrieval System for Physicists for the next four years. She differentiated how information retrieval would be performed by physicists as researchers versus physicists as authors using four facets which were in use at the American Institute of Physics until 2009. These facets were:

- property (being studied)
- object (of study)
- method (of inquiry)
- type of research (experimental, theoretical, or both).

Using bibliometrics and automated techniques, Cochrane worked to expand coverage of physics journals in Physics Abstracts.

In 1971 Cochrane became president of ASIS&T. During her tenure ASIS&T began a continuing education program and prepared an international information science directory. She was honored with the Award of Merit in 1990.

She continued in her work to help librarians learn how to use "newer" technology to help patrons find information and created a six part continuing education series for the American Library Association's magazine American Libraries. Entitled Modern Subject Access in the Online Age Cochrane's lessons, co-written with various LIS colleagues, tackled topics such as creating a professional theory of information seeking behavior in users as well as an early awareness of information overload.

== Death ==
Cochrane died in Arthur, Illinois, on July 29, 2024, at the age of 94.

== Publications ==
- A test of the factor-analytically derived automated classification method applied to descriptions of work and search requests of nuclear physicists : report' (1965) by Pauline Atherton and Harold Borko
- Humanization of knowledge in the social sciences (1973) by Pauline A. Cochrane
- Putting knowledge to work an American view of Ranganathan's Five laws of library science (1973) by Pauline A Cochrane and S R Ranganathan
- Interfaces in computer-based bibliographic searching (1976) by Pauline A. Cochrane
- Handbook for information systems and services (1977) by Pauline Atherton
- Books are for use : final report of the subject access project to the Council on Library Resources (1978) by Pauline Atherton
- Librarians and online services (1978) by Pauline Atherton and Roger W. Christian
- Improving LCC and DDC for use in online catalogs and shelflists (1989) by Pauline A. Cochrane
- Visualizing Subject Access for 21st Century Information Resources: Papers Presented at the Clinic on Library Applications of Data Processing (1998) by Pauline A. Cochrane, Eric H. Johnson, and Sandra K. Roe, eds.
