= Linda C. Smith =

Linda C. Smith is professor emerita at the University of Illinois School of Information Sciences. She has served as President of the Association for Information Science and Technology and the Association for Library and Information Science Education. Her scholarship has been wide-ranging and she is particularly known for her research on the potential of information systems to support discovery and consideration of convergence curation. The first librarian to investigate Artificial Intelligence (AI) for Information Retrieval (IR), Smith also specified the role of AI as a human intermediary and identified the AI techniques of pattern recognition, representation, problem-solving, and learning as suitable for IR, claiming AI is just like a human librarian who helps users navigate information systems.

== Education and career ==
Linda C. Smith holds a PhD in information transfer from Syracuse University," MS in information and computer science from the Georgia Institute of Technology, MS in library science from the University of Illinois Urbana-Champaign (UIUC), and BS in physics and mathematics from Allegheny College.

Smith joined the faculty of the School of Information Sciences, the iSchool at the University of Illinois, in 1977. Positions held as assistant professor (1977-1982), associate professor (1983-1994), professor (1994-2019), Distinguished Teacher/Scholar, August 1999- present and professor emerita (2019-present). She has served in several administrative capacities including Interim Dean, Associate Dean for Academic Programs, and Executive Associate Dean.

Smith supervised forty-six PhD dissertations to completion and served on eighty-four doctoral committees.

== Professional associations ==
Smith has served as president of the Association for information Science and Technology, president of the Association for Library and Information Science Education (ALISE), and president of Beta Phi Mu, the international honor society for library & information science.

She served on the American Library Association Committee on Accreditation from 2018 to 2022 and chair in 2021-2022.

== Awards ==
- 2019.Illinois Library Luminary.
- 2010-Award of Merit - Association for Information Science and Technology
- 2008. ALISE Award for Professional Contribution to Library and Information Science Education.
- 2007.University of Illinois. Campus Award for Excellence in Online & Distance Teaching
- 2004. Beta Phi Mu Award
- 2000.Isadore Gilbert Mudge Award--R.R. Bowker Award, Reference & User Services Association, 2000.
- 1998. University of Illinois. Graduate College Excellence in Graduate Student Mentoring Award
- 1993. Fellow, American Association for the Advancement of Science
- 1987. Outstanding Information Science Teacher Award, Association for Information Science and Technology.
- 1973. Medical Library Association. Rittenhouse Award.
- Phi Beta Kappa

== Publications ==
- Smith, Linda C. 1974. "Systematic Searching of Abstracts and Indexes in Interdisciplinary Areas." Journal of the American Society for Information Science 25(6): 343–353, November–December.
- 1976. "Artificial Intelligence in Information Retrieval Systems." Information Processing and Management 12 (3): 189–222.
- "Citation Analysis." Library Trends 30(1): 83–106, Summer 1981.
- 1981. "Representation Issues in Information Retrieval System Design." ACM SIGIR Forum 16 (1): 100–105.
- 1983. "Machine Intelligence vs. Machine-Aided Intelligence in Information Retrieval: A Historical Perspective." In Research and Development in Information Retrieval, Proceedings, Berlin, May 18–20, 1982, 263–74. Berlin: Springer-Verlag.
- and Amy J. Warner. 1984. "A Taxonomy of Representations in Information Retrieval System Design." Journal of Information Science 8 (3): 113–21. https://doi.org/10.1177/016555158400800303.
- 1991. "Memex as an Image of Potentiality Revisited." In: Nyce, J. M.; Kahn, P., eds. From Memex to Hypertext: Vannevar Bush and the Mind's Machine. Boston, MA: Academic Press, 1991, pp. 261–286.
- Bopp, Richard E., and Linda C. Smith. 1991. Reference and Information Services : An Introduction. Englewood, Colo.: Libraries Unlimited. This award-winning book has been published in many editions with several co-editors.
- 1999 "Journal of the American Society for Information Science (JASIS): Past, present and future" In ' 'Journal of the American Society for Information Science' ' 50(11) 965-969. https://doi.org/10.1002/(SICI)1097-4571(1999)50:11%3C965::AID-ASI2%3E3.0.CO;2-2
- 2001 and Sarai Lastra, and Jennifer Robins. "Teaching Online: Changing Models of Teaching and Learning in LEEP." Journal of Education for Library and Information Science 42 (4): 348–63.
- 2008. "From Foundation to Federal Funding: The Impact of Grants on Education for Library and Information Science." Advances in Librarianship 31: 141–165, 2008.
- 2010. "Reference Services." In Encyclopedia of Library and Information Sciences, 3rd ed., edited by Marcia J. Bates and Mary Niles Maack, 4485–91. Boca Raton, FL: CRC Press.
- Smith, L.C. “Who, What and How? Commentary on Chen, F. N. (1963) The Teaching of Reference in American Library Schools, Journal of Education for Librarianship, 3(3), 188-198.” Journal of Education for Library and Information Science 56(1): 50-52, January 2015.
- 2018. "Reference Services." In Encyclopedia of Library and Information Sciences, 4th ed., edited by John D. McDonald and Michael Levine-Clark, 3912–19. Boca Raton, FL: CRC Press.
- 2019. "Artificial Intelligence in Information Retrieval: Forty Years On." In The Human Position in an Artificial World: Creativity, Ethics, and AI in Knowledge Organization, ISKO UK Sixth Biennial Conference Proceedings, London, England, 15–16 July 2019, 301–2. Baden-Baden, Germany: Ergon Verlag.
- 2024. “Reviews and Reviewing: Approaches to Research Synthesis. An Annual Review of Information Science and Technology (ARIST) Paper.” Journal of the Association for Information Science and Technology 75 (3): 245–67. https://doi.org/10.1002/asi.24851
