= Metasystem transition =

Emergence of a higher level of organization or control through evolution

A metasystem transition is the emergence, through evolution, of a higher level of organization or control.

A metasystem is formed by the integration of a number of initially independent components, such as molecules (as theorized for instance by hypercycles), cells, or individuals, and the emergence of a system steering or controlling their interactions. As such, the collective of components becomes a new, goal-directed individual, capable of acting in a coordinated way. This metasystem is more complex, more intelligent, and more flexible in its actions than the initial component systems. Prime examples are the origin of life, the transition from unicellular to multicellular organisms, the emergence of eusociality or symbolic thought.

The concept of metasystem transition was introduced by the cybernetician Valentin Turchin in his 1970 book The Phenomenon of Science, and developed among others by Francis Heylighen in the Principia Cybernetica Project. Another related idea, that systems ("operators") evolve to become more complex by successive closures encapsulating components in a larger whole, is proposed in "the operator theory", developed by Gerard Jagers op Akkerhuis.

Turchin has applied the concept of metasystem transition in the domain of computing, via the notion of metacompilation or supercompilation. A supercompiler is a compiler program that compiles its own code, thus increasing its own efficiency, producing a remarkable speedup in its execution.

== Evolutionary quanta ==
The following is the classical sequence of metasystem transitions in the history of animal evolution according to Turchin, from the origin of animate life to sapient culture:

1. Control of Position = Motion: the animal or agent develops the ability to control its position in space
2. Control of Motion = Irritability: the movement of the agent is no longer given, but a reaction to elementary sensations or stimuli
3. Control of Irritability = Reflex: different elementary sensations and their resulting actions are integrated into a coordinated, but still rigid, reflex-like behavior
4. Control of Reflex = Association: behavioral routines become flexible or adaptive, through the learning of new associations between experienced stimuli and actions
5. Control of Association = Thought: new routines no longer need to be learned through experience; they can be developed by abstract, symbolic reasoning
6. Control of Thought = Culture: symbols and concepts are no longer fixed entities; they adapt through a process of cultural evolution

== Contemporary perspectives ==
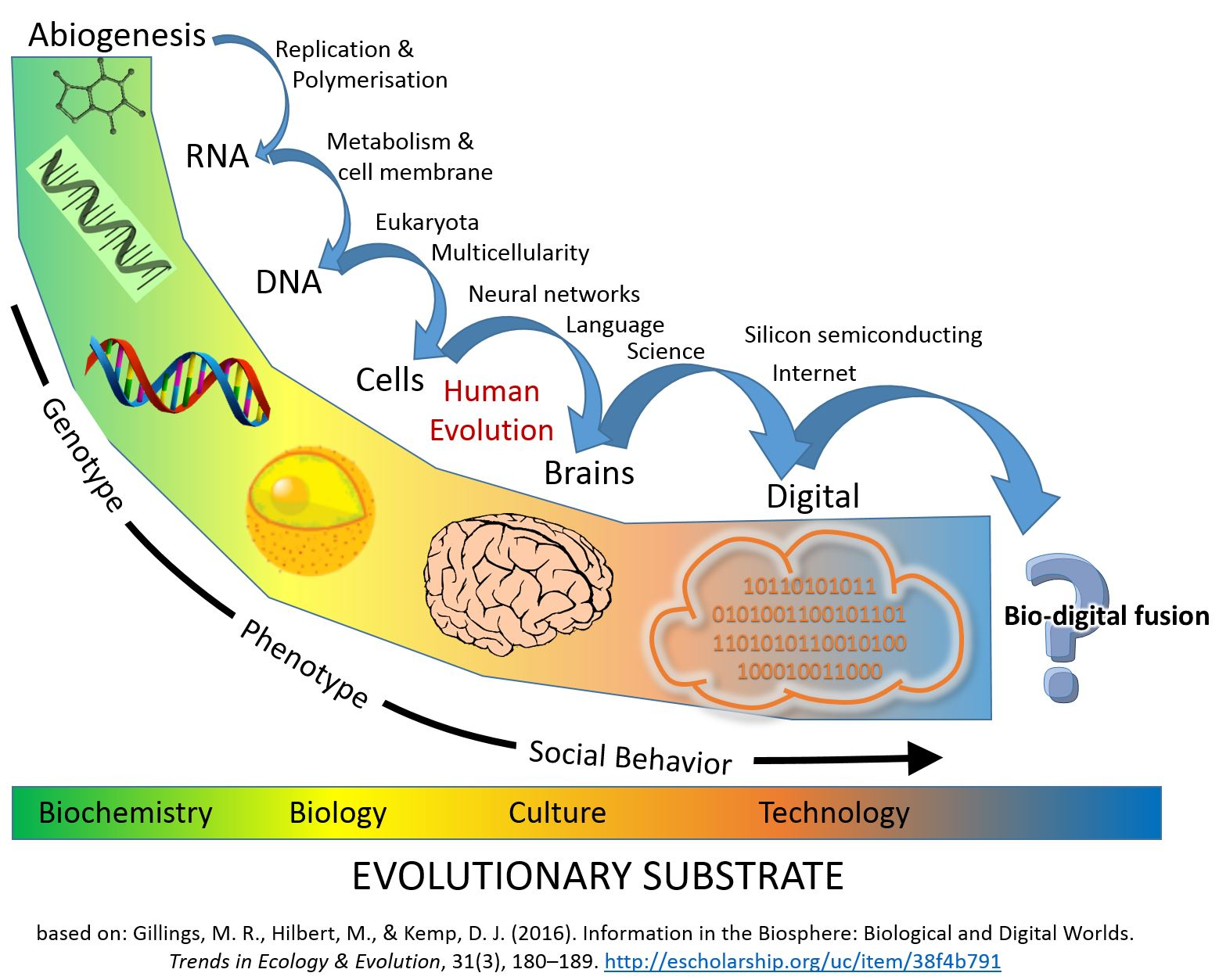
Schematic timeline of information and replicators in the biosphere: major evolutionary transitions in information processing

A number of thinkers have argued that the next human metasystem transition consists of a merger of biological metasystems with technological metasystems, especially information processing technology. Several cumulative major transitions of evolution have transformed life through key innovations in information storage and replication, including RNA, DNA, multicellularity, and also language and culture as inter-human information processing systems. In this sense it can be argued that the carbon-based biosphere has generated a system (human society) capable of creating technology that will result in a comparable evolutionary transition. "Digital information has reached a similar magnitude to information in the biosphere... Like previous evolutionary transitions, the potential symbiosis between biological and digital information will reach a critical point where these codes could compete via natural selection. Alternatively, this fusion could create a higher-level superorganism employing a low-conflict division of labor in performing informational tasks... humans already embrace fusions of biology and technology. We spend most of our waking time communicating through digitally mediated channels, ...most transactions on the stock market are executed by automated trading algorithms, and our electric grids are in the hands of artificial intelligence. With one in three marriages in America beginning online, digital algorithms are also taking a role in human pair bonding and reproduction".

== See also ==
- Francis Heylighen
- Valentin Turchin

== Sources ==
- Valentin Turchin (1977): The Phenomenon of Science. A cybernetic approach to human evolution, (Columbia University Press, New York).
- Francis Heylighen (1995): "(Meta)systems as Constraints on Variation: a classification and natural history of metasystem transitions", World Futures: the Journal of General Evolution 45, p. 59-85.
- Francis Heylighen (2000): "Evolutionary Transitions: how do levels of complexity emerge?", Complexity 6 (1), p. 53–57
- John Maynard Smith & Eörs Szathmáry (1995): The Major Transitions in Evolution, (W.H. Freeman, Oxford)
- Richard Michod (1999): Darwinian Dynamics: Evolutionary Transitions in Fitness and Individuality (Princeton University Press).
- G.A.J.M Jagers op Akkerhuis (2010): "The operator hierarchy: a chain of closures linking matter, life and artificial intelligence".
