= Carlos Gershenson =

Mexican researcher

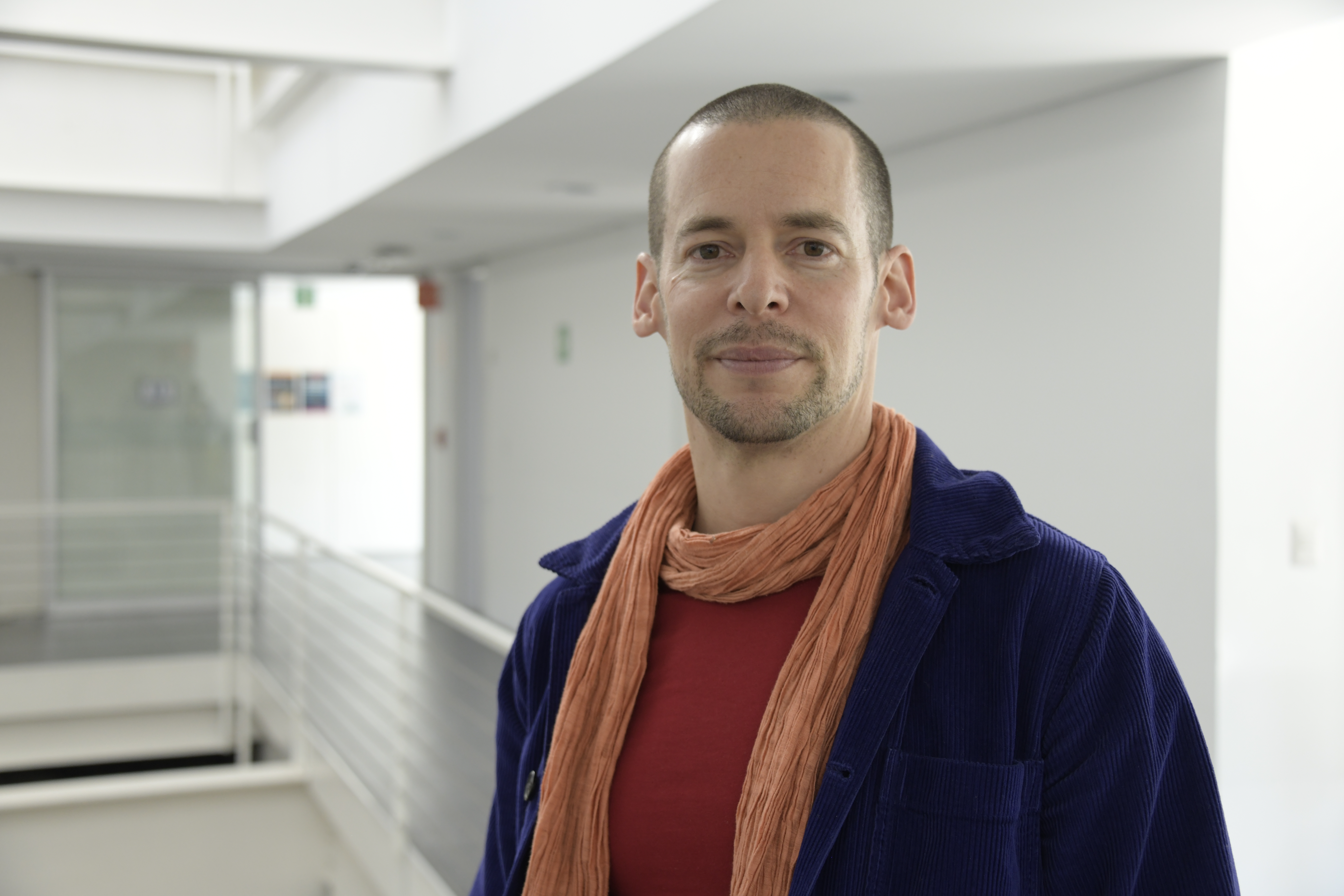
- Born: 29 September 1978 (age 46); Mexico City, Mexico
- Known for: Research on Self-Organization, Complexity Digest
- Awards: Team Mexico City, Audi Urban Future Award 2014, Google Research Award for Latin America 2015 (among other 12 winning teams), Cátedra de Investigación Marcos Moshinsky para Jóvenes Científicos 2017, área de Matemáticas, Reconocimiento Distinción Universidad Nacional para Jóvenes Académicos, en el Área de Investigación en Ciencias Exactas, 2017.
- Scientific career
- Fields: Complex systems, Artificial life, Computer science
- Institutions: Binghamton University, Universidad Nacional Autónoma de México, Free University of Brussels
- Doctoral advisor: Francis Heylighen, Diederik Aerts, Bart D'Hooghe
- Other academic advisors: José Negrete Martínez, Inman Harvey, Yaneer Bar-Yam
- Doctoral students: Luis Enrique Cortés Berrueco, Gustavo Carreón, Jorge Zapotecatl, Dante Pérez Méndez.
- Website: Official website

Carlos Gershenson (born September 29, 1978) is a SUNY Emprire Innovation Professor at Binghamton University and president of the Complex Systems Society (2024–2027). He was a tenured professor at the Universidad Nacional Autónoma de México (UNAM). His academic interests include self-organizing systems, complexity, and artificial life.

== Biography ==
Gershenson was born in Mexico City. He studied a BEng in computer engineering at the Arturo Rosenblueth Foundation in Mexico City in 2001 and a MSc in evolutionary and adaptive systems at the University of Sussex. He received his PhD at the Centrum Leo Apostel of the Vrije Universiteit Brussel, Belgium in 2007, on "Design and Control of Self-organizing Systems", under the supervision of Francis Heylighen. He was a postdoc with Yaneer Bar-Yam at the New England Complex Systems Institute.

He is a SUNY Empire Innovation Professor at the Systems Science and Industrial Engineering Department in Binghamton University. He was a research professor (investigador) at the Computer Science Department of the Instituto de Investigaciones en Matemáticas Applicadas y en Sistemas (IIMAS) at the Universidad Nacional Autónoma de México from 2008 to 2023, where he was the head of the Computer Science Department from 2012 to 2015.

He was also a visiting professor at the Santa Fe Institute, Massachusetts Institute of Technology, and Northeastern University and has also been editor-in-chief of Complexity Digest since 2009. He has been a member of the board of advisers at Scientific American.

== Work and research ==
His work has been related to the understanding and popularization of topics of complex systems, in particular, related to Boolean networks, self-organization and traffic control. He has deployed his systems in the real world to change traffic patterns in Latin America.

=== Self-organizing systems ===
During his PhD, Gershenson proposed heuristics to design and control self-organizing systems. He noticed that self-organization cannot be judged independently of a context, i.e., it is not so relevant to decide whether a system is or not self-organizing, but when is it useful to do so. The usefulness of self-organization lies in the fact that it can provide robust adaptation to changes in a system. As particular cases, he studied the problems of traffic light coordination, organization efficiency, and communication protocols.

He has also explored 'self-organizing traffic lights' and also applied self-organization to public transport regulation and other urban systems. Together with Gustavo Carreón, Tania Pérez, Jorge Zapotecatl, and Luis Pineda, he developed the #Metrevolución project, which managed to coordinate boarding and descent of passengers in the Mexico City metro.

=== Random Boolean networks ===
During his MSc studies, Gershenson proposed a naming convention for random Boolean networks depending on their updating scheme.

He has also studied the effect of redundancy and modularity on random Boolean networks.

=== Conference organization ===
He was co-chair of ALIFE XV, the international Artificial Life conference, held in Cancun, Mexico, in 2016.

Gershenson also co-chaired together with Jose Luis Mateos the Conference on Complex Systems 2017, held for the first time in Latin America in Cancun.
