= Douglas Waples =

American librarian (1893–1978)

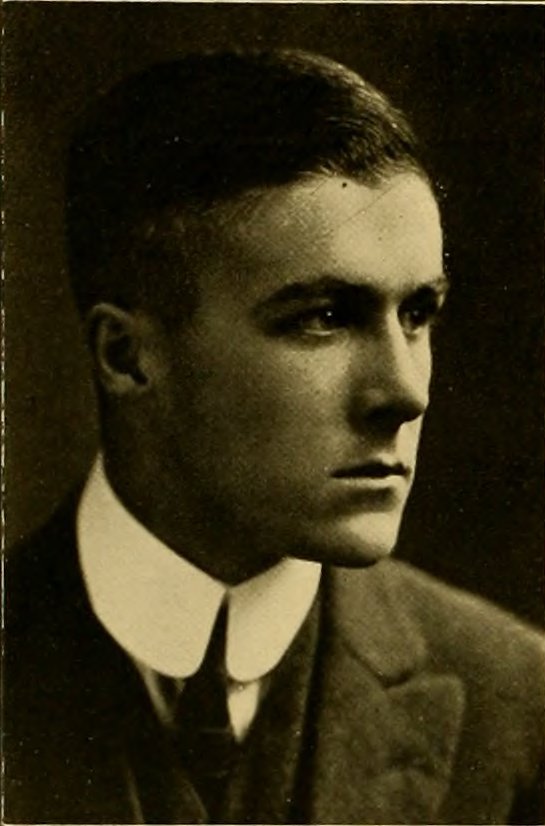
- Born: 1893
- Died: 1978 (aged 84–85)
- Alma mater: Harvard University; Haverford College
- Occupation: Librarian

Douglas Waples (March 3, 1893 – April 25, 1978) was a pioneer of the University of Chicago Graduate Library School in the areas of print communication and reading behavior. Waples authored one of the first books on library research methodology, a work directed at students supervised through correspondence courses. Jesse Shera credits Waples’s scholarly research into the social effects of reading as the foundation for the approaches to the study of knowledge known as social epistemology. In 1999, American Libraries named him one of the "100 Most Important Leaders We Had in the 20th Century".

== Biography ==
Waples was born in Philadelphia, Pennsylvania. Waples earned bachelor's and master's degrees from Haverford College in 1914 and 1915 and a second master's degree from Harvard University in 1917. After marrying Eleanor Jackson Cary and spending a year in France studying educational psychology, Waples returned to earn a doctoral degree from the University of Pennsylvania in 1920. His dissertation was entitled, "An Approach to the Synthetic Study of Interest in Education." The Waples soon added three daughters to their family.

He served as assistant professor at Tufts College near Boston, and in 1923 Waples accepted a demanding tri-part role at the University of Pittsburgh as assistant dean of the graduate school, assistant professor of secondary education, and extension lecturer in a nearby steel mill town. Soon thereafter he followed his mentor, Werrett W. Charters, to the University of Chicago, where he accepted a position in the Education Department.

In 1926 with funds from the Carnegie Foundation, the Graduate School of Librarianship was formed with a mandate from Dean George Works to ponder library methodologies. This program was the first library school in the United States to offer a program of doctoral study. Waples then received an appointment as professor of educational method in this new School. He taught and published and, from 1929 to 1932, he served as acting dean four times. Waples identified six goals for the Graduate Library School: he saw a need to legitimize librarianship as a field for graduate research, to confirm a distinction between evidence and assumptions regarding values and methods of administration, to assure adequate training for aspiring public librarians, to meliorate library school instruction, to identify and systematize professional literature, and to promote scholarly publication.

Waples’s most influential work was People and Print (1937), one of four works published in the Studies in Library Science series. It redirected researchers from assumptions and personal beliefs to compelling investigations and quantitative and qualitative explorations. His revolutionary approach to “why people read; what people read; and how reading affects individuals, social groups, and social institutions” allowed a combination of a humanist’s interest in the betterment of society and the empiricist’s improve understanding of the formation and expansion of knowledge by individuals.

In 1937 Waples participated in the World Congress of Universal Documentation with Herman Fussler and Watson Davis, head of the American delegation.

Another significant consideration for Waples was the social enterprise of libraries. He emphasized scholarship, management, professionalism, organization, and research. Investigating Library Problems (1939), another in the Studies in Library Science series, was a seminal work for the field of library and information studies because it, too, emphasized methodology and integrated quantitative research and introduced consideration of social epistemology. Here Waples went further and proposed that the methodologies and research outcomes were not as significant as the gathering of evidence on which decisions could be based in library environments.

In August 1941 the Graduate Library School of University of Chicago presented a conference on mass communications and American democracy. Waples reported on the 14 papers addressing the issues pertinent just before declaration of war.

In 1942 Waples joined the U.S. and traveled throughout Europe. In 1947 he and Eleanor Waples divorced, and, in the same year, he then married Dorothy Blake. He returned to the University of Chicago in 1948 but departed the Graduate Library School in 1950 to join the interdisciplinary Committee in Communication. In 1957 he retired from his academic post and retired in Washington Island, Wisconsin. In October 1960, a debilitating stroke affected his mobility and speech permanently, and, although he effected a partial recovery, personal communications revealed that his quality of life was affected dramatically. He died in 1978.

== Social Epistemology Foundation ==
A modern view finds libraries as places where information is transferred, where reading materials are supplied to users, and where communities are constructed. Similarly, Waples presented knowledge as interdisciplinary and social in all aspects of his revolutionary perspective of library studies. The most productive era of investigation and writing was in the 1930s, when scholars like Waples interjected social science research methodology. Focus on technical skills was forced to the background, and, with funding from donors like the Carnegie Foundation, advanced research and education in librarianship as well as emphasis on interdisciplinary approaches to other professions and academic disciplines altered scholarly and professional perspective. Increased attention was directed to reading behavior, and the Graduate Library School at the University of Chicago became the hub of the developing interest in the study of reading at the time when the Chicago School of Sociology was developing under the influences of significant philosophers like John Dewey, George Herbert Mead, and Frederic Thrasher.

Those who collaborated with Waples, his peers and his graduate students, helped develop the sociological outlook from which scholars assumed a stance of social scientists and gathered statistics about reading materials and related locations frequented by the public. In 1953 Jesse Shera echoed these sentiments in a published paper: “Librarianship is becoming a cluster of inter-dependent specialisms within a scholarship that is unitary and all persuasive, and that it is supported by a body of professional knowledge.”

== University of Chicago Graduate Library School Records ==
University of Chicago Press records (1892-1965) are held at the University of Chicago Library Special Collections Research Center, including meeting minutes and faculty files, restricted until 2009, and scholarly publications, restricted until 2029. Files on monographs comprise the largest part of the collection. The following Waples publications are included:

Classroom Procedure Test in English Composition (1928), Classroom Procedure Test in Natural Science (1928), Problem Exercises for High-School Teachers (1928), The Commonwealth Teacher-Training Study (1929), What People Want to Read About (1931), The Library (1936), National Libraries and Foreign Scholarship (1936), People and Print (1937), Investigating Library Problems (1939), Libraries and Readers in the State of New York (1939), What Reading Does to People (1940), and Print, Radio, and Film in a Democracy (1942).

Many of Waples’s papers from his tenure at the Graduate Library School were destroyed in a fire in 1961 at his Bel Air, California, home. The remaining papers held outside University of Chicago Library Special Collections Research Center are in the possession of Mrs. Dorothy Waples and the Graduate Library School.

== Sources ==
- Gary, Brett. The Nervous Liberals: Propaganda Anxieties from World War I to the Cold War. New York: Columbia University Press, 1999.
- Guide to the University of Chicago Press Records, 1892–1965
- Israel, Susan E. and E. Jennifer Monaghan, ed. Shaping the Reading Field: The Impact of Early Reading Pioneers, Scientific Research, and Progressive Ideas. Newark, DE: International Reading Association, 2007.
- Osburn, Charles. “Collection Management in the Library Quarterly, 1931–2005,” The Library Quarterly 76, no. 1 (January 2006): 36–57.
- Richardson, John V., Jr. The Gospel of Scholarship: Pierce Butler and a Critique of American Librarianship. Metuchen, NJ: Scarecrow Press, 1992.
- Richardson. The Spirit of Inquiry: The Graduate Library School at Chicago, 1921–51. Chicago: American Library Association, 1982.
- Richardson. “Waples, Douglas (1893–1978),” in Wayne Wiegand, ed. Supplement to the Dictionary of American Library Biography. Libraries Unlimited, 1990.
- Shera, Jesse. “Emergence of a New Institutional Structure for the Dissemination of Specialized Information,” American Documentation (pre 1986) 4, no. 4 (Fall 1953): 163–74.
- Shera. Introduction to Library Science: Basic Elements of Library Service. Littleton, CO: Libraries Unlimited, 1976.
- Waples, Douglas. Investigating Library Problems. Chicago: University of Chicago Press [1939].
- Wiegand, Wayne. "Broadening Our Perspectives,” The Library Quarterly 73, no. 1 (January 2003): v–xi.

== Selected books and articles ==
- Anderson, Harold A. and Douglas Waples. Classroom Procedure Test in English Composition for Rating Methods of Teaching in Junior and Senior High Schools: Form A, Preliminary Edition. Chicago: University of Chicago Press, 1928.
- Anderson and Waples. Directions for Administering Classroom Procedure Test in English Composition: Form A, Preliminary Edition. Chicago: University of Chicago Press, 1928.
- Charters, W. W. The Commonwealth Teacher-Training Study. Directed by W.W. Charters and Douglas Waples. Chicago: University of Chicago Press, 1929.
- Charters, W.W. and Douglas Waples. Check-list of Teachers’ Activities. Reprinted from the Commonwealth Teacher-Training Study, Directed by W.W. Charters and Douglas Waples. Introduction by Samuel P. Capen. Chicago: University of Chicago Press, [1929].
- Charters and Waples. Commonwealth Teacher-Training Study, Directed by W.W. Charters and Douglas Waples. Introduction by Samuel P. Capen. Chicago: University of Chicago Press, [1929].
- Cunningham, Harry A. and Douglas Waples. Classroom Procedure Test in Natural Science for Rating Methods of Teaching in Junior and Senior High Schools: Form A, Preliminary Edition. Chicago: University of Chicago Press, 1928.
- Frazier, Benjamin W. Special Survey Studies, in Nine Parts, by Benjamin W. Frazier, Gilbert L. Betts, Walter J. Greenleaf, Douglas Waples, Ned H. Dearborn, Mabel Carney and Thomas Alexander … United States Department of the Interior, Harold L. Ickes, Secretary, Office of Education, J.W. Studebaker, Commissioner. Washington: U.S. Govt. Print Off., 1935.
- Heckel, Wilhelm Hermann. The Bassoon: (Der Faggot). Translated by Lindesay G. Langwill; revised for American edition by Douglas Waples. Greenfield OH: Music Science Press, [1950].
- Waples, Douglas. American Civil Liberties in the Foreign Press: A Study Conducted Under the Auspices of the Association for Education in Journalism, with Financial Support from the Fund for the Republic. [n.p.], 1957.
- Waples. An Approach to the Synthetic Study of Interest in Education. Balt[im]o[re], 1921.
- Waples. “Communications,” The American Journal of Sociology 47, no. 6 (May 1942): 907–17.
- Waples. “An Extract from a Student’s Examination Paper,” Social Forces 11, no. 3 (March 1933): 367–69.
- Waples. “Indexing the Qualifications of Different Social Groups for an Academic Curriculum,” The School Review 32, no. 7 (September 1924): 537–46.
- Waples. Initial Difficulties in High-School Teaching: An Analysis of Difficulties Reported by Beginning Teachers During Their First Four Months in the Classroom. Chicago, [1925].
- Waples. Introduction to Print, Radio, and Film in a Democracy: Ten Papers on the Administration of Mass Communications in the Public Interest, Read Before the Sixth Annual Institute of the Graduate Library School, the University of Chicago, August 4–9, 1941. Chicago: University of Chicago Press, 1942.
- Waples. Investigating Library Problems. Chicago: University of Chicago Press [1939].
- Waples. Investigations in Teaching: A Manual for Service Studies by Teachers and Supervisors. Ann Arbor, MI: Mimeographed and printed by Edwards Brothers, 1928.
- Waples. The Library. Chicago: University of Chicago Press, 1936.
- Waples. Los problemas de la comunicación pública en el Perú. Lima: Insituto de Relaciones Humanas y de Productividad, Universidad Nacional Mayor de San Marcos, 1959.
- Waples. People and Print: Social Aspects of Reading in the Depression. Chicago: University of Chicago Press, 1938.
- Waples. “Press, Radio and Film in the National Emergency," The Public Opinion Quarterly 5, no. 3 (Autumn 1941): 463–69.
- Waples. Problem Exercises for High-School Teachers: A Series of Classroom Procedure Tests in English, Social Studies, Mathematics Science, and General Method. Chicago: University of Chicago Press, 1928.
- Waples. Problems in Classroom Method: A Manual of Case Analysis for High-School Supervisors and Teachers in Service. New York: Macmillan, 1927.
- Waples. Procedures in High-School Teaching. New York: Macmillan, 1929, c 1924.
- Waples. Procedures in High-School Teaching. New York: Macmillan, 1925.
- Waples. “A Program for the High-School Teachers’ Institute,” The School Review 34, no. 3 (March 1926): 199–211.
- Waples. “Propaganda and Leisure Reading,” The Journal of Higher Education 1, no. 2 (February 1930): 73–77.
- Waples. “Publicity Versus Diplomacy: Notes on the Reporting of the ‘Summit’ Conferences,” The Public Opinion Quarterly 20, no. 1, Special Issue on Studies in Political Communication (Spring 1956): 308–14.
- Waples. Research Memorandum on Social Aspects of Reading in the Depression, by Douglas Waples. Prepared Under the Direction of the Committee on Studies in Social Aspects of the Depression. New York: Social Science Research Council, [1937].
- Waples. “Review [untitled],” The American Journal of Sociology 40, no. 3 (November 1934): 408–09. Reviewed work: Bibliothèques Populaires et Loisirs Ouvriers: Enquete Faite à la Demanded u Bureau International due Travail.
- Waples. “Teachers’ Reading of Non-Fiction,” Educational Research Bulletin 8, no. 17 (November 20, 1929): 377–382.
- Waples, Douglas and Bernard Berelson. Public Communications and Public Opinions [by] Douglas Waples and Bernard Berelson, Graduate Library School, University of Chicago. [Chicago], 1941.
- Waples, Douglas, Bernard Berelson [and] Franklyn R. Bradshaw. What Reading Does to People: A Summary of Evidence on the Social Effects of Reading and a Statement of Problems for Research. Chicago: University of Chicago Press, [1940].
- Waples, Douglas and Leon Carnovsky. Libraries and Readers in the State of New York: The State’s Administration of Public and School Libraries with Reference to the Educational Values of Library Services. Chicago: University of Chicago Press, [1939].
- Waples, Douglas and Harold D. Lasswell. National Libraries and Foreign Scholarship. Chicago: University of Chicago Press, 1936.
- Waples, Douglas and Charles A. Stone. The Teaching Unit, a Type Study. New York: D. Appleton and Co., [1929].
- Waples, Douglas and Ralph W. Tyler. Research Methods and Teachers’ Problems: A Manual for Systematic Studies of Classroom Procedure. New York: Macmillan, 1930.
- Waples and Tyler. What People Want to Read About: A Study of Group Interests and a Survey of Problems in Adult Reading. [Chicago]: American Library Association and University of Chicago Press, [1931].
