= Julien Cain =

French librarian

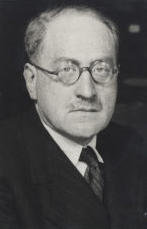
Julien Cain.

Julien Cain (10 May 1887 – 9 October 1974) was the general administrator of the Bibliothèque nationale de France (then called the Bibliothèque nationale) before the Occupation of France by Nazi Germany.

In August 1937, Cain was one of the hosts of the first World Congress of Universal Documentation, held in Paris, which met to further the goal of creating a World Brain, an idea championed by H. G. Wells, and seen by some as one of the precursors to Wikipedia.

In the summer of 1939, before the occupation began, he saw the impending danger clearly enough to order the evacuation of many of the library's most valuable items. Quite soon after the occupation began, Cain was removed from his post by the Vichy government because he was Jewish and replaced by collaborationist Bernard Faÿ. In February 1941, Cain was denounced in Le Matin and arrested. He was detained in French prisons until January 1944, when he was sent to Buchenwald. He was freed by American forces in April 1945, when the camp was liberated. He resumed the administratorship of the Bibliothèque nationale, which he held until 1964.
