= Diane H. Sonnenwald =

Information scientist

Diane H. Sonnenwald is an information scientist and has held the position of Emerita Professor and Emerita Chair at the University College Dublin School of Information and Communication Studies since 2014. Prior to being Emerita Professor, Sonnenwald was Head of School and Head of Subject at the University College Dublin. Sonnenwald's work has focused the inter-disciplinary and inter-organizational collaborations of a variety of agencies, such as in emergency healthcare, in academia, and in industry. Sonnenwald has also been credited with championing the idea of "information horizon", which focuses on how the perceived information options influences one's information behaviors.

== Biography ==
=== Education ===
Sonnenwald received a Bachelor of Science in Mathematics and German from Muhlenberg College in 1976. In 1984, she received her Master's in Computer Science from Montclair State University. Sonnenwald also received her Ph.D. in Communication-Information and Library Studies from Rutgers University in 1993.

=== Career ===
Prior to working in academia, Sonnenwald worked in telecommunications and IT service management as Director at Bell Communications Research (Bellcore), now iconective, from 1985-1993. Upon completing her Ph.D., Sonnenwald was granted a National Science Foundation and NATO Postdoc Fellowship position for the Risø National Laboratory at the Technical University of Denmark. Sonnenwald has held professor positions at the University of North Carolina at Chapel Hill, University of Gothenburg and University of Borås, University of Copenhagen, and at the National Taiwan Normal University prior to her positions at University College Dublin.

== Career achievements and service ==
Sonnenwald served as President of the Association for Information Science & Technology from 2011-2012 and was the first person working outside of North America to be elected to the position. She has also served as chair for the International Relations Committee from 2013-2015 and chaired ASIS&T's 2016 annual meeting. At the ASIS&T's 2016 annual meeting, Sonnenwald was awarded the Watson Davis Award from the organization. In 2017, Sonnenwald was awarded the Distinguished Alumni Award from Muhlenberg College. In 2020 she was the recipient of the ASIS&T Award of Merit, the highest award from the organization based on the criteria of: impact on theory, scholarship, and practice; exemplary leadership and sustained involvement; and education and mentoring.

== Selected publications and presentations ==
- Sonnenwald, D.H. & Wildemuth, B. M. (2001). Investigating information seeking behavior using the concept of information horizons.
  - Winner of the 2001 ALISE Methodology Paper Competition.
- Sonnenwald, D. H. & Soderholm, H. M. (2014). Illuminating collaboration in emergency health care situations: Paramedic-Physician collaboration and 3D telepresence technology. Information Research: An International Electronic Journal, 20(2).
- Sonnenwald, D. H. (2016). Theory development in the information sciences. University of Texas Press.
- Greenberg, J., Sonnenwald, D. H., Hartel, J., Montague, K., & Fourie, I. (2023, October 27–31). Reflecting on two decades of information horizons theory and method: Applications and innovations [Conference Session]. 86th Annual Meeting of the Association for Information Science & Technology, London, United Kingdom.

== See also ==
- Library and information science
- Watson Davis
