= Reginald Arthur Smith =

Reginald Arthur Smith wrote Towards A Living Encyclopedia, which offered suggestions for ways to bear out H. G. Wells's proposal for a "world brain".

== See also ==
- Global brain
- Encyclopedism
