= Global brain =

Futuristic concept of a global interconnected network

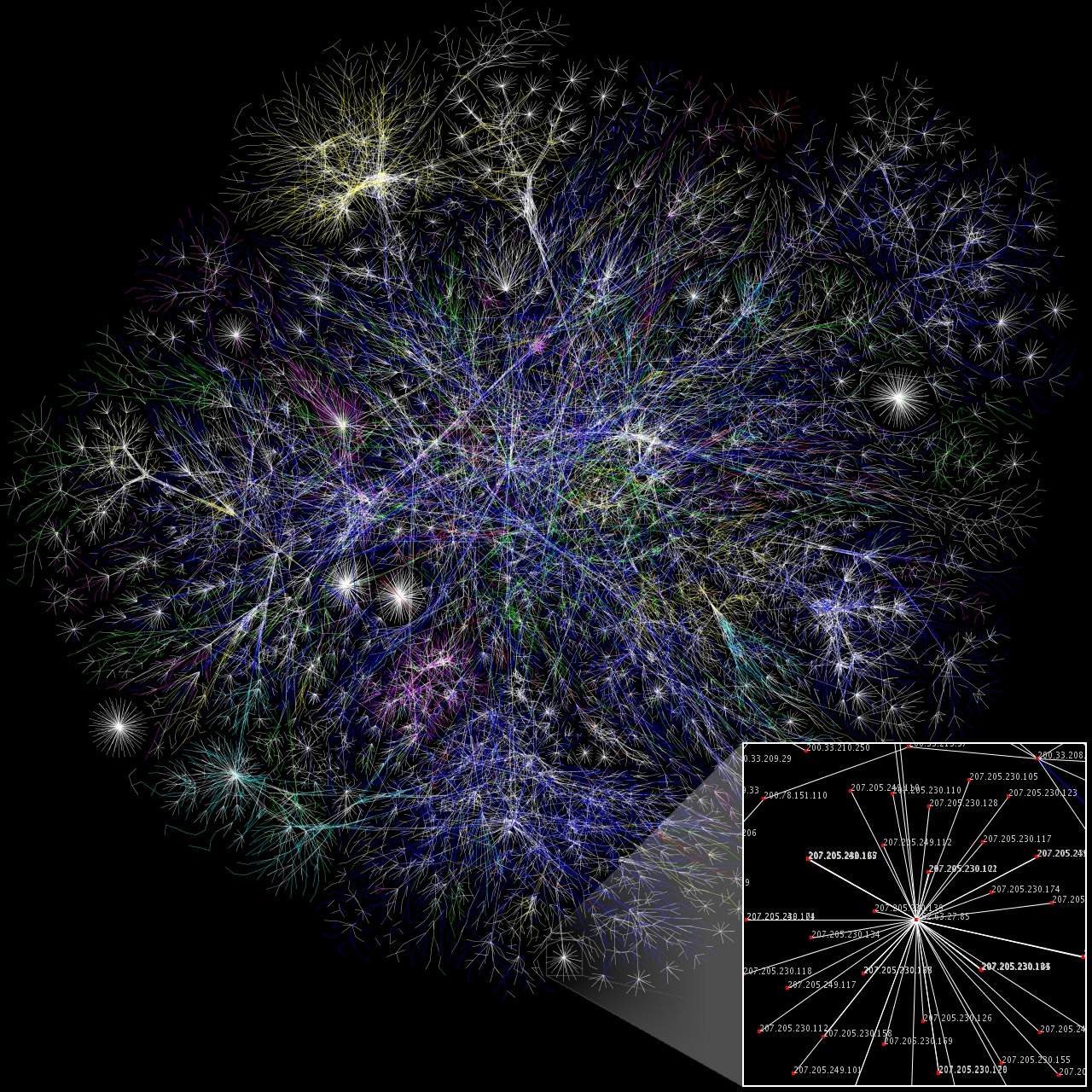
Opte Project visualization of routing paths through a portion of the Internet. The connections and pathways of the internet could be seen as the pathways of neurons and synapses in a global brain.

The global brain is a neuroscience-inspired and futurological vision of the planetary information and communications technology network that interconnects all humans and their technological artifacts. As this network stores ever more information, takes over ever more functions of coordination and communication from traditional organizations, and becomes increasingly intelligent, it increasingly plays the role of a brain for the planet Earth. In the philosophy of mind, global brain finds an analog in Averroes's theory of the unity of the intellect.

== Basic ideas ==
Proponents of the global brain hypothesis claim that the Internet increasingly ties its users together into a single information processing system that functions as part of the collective nervous system of the planet. The intelligence of this network is collective or distributed: it is not centralized or localized in any particular individual, organization or computer system. Therefore, no one can command or control it. Rather, it self-organizes or emerges from the dynamic networks of interactions between its components. This is a property typical of complex adaptive systems.

The World Wide Web in particular resembles the organization of a brain with its web pages (playing a role similar to neurons) connected by hyperlinks (playing a role similar to synapses), together forming an associative network along which information propagates. This analogy becomes stronger with the rise of social media, such as Facebook, where links between personal pages represent relationships in a social network along which information propagates from person to person. Such propagation is similar to the spreading activation that neural networks in the brain use to process information in a parallel, distributed manner.

== History ==
Although some of the underlying ideas were already expressed by Nikola Tesla in the late 19th century and were written about by many others before him, the term "global brain" was coined in 1982 by Peter Russell in his book The Global Brain. How the Internet might be developed to achieve this was set out in 1986. The first peer-reviewed article on the subject was published by Gottfried Mayer-Kress in 1995, while the first algorithms that could turn the world-wide web into a collectively intelligent network were proposed by Francis Heylighen and Johan Bollen in 1996.

Reviewing the strands of intellectual history that contributed to the global brain hypothesis, Francis Heylighen distinguishes four perspectives: organicism, encyclopedism, emergentism and evolutionary cybernetics. He asserts that these developed in relative independence but now are converging in his own scientific re-formulation.

=== Organicism ===
In the 19th century, the sociologist Herbert Spencer saw society as a social organism and reflected about its need for a nervous system. Entomologist William Wheeler developed the concept of the ant colony as a spatially extended organism, and in the 1930s he coined the term superorganism to describe such an entity. This concept was later adopted by thinkers such as Joël de Rosnay in the book Le Cerveau Planétaire (1986) and Gregory Stock in the book Metaman (1993) to describe planetary society as a superorganism.

The mental aspects of such an organic system at the planetary level were perhaps first broadly elaborated by palaeontologist and Jesuit priest Pierre Teilhard de Chardin. In 1945, he described a coming "planetisation" of humanity, which he saw as the next phase of accelerating human "socialisation". Teilhard described both socialization and planetization as irreversible, irresistible processes of macrobiological development culminating in the emergence of a noosphere, or global mind (see Emergentism below).

The more recent living systems theory describes both organisms and social systems in terms of the "critical subsystems" ("organs") they need to contain in order to survive, such as an internal transport system, a resource reserve, and a decision-making system. This theory has inspired several thinkers, including Peter Russell and Francis Heylighen to define the global brain as the network of information processing subsystems for the planetary social system.

=== Encyclopedism ===
In the perspective of encyclopedism, the emphasis is on developing a universal knowledge network. The first systematic attempt to create such an integrated system of the world's knowledge was the 18th century Encyclopédie of Denis Diderot and Jean le Rond d'Alembert. However, by the end of the 19th century, the amount of knowledge had become too large to be published in a single synthetic volume. To tackle this problem, Paul Otlet founded the science of documentation, now called information science. In the 1930s he envisaged a World Wide Web-like system of associations between documents and telecommunication links that would make all the world's knowledge available immediately to anybody. H. G. Wells proposed a similar vision of a collaboratively developed world encyclopedia that would be constantly updated by a global university-like institution. He called this a World Brain, as it would function as a continuously updated memory for the planet, although the image of humanity acting informally as a more organic global brain is a recurring motif in many of his other works.

Tim Berners-Lee, the inventor of the World Wide Web, too, was inspired by the free-associative possibilities of the brain for his invention. The brain can link different kinds of information without any apparent link otherwise; Berners-Lee thought that computers could become much more powerful if they could imitate this functioning, i.e. make links between any arbitrary piece of information. The most powerful implementation of encyclopedism to date is Wikipedia, which integrates the associative powers of the world-wide-web with the collective intelligence of its millions of contributors, approaching the ideal of a global memory. The Semantic web, also first proposed by Berners-Lee, is a system of protocols to make the pieces of knowledge and their links readable by machines, so that they could be used to make automatic inferences, thus providing this brain-like network with some capacity for autonomous "thinking" or reflection.

=== Emergentism ===
This approach focuses on the emergent aspects of the evolution and development of complexity, including the spiritual, psychological, and moral-ethical aspects of the global brain, and is at present the most speculative approach. The global brain is here seen as a natural and emergent process of planetary evolutionary development. Here again Pierre Teilhard de Chardin attempted a synthesis of science, social values, and religion in his The Phenomenon of Man, which argues that the telos (drive, purpose) of universal evolutionary process is the development of greater levels of both complexity and consciousness. Teilhard proposed that if life persists then planetization, as a biological process producing a global brain, would necessarily also produce a global mind, a new level of planetary consciousness and a technologically supported network of thoughts which he called the noosphere. Teilhard's proposed technological layer for the noosphere can be interpreted as an early anticipation of the Internet and the Web.

=== Evolutionary cybernetics ===
Systems theorists and cyberneticians commonly describe the emergence of a higher order system in evolutionary development as a "metasystem transition" (a concept introduced by Valentin Turchin) or a "major evolutionary transition". Such a metasystem consists of a group of subsystems that work together in a coordinated, goal-directed manner. It is as such much more powerful and intelligent than its constituent systems. Francis Heylighen has argued that the global brain is an emerging metasystem with respect to the level of individual human intelligence, and investigated the specific evolutionary mechanisms that promote this transition.

In this scenario, the Internet fulfils the role of the network of "nerves" that interconnect the subsystems and thus coordinates their activity. The cybernetic approach makes it possible to develop mathematical models and simulations of the processes of self-organization through which such coordination and collective intelligence emerges.

== Recent developments ==
In 1994 Kevin Kelly, in his popular book Out of Control, posited the emergence of a "hive mind" from a discussion of cybernetics and evolutionary biology.

In 1996, Francis Heylighen and Ben Goertzel founded the Global Brain group, a discussion forum grouping most of the researchers that had been working on the subject of the global brain to further investigate this phenomenon. The group organized the first international conference on the topic in 2001 at the Vrije Universiteit Brussel.

After a period of relative neglect, the Global Brain idea has recently seen a resurgence in interest, in part due to talks given on the topic by Tim O'Reilly, the Internet forecaster who popularized the term Web 2.0, and Yuri Milner, the social media investor. In January 2012, the Global Brain Institute (GBI) was founded at the Vrije Universiteit Brussel to develop a mathematical theory of the "brainlike" propagation of information across the Internet. In the same year, Thomas W. Malone and collaborators from the MIT Center for Collective Intelligence have started to explore how the global brain could be "programmed" to work more effectively, using mechanisms of collective intelligence. The complexity scientist Dirk Helbing and his NervousNet group have recently started developing a "Planetary Nervous System", which includes a "Global Participatory Platform", as part of the large-scale FuturICT project, thus preparing some of the groundwork for a Global Brain.

In July 2017, Elon Musk founded the company Neuralink, which aims to create a brain-computer interface (BCI) with significantly greater information bandwidth than traditional human interface devices. Musk predicts that artificial intelligence systems will rapidly outpace human abilities in most domains and views them as an existential threat. He believes an advanced BCI would enable human cognition to remain relevant for longer.

== Criticisms ==
A common criticism of the idea that humanity would become directed by a global brain is that this would reduce individual diversity and freedom, and lead to mass surveillance. This criticism is inspired by totalitarian forms of government, as exemplified by George Orwell's character of "Big Brother". It is also inspired by the analogy between collective intelligence or swarm intelligence and insect societies, such as beehives and ant colonies, in which individuals are essentially interchangeable. In a more extreme view, the global brain has been compared with the Borg, a race of collectively thinking cyborgs conceived by the Star Trek science fiction franchise.

Global brain theorists reply that the emergence of distributed intelligence would lead to the exact opposite of this vision. James Surowiecki in his book The Wisdom of Crowds argued that the reason is that effective collective intelligence requires diversity of opinion, decentralization and individual independence.

== See also ==
- Cognitive model § Mother-fetus cognitive model
- Collective consciousness – Shared beliefs and ideas in society
- Collective intelligence – Group intelligence that emerges from collective efforts
- Complex adaptive system – System whose behavior is not automatically predictable from its parts
- Gaia hypothesis – Scientific hypothesis about Earth
- Government by algorithm – Alternative form of government or social ordering
- Knowledge ecosystem – Approach to knowledge management
- Management cybernetics – Application of cybernetics to management and organizations
- Noeme – a combination of a distinct physical brain function and that of an outsourced virtual one
- Noosphere – Philosophical concept of biosphere successor via humankind's rational activities, described by Vladimir Vernadsky and Pierre Teilhard de Chardin
- Singleton (global governance) – Concept in futurology
- Smart city – City using integrated information and communication technology
- Social organism – Model of social interactions
- Superorganism – Group of synergistic organisms
- Technological singularity – Hypothetical event
- Ubiquitous computing – Concept in software engineering and computer science
- World Brain – 1938 collection of essays by H. G. Wells
