= Marta L. Dosa =

Marta Dosa
- Born: May 20, 1923
- Died: January 8, 2015 (aged 91)
- Occupation: Professor of Information Science
- Spouse: Joseph Dosa

Marta Dosa (May 20, 1923 – January 8, 2015) was an information scientist, professor, a doctor in her field, and international liaison between various organizations and countries. Known for her contributions to organizational research and development on an international level, Dosa traveled to many different countries to facilitate good relations and advancements within developing countries to establish connections in methodology for the information sciences. As a result of her efforts, Dosa has received multiple awards. Posthumously, a scholarship has been created under Dosa's husband, Joseph Dosa, and would later extend to Marta after her retirement to fund graduate research in the information science field.

== Education and career ==
Upon immigrating to the United States, Dosa studied at Syracuse University, earning her master’s degree in library science in 1957. Shortly after graduation, Dosa then began her career as a faculty member at Syracuse University, later teaching a variety of disciplines in the information science field. Dosa would maintain this position until her retirement 34 years later. Acting as a liaison between the university and other institutions worldwide, Dosa earned the moniker “international pied piper” by her colleagues. In later years, Dosa would go on to complete her studies at the University of Michigan, earning her Ph. D. in the information science field in 1971. Thereafter receiving her degree, Dosa would continue working her way into an official professor role just a few years later.

Throughout her career, Dosa taught various areas of information science such as environmental information and international information policies amongst others. Furthermore, Dosa would go on to work with many different organizations, travelling abroad to establish policies and maintain relations.

One of these organizations that Dosa became a chair of was the International Federation for Documentation/Education and Training Committee (FID/ET), facilitating international relations and bolstering information standards and policies.

== Awards ==
Marta Dosa wrote many books and articles throughout her lifetime, contributing to the information science field. Of her work, one of her most well-known publications is “Libraries in the Political Scene”. In response to her success in the field, Dosa earned numerous awards throughout her lifetime. Some of the notable awards include: the Post-Standard Woman of Achievement Award (1955), the Outstanding Information Science Teacher Award (1986) from the Association for Information Science and Technology, and the United Methodist Scholar/Teacher of the Year Award (1988).

== Legacy ==
After the passing of Dosa’s husband, Joseph, a scholarship was set up under his name. After serving the university for 34 years, the funding would be extended her name as well after her retirement. This scholarship still exists today at Syracuse University for students within the information science department. Dosa’s legacy lives on through all those she met and instructed, many individuals leaving their accolades and farewells in her online memorial through the university.

== Selected publications ==
- Dosa, Marta L. (1997). Across All Borders: International Information Flows and Applications: Collected Papers. Lanham, MD: Scarecrow Press.
- Dosa, Marta L.; Farid, Mona; Vásárhelyi, Pál; International Federation for Information and Documentation (1989). From Informal Gatekeeper to Information Counselor: Emergence of a New Professional Role. The Hague: Fédération Internationale d’Information et de Documentation (FID).
- Dosa, Marta L. (1985). "Information Transfer as Technical Assistance for Development". Journal of the American Society for Information Science. 36 (3): 146–52.
- Dosa, Marta L. (1985). "Education for New Professional Roles in the Information Society". Education for Information. 3 (3): 203–17.
- Dosa, Marta L. (1980). Conceptual Issues in Environmental Information. Copenhagen: International Federation for Documentation.
- Dosa, Marta L. (1974). Libraries in the Political Scene. Westport, Conn.: Greenwood Press.
