= Lydia Sambaquy =

Brazilian librarian

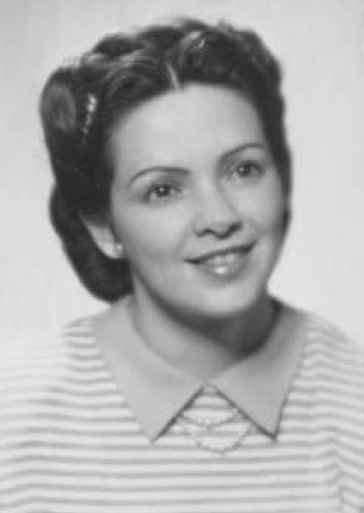
- Born: March 23, 1913
- Died: January 13, 2006 (aged 92); Rio de Janeiro
- Known for: Founder of Brazilian Institute of Information in Science and Technology

Lydia Sambaquy (March 23, 1913 – January 13, 2006) was a Brazilian librarian. She was the founder and president of the Brazilian Institute of Bibliography and Documentation (IBBD), known today as the Brazilian Institute of Information in Science and Technology (IBICT), for eleven years. She was president-elect of the International Documentation Federation from 1959 to 1962.

== Life ==
Sambaquy was born in 1913. Her cousin was Rachel de Queiroz. When she was sixteen she married Julio Furquim Sambaquy who was, in time, a minister for education. In the 1950s she dreamt of having a seven-storey library with a top floor reserved for training librarians – but the finances were never available. She and her sister were working for the Public Service Administrative Department. There she established a foundation course for librarians. Her ambitions began to be fulfilled when UNESCO and Fundação Getúlio Vargas funded her and Jannice Monte-Mor to spend a year visiting libraries to identify their own plans.

Sambaquy was said to have had all the plans necessary for the Brazilian Institute of Bibliography and Documentation (IBBD) and she is credited as the founder. Once the institute was created she became its director and she was to fulfil that role for eleven years. The end of her career was created by a power play under the imposed military regime in Brazil, and Sambaquy left her job.

The IBICT is the branch of the Ministry of Science, Technology and Innovation (MCTI) engaged in prospecting and disseminating scientific information.

Sambaquy died from natural causes at her home on January 13, 2006.
