= Watson Davis =

American scientist (1896–1967)

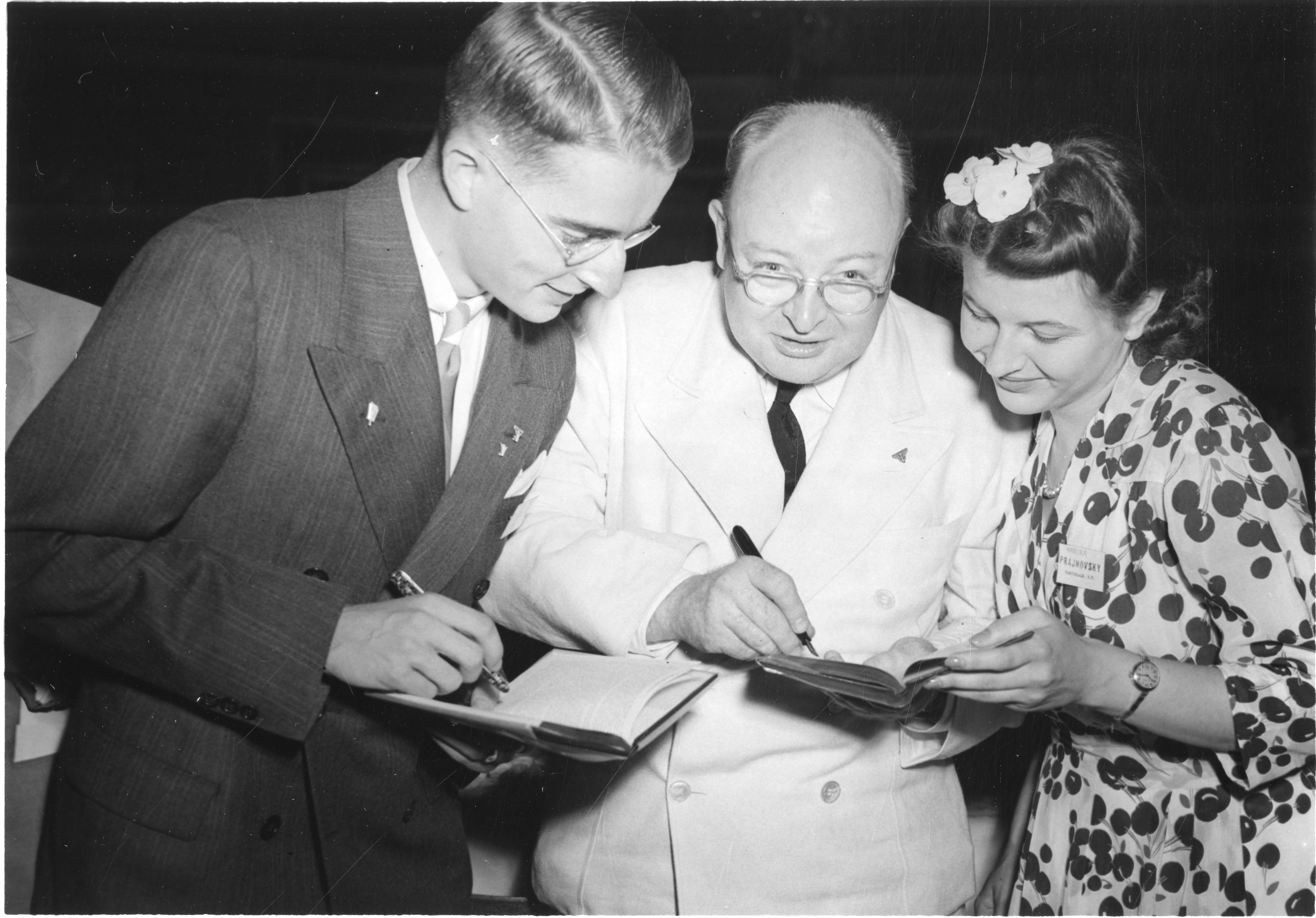
Davis (center) with two young scientists in 1924

Watson Davis (1896–1967) was the founder of the American Documentation Institute (ADI), the forerunner of the Association for Information Science and Technology, and a pioneer in the field of Library and Information Science.

He was editor of Science News Letter, the publication of Science Service, an organization established by the American Association for the Advancement of Science, the National Academy of Sciences, and the National Research Council in 1920. His longstanding interest in attracting young people to science was noted by, among others, President Lyndon B. Johnson; President Johnson said in 1966 that Watson had "awakened the minds and directed the energies of millions of young Americans toward the achievements in research and technology which are increasingly vital to human progress." He founded, in his capacity as Director of Science Service, the Science Clubs of America, reaching at one point roughly a million school-age children across the United States; he also was one of the originators of the Westinghouse Science Talent Search and the International Science Fair.

Nobel Laureate Glenn T. Seaborg, chairman of the Atomic Energy Commission, who eulogized Watson in 1967, noted that "Watson Davis has done more for the popularization of science and the understanding of science by the general public than any other one individual."

In August 1937, Watson chaired the American delegation to the World Congress of Universal Documentation, held in Paris, France. Herman Fussler, from University of Chicago, set up a microphotography lab as an exhibit. At that event, Watson touted microfilm as a powerful means of information interchange: "[Microfilm] will supplement other forms of publication and make accessible material of all sorts that can not now be printed because of economic factors. It will make available out-of-print and rare books. It is adapted to the publication of photographs and other illustrations.... In this way the document is perpetually 'in print' but no extensive, space-consuming stocks need be stored, only the document itself and the microfilm negative from which positives are made for distribution." He also proposed at this conference that newspapers be archived on microfilm, as opposed to being stored as physical copies.

== Education ==
- Bachelors, George Washington University (1918).
- Ph.D. (Honorary), George Washington University (1959).

== Career ==
- 1917: Physicist, Bureau of Standards
- 1920: Editor, Washington Herald (until 1922)
- 1921: Managing Editor, Science Service
- 1922: Editor of Science News-Letter
- 1926: Published "The Story Of Copper"
- 1933: Director, Science Service
- 1934: Under Davis' leadership, Science Service partnered with National Agricultural Library Director Claribel Barnett to create an microfilm-based interlibrary loan program - the Bibliofilm Service – that would distribute microfilm and photocopies of scientific articles on a wide scale to researchers. In an August 5, 1935 letter to Assistant Secretary of Agriculture Paul Appleby, Watson praised Barnett, saying that "under Miss Barnett's direction, this is a successful and pioneer attempt to substitute micrographic reproduction on film for the actual physical loaning of books and periodicals." Davis' ambition was to "create a constantly updated world bibliography of science"
- 1935 (September): Davis participates in the Congress of the International Institute of Documentation (IID) in Copenhagen and becomes familiar with European key issues and personalities in the field of documentation.
- 1936: The first American microfilm symposium, organized by Davis and Robert C. Binkley, a professor at Western Reserve University, is held in Richmond, VA.
- 1937 (March 13): The Documentation Institute is officially established (the word American was added later in April) as a non-profit organization at a meeting held at the National Academy of Sciences building, Washington, DC, by vote of 45 in favor, 5 opposed, and 10 abstaining. Watson Davis was elected president at a meeting held in April. Offices were located at Science Service, where Davis was director.
- 1937 (August): Davis chairs the American delegation to the World Congress of Universal Documentation held in Paris, France.
- 1941: Established science youth division of Science Service, including Science Clubs of America.
- 1947: Watson Davis ends his term as President of ADI, becoming Secretary-Treasurer.
- 1960: Awarded the American Chemical Society's James T. Grady Medal for distinguished reporting of chemical progress for his "outstanding reporting directly to the public, which materially increases the public's knowledge and understanding of chemistry, chemical engineering, and related fields."

== Life ==
Watson Davis was married to Helen Miles Davis. During their marriage, she edited the journal Chemistry of the American Chemical Society. Watson Davis died in Washington, DC on June 27, 1967.
