= Valentin Turchin =

Soviet-American physicist, computer scientist, and human rights activist

Valentin Fyodorovich Turchin
- Валентин Фёдорович Турчин
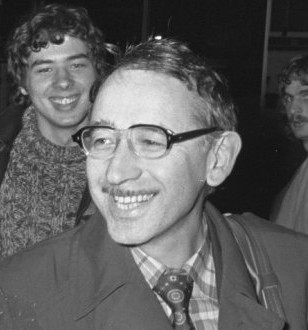
- Turchin in 1977
- Born: February 14, 1931; Podolsk, Russian SFSR, Soviet Union
- Died: April 7, 2010 (aged 79); Oakland, New Jersey, U.S.
- Citizenship: Soviet Union (1931–1977); United States (1977–2010)
- Education: Institute for Theoretical and Experimental Physics
- Known for: Creating Refal, a functional programming language; Founding the Principia Cybernetica Project; Human rights activism with participation in dissident movement in the Soviet Union
- Children: Peter Turchin; Dimitri Turchin
- Scientific career
- Fields: cybernetics, computer science
- Workplaces: Keldysh Institute of Applied Mathematics; Obninsk Institute for Nuclear Power Engineering; City College of New York; subsidiary of Amnesty International in the Soviet Union

Valentin Fyodorovich Turchin (Russian: Валенти́н Фёдорович Турчи́н, 14 February 1931 – 7 April 2010) was a Soviet and American physicist, cybernetician, and computer scientist. He developed the Refal programming language, the theory of metasystem transitions and the notion of supercompilation. He was a pioneer in artificial intelligence and a proponent of the global brain hypothesis.

== Biography ==
Turchin was born in 1931 in Podolsk, Soviet Union. In 1952, he graduated from Moscow University with a degree in Theoretical Physics and got his Ph.D. in 1957. After working on neutron and solid-state physics at the Institute for Physics of Energy in Obninsk, in 1964 he accepted a position at the Keldysh Institute of Applied Mathematics in Moscow. There he worked on statistical regularization methods and authored REFAL, one of the first AI languages and the AI language of choice in the Soviet Union.

In the 1960s, Turchin became politically active. In the Fall of 1968, he wrote the pamphlet The Inertia of Fear, which was quite widely circulated in samizdat, the writing began to be circulated under the title The Inertia of Fear: Socialism and Totalitarianism in Moscow in 1976. Following its publication in the underground press, he lost his research laboratory. In 1970 he authored "The Phenomenon of Science", a grand cybernetic meta-theory of universal evolution, which broadened and deepened the earlier book. By 1973, Turchin had founded the Moscow chapter of Amnesty International with Andrey Tverdokhlebov and was working closely with the well-known physicist and Soviet dissident Andrei Sakharov. In 1974 he lost his position at the Institute and was persecuted by the KGB. Facing almost certain imprisonment, he and his family were forced to emigrate from the Soviet Union in 1977.

He went to New York, where he joined the faculty of the City College of New York in 1979. In 1990, together with Cliff Joslyn and Francis Heylighen, he founded the Principia Cybernetica Project, a worldwide organization devoted to the collaborative development of an evolutionary-cybernetic philosophy. In 1998, he co-founded the software start-up SuperCompilers, LLC. He retired from his post as Professor of Computer Science at City College in 1999. A resident of Oakland, New Jersey, he died there on 7 April 2010.

He had two sons named Peter Turchin (a specialist in population dynamics and the mathematical modeling of historical dynamics) and Dimitri Turchin.

== Work ==
The philosophical core of Turchin's scientific work is the concept of the metasystem transition, which denotes the evolutionary process through which higher levels of control emerge in system structure and function.

Turchin uses this concept to provide a global theory of evolution and a coherent social systems theory, to develop a complete cybernetics philosophical and ethical system, and to build a constructivist foundation for mathematics.

Using the REFAL language he has implemented Supercompiler, a unified method for program transformation and optimization based on a metasystem transition.

== Major publications ==
- Valentin F. Turchin (1977). The Phenomenon of Science. New York: Columbia University Press. ISBN 978-0-231-03983-3.
- Sakharov, Andrei; Turchin, Valentin; Medvedev, Roy (6 June 1970). "The need for democratization". The Saturday Review: 26–27.
- Sakharov, Andrei; Turchin, Valentin; Medvedev, Roy (Summer 1970). "An open letter". Survey: 160–170.
- Valentin F. Turchin (May 1978). "Why you should boycott the Russians". Nature. 273 (5660): 256–257. Bibcode:1978Natur.273..256T. doi:10.1038/273256a0. S2CID 4222713.
- Valentin F. Turchin (September 1978). "Boycotting the Soviet Union". Bulletin of the Atomic Scientists. 34 (7): 7–11. Bibcode:1978BuAtS..34g...7T. doi:10.1080/00963402.1978.11458530.
- Турчин, Валентин (1978). Инерция страха: социализм и тоталитаризм [The inertia of fear: socialism and totalitarianism] (in Russian) (2 ed.). New York: Khronika.
- Turchin, Valentin; Handle, Philip (January 1980). "Boycott Helsinki meeting". Physics Today. 33 (1): 11. Bibcode:1980PhT....33a..11T. doi:10.1063/1.2913894.
- Turchin, Valentin (4 January 1980). "From Helsinki to Hamburg". Science. 207 (4426): 8. Bibcode:1980Sci...207....8T. doi:10.1126/science.6444253. JSTOR 1683174.
- Valentin F. Turchin (1981). The Inertia of Fear and the Scientific Worldview. New York: Columbia University Press. ISBN 978-0-231-04622-0.
- Turchin, Valentin (July 1985). "Orlov in exile". Physics Today. 38 (7): 9. Bibcode:1985PhT....38g...9T. doi:10.1063/1.2814623.
- Valentin F. Turchin (July 1986). "The concept of a supercompiler". ACM Transactions on Programming Languages and Systems. 8 (3): 292–325. doi:10.1145/5956.5957. S2CID 8403840.
- Valentin F. Turchin (March 1987). "A constructive interpretation of the full set theory". Journal of Symbolic Logic. 52 (1): 172–201. doi:10.2307/2273872. JSTOR 2273872. S2CID 2205937.
- Valentin F. Turchin (1993). "On cybernetic epistemology". Systems Research. 10 (1): 1–28. doi:10.1002/sres.3850100102. S2CID 60953576.
- Turchin, Valentin F. (1993). "The Cybernetic Ontology of Action" (PDF). Kybernetes. 22 (2): 10–30. CiteSeerX 10.1.1.359.6176. doi:10.1108/eb005960.
- Turchin, Valentin F. (1995). "A dialogue on metasystem transition" (PDF). World Futures. 45 (1): 5–57. CiteSeerX 10.1.1.214.9001. doi:10.1080/02604027.1995.9972553.
- Refal-5: Programming Guide and Reference Manual, New England Publishing Co. Holyoke MA, 1989
- Principia Cybernetica Web (as editor, together with F. Heylighen and C. Joslyn) (1993–2005)

Most cited publications according to Google Scholar
