= Cliff Joslyn =

American scientist (born 1963)

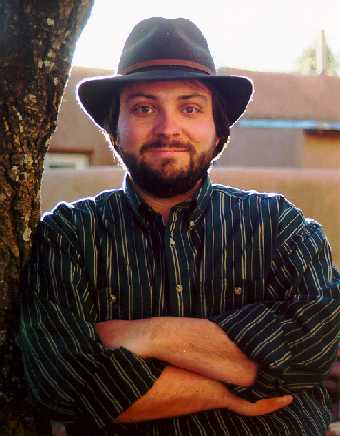
- Joslyn in 2006
- Born: 1963 (age 62–63)
- Education: Oberlin College (1985)
- Occupations: Mathematician; cognitive scientist; cybernetician

Cliff Joslyn (born 1963) is an American mathematician, cognitive scientist, and cybernetician. He is the Chief Knowledge Scientist at the Pacific Northwest National Laboratory in Seattle, and visiting professor of systems science at Binghamton University.

== Biography ==
Cliff Joslyn studied at Oberlin College and received a BA in Cognitive Science and Mathematics, with High Honors in Cybernetics, in 1985. In 1987, he continued at the State University of New York at Binghamton studying under George Klir. In 1989, he received an MS, and in 1994, received a Ph.D, both in systems science, including the thesis "Possibilistic Processes for Complex Systems Modeling".

In 1991, Joslyn was awarded the Sir Geoffrey Vickers' Award for Best Student Paper from the International Society for the Systems Sciences. In 1997 he received the Distinguished Performance Award: A Large Team Award for IRS Fraud Detection Projects, Los Alamos National Laboratory.

From 1994 to 1996, he was an NRC Research Associate at NASA Goddard Space Flight Center. From 1996 to 2007 he was staff member and team leader at the Los Alamos National Laboratory, where he led the Knowledge and Information Systems Science research team in the Modeling, Algorithms and Informatics (CCS-3) Group of the Computer, Computational, and Statistical Sciences Division. Since 2007 he is Chief Scientist for Knowledge Sciences, and from 2021-2023 was the Team Leader for Mathematics of Data Science, at the Pacific Northwest National Laboratory in Seattle, Washington.

In 2022, Joslyn took a position as a visiting professor of Systems Science in the Systems Science and Industrial Engineering department at Binghamton University.

== Work ==
Joslyn's research interests extend from "order theoretical approaches to knowledge discovery and database analysis to include computational semiotics, qualitative modeling, and generalized information theory, with applications in computational biology, infrastructure protection, homeland defense, intelligence analysis, and defense transformation".

=== Principia Cybernetica ===
Principia Cybernetica is an international organization in the field of cybernetics and systems science focused on the collaborative development of a "computer-supported evolutionary-systemic philosophy in the context of the transdisciplinary academic fields of Systems Science and Cybernetics".

The organisation was initiated in 1989 by Joslyn, Valentin Turchin of the City College of New York, and Francis Heylighen from the Vrije Universiteit Brussel in Belgium. These three scientists managed the project and worked together in an editorial board, which manages the collection, selection and development of the material, and the implementation of the computer system.

=== Knowledge and Information Systems Science ===
At Los Alamos Joslyn and his Knowledge and Information Systems Science team performed scientific research in "computational methods for the extraction, representation, organization, synthesis, discovery, and retrieval of knowledge in databases and information systems. They especially emphasize methods for representing semantic information, and hybrid methodologies combining statistical, numerical, and quantitative with symbolic, logical, and qualitative techniques".

A primary application area is computational biology, and thus they had a close working relationship with the Computational Biology and Bioinformatics team. Other application areas include homeland defense, critical infrastructure protection, intelligence analysis, decision support environments, risk and reliability analysis, and defense transformation.

== Publications ==
Joslyn has published numerous papers, articles and book chapters. A selection:

- 1994. Possibilistic Processes for Complex Systems Modeling. PhD Dissertation, SUNY-Binghamton, Systems Science.
- 1995. The Quantum of Evolution: Towards a Theory of Meta-System Transitions. With Francis Heylighen, and Valentin Turchin eds. Gordon and Breach.

== See also ==
- Collective intelligence
- Meta-system
