= Robert C. Binkley =

American historian (1897–1940)

- Born: Robert Cedric Binkley; December 10, 1897; Lititz, Pennsylvania, U.S.
- Died: April 11, 1940 (aged 42); Cleveland, Ohio, U.S.
- Education: Stanford University
- Occupation: Professor of History
- Years active: 1925–1940
- Employer: Western Reserve University
- Organization(s): Joint Committee on Materials for Research; Works Progress Administration

Robert Cedric Binkley (December 10, 1897 – April 11, 1940) was an American historian. As chair of the Joint Committee on Materials for Research of the Social Science Research Council and the American Council of Learned Societies in the 1930s he led several projects in the areas of publication using new near-print technologies, microphotography, copyright and archival management, many under the aegis of the Works Progress Administration. His theoretical writings on amateur scholarship and the ways non-experts could contribute to scholarship have been influential on recent thinking about digital humanities and web publishing.

== Life and work ==
Binkley was born in Lititz, Pennsylvania, of Mennonite ancestry, but his family moved to California when he was still an infant. He attended Stanford University in 1915, and interrupted his studies in 1917 to serve in the USAAS in World War I. After the Armistice he studied for a term at the University of Lyon, and was then hired in July 1919 by Prof. E.D. Adams to gather ephemera published by delegations to the Paris Peace Conference and by wartime societies in Paris and London for the newly formed Hoover War Collection at Stanford. He served as reference librarian in this library while he wrote his Ph.D. dissertation under Ralph Haswell Lutz on the response of European public opinion to Woodrow Wilson, using the materials he had helped to acquire in Europe as well as the Hoover's extensive collection of wartime newspapers. Many of these items were printed on inferior paper and had already begun to deteriorate only a few years after their creation. Binkley therefore became interested in the problem of preserving perishable paper.

After completing his Ph.D. in 1927 Binkley was hired as a lecturer in history at New York University at Washington Square. During his two years there he campaigned for funding for a research program to develop chemical processes to preserve paper, and also to investigate the new possibilities of microphotography. He spent the summer of 1929 in Rome, where he presented a paper and some resolutions on the perishable paper problem at the first IFLA congress.

On his return he took up a position at Smith College replacing Sidney Bradshaw Fay, who had moved to Harvard. A year later he was called to chair the history department at the Women's College at Western Reserve University in Cleveland, filling Henry E. Bourne's place.

Binkley was elected vice-president of the American Documentation Institute at its foundation in April, 1937. His priority for the ADI was to push the limits of copyright by developing a test case for a library copying service. This led to conflict with Davis, and Binkley ultimately resigned in January 1939, frustrated that the ADI had not taken action towards a test case, but still supportive of the institute.

Binkley died in Cleveland of esophageal cancer on April 11, 1940, at the age of 42. He married Frances Williams at Stanford in 1924, and left two sons, Robert W. Binkley and the early music scholar Thomas Binkley. Binkley was posthumously awarded the fifth Pioneer Medal of the National Micrographics Association.

=== Peace Conference History ===
He emerged in the front rank of historians of the Paris Peace Conference in the early 1930s with his articles making use of the first collections of official documents to be published. His interest in publishing collections of documents grew out of his work at Stanford and found its outlet on the editorial board of James T. Shotwell's series The Paris Peace Conference: History and Documents for the Carnegie Endowment.

=== Joint Committee and Documentary Reproduction ===
The combination of expertise in publication and preservation of documents led to his appointment to the Joint Committee on Materials for Research of the Social Science Research Council and the American Council of Learned Societies, as secretary in 1930 and then as chair from 1932 until his death. The purpose of the Joint Committee (which came to be known as the "Binkley committee") was to propose and promote solutions to problems in scholarly communication, including access to primary sources and publication of research results. Under Binkley's leadership the Joint Committee supported ever more innovative uses of new technologies for documentary reproduction, especially microfilm, with which he had been experimenting in his own darkroom with a Leica camera. What Watson Davis was to the promotion of microfilm in the sciences, Binkley was to the social sciences and humanities. He compiled two widely used manuals for the use of the new technologies, in 1931 and 1936. He hired T. R. Schellenberg as executive secretary of the Joint Committee and worked with him on the first large-scale microfilm publication project: the records of the hearings of the Agricultural Adjustment Administration and National Recovery Administration in 1934, comprising 315,000 typescript pages. Binkley and Davis led a symposium on microfilm at the American Library Association conference in Richmond in 1935, which marked the emergence of microfilm into the mainstream of scholarship in the social sciences. The success of meetings such as this led to the establishment of the Journal of Documentary Reproduction, on whose editorial board Binkley served. He proposed putting microfilm at the center of the American entry at the 1937 Paris Exhibition, hoping to show Europe an American information technology "as striking on the intellectual level as the Taylor system of scientific management or the Ford assembly line work in industrial technology".

=== Copyright ===
The reproduction of documents by and for libraries using new technologies naturally involved questions of copyright. The Joint Committee negotiated a "gentlemen's agreement" with the publishers covering what constituted fair use. Although it had no legal standing, the agreement guided library practice for the next 40 years and influenced the Copyright Act of 1976. The agreement (which was actually negotiated by Harry M. Lydenberg for the Joint Committee) fell short of Binkley's hope for coverage of teaching and research uses of materials: he said that it "protects what libraries have done in the past, but not what they might do in the future."

=== WPA ===
The establishment of New Deal relief programs in the 1930s, especially the white-collar program of the WPA, enabled him to apply his ideas on amateur scholarship. He wanted to find ways for university graduates who were not employed in academia to continue to participate in scholarship in their field. The relief programs wanted to employ large numbers of white-collar workers. Binkley seized the opportunity to promote programs to make documentary collections such as archives and newspaper collections accessible to scholars and to amateurs. The Annals of Cleveland project employed 400 workers to write and publish abstracts of newspaper articles from 1818 to 1935 in 44 multigraphed volumes. It was widely copied by WPA projects in other cities. A project to create finding aids for archival collections in Cleveland was the pilot for the Historical Records Survey, for which Binkley did the initial planning and served as a consultant.

== Influence ==
Binkley was given much credit by his contemporaries and collaborators for the development of the use of microfilm and the benefits which it brought to scholarship in and after the 1930s. Eugene Power, founder of University Microfilms International, wrote of him in 1958: "It is on the thinking done during this period and the solutions achieved or attempted, that the whole microfilm industry of today is based. There has been little really original work in this field since those exciting days, and always Binkley was in the forefront: questioning, examining, speculating, and carrying forward everyone around him with his enthusiasm. His death was a profound loss." Vannevar Bush in his work on the Memex may have been directly influenced by Binkley's essay "New Tools for Men of Letters."

More recently, interest in Binkley's ideas has had a resurgence among scholars interested in 21st century technologies of scholarship. It began with Rick Prelinger's interest from the point of view of archives in Binkley's arguments for the democratization of culture and scholarship supported by new information technologies. More generally, Binkley's work has provided a distant mirror to the current rapid changes in the relationship between scholarship and technology. Binkley's insight that has gained the most attention is that the expansion of publication produced by the technologies of mass printing and the specialization of scholarship had served to restrict participation in scholarship to a narrow professional class who had access to major research collections and the means of publishing in runs of 2000 or more copies; but that the new technologies of documentary reproduction, which allowed access to primary sources via cheap copies and publication of short runs or unique copies, could open up participation to non-professionals. Although the technologies of the 1930s did not achieve the revolution he hoped for, those of the Internet age (including Wikipedia itself) seem to be following the path he described.

== Works ==
- 1929: "Do the Records of Science Face Ruin?" Scientific American Jan. 1929 : 28–30.
- 1929: "Ten Years of Peace Conference History." Journal of Modern History 1.4 (1929): 607–629.
- 1929: With Frances Williams Binkley. What Is Right with Marriage: An Outline of Domestic Theory. New York: D. Appleton-Century Co., 1929.
- 1930: Responsible Drinking: A Discreet Inquiry and a Modest Proposal. New York: Vanguard Press, 1930.
- 1931: "The Problem of Perishable Paper." Atti del 1o Congresso Mondiale delle Biblioteche e di Bibliografia. Vol. 4. Roma: Libreria dello stato, 1931. 77–85.
- 1931: Methods of Reproducing Research Materials; a Survey Made for the Joint Committee on Materials for Research of the Social Science Research Council and the American Council of Learned Societies. Ann Arbor: Edwards Brothers, 1931.
- 1931: "New Light on the Paris Peace Conference." Political Science Quarterly 46 (1931): 335–361, 509–547.
- 1934: "New Tools, New Recruits, for Men of Letters." Nov. 1934.
- 1935: Realism and Nationalism, 1852-1871. New York: Harper & Brothers, 1935. The Rise of Modern Europe.
- 1935: "New Tools for Men of Letters." Yale Review n.s. 24 (1935): 519–537.
- 1936: Manual on Methods of Reproducing Research Materials: A Survey Made for the Joint Committee on Materials for Research of the Social Science Research Council and the American Council of Learned Societies. Ann Arbor: Edwards Brothers, 1936.
- 1937: "History for a Democracy." Minnesota History 18.1 (1937): 1–27.
- 1948: Selected Papers of Robert C. Binkley. Ed. Max H. Fisch. Cambridge, Mass.: Harvard University Press, 1948.

== See also ==
- Microfilm
- Works Progress Administration
- Historical Records Survey
- Crowdsourcing
