= World Congress of Universal Documentation =

The World Congress of Universal Documentation was held from 16 to 21 August 1937 in Paris, France. Delegates from 45 countries met to discuss means by which all of the world's information, in print, in manuscript, and in other forms, could be efficiently organized and made accessible.

== The Congress in the history of information science ==
The Congress, held at the Trocadéro under "the auspices" of the Institut International de Bibliographie, was "the apotheosis" of a general movement in the 1930s towards the classification of the growing mass of information and the improvement of access to that information. For the first time in the history of information science, technological means were beginning to catch up with theoretical ends, and the discussions at the conference reflected that fact. Its participation in the Congress was one of the first projects of the American Documentation Institute (ADI). Participants in the conference discussed what has been more recently called "a continuously updated hypertext encyclopedia." Joseph Reagle sees many of the ideas considered at the conference as forerunners of some of the key goals and norms of Wikipedia.

== Microfilm ==
The main resolution adopted by the congress proposed that microfilm be used to make information universally available. Watson Davis, chairman of the American delegation and president of the ADI, stated that the volume of information being produced created difficult problems of access and preservation, but that these could be solved by the use of microfilm. In his address to the Congress, Davis said:

Most immediate and practical to put into operation is the microfilming of material in libraries upon demand. It will become fashionable and economical to send a potential book borrower a little strip of microfilm for his permanent possession instead of the book and then badgering him to return it before he has had a chance to use it effectively. I believe that reading machines for microfilm will become as common as typewriters in studies and laboratories. If the principal libraries and information centers of the world will cooperate in such "bibliofilm services," as they are called, if they exchange orders and have essentially uniform methods, forms for ordering, standard microfilm format and production methods and comparable if not uniform prices, the resources of any library will be placed at the disposal of any scholar or scientist anywhere in the world. All the libraries cooperating will merge into one world library without loss of identity or individuality. The world's documentation will become available to even the most isolated and individualistic scholar.

The Congress included two separate exhibits on microfilm. One was of the equipment used at the Bibliothèque nationale de France and the other, coordinated by Herman H. Fussler of the University of Chicago, consisting of "an entire microfilm laboratory," complete with cameras, a darkroom, and various kinds of reading machines. Emanuel Goldberg presented a paper on an early copying camera he had invented.

Other resolutions passed by the Congress concerned uniform standards for the preparation of articles, for classifying books and other documents, for indexing newspapers and periodicals, and for cooperation between libraries.

== H. G. Wells ==
In his address to the Congress, H. G. Wells said that he thought that his idea of the "world brain" was a precursor to the ideas other delegates were proposing, and explicitly linked the projects being discussed to the work of the encyclopédistes:

I am speaking of a process of mental organization throughout the world which I believe to be as inevitable as anything can be in human affairs. All the distresses and horrors of the present time are fundamentally intellectual. The world has to pull its mind together, and this [Congress] is the beginning of its efforts. Civilization is a Phoenix. It perishes in flames and even as it dies it is born again. This synthesis of knowledge upon which you are working is the necessary beginning of a new world.

It is good to be meeting here in Paris where the first encyclopedia of power was made. It would be impossible to overrate our debt to Diderot and his associates.

== Other participants ==
Participants in the Congress included authors, librarians, scholars, archivists, scientists, and editors. Some of the notable people in attendance not mentioned above were:

- Suzanne Briet
- Julien Cain
- Henri La Fontaine
- Worthington C. Ford
- Herman H. Fussler
- Hilary Jenkinson
- Paul Otlet
- Atherton Seidell
- Douglas Waples

== See also ==
- Congress
- Documentation science
- Information science
- International Encyclopedia of Unified Science § International Congresses for the Unity of Science – The Third International Congress for the Unity of Science was held in Paris a few weeks before the World Congress of Universal Documentation
