= Principia Cybernetica =

International cooperation of scientists

Principia Cybernetica is an international cooperation of scientists in the field of cybernetics and systems science, especially known for their website, Principia Cybernetica. They have dedicated their organization to what they call "a computer-supported evolutionary-systemic philosophy, in the context of the transdisciplinary academic fields of Systems Science and Cybernetics".

== Organisation ==
Principia Cybernetica was initiated in 1989 in the USA by Cliff Joslyn and Valentin Turchin, and a year later broadened to Europe with Francis Heylighen from Belgium joining their cooperation.

Major activities of the Principia Cybernetica Project are:

- Principia Cybernetica Web: an online encyclopedia
- Web Dictionary of Cybernetics and Systems; an online dictionary
- Newsletter Principia Cybernetica News
- Conferences and traditional publications

The organization is associated with:

- American Society for Cybernetics.
- Evolution, Complexity and Cognition group: a transdisciplinary research group at the Free University of Brussels, Belgium, founded in 2004 and directed by Francis Heylighen.
- Journal of Memetics-Evolutionary Models of Information Transmission (JoM-EMIT) is an international peer-refereed scientific journal
- Global Brain Group: for discussion about the emergence of a global brain.

== Principia Cybernetica Web ==
The Principia Cybernetica Web, which went online in 1993, is one of the first complex webs in the world. It contains content on cybernetics, systems theory, complexity, and related approaches.

== Workshops and symposia ==
Especially in the 1990s the Principia Cybernetica has organized a series of workshops and international symposia on cybernetic themes. On the 1st Principia Cybernetica Workshop in June 1991 in Brussels many cyberneticists attended like Harry Bronitz, Gordon Pask, J.L. Elohim, Robert Glueck, Ranulph Glanville, Annemie Van Kerkhoven, Don McNeil, Elan Moritz, Cliff Joslyn, A. Comhaire and Valentin Turchin.

== See also ==
- W. Ross Ashby
- Complex adaptive system
- Evolutionary epistemology
- Global brain
- Manifest and latent functions and dysfunctions
- Red Queen
- Stuart Umpleby
- Emergence
