= World Brain =

1938 collection of essays by H. G. Wells

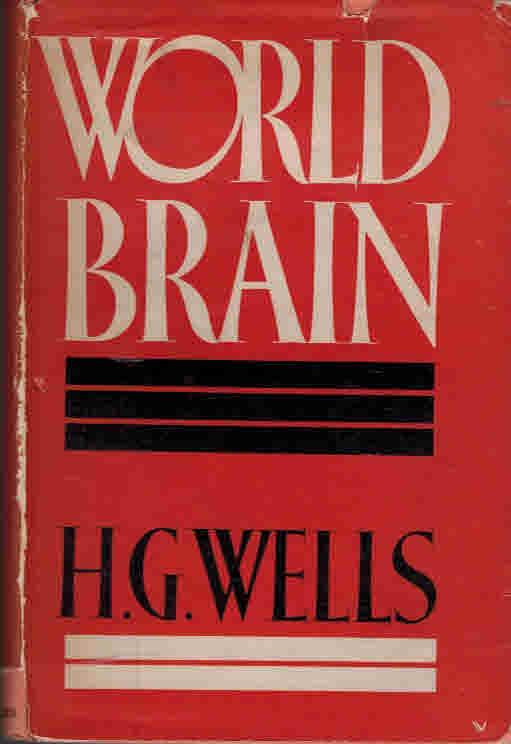
- First edition cover
- Author: H. G. Wells
- Publisher: Methuen Publishing
- Publication date: 1938

World Brain is a collection of essays and addresses by the English science fiction pioneer, social reformer, evolutionary biologist and historian H. G. Wells, dating from the period of 1936–1938. Throughout the book, Wells describes his vision of the World Brain: a new, free, synthetic, authoritative, permanent "World Encyclopaedia" that could help world citizens make the best use of universal information resources and make the best contribution to world peace.

== Background ==
Plans for creating a global knowledge network long predate Wells. Andrew Michael Ramsay described, c. 1737, an objective of freemasonry as follows:

... to furnish the materials for a Universal Dictionary ... By this means the lights of all nations will be united in one single work, which will be a universal library of all that is beautiful, great, luminous, solid, and useful in all the sciences and in all noble arts. This work will augment in each century, according to the increase of knowledge.

The Encyclopedist movement in France in the mid-eighteenth century was a major attempt to actualize this philosophy. However, efforts to encompass all knowledge came to seem less possible as the available corpus expanded exponentially.

In 1926, extending the analogy between global telegraphy and the nervous system, Nikola Tesla speculated that:

When wireless is perfectly applied the whole earth will be converted into a huge brain ... Not only this, but through television and telephony we shall see and hear one another as perfectly as though we were face to face, despite intervening distances of thousands of miles; and the instruments through which we shall be able to do this will be amazingly simple compared with our present telephone. A man will be able to carry one in his vest pocket.

Paul Otlet, a contemporary of Wells and information science pioneer, revived this movement in the twentieth century. Otlet wrote in 1935, "Man would no longer need documentation if he were assimilated into a being that has become omniscient, in the manner of God himself." Otlet, like Wells, supported the internationalist efforts of the League of Nations and its International Institute of Intellectual Cooperation.

For his part, Wells had advocated world government for at least a decade, arguing in such books as The Open Conspiracy for control of education by a scientific elite.

== Synopsis ==
In the wake of the first World War, Wells believed that people needed to become more educated and conversant with events and knowledge that surrounded them. In order to do this he offered the idea of the knowledge system of the World Brain that all humans could access.

=== World Encyclopedia ===
This section, Wells's first expression of his dream of a World Brain, was delivered as a lecture at the Royal Institution of Great Britain, Weekly Evening Meeting, Friday, 20 November 1936.

Wells begins the lecture with a statement on his preference for cohesive worldviews rather than isolated facts. Correspondingly, he wishes the world to be such a whole "as coherent and consistent as possible". He mentions The Work, Wealth and Happiness of Mankind (1931), one of his own attempts at providing intellectual synthesis, and calls it disappointingly unmatched.

He expresses dismay at the ignorance of social science among the Treaty of Versailles and League of Nations framers. He mentions some recent works on the role of science in society and states his main problem as follows:

We want the intellectual worker to become a more definitely organised factor in the human scheme. How is that factor to be organised? Is there any way of implementing knowledge for ready and universal effect?

In answer he introduces the doctrine of New Encyclopaedism as a framework for integrating intellectuals into an organic whole. For the ordinary man, who will necessarily be an educated citizen in the modern state:

From his point of view the World Encyclopaedia would be a row of volumes in his own home or in some neighbouring house or in a convenient public library or in any school or college, and in this row of volumes he would, without any great toil or difficulty, find in clear understandable language, and kept up to date, the ruling concepts of our social order, the outlines and main particulars in all fields of knowledge, an exact and reasonably detailed picture of our universe, a general history of the world, and if by any chance he wanted to pursue a question into its ultimate detail, a trustworthy and complete system of reference to primary sources of knowledge. In fields where wide varieties of method and opinion existed, he would find, not casual summaries of opinions, but very carefully chosen and correlated statements and arguments. [...] This World Encyclopaedia would be the mental background of every intelligent man in the world. It would be alive and growing and changing continually under revision, extension and replacement from the original thinkers in the world everywhere. Every university and research institution should be feeding it. Every fresh mind should be brought into contact with its standing editorial organisation. And on the other hand its contents would be the standard source of material for the instructional side of school and college work, for the verification of facts and the testing of statements—everywhere in the world. Even journalists would deign to use it; even newspaper proprietors might be made to respect it.

Such an encyclopedia would be akin to a secular bible. Universal acceptance would be possible due to the underlying similarity of human brains. For specialists and intellectuals, the World Encyclopedia will provide valuable coordination with other intellectuals working in similar areas.

Wells calls for the formation of an Encyclopaedia Society to promote the project and defend it from exploitation (e.g. by an "enterprising publisher" trying to profit from it). This society would also organize departments for production. Of course, the existence of a society has its own risks:

And there will be a constant danger that some of the early promoters may feel and attempt to realise a sort of proprietorship in the organisation, to make a group or a gang of it. But to recognise that danger is half-way to averting it.

The language of the World Encyclopedia would be English because of its greater range, precision, and subtlety.

Intellectual workers across the world would be increasingly bound together through their participation.

Wells wishes that wise world citizens would ensure world peace. He suggests that a world intellectual project will have more positive impact to this end than will any political movement such as communism, fascism, imperialism, pacifism, etc.

He ended his lecture as follows:

[W]hat I am saying ... is this, that without a World Encyclopaedia to hold men's minds together in something like a common interpretation of reality, there is no hope whatever of anything but an accidental and transitory alleviation of any of our world troubles.

=== The Brain Organization of the Modern World ===
This section was first delivered as a lecture in America, October and November 1937.

This lecture promotes the doctrine New Encyclopedism described previously. Wells begins with the observation that the world has become a single interconnected community due to the enormously increased speed of telecommunications. Secondly, he says that energy is available on a new scale, enabling, among other things, the capability for mass destruction. Consequently, the establishment of a new world order is imperative:

One needs an exceptional stupidity even to question the urgency we are under to establish some effective World Pax, before gathering disaster overwhelms us. The problem of reshaping human affairs on a world-scale, this World problem, is drawing together an ever-increasing multitude of minds.

Neither Christianity nor socialism can solve the World Problem. The solution is a modernized "World Knowledge Apparatus"—the World Encyclopedia—"a sort of mental clearing house for the mind, a depot where knowledge and ideas are received, sorted, summarized, digested, clarified and compared". Wells thought that technological advances such as microfilm could be used towards this end so that "any student, in any part of the world, will be able to sit with his projector in his own study at his or her convenience to examine any book, any document, in an exact replica".

In this lecture Wells develops the analogy of the encyclopedia to a brain, saying, "it would be a clearing house for universities and research institutions; it would play the role of a cerebral cortex to these essential ganglia".

He mentions the International Committee on Intellectual Cooperation, an advisory branch of the League of Nations, and the 1937 World Congress of Universal Documentation as contemporary forerunners of the world brain.

=== A Permanent World Encyclopedia ===
This section was first published in Harper's Magazine, April 1937, and contributed to the new Encyclopédie française, August 1937.

In this essay, Wells explains how current encyclopaedias have failed to adapt to both the growing increase in recorded knowledge and the expansion of people requiring information that was accurate and readily accessible. He asserts that these 19th-century encyclopaedias continue to follow the 18th-century pattern, organisation and scale. "Our contemporary encyclopedias are still in the coach-and-horse phase of development," he argued, "rather than in the phase of the automobile and the aeroplane".

Wells saw the potential for world-altering impacts this technology could bring. He felt that the creation of the encyclopaedia could bring about the peaceful days of the past, "with a common understanding and the conception of a common purpose, and of a commonwealth such as now we hardly dream of".

Wells anticipated the effect and contribution that his World Brain would have on the university system as well. He wanted to see universities contributing to it, helping it grow, and feeding its search for holistic information. "Every university and research institution should be feeding it" (p. 14). Elsewhere Wells wrote: "It would become the logical nucleus of the world's research universities and post-graduate studies." He suggested that the organization he was proposing "would outgrow in scale and influence alike any single university that exists, and it would inevitably take the place of the loose-knit university system of the world in the concentration of research and thought and the direction of the general education of mankind". In fact the new encyclopedism he was advocating was "the only possible method I can imagine, of bringing the universities and research institutions around the world into effective cooperation and creating an intellectual authority sufficient to control and direct collective life". Ultimately the World Encyclopaedia would be "a permanent institution, a mighty super-university, holding together, utilizing and dominating all of the teaching and research organizations at present in existence".

=== Speech to the Congrès Mondial De La Documentation Universelle ===
This section provides a brief excerpt of Wells's speech at the World Congress of Universal Documentation, 20 August 1937. He tells the participants directly that they are participating in the creation of a world brain. He says:

I am speaking of a process of mental organisation throughout the world which I believe to be as inevitable as anything can be in human affairs. The world has to pull its mind together, and this is the beginning of its effort. The world is a Phoenix. It perishes in flames and even as it dies it is born again. This synthesis of knowledge is the necessary beginning to the new world.

=== The Informative Content of Education ===
This section was delivered as the Presidential Address to the Educational Science Section of the British Association for the Advancement of Science, 2 September 1937.

Wells expresses his dismay at the general state of public ignorance, even among the educated, and suggest that the Educational Science Section focus on the bigger picture:

For this year I suggest we give the questions of drill, skills, art, music, the teaching of languages, mathematics and other symbols, physical, aesthetic, moral and religious training and development, a rest, and that we concentrate on the inquiry: What are we telling young people directly about the world in which they are to live?

He asks how the "irreducible minimum of knowledge" can be imparted to all people within ten years of education—realistically, he says, amounting to 2400 hours of classroom instruction. He suggests minimizing the teaching of names and dates in British history and focusing instead on newly available information about prehistory, early civilisation (without the traditionally heavy emphasis on Palestine and the Israelites), and the broad contours of world history. He suggests better education in geography, with an inventory of the world's natural resources, and a better curriculum in money and economics. He calls for a "modernised type of teacher", better paid, with better equipment, and continually updated training.

== Influence ==
=== 1930s: World Congress of Universal Documentation ===
One of the stated goals of this Congress, held in Paris, France, in 1937, was to discuss ideas and methods for implementing Wells's ideas of the World Brain. Wells himself gave a lecture at the Congress.

Reginald Arthur Smith extended Wells's ideas in the book A Living Encyclopædia: A Contribution to Mr. Wells's New Encyclopædism (London: Andrew Dakers Ltd., 1941).

=== 1960s: The World Brain as a supercomputer ===
==== From World Library to World Brain ====
In his 1962 book Profiles of the Future, Arthur C. Clarke predicted that the construction of what H. G. Wells called the World Brain would take place in two stages. He identified the first stage as the construction of the World Library, which is basically Wells's concept of a universal encyclopaedia accessible to everyone from their home on computer terminals. He predicted this phase would be established (at least in the developed countries) by the year 2000. The second stage, the World Brain, would be a superintelligent artificially intelligent supercomputer that humans would be able to mutually interact with to solve various world problems. The "World Library" would be incorporated into the "World Brain" as a subsection of it. He suggested that this supercomputer should be installed in the former war rooms of the United States and the Soviet Union once the superpowers had matured enough to agree to co-operate rather than conflict with each other. Clarke predicted the construction of the "World Brain" would be completed by the year 2100.

In 1964, Eugene Garfield published an article in the journal Science introducing the Science Citation Index; the article's first sentence invoked Wells's "magnificent, if premature, plea for the establishment of a world information center", and Garfield predicted that the Science Citation Index "is a harbinger of things to come—a forerunner of the World Brain".

=== 1990s: World Wide Web of documents ===
==== World Wide Web as a World Brain ====
Brian R. Gaines in his 1996 paper "Convergence to the Information Highway" saw the World Wide Web as an extension of Wells's "World Brain" that individuals can access using personal computers. In papers published in 1996 and 1997 (that did not cite Wells), Francis Heylighen and Ben Goertzel envisaged the further development of the World Wide Web into a global brain, i.e. an intelligent network of people and computers at the planetary level. The difference between "global brain" and "world brain" is that the latter, as envisaged by Wells, is centrally controlled, while the former is fully decentralised and self-organizing.

In 2001, Doug Schuler, a professor at Evergreen State University, proposed a worldwide civic intelligence network as the fulfillment of Wells's world brain. As examples he cited Sustainable Seattle and the "Technology Healthy City" project in Seattle.

==== Wikipedia as a World Brain ====
A number of commentators have suggested that Wikipedia represents the World Brain as described by Wells. Joseph Reagle has compared Wells's warning about the need to defend the World Encyclopedia from propaganda with Wikipedia's "Neutral Point of View" norm:

In keeping with the universal vision, and anticipating a key Wikipedia norm, H. G. Wells was concerned that his World Brain be an "encyclopedia appealing to all mankind", and therefore it must remain open to corrective criticism, be skeptical of myths (no matter how "venerated") and guard against "narrowing propaganda". This strikes me as similar to the pluralism inherent in the Wikipedia "Neutral Point of View" goal of "representing significant views fairly, proportionately, and without bias".

== See also ==
- Citizendium
- Collective intelligence
- Encyclopedia Galactica
- Joël de Rosnay
- Noosphere
- Organizational learning
- The Forbin Project
- The Library of Babel
