= Derwent Capital Markets =

- Company type: Limited Company
- Founded: 2008, United Kingdom
- Founder: Paul Hawtin
- Defunct: 2013
- Fate: Liquidated
- Headquarters: Berkeley Square, London, United Kingdom
- Key people: Paul Hawtin - CEO and Founder
- Products: Derwent Absolute Return Fund aka "Twitter Hedge Fund"
- Website: www.derwentcapitalmarkets.com

Derwent Capital Markets was a British investment company that was a pioneer in the use of social media sentiment analysis to trade financial derivatives. Derwent Capital Market's registered office was in London. The fund was quietly liquidated by 2013.

== History ==
The company was founded in 2008 by co-owner Paul Hawtin.

In February 2011 Derwent Capital Markets launched a hedge fund using Twitter for investment direction. An academic study by Johan Bollen (Indiana University), Huina Mao (Indiana University), and Xiao-Jun Zeng (University of Manchester) established the connection between emotion-related words appearing in Twitter posts and subsequent movements in the Dow Jones Industrial Average.

In May 2013, Paul Hawtin, the Founder of Derwent Capital Markets launched Cayman Atlantic , an investment management firm that uses real-time social media data such as Twitter to find valuable trading opportunities.

As of December 2013, the websites for Derwent Capital Markets and Cayman Atlantic no longer function and the companies have been struck off.
