= Johan Bollen =

Belgian writer and scientist

- Born: 5 November 1971 (age 54); Belgium
- Citizenship: United States of America
- Known for: Twitter mood predictions, Science of Science, MESUR
- Scientific career
- Fields: Complex Systems and Networks, Science of Science
- Workplaces: Indiana University
- Doctoral advisor: Francis Heylighen
- Website: http://informatics.indiana.edu/jbollen/index.html

Johan Lambert Trudo Maria Bollen (born 1971) is a scientist investigating complex systems and networks, the relation between social media and a variety of socio-economic phenomena such as the financial markets, public health, and social well-being, as well as Science of Science with a focus on impact metrics derived from usage data. He presently works as Professor of Informatics and Cognitive Science at Indiana University Bloomington and a fellow at the SparcS Institute of Wageningen University and Research Centre in the Netherlands. He is best known for his work on computational social science, scholarly impact metrics, measuring public well-being from large-scale social media data, and correlating Twitter mood to stock market prices.

He has taught courses on collective intelligence, data mining, information retrieval, and digital libraries. His research has been funded by National Institute of Health, The Andrew W. Mellon Foundation, National Science Foundation, Library of Congress, National Aeronautics and Space Administration and the Los Alamos National Laboratory. In his free time, he DJs at the Root Cellar Lounge in Bloomington, Indiana. He specializes in Deep House and Techno.

== Biography ==
Bollen received his MS in experimental psychology from the Free University of Brussels in 1993 after a master thesis "Learning to Select Activities: a Conditionable System for an Autonomous Robot that Learns to Use Drive Reduction as Reinforcement." He defended his Ph.D. in psychology from the Free University of Brussels in October 2001 on the subject of cognitive models of human hypertext navigation. From 2002 to 2005 he was an assistant professor at the Department of Computer Science of Old Dominion University. He was a staff scientist at the Los Alamos National Laboratory from 2005 to 2009. He is currently a professor of Informatics and Cognitive Science at Indiana University.

== Work ==
Bollen's work has been extensively covered in the press and popular media and has received over 21,000 citations (2024 h-index 47). Bollen was awarded two patents: one for "Usage based indicators to assess the impact of scholarly works: architecture and method" (US 8135662 B2) and "Predicting economic trends via network communication mood tracking" (US 8380607 B2). His work has found widespread application, e.g. in systems for digital library recommendations systems (Ex Libris bX Recommender Service) and in systems that use social media information to generate financial trading signals. As a result of his work on predicting the stock market based on Twitter mood, Derwent Capital Markets started the Absolute Return fund, the worlds's first Twitter hedge fund. However, it later shut down after thirteen months.

== Selected academic works ==
Bollen has published over 100 papers. A selection of the highly cited ones:

- 2011, Twitter mood predicts the stock market.
- 2005, Co-authorship networks in the digital library research community.
- 2009, Modeling public mood and emotion: Twitter sentiment and socio-economic phenomena
- 2006: Bollen, Johan; Rodriquez, Marko A.; Van de Sompel, Herbert (2006). "Journal status". Scientometrics. 69 (3): 669–687.
- 2009, A Principal Component Analysis of 39 Scientific Impact Measures
- 2005, Toward alternative metrics of journal impact: A comparison of download and citation data
- 2014, Proposed SOFA, a new method for distribution of research funding.
