= Living Earth Simulator Project =

The Living Earth simulator is a proposed massive computer simulation system intended to simulate the interactions of all aspects of life, human economic activity, climate, and other physical processes on the planet Earth as part of the FuturICT project, in response to the European FP7 "Future and Emerging Technologies Flagship" initiative.

The Future and Emerging Technologies 'flagship' competition offered a 10-years, ~€1 billion funding to the winning teams; the competition attracted over 300 international teams.

The FuturICT project was not selected and thus the Living Earth Simulator was never developed. The two winners, announced as of March 2013, were Graphene and Human Brain.
