= Jose Luis Mateos =

Jose Luis Mateos Trigos
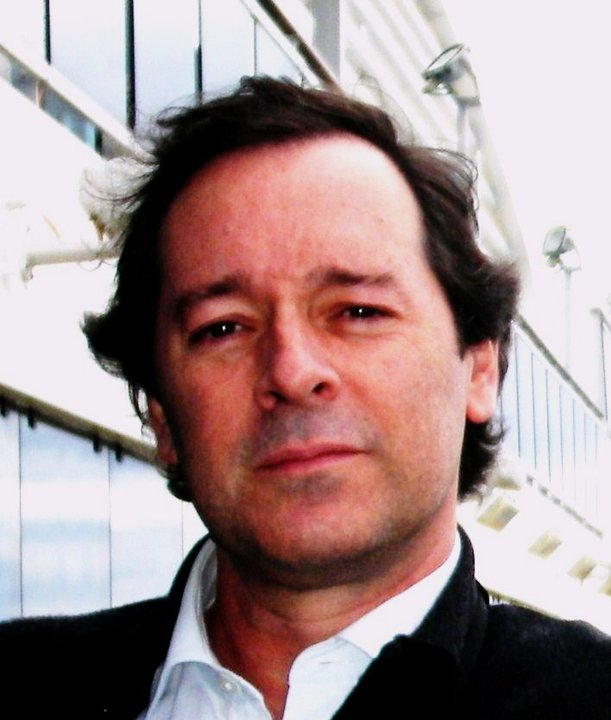
- Born: July 13, 1961 (age 65); Mexico City, Mexico
- Awards: Jorge Lomnitz, Prize of the Mexican Academy of Sciences and the Institute of Physics, UNAM (2003)
- Scientific career
- Workplaces: National Autonomous University of Mexico

Jose Luis Mateos Trigos (born 13 July 1961) is a theoretical physicist working at the National Autonomous University of Mexico (UNAM), doing research on Complex Systems, Network Science and Statistical Physics.

== Education ==
Born in Mexico City, Mateos obtained his PhD in Physics from the National Autonomous University of Mexico UNAM in Mexico City, with a thesis on earthquakes and seismic waves, in particular the seismic response of the Valley of Mexico during the earthquakes of September 1985. Then, he went to Boston, Massachusetts, to have a postdoctoral stay as a visiting professor at the Physics Department of Northeastern University. There he started to work on Nonlinear Dynamics and Chaos. Back in Mexico City, in the Department of Complex Systems of the Institute of Physics UNAM, he continued his research on interdisciplinary and statistical physics and non linear dynamics: more specifically on transport on nonlinear chaotic systems with or without noise (ratchets) and Brownian motors. Later on, he started to work on anomalous diffusion and Lévy flights in physics and biology. More recently, he has been interested in Network Science, doing research on Lévy random walks on networks.

== Honors and awards ==
- Member of the Mexican Academy of Sciences (1998)
- Humboldt Fellowship Recipient. Alexander von Humboldt Foundation, Germany ( 2002)
- Member of the C3 Commission on Statistical Physics of the International Union of Pure and Applied Physics IUPAP

== Personal life ==
Jose Luis Mateos has made many media appearances both in radio and TV, and host a radio show, together with Luis Manuel Guerra, on Radio Red 1110 AM.

== Selected publications ==
- J. L. Mateos, J. Flores, O. Novaro, T. H. Seligman y J. M. Alvarez-Tostado. Resonant response models for the Valley of Mexico-II; the trapping of horizontal P waves. In Geophysical Journal International,1993. Vol. 113, pp. 449–462.
- G. García-Calderón, J. L. Mateos y M. Moshinsky. Resonant Spectra and the Time Evolution of the Survival and Nonescape Probabilities. In Physical Review Letters, 1995. Vol. 74, pp. 337–340.
- José L. Mateos. Chaotic Transport and Current Reversal in Deterministic Ratchets. In Physical Review Letters, 2000. Vol. 84, pp. 258–261.
- Gabriel Ramos-Fernández, José L. Mateos, Octavio Miramontes, Germinal Cocho, Hernán Larralde and Bárbara Ayala-Orozco. Lévy walk patterns in the foraging movements of spider monkeys (Ateles geoffroyi), In Behavioral Ecology and Sociobiology, 2004. Vol. 55 (Number 3), pp. 223–230.
- Marcin Kostur, Peter Hänggi, Peter Talkner and José L. Mateos. Anticipated synchronization in coupled inertial ratchets with time-delayed feedback: A numerical study, In Physical Review E, 2005. Vol. 72, 036210.
- Denis Boyer, Gabriel Ramos-Fernández, Octavio Miramontes, José L. Mateos, Germinal Cocho, Hernán Larralde, Humberto Ramos, and Fernando Rojas. Scale-free foraging by primates emerges from their interaction with a complex environment. In Proceedings of the Royal Society B, 2006. Vol. 273, 1743-1750.
- Alejandro V. Arzola, Karen Volke-Sepúlveda, and José L. Mateos.Experimental Control of Transport and Current Reversals in a Deterministic Optical Rocking Ratchet, In Physical Review Letters, 2011. Vol. 106, Issue 16, 168104.
- Riascos and José L. Mateos. Long-range navigation on complex networks using Lévy random walks. In Physical Review E, 2012. Vol. 86, Issue 5, 056110.
- A. P. Riascos and José L. Mateos. Fractional dynamics on networks: Emergence of anomalous diffusion and Lévy flights. In Physical Review E, 2014. Vol. 90, Issue 3, 032809.
