= Arturo Rosenblueth Foundation =

Mexican academic non-profit organisation

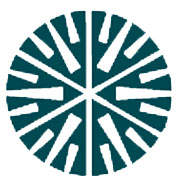
- Founded: July 5, 1978
- Location: Mexico City, Mexico
- Region served: Latin America
- Website: www.rosenblueth.mx

Arturo Rosenblueth Foundation, named in honor of the Mexican scientist Arturo Rosenblueth Stearns, focuses on the field of applied computer science, information systems and information technology.

It is a Mexican academic institution nonprofit. Founded in 1978 by a group of professionals and academics.

Since its inception, the foundation has as its paradigm the technology development to solve relevant problems of Mexico, as well as training qualified in the field of human resources, computing and information applied to solve the problems of society.

It has also developed several technological projects of great impact in Mexico, as in education, health, transport, urban infrastructure, security and quality of life, among others; also participated in the consultation for the recognition of the rights of indigenous peoples organized by the EZLN, 6 on March 21, 1999.

The institution collaborates with various organizations and is part of different organizations' accreditation and computing in Mexico. As ANIEI, CONAIC, Conacyt, CANATI of the General Coordination of Technological Universities Assessment Board Plans and Programs of the Secretariat of Public Education.

Since 1980 annually awards the prize Alejandro Medina, which is a prize in informatics awarded by the Foundation Arturo Rosenblueth to professionals and researchers who have made technological contributions to society.
