= Francis Heylighen =

Belgian cyberneticist (born 1960)

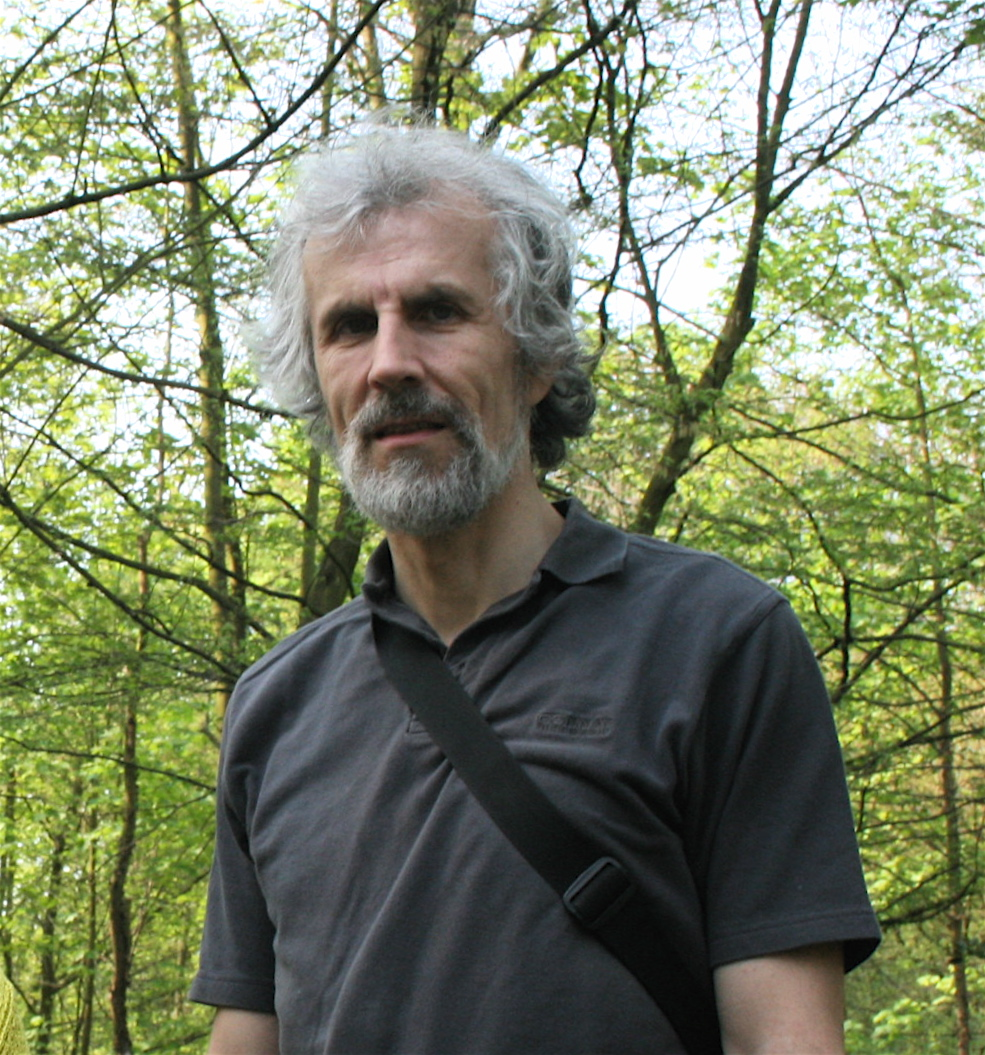
- Born: 27 September 1960 (age 65); Vilvoorde, Belgium
- Known for: Principia Cybernetica, research on self-organization, adaptive representation, memetics, global brain
- Scientific career
- Fields: Cybernetics, complex systems,
- Workplaces: Vrije Universiteit Brussel
- Doctoral students: Johan Bollen, Carlos Gershenson
- Website: pcp.vub.ac.be/HEYL.html

Francis Paul Heylighen (born 27 September 1960) is a Belgian cyberneticist investigating the emergence and evolution of intelligent organization. He presently works as a research professor at the Vrije Universiteit Brussel (the Dutch-speaking Free University of Brussels), where he directs the transdisciplinary "Center Leo Apostel" and the research group on "Evolution, Complexity and Cognition". He is best known for his work on the Principia Cybernetica Project, his model of the Internet as a global brain, and his contributions to the theories of memetics and self-organization. He is also known, albeit to a lesser extent, for his work on gifted people and their problems.

== Biography ==
Heylighen was born on September 27, 1960, in Vilvoorde, Belgium. He received his high school education from the "Koninklijk Atheneum Pitzemburg" in Mechelen, in the section Latin-Mathematics. He received his MSc in mathematical physics in 1982 from the Vrije Universiteit Brussel (VUB), where he also received his PhD Summa cum Laude in Sciences in 1987 for his thesis, published in 1990, as "Representation and Change. A Metarepresentational Framework for the Foundations of Physical and Cognitive Science."

In 1983 he started working as a researcher for the Belgian National Fund for Scientific Research (NFWO). In 1994 he became a tenured researcher at the NFWO and in 2001 a research professor at the VUB. Since 1995 he has been affiliated with the VUB's Center Leo Apostel for interdisciplinary studies. In 2004 he created the ECCO research group which he presently directs. Thanks to a grant from a private sponsor, in 2012 he additionally founded the Global Brain Institute at the Vrije Universiteit Brussel, becoming its first director.

In 1989 Valentin Turchin and Cliff Joslyn founded the Principia Cybernetica Project, and Heylighen joined a year later. In 1993 he created the project's encyclopedic site, one of the first complex websites in the world. In 1996, Heylighen founded the "Global Brain Group", an international discussion forum that provides a working platform for most of the scientists who have worked on the concept of emergent Internet intelligence. Heylighen was also one of the founders and former editors of the Journal of Memetics which ceased publication in 2008.

Heylighen is a Fellow of the World Academy of Art and Science, and of the Web Intelligence Academy as well as a member of the Global Agenda Council on Complex Systems of the World Economic Forum. His biography has been listed since 2002 in Marquis Who's Who in the world. In 2015, he received an "Outstanding Technology Contribution Award" from the Web Intelligence Consortium, for his research on the Global Brain.

== Work ==
Heylighen's research focuses on the emergence and evolution of complex, intelligent organization. Applications include the origin of life, the development of multicellular organisms, knowledge, culture, and societies, and the impact of information and communication technologies on present and future social evolution.

=== Basic ideas ===
This broad variety of work is held together by two basic principles. The relational principle notes that phenomena do not exist on their own but only in relation (connection or distinction) to other phenomena. They thus only make sense as part of an encompassing network or system. The evolutionary principle notes that variation through (re)combination of parts and natural selection of the fitter combinations results in ever more complex and adaptive systems. This principle is a direct application of Universal Darwinism, the idea that Darwinian mechanisms can be extended to virtually all disciplines and problem domains.

The two principles come together in Heylighen's concept of distinction dynamics. In his analysis, classical scientific methodology is based on given, unchanging distinctions between elements or states. Therefore, it is intrinsically unable to model creative change. But the evolutionary principle makes distinctions dynamic, explaining the creation and destruction of relations, distinctions, and connections, and thus helping us to understand how and why complex organization emerges.

Moreover, any system must be adapted to its environment, which implies that it is able to react adequately to changes in that environment. This is the origin of mind or intelligence, as the system should be able to select the right actions for the given conditions. These "condition-action" relations are the basis of knowledge. As systems evolve, their adaptiveness tends to increase, and therefore also their knowledge or intelligence. Thus, the general trend of evolution is self-organization, or a spontaneous increase in intelligent organization.

=== Principia Cybernetica ===
Together with Cliff Joslyn and the late Valentin Turchin, Heylighen is a founding editor of the Principia Cybernetica Project, which is devoted to the collaborative development of an evolutionary-systemic philosophy. He created its website, the Principia Cybernetica Web, in 1993, as one of the first complex webs in the world. It is still viewed as one of the most important sites on cybernetics, systems theory and related approaches.

=== The Global Brain ===
In 1996, Heylighen founded the "Global Brain Group", an international discussion forum that groups most of the scientists who have worked on the concept of emergent Internet intelligence. Together with his PhD student Johan Bollen, Heylighen was the first to propose algorithms that could turn the world-wide web into a self-organizing, learning network that exhibits collective intelligence, i.e. a Global brain.

In the 2007 article "The Global Superorganism: an evolutionary-cybernetic model of the emerging network society" Heylighen gave a detailed exposition of the superorganism/global brain view of society, and an examination of the underlying evolutionary mechanisms, with applications to the ongoing and future developments in a globalizing world. Presently, he is developing a detailed mathematical and simulation model of the global brain, together with his collaborators in the Global Brain Institute.

== See also ==
- Global brain
- Valentin Turchin
- Cliff Joslyn
- Principia Cybernetica

== Publications ==
Heylighen has published over 100 papers and a book. A selection:

- 2016. Stigmergy as a universal coordination mechanism I: Definition and components. Cognitive Systems Research, 38, 4–13. https://doi.org/10.1016/j.cogsys.2015.12.002
- 2015. Return to Eden? Promises and Perils on the Road to a Global Superintelligence. In B. Goertzel & T. Goertzel (Eds.), The End of the Beginning: Life, Society and Economy on the Brink of the Singularity. Humanity+ Press.
- 2013. Self-organization in Communicating Groups: the emergence of coordination, shared references and collective intelligence. In A. Massip-Bonet & A. Bastardas-Boada (Eds.), Complexity perspectives on language, communication, and society, (pp. 117–150). Springer.
- 2008. Cultural evolution and memetics. Encyclopedia of Complexity and System Science, B. Meyers, ed.: Springer
- 2007. The Global Superorganism: an evolutionary-cybernetic model of the emerging network society. In: Social Evolution & History. Vol 6 No. 1, p. 58-119
- — (2007). "Accelerating socio-technological evolution: from ephemeralization and stigmergy to the Global Brain" (PDF). In Modelski, George; Devezas, Tessaleno; Thompson, William (eds.). Globalization as evolutionary process: Modeling global change. Rethinking Globalizations. London: Routledge. pp. 284–335. ISBN 978-0-415-77361-4. ISBN 978-1-135-97764-1.
- 2007. Characteristics and Problems of the Gifted: neural propagation depth and flow motivation as a model of intelligence and creativity
- 2001. The science of self-organization and adaptivity. The Encyclopedia of Life Support Systems 5 (3), 253-280
- 2001. Cybernetics and second order cybernetics, with C Joslyn. Encyclopedia of physical science & technology 4, 155-170
- 1999. Collective Intelligence and its Implementation on the Web: algorithms to develop a collective mental map. Computational & Mathematical Organization Theory 5 (3), 253-280
- 1999. The growth of structural and functional complexity during evolution. The evolution of complexity, 17-44
- 1992. A cognitive-systemic reconstruction of Maslow's theory of self-actualization. Behavioral Science 37 (1), 39-58
