= Herman H. Fussler =

- Born: Herman Howe Fussler; May 15, 1914; Philadelphia, Pennsylvania, U.S.
- Died: March 2, 1997 (aged 82); Raleigh, North Carolina, U.S.
- Education: University of North Carolina; University of Chicago
- Occupations: Administrator, librarian, writer, editor
- Employer(s): New York Public Library, University of Chicago Libraries
- Known for: "New Technologies" i.e. microphotography, New "Service Concepts", "Conception and Design of the Joseph Regenstein Library of the University of Chicago"
- Spouse: Gladys Otten (Died in 1991)
- Children: Barbara Lynn Padgett
- Parent(s): Karl Hartley and Irene (Howe) Fussler
- Relatives: Julia Lunsford (Sister)

Herman Howe Fussler (May 15, 1914 – March 2, 1997) was an American librarian, library administrator, teacher, writer and editor, who was a pioneer in the use of microphotography. He was the librarian for the Manhattan Project. Fussler was ranked as one of the "100 of the Most Important Leaders we had in the 20th Century" by American Libraries. Fussler served as director of the University of Chicago libraries from 1948 to 1971, was Dean of the University of Chicago Graduate Library School, from 1961 to 1963, and was instrumental in the founding of the Regenstein Library. He helped create the Center for Research Libraries. He was an elected fellow of the American Academy of Arts and Sciences and the American Association for the Advancement of Science.

== Early years ==
Born in Philadelphia, Fussler moved to Chapel Hill, North Carolina as a child, where his father became a physics professor at the University of North Carolina. As a high school student, Fussler developed an interest in microphotography while working in the university's physics department; an interest which stayed with him throughout his life.

== Education and career ==
=== University of North Carolina ===
Fussler attended the University of North Carolina, and in 1935 received his A.B. degree in mathematics. Louis Round Wilson, who was a friend of the Fussler family, encouraged Fussler to become a librarian. In 1936, Fussler received his bachelor's degree in Library Science. During his schooling, Fussler's social world flourished as well; a year later, Fussler married Gladys Foster Otten. They had one child, a daughter, named Barbara Lynn. The summer after Fussler graduated from the University of North Carolina, he accepted a position with the New York Public Library (NYPL). He worked in the Science and Technology Division in the library and was noticed by Harry Miller Lydenberg, the then Director of NYPL, and Keyes Metcalf, who was currently the head of the Reference Department. Even though Fussler was offered a full-time position with the NYPL, he decided to accept an offer from Director M. Llewellyn Raney to work for the libraries at the University of Chicago.

=== University of Chicago ===
While at the University of Chicago, Fussler continued his education, receiving his M.A. in 1941 and PhD in 1948. When he arrived from New York, Fussler was asked to start up the Department of Photographic Reproduction. Fussler ran the department for ten years from 1936–1946. He also major directed a microphotographic copying project at the World Congress of Universal Documentation Paris in 1937.

He was also science librarian for the university As the science librarian, his responsibility was to "oversee the collection development and administration of the departmental libraries."

Fussler was appointed assistant director, associate director, and then director of the university libraries. He held that title from 1948 to 1971 and is renowned for his pioneering efforts in library automation including the bibliographic master file.

Fussler served on the U.S. National Advisory Commission on Libraries in 1966 formed to "make a comprehensive study and appraisal of the role of libraries as resources for scholarly pursuits, as centers for the dissemination of knowledge, and as components of the evolving national information systems." The final report, Libraries at Large: Tradition, Innovation, and the National Interest,, provided documentation for legislation that led to the establishment of the National Commission on Libraries and Information Science.

In 1971, Fussler decided to step down, so that he could pursue his other passion full-time, teaching. He had the same sense of enthusiasm while teaching graduate students that he did for working in the university libraries. He began as an instructor in 1942, became an assistant professor in 1944, a professor in 1948, and acting dean of the library school in 1961.

During his term as library director, Fussler published several articles in scholarly publications such as Library Quarterly and American Documentation. In these articles he wrote about problems that face academic libraries and what he expected to see in happen in these libraries the future.

The importance of teaching, research, study, and investigation of sound, well-supported and well-managed scholarly libraries will be far more widely understood. The bases of support for libraries will be broadened, but we are unlikely to be rich or, perhaps, even well supported. The role of the library as an auxiliary to teaching, research, and study will continue to be complex. It is likely that some officers and faculty members of institutions of higher education will still not have a thorough grasp of the relation of the library to the objectives of the university.

He was a member of the Caxton Club, the bibliophilic society of Chicago.

== Center for Research Libraries (CRL) ==
In the 1940s, Fussler and some of his colleagues began considering how they could create a storage facility for important, expensive, and underused texts, mainly those for research purposes. Following the example set forth by the New England Deposit Library, librarians from the Midwestern schools known as the Big Ten, as well as Fussler came together to make this dream a reality. The Carnegie Corporation and the Rockefeller Foundation provided much needed grants to open the Midwest Inter-Library Center (MILC). The MILC is known today as the CRL or Center for Research Libraries.

== Regenstein Library ==
Fussler was asked to help with the planning of a new Library for the University of Chicago. He was genuinely frustrated that there were certain school departments that housed their libraries' collections in several buildings. He believed that these departments should join forces and house their materials together under one roof in this new construction. In 1965, the Joseph and Helen Regenstein Foundation granted ten million dollars to be put to use to create the new university library that would incorporate several departments' materials. Fussler worked closely with the architect Ralph Youngren to plan a library that would utilize the space well for patrons and collections alike. Groundbreaking for the Regenstein Library began in 1967 and three years later the library was completed and opened. Herman Fussler died thirty years later, in March 1997.

== Publications as editor ==
- Journal of Documentary Reproduction, associate editor, (1938–1942)
- Library Quarterly, associate editor, (1949)
- American Documentation, (now known as The Journal of the American Society for Information Science and Technology), associate editor, (1950–1952)

== Selected published works ==
- Fussler, Herman Howe. 1942. Photographic Reproduction for Libraries, a Study of Administrative Problems. Chicago, Ill.: The University of Chicago Press.
- "Library Buildings for Library Service", editor, (1947)
- "Characteristics of the Research Literature Used by Chemists and Physicists in the United States." Library Quarterly 19 (January 1949): 19-35.
- "The Function of the Library in the Modern College", editor, (1954)
- "The Research Library in Transition", editor, (1957)
- *Fussler, Herman Howe; Simon, Julian Lincoln (1969). Patterns in the Use of Books in Large Research Libraries. Chicago: University of Chicago Press.
- Fussler, Herman H. University of Chicago, and National Science Foundation (U.S.). 1968. Development of an Integrated, Computer-Based, Bibliographical Data System for a Large University Library : Annual Report 1967 /68 to the National Science Foundation from the University of Chicago Library. Springfield, Va.: [Distributed by] Clearinghouse for Federal Scientific & Technical Information.
- "Management Implications for Libraries and Library Schools", editor, (1973)
- Fussler, Herman H. and Karl Kocher. 1977. “Contemporary Issues in Bibliographic Control.” Library Quarterly 47 (July): 237–52.

== Recognition ==
- Melvil Dewey Medal, American Library Association, (1954)
- Board of Regents of the National Library of Medicine, (1963)
- National Advisory Commission on Libraries, (1966)
- Martin A. Ryerson Distinguished Service Professor, University of Chicago, (1974)
- Ralph R. Shaw Award for library literature, (1976)
- Distinguished Career Citation, World Congress of Universal Documentation, (1989)

== Bibliography ==
Davis, D. G. (2003). Fussler, Herman Howe (1914–1997). In Dictionary of American Library Biography. (Vol. 3, pp. 98–102). Westport, CT: Libraries Unlimited. Retrieved January 22, 2011, from Google Books https://books.google.com/books?id=91UjM6TLRJgC&pg=PA102

Fussler, H.H. (1953). Readjustments by the librarian. Library Quarterly. 23(3), 216–229. Retrieved January 22, 2011, from JSTOR 4304233 database

Hahn, T., & Buckland, M. (1998). Historical studies in information science. Medford, NJ: Information Today.

Nappo, Christian A. Pioneers in Librarianship : Sixty Notable Leaders Who Shaped the Field. 2022. Lanham: Rowman & Littlefield.(Herman Howe Fussler: Librarian & Microphotographer).

Kniffel, L., Sullivan, P., & McCormick, E. (1999). 100 of the most important leaders we had in the 20th Century. American Libraries. 30(11), 42.

Vanasco, J. (1997). Obituary: Herman H. Fussler. Bulletin of the American Society for Information Science. Retrieved from .

Wedgeworth, R. (1980). Fussler, Herman Howe (1914– ). In ALA Encyclopedia of Library and Information Services. (pp. 212). American Library Association.
