= International Federation for Information and Documentation =

The International Federation for Information and Documentation (FID) was an international organization that was created to promote universal access to all recorded knowledge through the creation of an international classification system. FID stands for the original French Fédération internationale de documentation.

== Historical Background of FID ==
FID was established on 12 September 1895, in Brussels, as the International Institute of Bibliography (originally Institut International de Bibliographie, or IIB) by two Belgian lawyers, Paul Otlet (1868–1944) and Henri La Fontaine (1854–1943). It was popularly known as the Brussels Institute. Its headquarters was changed to The Hague after 1934. It had gone through a number of changes in name that reflect changes of conceptualization of the field in which it operates.

The changes in names and years are :

- 1931 – The International Institute for Documentation (Institut International de Documentation, IID)
- 1937 – The International Federation for Documentation (Fédération Internationale de Documentation, FID)
- 1988 – The International Federation for Information and Documentation (Fédération Internationale d'Information et de Documentation, FID)

The Institute was one of the sponsors of the first World Congress of Universal Documentation, held in Paris in 1937.

FID was dissolved in 2002.

== Publications ==
- One of the publications of FID was FID Communications.
- Dosa, Marta L. (1980). Conceptual Issues in Environmental Information. Copenhagen: International Federation for Documentation.
