= List of American Library Association awards =

The American Library Association (ALA) is a professional society for librarians and some other information service providers. Its awards program includes "Books, Print & Media Awards"; professional recognition within the library sciences; and scholarships, fellowships and grants. Some of the former are annual book awards with great public visibility.

== Professional recognition awards ==
- ALA Professional Recognition awards
  - ALA Medal of Excellence. An annual award since 1953 for achievement for recent creative leadership of high order, particularly in the fields of library management, library training, cataloging and classification, and the tools and techniques of librarianship.
  - American Library Association Equality Award in recognition of achievement for outstanding contributions toward promoting equality in the library profession.
  - American Library Association Honorary Membership, the Association's highest honor may be conferred on a living citizen of any country whose contribution to librarianship or a closely related field is so outstanding that it is of lasting importance to the advancement of the whole field of library service. It is intended to reflect honor upon the ALA as well as upon the individual.
  - Beta Phi Mu Award recognizing an individual for distinguished service to education for librarianship.
  - Federal Achievement Award. Federal and Armed Forces Libraries Interest Group (FAFLIG).
  - Herb Biblo Outstanding Leadership Award for Social Justice and Equality - administered by the Social Responsibilities Round Table to recognize an individual for outstanding leadership in promoting social justice and/or equality within the library profession.
  - James Madison Award — administered by the Office for Government Relations, from 1989 annually honoring "individuals or groups who have championed, protected and promoted public access to government information and the public's right to know at the national level"
  - Jean E. Coleman Library Outreach Lecture is presented at the annual conference of the American Library Association and is tribute to the work of Jean Ellen Coleman, founding director ALA Office for Library Outreach Services, to ensure that all citizens, particularly Native Americans and adult learners, have access to quality library services.
  - John Sessions Memorial Award -administered by the Reference and User Services Association. Recognizes a library or library system which has made a significant effort to work with the labor community and by doing so has brought recognition to the history and contribution of the labor movement to the development of the United States.
  - Joseph W. Lippincott Award. An annual award established in 1938 to a librarian for distinguished service to the profession of librarianship, such service to include outstanding participation in the activities of the professional library association, notable published professional writing, or other significant activity on behalf of the profession and its aims.
  - Justin Winsor Prize (library) awarded by the Library History Round Table for the year's best library history essay.
  - Phyllis Dain Library History Dissertation Award.

AIA/ALA Library Building Awards — co-sponsored by the American Institute of Architects, honoring excellence in library architecture and design

== Book, print and media awards ==
Key

- Award: Name of the award or list
- First: Year the honor was inaugurated (first awarded)

Two years such as "1958 –1966" signify the honor has been discontinued and was last awarded in the latter year.

- Type: one of {Book, Career, Media, Print, Professional}
- Admin.: ALA Division responsible for the award
- Class: one of the following, if any
  - Recommended lists ("Best of ...") = lists of multiple recommended works
  - Youth Media Awards = honoring work(s) for children or young adults and/or their creators
  - Libraries and librarianship = honoring work about libraries, etc.
- Mo.: Month of announcement

ALA Book, Print & Media Awards
Award	Description	First	Type	Admin.	Class	Mo.
ABC-CLIO Online History Award	Recognizes a person or a group of people producing (1) a freely available online historical collection, or (2) an online tool tailored for the purpose of finding historical materials, or (3) an online teaching aid stimulating creative historical scholarship.	2005-2009	Media	RUSA		
ABC-CLIO/Greenwood Award for Best Book in Library Literature	To recognize those who improve management principles and practice, understanding and application of new techniques, or further the education of librarians or other information specialists.	2009–present	Professional	ALA	Libraries and librarianship	
ALA Notable lists	Notable lists include ALA Notable Books for Adults, ALA Notable Children's Books, ALA Notable Children's Recordings, ALA Notable Children's Videos, ALA Notable Government Documents, ALA Notable Videos for Adults.	various			Recommended lists ("Best of ...")	various
Alex Awards	Given to ten books written for adults that have special appeal to young adults, ages 12 through 18.	1998–present	Book	YALSA	Recommended lists ("Best of ...") Youth Media Awards	Jan
Amazing Audiobooks for Young Adults	To select, annotate, and present for publication an annual list of notable audio recordings significant to young adults from those released in the past two years.	1999–present	Media	YALSA	Recommended lists ("Best of ...")	
Andrew Carnegie Medal for Excellence in Children's Video	Honors outstanding video productions for children.	1991–present	Media	ALSC	Youth Media Awards	Jan
Andrew Carnegie Medals for Excellence in Fiction and Nonfiction	Recognize the best fiction and nonfiction books for adult readers published in the U.S. the previous year. (set of 2 annual: fiction, nonfiction)	2012–present	Book	RUSA		June
Aurianne Award	"Recognize[d] outstanding books on animal life which may develop a humane attitude in children. Given for the best fiction or non-fiction book written for children between the ages of 8-14 years."	1958-1966	Book	ALSC	Youth Media Awards	
Best Apps for Teaching & Learning	"Honors applications of exceptional value to inquiry-based teaching and learning as embodied in the American Association of School Librarians' Standards for the 21st-Century Learner."	2013-2015	Media	AASL	Youth Media Awards	
Best Fiction for Young Adults ("Best Books" to 2010) (Note: The school librarians first issued a list of recommended new books for 1930. From 1966 to 2010 the annual list, originally limited to books marketed for adults, was named "Best Books for Young Adults". The final rendition under that name, for 2010 publications, identified 79 fiction books and 11 nonfiction books. From 2011 the fiction sublist continues alone as "Best Fiction for Young Adults")	Recommended for ages 12–18, meet the criteria of both good quality literature and appealing reading for teens.		Book	YALSA	Recommended lists ("Best of ...")	
Best of the Best of the University Presses	This list highlights titles from the Best of the Best of University Presses that reflect a viewpoint and topical coverage not typically reflected in standard selection tools.	2010–present	Book	AASL	Recommended lists ("Best of ...")	
Best Websites for Teaching & Learning	"Honor[ed] websites, tools, and resources of exceptional value to inquiry-based teaching and learning as embodied in the American Association of School Librarians' Standards for the 21st-Century Learner."	2013-2015	Media	AASL	Youth Media Awards	
Beta Phi Mu/LRRT Research Paper Award	"Recognize[d] excellent research into problems related to the profession of librarianship."			LRRT		
Booklist Editors' Choice	Multiple lists, including Adult Books, Adult Books for Young Adults, Books for Youth, Media, Reference Sources, and Booklist's Top of the List. Chosen by editors of Booklist magazine.	2005–present	Book	Booklist	Recommended lists ("Best of ...")	
Children's Literature Legacy Award (Previously Laura Ingalls Wilder Award)	Honors an author or illustrator whose books, published in the United States, have made, over a period of years, a substantial and lasting contribution to literature for children. (biennial)	1954–present	Career	ALSC	Youth Media Awards	
Coretta Scott King Book Awards	Recognize African-American authors and illustrators of outstanding books for young adults and children that reflect the African-American experience. (set of 3 annual: writer, illustrator, new talent)	1985–present	Book	EMIERT	Youth Media Awards	Jan
Coretta Scott King–Virginia Hamilton Award for Lifetime Achievement	Recognize in alternate years an African-American author or illustrator, and a practitioner, for career contributions.	2010–present	Career	EMIERT	Youth Media Awards	
Dartmouth Medal	A medal that honors the creation of a reference work of outstanding quality and significance, including, but not limited to: writing, compiling, editing, or publishing books or electronic information.	1975–present	Book	RUSA		Jan
David Cohen Multicultural Award	To encourage as well as recognize articles of significant new research and publication that increases understanding and promotes multiculturalism in libraries in North America.	2002-2006	Print	EMIERT	Libraries and librarianship	
Donald G. Davis Article Award	To recognize the best article written in English in the field of United States and Canadian library history including the history of libraries, librarianship, and book culture.	2000–present	Print	LHRT	Libraries and librarianship	
Edward Swanson Memorial Best of LRTS Award	Given to the author(s) of the best paper published in Library Resources & Technical Services, the journal of the Association for Library Collections & Technical Services.	1987–present	Print	ALCTS	Libraries and librarianship	
Eli M. Oboler Memorial Award	"Presented for the best published work in the area of intellectual freedom."	1986–present	Book	IFRT		
Eliza Atkins Gleason Book Award	To recognize the best book written in English in the field of library history, including the history of libraries, librarianship, and book culture.	2004–present	Book	LHRT	Libraries and librarianship	
Ex Libris Student Writing Award	To recognize superior student writing and to enhance the professional development of students through publication of the winning manuscript in LITA's primary journal, Information Technology and Libraries (ITAL).	2001–present	Print	LITA	Libraries and librarianship	
Excellence in Nonfiction for Young Adults	For the best nonfiction book published for young adults (ages 12–18).	2010–present	Book	YALSA	Youth Media Awards	Jan
Fabulous Films for Young Adults	To identify for collection developers a body of films relating to a theme that will appeal to young adults in a variety of settings.	2009–present	Media	YALSA	Recommended lists ("Best of ...")	
Gale Cengage Learning Financial Development Award	Presented to a library organization to recognize an innovative, creative, well-organized project which successfully developed income from alternative sources. The alternative sources may include, but are not limited to: individual gifts, foundations, endowments, "challenge" grants, and related efforts.	1985–present	Professional	ALA	Libraries and librarianship	
Great Graphic Novels for Teens	Graphic novels published in the past 16 months that are recommended reading for teens aged twelve to eighteen.	2009–present	Book	YALSA	Recommended lists ("Best of ...")	
Great Interactive Software for Kids List	Identifies exemplary computer software and multi-platform media for children currently available.	1996-2010	Media	ALSC	Recommended lists ("Best of ...")	
H. W. Wilson Library Periodical Award	For a periodical published by a local, state, or regional library, library group, or library association in the United States or Canada which has made an outstanding contribution to librarianship.	1961-1980	Print	ALA	Libraries and librarianship	
Ilene F. Rockman Instruction Publication of the Year Award	Recognizes an outstanding publication related to instruction in a library environment published in the preceding two years.	1993–present	Print	ACRL	Libraries and librarianship	
Innovation Award	Recognizes a project that demonstrates creative, innovative, or unique approaches to information literacy instruction or programming.	2004-2012	Professional	ACRL		
James Terry White Award	Given for notable published professional writing.	1938-1941	Print	ALA		
Jesse Shera Award for Distinguished Published Research	Recognizes a research article published in English during the calendar year.	1975–present	Print	LRRT	Libraries and librarianship	
John Newbery Medal	To the author of the most distinguished contribution to American literature for children.	1921–present	Book	ALSC	Youth Media Awards	Jan
Justin Winsor Prize Library History Essay Award	Recognizes the best essay written in English on library history	1979–present	Print	LHRT	Libraries and librarianship	
Katharine Kyes Leab and Daniel J. Leab American Book Prices Current Exhibition Catalogue Awards	Recognizes "excellence in the publication of catalogues and brochures that accompany exhibitions of library and archival materials, as well as for electronic exhibitions of such materials."	1991–present		ACRL		
Listen List	Seeks to highlight outstanding audiobook titles that merit special attention by general adult listeners and the librarians who work with them.	2012–present	Media	CODES	Recommended lists ("Best of ...")	
Margaret A. Edwards Award	Honors an author, as well as a specific body of his or her work, that have been popular over a period of time. It recognizes an author's work in helping adolescents become aware of themselves and addressing questions about their role and importance in relationships, society, and in the world.	1988–present	Career	YALSA	Youth Media Awards	Jan
Margaret T. Lane/ Virginia F. Saunders Memorial Research Award	Given annually to an author or shared among collaborative authors of an outstanding research article in which government documents, either published or archival in nature, form a substantial part of the documented research.	2010–present	Print	GODORT		
May Hill Arbuthnot Lecture	Honors an author, critic, librarian, historian, or teacher of children's literature, of any country, for contribution to the field of children's literature.	1970–present	Career	ALSC	Youth Media Awards	July
Michael L. Printz Award	For a book that exemplifies literary excellence in young adult literature.	2000–present	Book	YALSA	Youth Media Awards	Jan
Mildred L. Batchelder Award	Awarded to an American publisher for a children's book considered to be the most outstanding of those books originally published in a foreign language in a foreign country, and subsequently translated into English and published in the United States.	1968–present	Book	ALSC	Youth Media Awards	Jan
Odyssey Award for Excellence in Audiobook Production	Given to the producer of the best audiobook produced for children and/or young adults, available in English in the United States.	2008–present	Media	ALSC	Youth Media Awards	Jan
Outstanding Academic Titles	The best in scholarly titles reviewed by Choice.		Book	ACRL	Recommended lists ("Best of ...")	Jan
Outstanding Books for the College Bound and Lifelong Learners	"To provide reading recommendations to students of all ages who plan to continue their education beyond high school."	2009	Book	YALSA		
Outstanding Comics Award	"These awards highlights the exceptional graphic novels that appeal to adults, teens, and children in the categories of fiction, nonfiction, and series."	2025	Book	GNCRT		
Outstanding Publication Award (Previously Blackwell's Scholarship Award)	Honors the author or authors of the year's outstanding monograph, article or original paper in the field of technical services, including acquisitions, cataloging, collection management, preservation, continuing resources and related areas in the library field.	1976–present	Print	ALCTS	Libraries and librarianship	
Outstanding Reference Sources	To recommend the best reference publications for small and medium-sized libraries.	1958–present	Book	RUSA	Recommended lists ("Best of ...")	
Over the Rainbow Book List	To recognize current quality non-fiction and fiction books that authentically express gay, lesbian, bisexual and transgender experiences.	2011–present	Book	GLBTRT	Recommended lists ("Best of ...")	
Phyllis Dain Library History Dissertation Award	The award recognizes outstanding dissertations in the general area of library history.	1991–present	Print	LHRT	Libraries and librarianship	
Popular Paperbacks for Young Adults	To encourage young adults to read for pleasure by presenting to them lists of popular or topical titles which are widely available in paperback and which represent a broad variety of accessible themes and genres.	2010–present	Book	YALSA	Recommended lists ("Best of ...")	
Public Libraries Feature Article Contest	To recognize articles written by those employed by a public library and published in Public Libraries. (varies)	2004–present	Print	PLA	Libraries and librarianship	
Pura Belpré Award	Presented to a Latino/Latina writer and illustrator whose work best portrays, affirms, and celebrates the Latino cultural experience in an outstanding work of literature for children and youth.(set of 2 annual: writer, illustrator)	1996–present	Book	ALSC	Youth Media Awards	Jan
Quick Picks for Reluctant Young Adult Readers	List is for young adults (ages 12–18) who, for whatever reasons, do not like to read. The purpose of this list is to identify titles for recreational reading, not for curricular or remedial use.	2008–present	Book	YALSA		
Rainbow Book List	List of recommended books dealing with LGBT+ issues and situations for children up to age 18.	2008-2017	Book	SRRT / GLBTRT	Recommended lists ("Best of ...")	
Ralph R. Shaw Award for Library Literature	Presented to an American librarian for an outstanding contribution to library literature published during the three years preceding the presentation.	1959-1976	Print	ALA	Libraries and librarianship	
Randolph Caldecott Medal	Awarded to the artist of the most distinguished American picture book for children.	1938–present	Book	ALSC	Youth Media Awards	Jan
Reference Service Press Award	Recognize the most outstanding article published in Reference and User Services Quarterly	2002–present	Print	RUSA	Libraries and librarianship	
Rise: A Feminist Book Project (Previously Amelia Bloomer Project)	An annual annotated book list (or bibliography) of well-written and well-illustrated books with significant feminist content, intended for young readers (ages birth through 18).^{[2][3][4][5][6][7][8][9][10]}	2004–present	Book	SRRT	Recommended lists ("Best of ...")	
Robert F. Sibert Informational Book Medal	The most distinguished informational book published in English in the preceding year for its significant contribution to children's literature.	2001–present	Book	ALSC	Youth Media Awards	Jan
Schneider Family Book Award	Honors an author or illustrator for a book that embodies an artistic expression of the disability experience for child and adolescent audiences.	2004–present	Book	ALA	Youth Media Awards	
Sophie Brody Award	"Given to encourage, recognize and commend outstanding achievement in Jewish literature."	2006–present	Book	RUSA		
Stonewall Book Awards	Presented to English language books that have exceptional merit relating to the gay/lesbian/bisexual/transgender experience. (set of 3 annual: fiction, nonfiction, youth)	1971–present	Book	GLBTRT	Youth Media Awards (one of 3)	Jan
STS Oberly Award for Bibliography in the Agricultural or Natural Sciences	For the best English-language bibliography in the field of agriculture or a related science.	1925–present	Print	ACRL		
Teen's Top Ten	"A 'teen choice' list, where teens nominate and choose their favorite books of the previous year"	2003-2018	Book	YALSA	Recommended lists ("Best of ...")	
The Reading List	Seeks to highlight outstanding genre fiction that merit special attention by general adult readers and the librarians who work with them.	2009–present	Book	RUSA	Recommended lists ("Best of ...")	
Theodor Seuss Geisel Award	To the author(s) and illustrator(s) of the most distinguished contribution to the body of American children's literature known as beginning reader books published in the United States during the preceding year.	2006–present	Book	ALSC	Youth Media Awards	Jan
W. Y. Boyd Literary Award for Excellence in Military Fiction	"Honors the best fiction set in a period when the United States was at war."	1997–present	Book	ALA		
William C. Morris YA Debut Award	Honors a debut book published by a first-time author writing for teens and celebrating impressive new voices in young adult literature.	2009–present	Book	YALSA	Youth Media Awards	Jan

== Grants and fellowships ==
- ALA Grants and Fellowship awards.

== Scholarships ==
- ALA Scholarships.

== See also ==
- List of LGBTQ literary awards
