= Library history =

Library history is a subdiscipline within library science and library and information science focusing on the history of libraries and their role in societies and cultures. Some see the field as a subset of information history. Library history is an academic discipline and should not be confused with its object of study (history of libraries): the discipline is much younger than the libraries it studies. Library history begins in ancient societies through contemporary issues facing libraries today. Topics include recording mediums, cataloguing systems, scholars, scribes, library supporters and librarians.

== Earliest libraries ==
The earliest records of a library institution as it is presently understood can be dated back to around 5,000 years ago in the Southwest Asian regions of the world. One of the oldest libraries found is that of the ancient library at Ebla (circa 2500 BCE) in present-day Syria. In the 1970s, the excavation at Ebla's library unearthed over 20,000 clay tablets written in cuneiform script.

=== Library in Mesopotamia ===
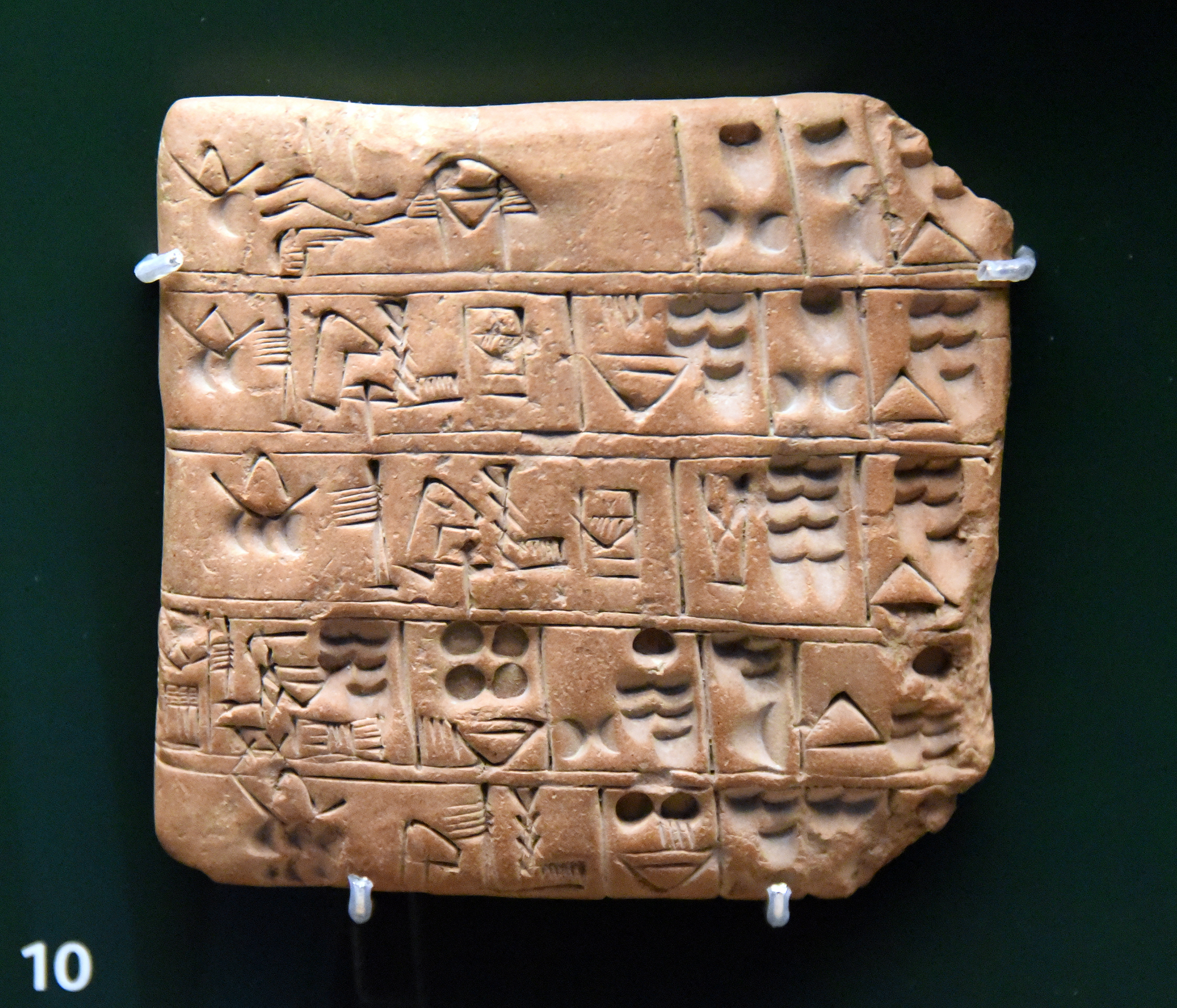
Cuneiform Tablet, circa 3000 BCE

The Assyrian King Assurbanipal created one of the greatest libraries in Nineveh in the seventh century BCE. The collection consisted of over 30,000 tablets written in a variety of languages. The collection was cataloged both by the shape of the tablet and by the subject of the content. The library had separate rooms for the different topics: government, history, law, astronomy, geography, and so on. The tablets also contained myths, hymns, and even jokes. Assurbanipal would send scribes to visit every corner of his kingdom to copy the content of other libraries. His library contained many of the most important literary works of the day, including the epic of Gilgamesh. Assurbanipal's Royal Library also had one of the first library catalogs. Unfortunately, Nineveh was eventually destroyed, and the library was lost in a fire.

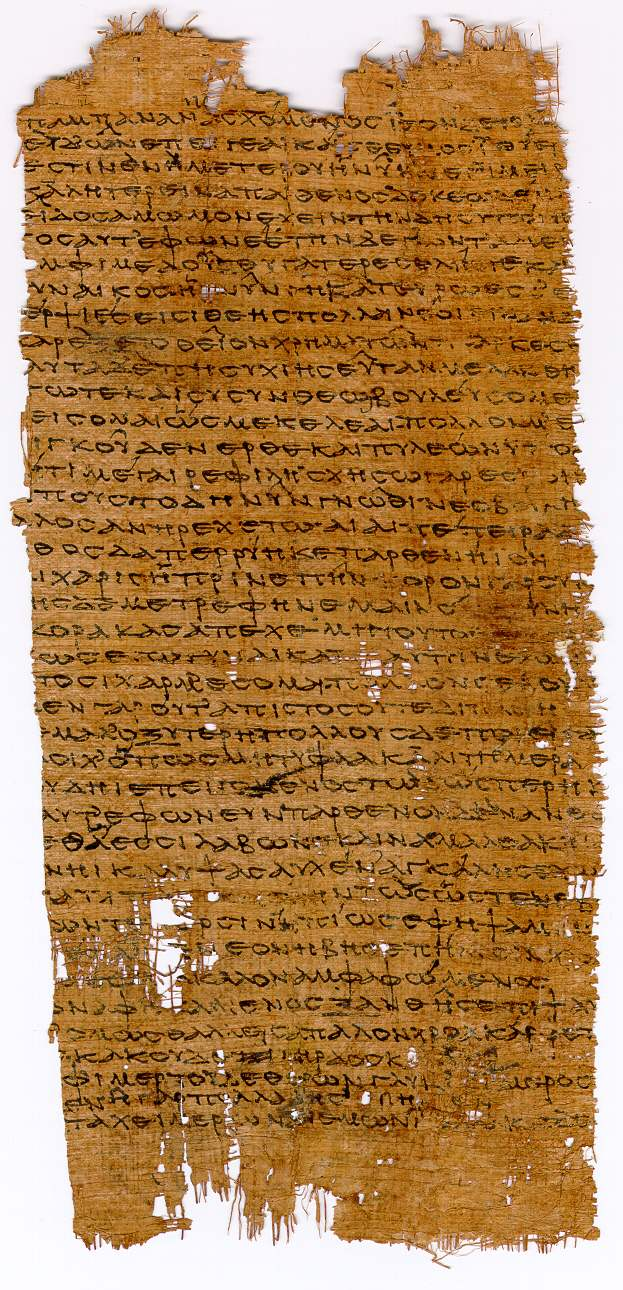
Fragment of Ancient Greek papyrus manuscript

=== Libraries in Ancient Greece ===
The Greek government was the first to sponsor public libraries. By 500 BCE both Athens and Samos had begun creating libraries for the public, though as most of the population was illiterate these spaces were serving a small, educated portion of the community. Athens developed a city archive at the Metroon in 405 BCE, where documents were stored in sealed jars. These would have saved the documents, but they would have been difficult to consult regularly. In Paros, around the same time, contracts were placed in the temple for safe keeping, and a book curse was placed for extra protection.

=== Library of Alexandria ===
The Library at Alexandria, Egypt, was renowned in the third century BCE while kings Ptolemy I Soter and Ptolemy II Philadelphus reigned. The library included a museum, garden, meeting areas and of course reading rooms. The Great Library, as it is known, was one of many in Alexandria. From its inception around the second century BCE, Alexandria was a well-known center for learning. It earned renown as the intellectual capital of the Western world up through the third century CE. The librarians at Alexandria collected, copied, and organized scrolls from across the known world. According to a primary source, every ship that came to Alexandria was required to hand over their books to be copied, and the copies would be returned to the owner, the library keeping the original. The Library of Alexandria was damaged by various disasters over time, including fire, invasion, and earthquake. Scholars believe the collection slowly diminished over time due to theft and efforts to remove it ahead of invading armies. While there are popular stories about how the library was ultimately destroyed, most of these are more myth than fact.

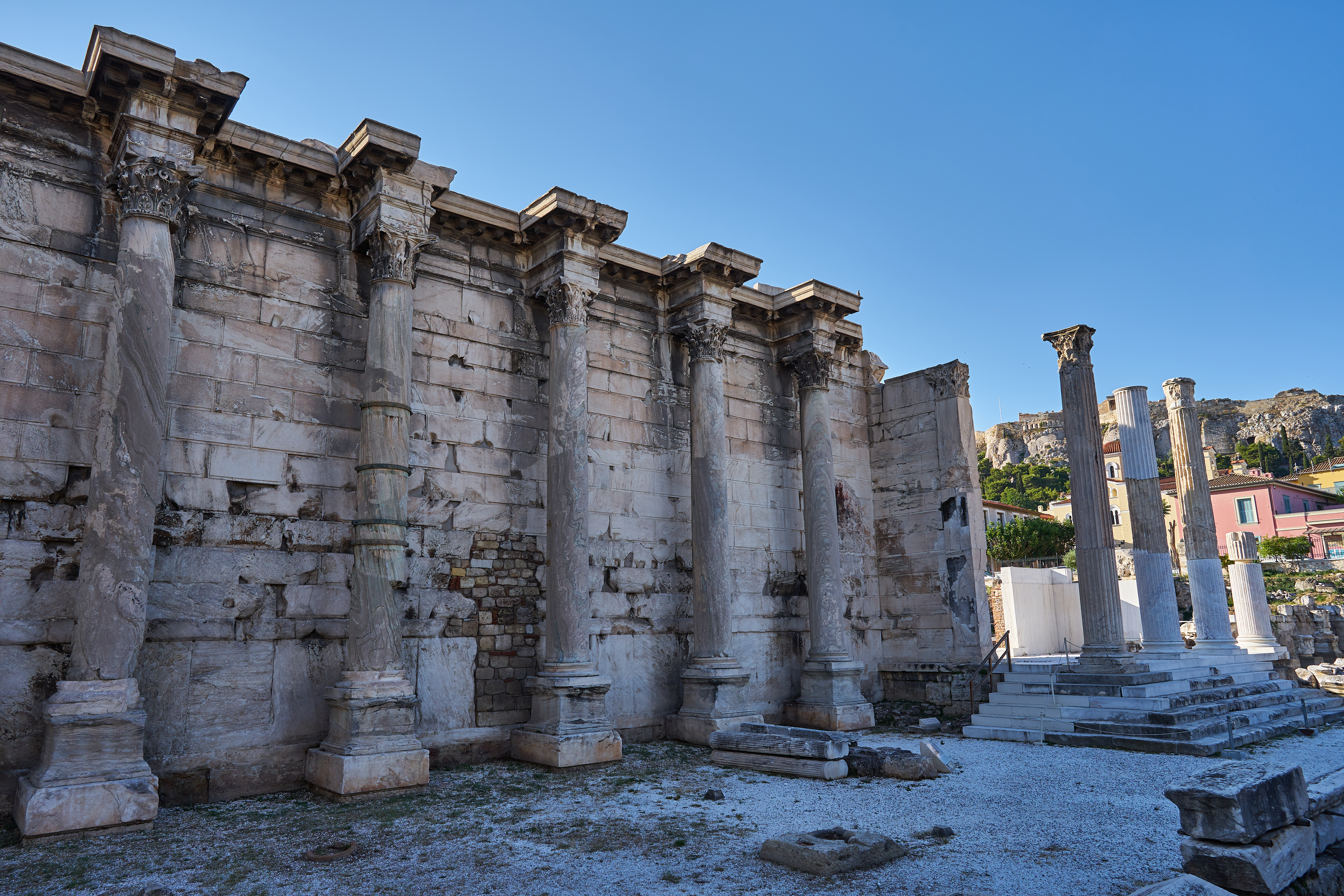
Entrance of Hadrian's Library at the Acropolis of Athens

=== Libraries in Rome ===
Julius Caesar and his successor Augustus were the first to establish public libraries in ancient Rome, including the library of Apollo on the Palatine Hill. Several emperors followed suit over the next four centuries, including Hadrian, Tiberius, and Vespasian. Roman aristocrats also had personal libraries, which usually contained works in both Greek and Latin. A valuable example of this has been found at Herculaneum near Pompeii. Papyrus manuscripts in Herculaneum's Villa of the Papyri were encased in ash after the eruption of Vesuvius in 79 CE. Modern archaeology is now able to scan these artifacts and discern their contents, including many writings from Philodemus.

The average Roman would not have been familiar with books beyond what they might hear read aloud in the forum. Public figures would pay for particular passages to be read aloud to the public from the steps of a public library.

=== Libraries in the Middle Ages ===
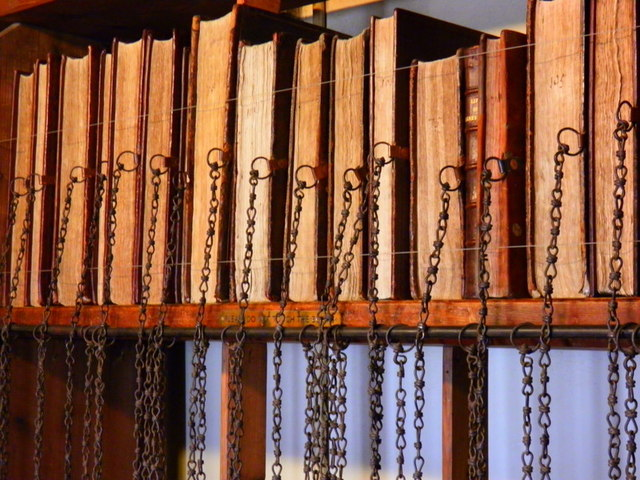
Chained books at Wimborne Minster library

In the European Middle Ages, libraries began to become more prevalent, despite a widespread reduction in new writing beyond religious themes. Most libraries were initially connected to monasteries or religious institutions. Scriptoriums copied Christian religious texts to share with other religious centers or to be read aloud to their own parishioners. The Holy Roman Emperor Charlemagne (r. 786-814) had a large impact on the advancement of written culture in the Medieval Christian world, acquiring as many written works as he could, and employing many scribes to copy and recirculate vernacular versions of religious works. Most of the text held in small personal libraries was still religious in nature.

== Early modern libraries ==
=== Libraries of the Renaissance ===
During the Renaissance era the merchant middle class grew, and more people found benefits in education. They relied on libraries as a place to study and gain knowledge. Libraries provided a valuable resource, enriching the culture of those who were educated. Universities that had been started in the Middle Ages, founded their own libraries. Books in these libraries could not be borrowed from these libraries and were generally chained to the shelves to prevent theft. As more of the population became literate, new ideas like Humanism and Natural Law spawned an increase personal libraries, although they remained small.

Gutenberg's invention of the printing press in 1456 opened the door to the modern era for libraries.

== Oldest working libraries ==
According to the German librarian Michael Knoche, it is not possible to determine which library is the “oldest”: "Precise year dates are a construct, especially in the case of very old libraries. When a collection of books deserves to be called a library depends very much on the point of view of the observer." Various libraries are referred to as the “oldest”:

The library founded in the 6th century of the Saint Catherine's Monastery in Sinai is "reputedly the oldest continuously run library in existence today", according to the Library of Congress. Its collection of religious and secular manuscripts is ranging from Bibles, liturgies and prayer books to legal documents such as deeds, court cases and fatwahs (legal opinions).

The Al Qarawiyyin Library was founded in 859 by Fatima al-Fihri and is often regarded as the oldest working library in the world. It is in Fez, Morocco and is part of the oldest continually operating university in the world, the University of al-Qarawiyyin. The library houses approximately 4,000 ancient Islamic manuscripts. These manuscripts include 9th century Qurans and the oldest known accounts of the Islamic prophet Muhammed.

The Malatestiana Library (Italian: Biblioteca Malatestiana) is a public library in the city of Cesena in northern Italy. Opened in 1454 it is significant for being the first civic library in Europe open to the general public.

== Library history reports and writings of the early 19th and 20th century ==
In the early 19th and 20th century, representative titles were created reporting library history in the United States and the United Kingdom. American titles include Public Libraries in the United States of America, Their History, Condition, and Management (1876), Memorial History of Boston (1881) by Justin Winsor, Public Libraries in America (1894) by William I. Fletcher, and History of the New York Public Library (1923) by Henry M. Lydenberg. British titles include Old English Libraries (1911) by Earnest A. Savage and The Chained Library: A Survey of Four Centuries in the Evolution of the English Library by Burnett Hillman Streeter.

In the beginning of the 20th century, library historians began applying scientific research methodologies to examine the library as a social agency. Two works that demonstrate this argument are Geschichte der Bibliotheken (1925) by Alfred Hessel and the Library Quarterly article from 1931, “The Sociological Beginnings of the Library Movement in America” by Arnold Borden.

With the establishment of library schools, master's theses and doctoral dissertations represented the shift in serious research regarding libraries and library history. Two published doctoral dissertations that mark this trend are Foundations of the Public Library: The Origins of the American Public Library Movement in New England, 1629 – 1855 (1940) by Jesse Shera and Arsenals of a Democratic Culture: A Social History of the American Public Library Movement in New England and the Middle Atlantic States From 1850 to 1900 (1947). Additional models of library historical analysis include The New York Public Library: A History of Its Founding and Early Years by Phyllis Dain, a work that exemplified institutional history and The Power and the Dignity: Librarianship and Katharine L. Sharp by Laurel Grotzinger, a biographical study.

Edward A. Goedeken, writes a biennial review of publications on the history of libraries, librarianship, and information surveys that is published in the journal, Information & Culture

== Cataloging ==
The earliest methods of cataloging involved storing tablets separately based on their content. The subject matter was identified by small descriptions or color coding. Common practice was to have different rooms or chambers for the various subject types. Moving to the Renaissance period, cataloging took on a whole new level. Materials were still stored by content, but now titles were being listed and organized alphabetically. Catalogs were kept in ledger form listing all the materials in the collection, new additions added at the margins, until a librarian would redraft the catalog. Maintaining and revising the catalog became crucially important as collections grew. It was during the Renaissance period that one would find the first catalogs that referenced other collections to make finding materials easier. As printing grew, so did the need for accurate catalogs of material available. Additionally catalogs needed to be descriptive enough to help librarians in the locating and storing of books. As collections grew, so naturally did catalogs. Materials continued to be separated by subject and would then be further divided by more specific heading, still listed and stored within these sub headings alphabetically.

Catalogs were not standardized until the late 19th century and even in the 1800s some libraries had no actual record of their holdings or relied on a brief author list. Much “finding” done in libraries at the time relied on the memory of the librarian. The catalog of the day was a printed book. Printed book catalogs had the same advantages as books themselves: They could be produced in multiple copies and were highly portable. A library could give a copy of its catalog to another library, thus making it possible for users to discover, at a distance, that a library had the item sought. The disadvantages of the printed book catalog, however, became more serious as library collections grew and the rate of growth increased. A library catalog needed near-constant updating. Yet the time required to produce a printed book catalog (in an era in which printing required that each page be typeset) meant that the catalog could be seriously out of date as it came off the press. Updating such a catalog meant reprinting it in its entirety, or staving off an expensive new edition by producing supplementary volumes of newly acquired works, which then made searching quite tedious. In the mid-1800s the library card catalog was already winning hearts and minds. Although neither the book catalog nor the card catalog meets all needs as efficiently as one would desire, the card catalog had already proven itself as an up-to-date instrument for library users and librarians alike. Cards were lauded by Melvil Dewey (1851–1931) in his introduction to early editions of his Decimal Classification, although his classification and “relativ index” in no way required the use of a card system. However, the “Co-Operation Committee” of the newly formed American Library Association (ALA) announced its decision on the standardization of the catalog card in 1877; not coincidentally, Dewey’s library service company, The Library Bureau, founded in 1876, was poised to provide the cards to libraries at a cost lower than custom-produced card stock. The typewriter brought greater uniformity to the card catalog than even the neatest “library hand” could, and undoubtedly increased the amount of information that one could squeeze into the approximate three-by-five surface. When the Library of Congress (LC) developed printed card sets using the ALA standard size and offered them for sale starting in 1902, the use of the card catalog in US libraries was solidified. After Dewey, the person who had the greatest effect on library technology was Henriette Avram (1919–2006), creator of the Machine-Readable Cataloging (MARC) format. This was not only an innovation in terms of library technology, but it was also generally innovative in terms of the computing capability of the time. In the mid-1960s, when MARC was under development, computer capabilities for handling textual data were very crude. For example, look at a magazine mailing label. You will see uppercase characters only, limited field sizes, and often a lack of punctuation beyond perhaps a hash mark for apartment numbers. This is what all data looked like in 1965. However, libraries needed to represent actual document titles, author names, and languages other than English. This meant that the library data record needed to have variable length fields, full punctuation, and diacritical marks. Avram delivered a standard that was definitely ahead of its time. Although the primary focus of the standard was to automate the printing of cards for LC’s card service, Avram worked with staff at LC and other libraries involved in the project to leverage the MARC record for other uses, such as the local printing of “new books” lists. Dewey did not anticipate the availability of the LC printed card service when he proposed the standardization of the library catalog card, yet it was precisely that standardization that made it possible for libraries across America to add LC printed cards to their catalogs. Likewise, Avram did not anticipate the creation of the computerized online catalog during her early work on the MARC format, but it was the existence of years of library cataloging in a machine-readable form that made the Online Public Access Catalog (OPAC) a possibility.

== Wartime librarianship ==
In World War II, American librarians and archivists played a major role in collecting published information about Nazi Germany and also rescuing stolen books and documents the Nazis stole from target countries and from Jews. Archibald MacLeish, the Librarian of Congress, announced that fellow librarians "must become active and not passive agents of the democratic process." The Office of Strategic Services (OSS) took the lead in recruiting and organizing secret expeditions to Europe, often acquiring rare materials from bookshops just before the Gestapo arrived. Massive amounts of books, magazines and documents were collected—too much to transport—so the new technique of micro photography was developed successfully.

After the D-Day landings in 1944, librarians became part of information search teams under Army command, searching especially for current intelligence, as well as patents and technical manuals. Back in Washington, analysts mined the information for projects such as targeting key industrial centers, railroads and chokepoints, and identifying concentration camps and prisoner of war facilities.

When Berlin fell, there was a rush to obtain documentation of top-secret German military research. Furthermore, the teams rescued over two million books stolen from libraries, and 160,000 Jewish books stolen by the Nazis. According to Ernest Hilbert, librarian historian Kathy Peiss shows how the librarians delivered intelligence about enemy technology, propaganda, and infrastructure. They also advanced librarianship, introducing an air of mass foreign acquisitions, widespread film usage, and new techniques for rapidly extracting vital information instead of merely storing.

== Library History Database ==
In 2024 the Library History Round Table published the online "Bibliography of Library History" database which contains over 7,000 entries for books, articles, and theses in library history and related fields published 1990 to 2022.

== Journals ==
- Libraries & the Cultural Record; exploring the history of collections of recorded knowledge (L & C R); until 2006: Libraries & Culture; until 1988: The Journal of Library History; until 1974: Journal of Library History, Philosophy, and Comparative Librarianship; until 1973: The Journal of Library History
- Library & Information History (until 2008: Library History; until 1967: Library Association. Library History Group. Newsletter)
- Library History Review
- Library History Round Table Newsletter (L H R T Newsletter), until 1992: L H R T Newsletter; until 198?: L H R T; until 1979: A L H R T Newsletter
- Information and Culture; a journal of history
- Libraries: Culture, History, and Society, peer-reviewed journal of the Library History Round Table of the American Library Association

== Awards ==
- Phyllis Dain Library History Award
- Donald G. Davis Article Award
- Eliza Atkins Gleason Book Award
- Justin Winsor Prize (library)

== See also ==
- Andrew Carnegie
- History of the Internet
- History of libraries
- History of public library advocacy
- Information history
- Librarian
- Librarians in popular culture
- Libraries & the Cultural Record
- Library
- Library History Round Table
- Library historian
- List of librarians
- List of libraries
- Scribe
- Sociology of the Internet
