= Donald G. Davis, Jr. =

American library historian and educator

- Born: August 15, 1939; San Marcos
- Died: November 21, 2024 (aged 85)
- Alma mater: University of California, Los Angeles; University of California, Berkeley; University of Illinois Urbana-Champaign; Austin Presbyterian Theological Seminary
- Occupation: Librarian
- Employer: University of Texas at Austin School of Information
- Website: www.ischool.utexas.edu/~dgdavis/

Donald G. Davis, Jr. (August 15, 1939 – November 21, 2024) was an American librarian, library historian, and educator. He worked at the University of Texas at Austin School of Information from 1971 to 2005.

Donald G. Davis, Jr. was born on August 15, 1939 in San Marcos, Texas, the son of Baptist pastor Donald Gordon Davis, Sr. and Ethel Dorothy Henning Davis. He graduated from Belmont High School in Los Angeles in 1957. Davis earned a BA in history from the University of California, Los Angeles in 1961, master's degrees in history and library science from the University of California, Berkeley in 1963 and 1964, a PhD in library science from the University of Illinois Urbana-Champaign in 1972, and a master's degree in theological studies from Austin Presbyterian Theological Seminary in 1996.

In 1971, he became a faculty member at the University of Texas at Austin School of Information until his retirement in 2005. He served as associate dean from 2000 to 2002. Davis was editor of the academic journal Information & Culture from 1976 to 2004. He authored and co-authored a number of significant reference works in library science: American Library History: A Comprehensive Guide to the Literature (with John Mark Tucker, 1989), the Encyclopedia of Library History (with Wayne A. Wiegand, 1994), and the Dictionary of American Library Biography, Second Supplement (2003).

Donald G. Davis, Jr. died on 21 November 2024.

== Personal life ==
In 1969, he married Avis Jane Higdon and they would have three children. In 1977, they purchased the historic Oliphant-Walker House in Austin, Texas.
