= Louisiana State University Press =

Academic publisher

- Founded: 1935; 91 years ago
- Country of origin: United States
- Headquarters location: Baton Rouge, Louisiana
- Distribution: Longleaf Services (US); Scholarly Book Services (Canada)
- Key people: Alisa Plant, director
- Publication types: books, magazines
- Official website: www.lsupress.org

The Louisiana State University Press (LSU Press) is a university press at Louisiana State University. Founded in 1935, it publishes works of scholarship as well as general interest books. LSU Press is a member of the Association of University Presses.

LSU Press publishes approximately 70 new books each year and has a backlist of over 2000 titles. Primary fields of publication include southern history, southern literary studies, Louisiana and the Gulf South, the American Civil War and military history, roots music, southern culture, environmental studies, European history, foodways, poetry, fiction, media studies, and landscape architecture. In 2010, LSU Press merged with The Southern Review, LSU's literary magazine, and the company now oversees the operations of this publication.

Domestic distribution for the press is currently provided by the University of North Carolina Press's Longleaf Services.

== Notable publications and awards ==
A Confederacy of Dunces by John Kennedy Toole was published in 1980 and won the 1981 Pulitzer Prize for Fiction.

Three titles have won the Pulitzer Prize for Poetry: The Flying Change by Henry S. Taylor (1986), Alive Together: New and Selected Poems by Lisel Mueller (1997), and Late Wife by Claudia Emerson (2006).

Lisel Mueller's 1981 The Need to Hold Still won the National Book Award for Poetry that year.

Wayne A. Wiegand and Shirley A. Wiegand- The Desegregation of Public Libraries in the Jim Crow South: Civil Rights and Local Activism won the 2019 Eliza Atkins Gleason Book Award from the Library History Round Table.

Kelby Ouchley received the John Burroughs Medal for natural history writing in 2023 for Bayou D’Arbonne Swamp: A Naturalist's Memoir of Place.

Gregg Andrews' Shantyboats and Roustabouts: The River Poor of St. Louis, 1875-1930 published in 2023 won the category of U.S. Maritime History at the John Lyman Book Awards.

== Awards Given ==
In honor of the longtime director of the press Les Phillabaum, who acquired several of the prizewinning books, and his long commitment to poetry publishing, the press established the L.E. Phillabaum Poetry Award in 2005.

== See also ==
- List of English-language book publishing companies
- List of university presses
