= Andrew Dillon =

Andrew Dillon may refer to:

- Andrew Dillon (health administrator) (born 1954), administrator and manager in the British health service
- Andrew Dillon (sports administrator) (fl. 1990s–2020s), Australian chief executive officer of the Australian Football League
- Andrew Dillon (professor) (fl. 2000s–2020s), professor of psychology at the University of Texas at Austin School of Information
- Andrew Dillon (producer) (fl. 2020s), Indigenous Australian filmmaker, co-writer and producer of upcoming film First Warrior
- Andy Dillon (born 1962), Democratic Party politician from the U.S. state of Michigan
