= David B. Gracy II =

American archivist and archival educator (1941–2020)

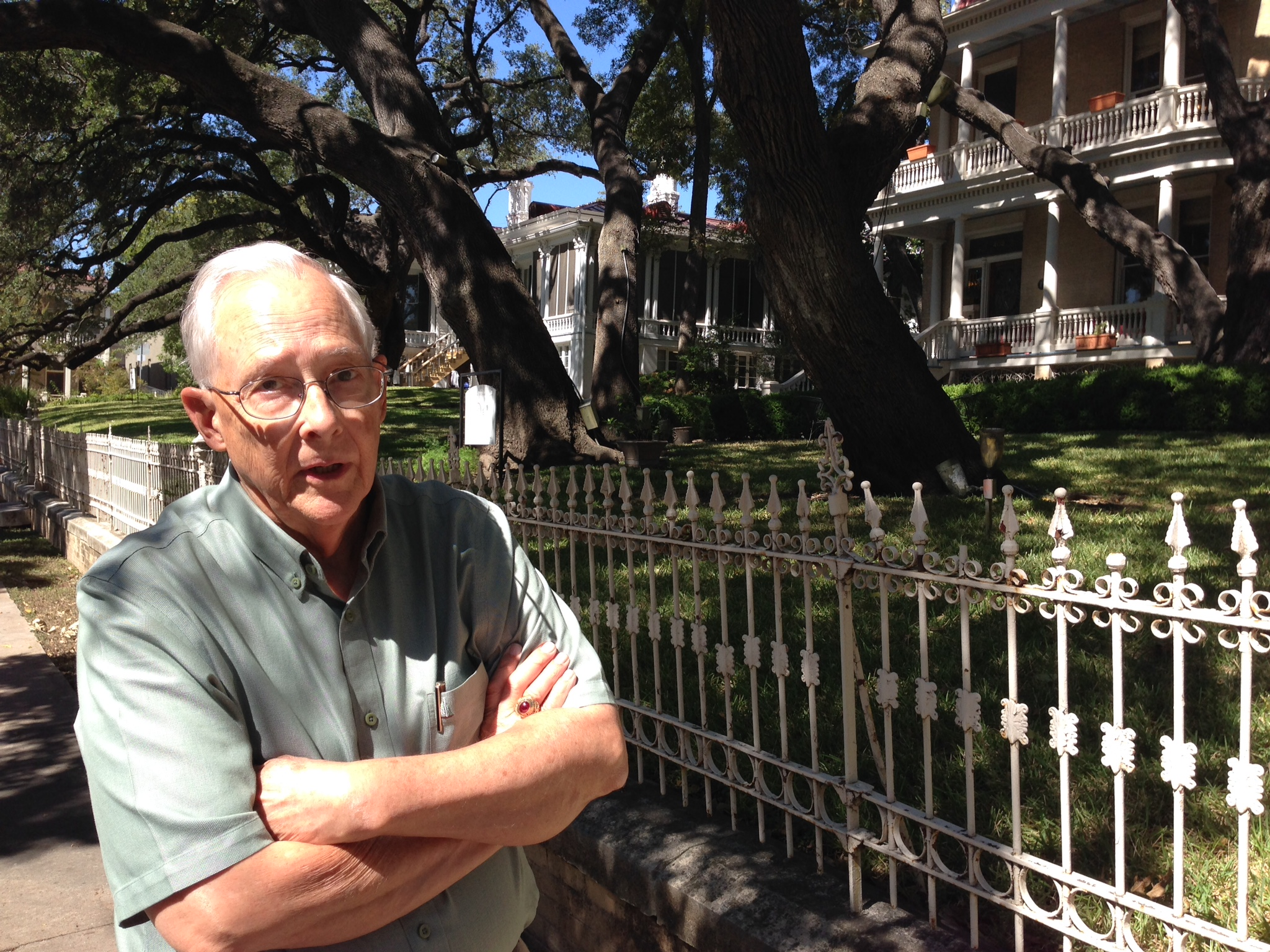
- David B. Gracy II, Austin, Texas, October 2015
- Born: 25 October 1941; Austin, Texas, US
- Died: 26 September 2020 (aged 78); Austin, Texas, US
- Education: University of Texas at Austin, University of Texas at Austin, Texas Tech University
- Occupations: Archivist, Professor
- Organization: University of Texas at Austin (USA)
- Known for: Governor Bill Daniel Professor in Archival Enterprise; Archives and Manuscripts: Arrangement and Description

David B. Gracy II (born 25 October 1941 – 26 September 2020) was an American archivist and archival educator. He developed the Southern Labor Archives, was a founding member of the Society of Georgia Archivists, and authored the first American manual on arrangement and description for the Society of American Archivists. He was an early leader in archival education and professional certification for archivists and has advocated for archivists to promote societal understanding of archives and in particular the archival profession throughout his career. He also contributed significantly to the preservation and celebration of Texas history.

== Early life ==
David B. Gracy II was born on October 25, 1941, to David Caldwell and Alice Tillar (née Duggan) Gracy in Austin, Texas. Gracy's father was a graduate from the University of Texas at Austin who was a principal of the Gracy Title Company of Austin, while his mother was descended from the Littlefield family, the largest benefactor to the university during its early years. Littlefield House, built in 1893 for Gracy's ancestor George Washington Littlefield, a successful businessman in both banking and cattle trades, still stands on the campus of the University of Texas at Austin.

== Education ==
Gracy attended the Sewanee Military Academy in Sewanee, Tennessee. He then attended the University of Texas at Austin receiving a Bachelor's degree in History in 1963. He followed that with a Master's degree in History from the University of Texas at Austin in 1966 and a Ph.D in History from Texas Tech University in 1971.

== Career ==
David Gracy began his career as Archivist for the Southwest Collection at Texas Tech University from 1966 to 1971 before becoming Archivist of the Southern Labor Archives and University Archives at Georgia State University from 1971 to 1977. During his time in Georgia he employed a grant from the National Historical Publications and Records Commission to develop a media program on the importance of archives to the state's citizens, which would become a model for his later work with the Society of American Archivists.

Gracy became Director of the Texas State Archives in 1977 until 1986 when he was asked to create the archival and records enterprise concentration at the University of Texas at Austin School of Information. He remained as the Governor Bill Daniel Professor in Archival Enterprise at the School until 2011 when he assumed an emeritus position.

Gracy spent many years developing journal resources on archival science and information studies. He was founding editor of Georgia Archive (now Provenance ) from 1972 to 1976, which was the first professional archival journal published by a state or regional organization. The journal received an Award of Merit from the Society of American archivists in 1975. This was followed by a position on the editorial board from 1977 – 1978. The Society of Georgia Archivists named an award in his honour which recognizes a superior contribution to each issue of Provenance. Gracy was also on the editorial board of the journal of the Society of American Archivists, American Archivist, from 1976 to 1979.

Gracy was on the editorial board of the journal Libraries & Culture from 1985 to 2005, whereupon he became editor of the journal, renamed Libraries & the Cultural Record (now Information & Culture: A Journal of History), from 2005 to 2011. He then joined the Board of Advisory Editors.

Gracy was made a Distinguished Fellow of the Society of American Archivists in 1979, as well as a Fellow of the Society of Georgia Archivists in 2009, and received the ACA Distinguished Service Award from the Academy of Certified Archivists in 2011. He was also named a Fellow of the Texas State Historical Association in 1992. He was the first person awarded the recognition of distinguished alumnus, Department of History, Texas Tech University, in 1987. He received the San Jacinto Award for distinguished service to Texas history in 1993 as well as the Katherine Drake Hart history preservation award from the Austin History Center Association, in 2005.

== Influence ==
Gracy was President of both the Society of American Archivists (1983–84) and the Academy of Certified Archivists (1999–2000). As President of the Society of American Archivists, he initiated the "Archives in Society" program, which focused on the value, relevance and significance of archives and archivists to all members of society. He created the Task Force on Archives and Society in 1983, which commissioned a social marketing study of the image of archives and archivists by resource allocators popularly known as the "Levy Report". In 1989 he joined with others to found the Academy of Certified Archivists, serving as Regent responsible for outreach to professional archivists. A Festschrift in honour of David Gracy was published discussing his influence on archives and archivists, particularly in the United States. In the introduction the editor noted that Gracy's career "evinced innumerable critical contributions to advancing the archives field in the United States."

== Principal publications ==
Books

- Gracy II, David B. (1968). Littlefield Lands: Colonization on the Texas Plains, 1912-1920. Austin: University of Texas Press. ISBN 978-1477302637.
- Gracy II, David B. (1977). Archives and Manuscripts: Arrangement and Description. Chicago: Society of American Archivists. ISBN 978-0931828072.
- Gracy II, David B. (1987). Moses Austin: His Life. San Antonio: Trinity University Press. ISBN 978-0292751200.
- Gracy II, David B. (2010). The State Library and Archives of Texas: A History, 1835 – 1962. Austin: University Of Texas Press. ISBN 978-0-292-72896-7.
- Gracy II, David B. (2010). Sunrise! Governor Bill Daniel and the Second Liberation of Guam. Hillsboro, TX: Hill College Press. ISBN 978-0912172002.
- Gracy II, David B. (2019). A Man Absolutely Sure of Himself: Texan George Washington Littlefield. Norman, Oklahoma: University of Oklahoma Press. ISBN 978-0-8061-6433-5.

Articles

- Gracy II, David B. (1985). "Our future is now". American Archivist. 48: 12–21. doi:10.17723/aarc.48.1.4p700782677307t3.
- Gracy II, David B. (1985). "What's your Totem? Archival images in the public mind". Midwestern Archivist. 24 (1): 17–21.
- Gracy II, David B. (1987). "Is there a future in the use of archives?". Archivaria. 24: 3–9.
- Gracy II, David B. (1989). "Archivists: you are what people think you keep". American Archivist. 52: 72–78. doi:10.17723/aarc.52.1.73j6730385023k87.
- Gracy II, David B. (1994). "Columbus revisited: the status of archival research around the world in 1992". Archivum. 39: 520–25.
- Gracy II, David B. (1997). "Reference no longer is a 'P' word: the reference archivist as marketer". The Reference Librarian. 26: 171–84. doi:10.1300/J120v26n56_13.
- Gracy II, David B. (1997). "Is teaching all that there is to it? Archival educators and advocacy". Janus. 1: 42–50.
