= Robert S. Martin =

American librarian, archivist, administrator and educator

Robert Sidney Martin (born 1949) is an American librarian, archivist, administrator, and educator. He is Professor Emeritus, School of Library and Information Studies, Texas Woman’s University, where he was the Lillian M. Bradshaw Endowed Chair until his retirement in 2008.

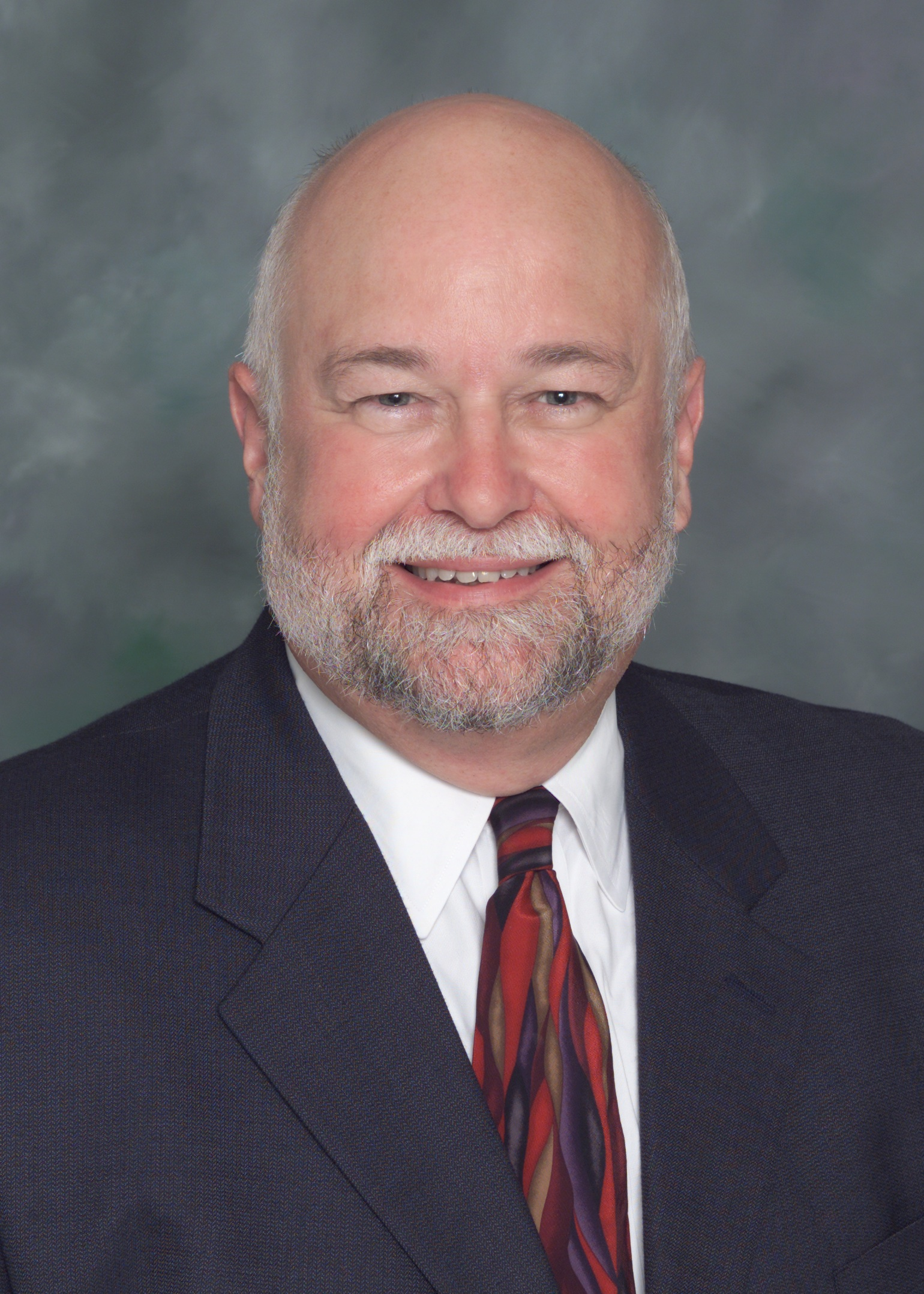
Robert S. Martin as Director of the Institute of Museum and Library Services.

From 2001 to 2005, Martin was the director of the Institute of Museum and Library Services (IMLS), and he served concurrently as the acting chair of the National Endowment for the Arts from Oct. 2001 to Jan. 2002. He has served on numerous boards and commissions, including the National Council for the Humanities, the U.S. National Commission for UNESCO, and the President's Committee on the Arts and Humanities.

On November 17, 2008, President George W. Bush awarded Martin the Presidential Citizens Medal “for his leadership in strengthening libraries and museums across the country.” The medal is the second-highest civilian award in the United States, second only to the Presidential Medal of Freedom. Martin is a Fellow of the Society of American Archivists and a Distinguished Alumnus of Rice University and the UNC School of Information and Library Science (SILS).

America's libraries are the fruits of a great democracy. They exist because we believe that memory and truth are important. They exist because we believe that information and knowledge are not the exclusive domain of a certain type or class of person, but rather the province of all who seek to learn. A democratic society holds these institutions in high regard.

— Dr. Robert S. Martin at a House Subcommittee hearing on education.

== Education ==
Doctor of Philosophy, Library Science, University of North Carolina at Chapel Hill, 1988

Master of Library Science, University of North Texas, 1979

Bachelor of Arts, History, Rice University, 1971

== Career ==
From 1972 to 1976 Martin was an Archives Assistant in the Barker Texas History Center at the University of Texas at Austin, where he developed an interest in the cartographic history of Texas and the Southwest. In 1977 he was appointed Research Associate in the library at the University of Texas at Arlington’s budding Cartographic History Collection. From 1979 to 1980 he served as Director of Special Collections at the University of Texas at Arlington.

From 1980 to 1983 he was a student in the Doctoral program of the School of Information and Library Science at the University of North Carolina at Chapel Hill. In December 1983 he was appointed Lecturer at the School of Library and Information Studies at the University of Wisconsin-Madison. In January 1985 he became Associate Dean for Special Collections in the library at Louisiana State University. During that period he also served as adjunct professor in the LSU School of Library and Information Science.

In June 1995 Martin was appointed Director and Librarian of the Texas State Library and Archives Commission. During his tenure he oversaw the expansion of the TexShare resource sharing program, coordinated the development of new school library standards for the state, fostered the participation of libraries in the Telecommunication Infrastructure Fund, and assisted First Lady Laura Bush in the establishment of the Texas Book Festival.

In 1999 Martin was appointed professor in the School of Library and Information Studies at Texas Woman’s University. From September 2000 to July 2001 he served as Interim Director of the School.

In 2001, Martin was nominated by President George W. Bush to lead the Institute of Museum and Library Services (IMLS.) Martin was confirmed unanimously by the U.S. Senate, becoming the first librarian to serve in this role.

2002 White House Conference on School Libraries
- https://www.c-span.org/video/?170381-1/conference-school-libraries

During his tenure, IMLS launched the Laura Bush 21st Century Librarian Program (LB21), which awards grants to enhance the training and professional development of library and archives professionals, develop faculty and library leaders, and recruit and educate the next generation of library and archives professionals. LB21’s overarching goal is to support the development of a diverse workforce of librarians to better meet the changing learning and information needs of the American public. In 2002, at the invitation of Mrs. Bush, Martin presided over the White House Conference on School Libraries. Martin also oversaw the establishment of the Museums for America program, which supports projects that strengthen the ability of an individual museum to serve its public.

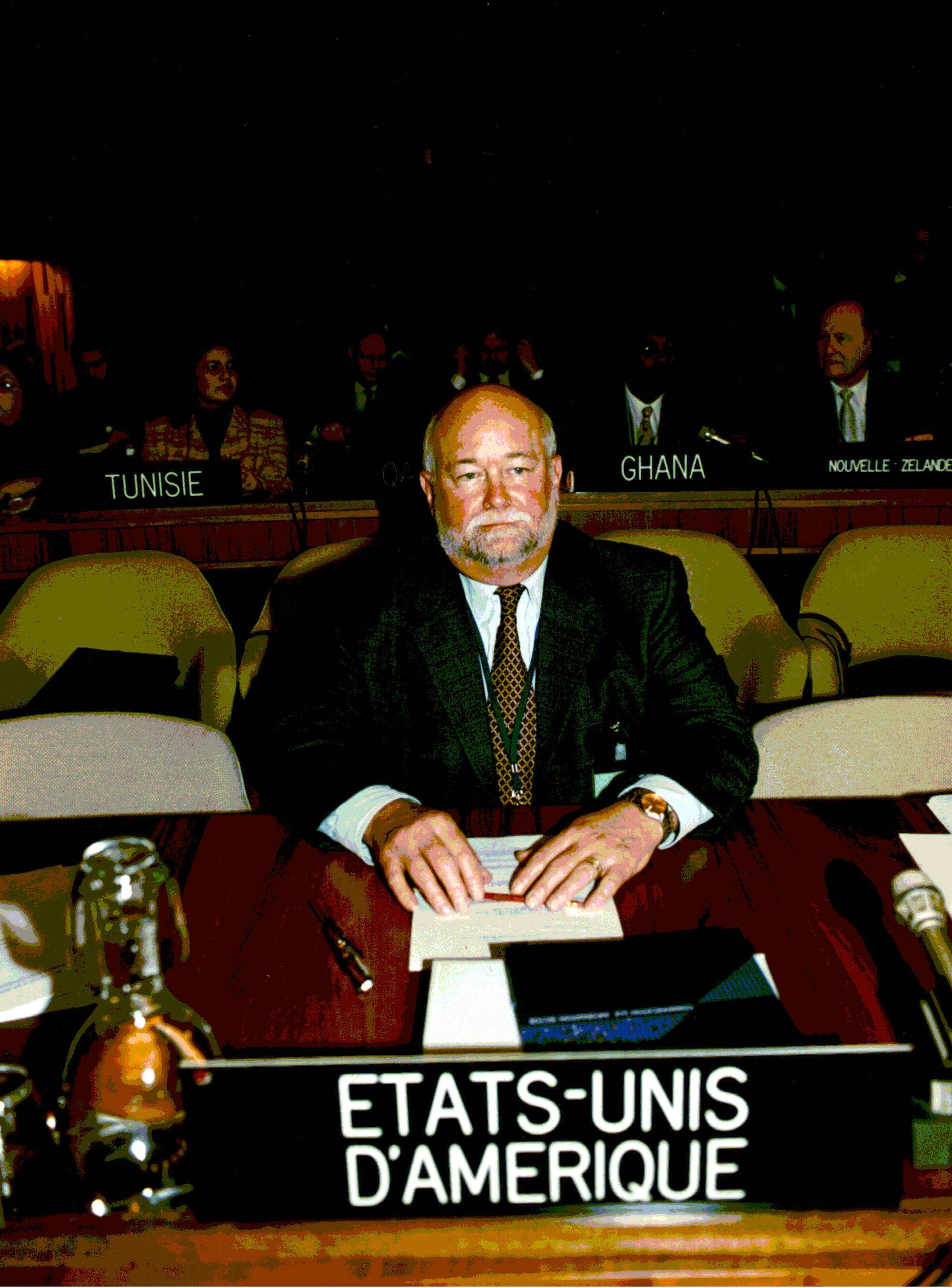
IMLS Director Robert S. Martin shares his vision of the role of library, archives, and museums in an inclusive knowledge society at UNESCO Headquarters in Paris on October 10, 2003.

Martin was a member of the U.S. Delegation to the UNESCO General Conferences in Paris in 2003, 2005 and 2007. In 2003 he participated in a Ministerial Roundtable "Toward Knowledge Societies" and served on a working group that drafted the ministerial communiqué issued by the Round Table in preparation for the World Summit on the Information Society (WSIS). He subsequently was a member of the U. S. Delegation to WSIS in Geneva, Switzerland in December 2003. In 2004 and 2005 he served as co-head of the U.S. Delegation to the UNESCO Intergovernmental Meetings on Cultural Diversity. In 2004 he was the head of the U.S. Delegation to the Organization of American States Intergovernmental Meeting of Ministers of Culture and Highest Appropriate Authorities in Mexico City. From 2003 through 2008 he served as a member of the U. S. National Commission on UNESCO, and was a member of its executive committee. From 2008 through 2011 he served as a member and chairman of the National Archives and Records Administration's Advisory Committee on the Electronic Records Archives (ACERA).

In accordance with legislation governing IMLS, Martin’s term as director concluded after four years in 2005. He returned to Texas Woman’s University as the Lillian Bradshaw Endowed Chair in the School of Library and Information Studies. He discussed the development and future of the Institute of Museum and Library Services in an interview with Library Journal editor, John N. Berry He retired from TWU in August 2008 and was conferred Professor Emeritus.

In November, 2008, he was appointed by the Archivist of the United States to serve as chair of the Advisory Committee on the Electronic Records Archives.

Throughout his career, Martin held elected and appointed positions in numerous professional organizations, including the American Library Association, Association for Library and Information Science Education, Chief Officers of State Library Agencies, Louisiana Archives and Manuscripts Association, National Association of Governments Archivists and Records Administrators, Society of American Archivists, Society of Southwest Archivists, Urban Libraries Council, and the Texas Map Society.

== Honors ==
Martin’s most prestigious honor came unexpectedly at the ceremonial presentation of the 2008 National Medals of Arts and National Humanities Medals, which both President George W. Bush and First Lady Laura Bush attended. After the conclusion of the anticipated program, President Bush surprised attendees by awarding the Presidential Citizens Medal to four outstanding leaders in the arts, including Martin.

External videos
- 2008 National Medals of Arts and Humanities Awards Ceremony

President Bush praised Martin for helping to “preserve our treasured collections and bring libraries and museums into the 21st century with new technology.” In his commendation, Martin was hailed as someone who had “dedicated his career to the management of libraries. As a librarian, archivist, administrator, and educator, he has demonstrated a strong commitment to lifelong learning. The United States honors Robert Martin for his leadership in strengthening libraries and museums across the country.”

=== Most notable honors and awards ===
Presidential Citizens Medal

Distinguished Alumnus, Rice University

Fellow of the Society of American Archivists

Lifetime Achievement Award, Department of Library and Information Sciences, University of North Texas

Doctor of Humane Letter Honoris Causa, Dominican University

Alice G. Smith Lecture 10th Anniversary Lecture: “Libraries and the Twenty-first Century.” University of South Florida School of Information, 2002.

Council Exemplary Service Award, Society of American Archivists

Distinguished Service Award, Texas Library Association

Distinguished Alumnus, UNC School of Information and Library Science

Distinguished Service Award, Society of Southwest Archivists

Justin Winsor Prize, Library History Round Table, American Library Association, 1983. "Maurice F. Tauber's Louis Round Wilson: An Analysis of a Collaboration."

== Publications ==
=== Books ===
- With Barbara Blake and Yunfei Du, Successful Community Outreach: A How-To-Do-It Manual for Librarians (New York: Neal-Schuman, 2011). ISBN 978-1-55570-772-9
- With James C. Martin, Maps of Texas and the Southwest, 1513‑1900 (Austin: Texas State Historical Association, 1999.) ISBN 0-87611-169-X (Originally published: Albuquerque: University of New Mexico Press, 1984).
- 30 Years of Friendship (Baton Rouge: LSU Libraries 1992).
- With James C. Martin, Contours of Discovery: Printed Maps Delineating the Texas and Southwestern Chapters of the Cartographic History of North America, 1513‑1930 (Austin: Texas State Historical Association, 1982). ISBN 0-87611-058-8

=== Books edited ===
- The Impact of Outsourcing and Privatization on Library Services and Management (Chicago: American Library Association, 2000). (Available at http://www.ala.org/alaorg/ors/outsourcing/)
- With Delmus E. Williams, John M. Budd, Barbara Moran and Fred Roper, For the Good of the Order: Essays in Honor of Edward G. Holley (Greenwich, CT: JAI Press, 1994). ISBN 978-1559387521
- Carnegie Denied: Communities Rejecting Carnegie Library Construction Grants, 1898-1925 (Westport, CT: Greenwood Press, 1993). ISBN 0-313-28609-4
- Scholarly Communication in an Electronic Environment: Issues for Research Libraries (Chicago: Association of College and Research Libraries, 1993). ISBN 0-8389-7686-7

He has authored numerous refereed and invited articles in annuals and journals including Advances in Librarianship, Texas Library Journal, Library Hi Tech, Libraries and Culture, American Archivist, Rare Books and Manuscripts Librarianship, Journal of Education for Library and Information Science, North Carolina Libraries, Journal of Library History, and Southwestern Historical Quarterly. His Opening Remarks at the 21st Century Learners Conference in 2001 established the IMLS commitment to lifelong learning.

Dissertation: Martin, Robert Sidney. Louis Round Wilson at the University of North Carolina, 1901-1932. Chapel Hill, NC: The University of North Carolina at Chapel Hill, 1988. 805p. Advisor: Edward G. Holley.

== Personal ==
Known as "Bob" Martin to friends and many colleagues. Married to Barbara Stein Martin, Professor Emeritus, College of Information, University of North Texas.
