= Litwin Books =

American academic publisher

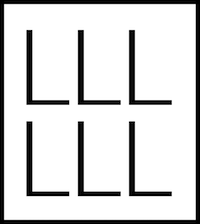
- Founded: 2006
- Founder: Rory Litwin
- Country of origin: United States
- Headquarters location: Sacramento, California
- Imprints: Library Juice Press
- Official website: www.litwinbooks.com

Litwin Books, LLC is an academic publisher founded in 2006 under the name Library Juice Press. Library Juice Press became an imprint of the new parent company, Litwin Books, LLC in 2008. The Litwin Books imprint publishes books on archival studies topics, library history, communication studies, and related fields. The Library Juice Press imprint publishes books on library and information science topics, usually with an emphasis on critical theory or political aspects of the field. The company has its origins in an email news and comment distribution service called Library Juice, founded by Rory Litwin in 1998. In 2005, the Library Juice news service became a blog, which now supports the company's publishing projects and other activities. In an interview with Barbara Fister for Inside Higher Education Litwin, interested in the continuity of the knowledge base of librarianship, described the publisher's role as initiating projects and working collaboratively with authors. In 2016, Library Juice Press was awarded the Eli M. Oboler Memorial Award by the Intellectual Freedom Round Table of the American Library Association for its publication, The Library Juice Press Handbook of Intellectual Freedom: Cases, Concepts, and Theories.

== Library Juice Academy ==
In 2012, the company initiated a continuing education venture called Library Juice Academy, which offers online professional development courses for librarians and other people in library and information science fields of work.

== Grants and awards ==
Litwin Books and Library Juice Press give a number of annual grants and awards. Litwin Books gives a $1000 award for Ongoing Doctoral Dissertation Research in the Philosophy of Information. Library Juice Press holds an annual paper contest, also with a $1000 award, honoring a published paper within the publisher's editorial scope that is not primarily an empirical study. Library Juice Academy sponsors the ACRL University Libraries Section Outstanding Professional Award and the Frank B. Sessa Scholarships for Continuing Professional Education of Beta Phi Mu Members. Library Juice Press and Library Juice Academy jointly sponsored the mid-career fellowship awarded by the Digital Library Federation. In 2018 the Alexandre Vattemare Award was established to honor contributions in the LIS field marked by originality, creative energy and novel combinations of ideas.

== Other Activities ==
Litwin Books sponsors and organizes conferences and colloquia on topics within its scope of interest, including libraries and archives in the anthropocene and gender and sexuality in information studies.
