= Louise S. Robbins =

American historian

Louise S. Robbins is an American academic and formerly director of the University of Wisconsin–Madison School of Library and Information Studies.

Robbins has won awards for her articles and books dealing with the history of librarians and intellectual freedom in the United States. Her best-known work is The Dismissal of Miss Ruth Brown: Civil Rights, Censorship, and the American Library. winner of the Eliza Atkins Gleason Book Award from the Library History Round Table of the American Library Association. She was honored with the Willa Literary Award for a nonfiction book from Women Writing the West.

Before moving to Madison, Wisconsin, Robbins was a long-time resident of Ada, Oklahoma, where she became the first female city council person and then the first female mayor.

Robbins was named Wisconsin Librarian of the Year in 2001 by the Wisconsin Library Association.

On the occasion of the Oklahoma Library Association Centennial in 2007, she was named one of the state's 100 Library Legends (living or dead).
