= Information history =

Academic discipline

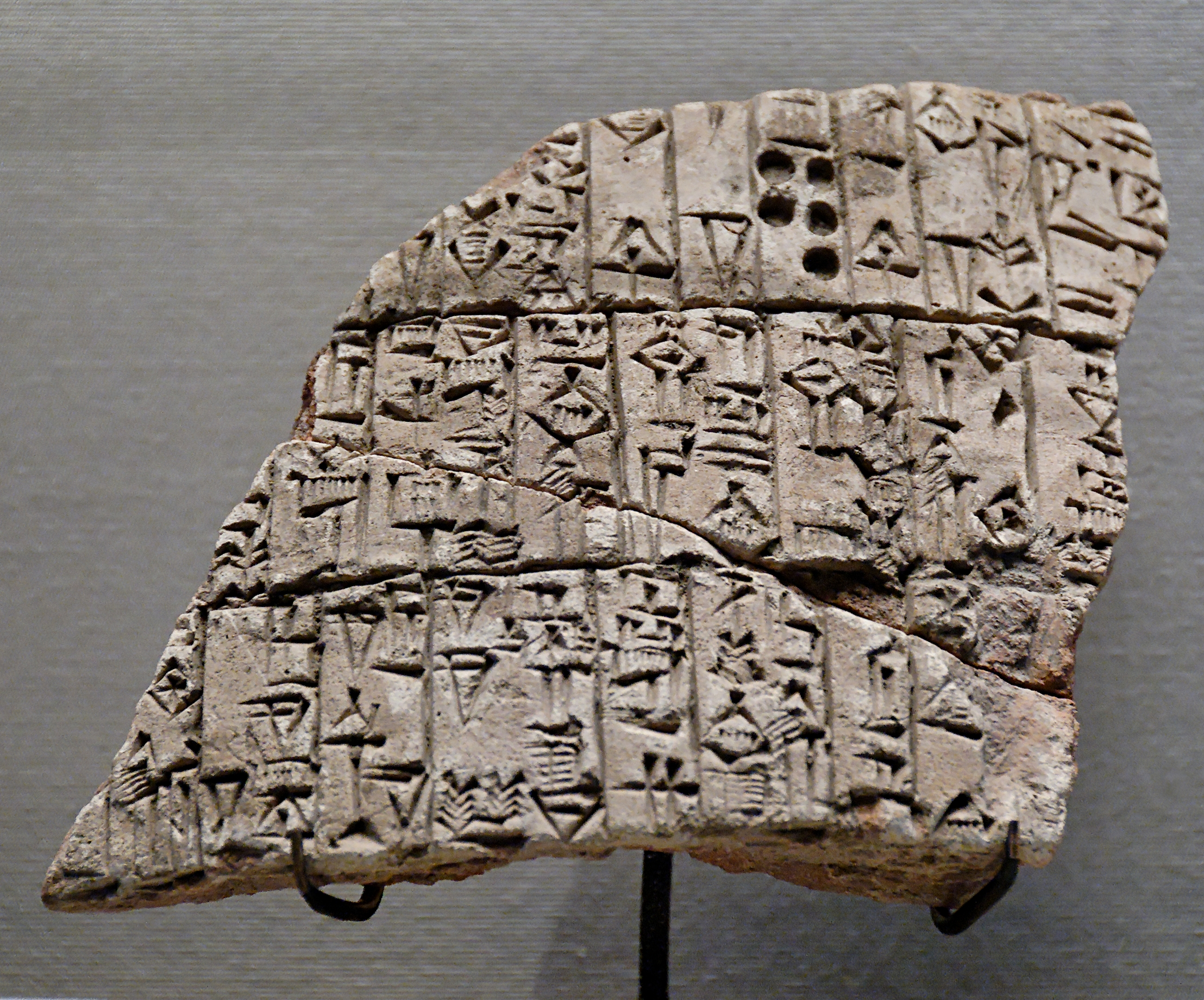
Fragment of an inscripted clay cone of Urukagina

Information history may refer to the history of each of the categories listed below (or to combinations of them). It should be recognized that the understanding of, for example, libraries as information systems only goes back to about 1950. The application of the term information for earlier systems or societies is a retronym.

== Academic discipline ==
Information history is an emerging discipline related to, but broader than, library history. An important introduction and review was made by Alistair Black (2006). A prolific scholar in this field is also Toni Weller, for example, Weller (2007, 2008, 2010a and 2010b). As part of her work Toni Weller has argued that there are important links between the modern information age and its historical precedents. A description from Russia is Volodin (2000).

Alistair Black (2006, p. 445) wrote: "This chapter explores issues of discipline definition and legitimacy by segmenting information history into its various components:

- The history of print and written culture, including relatively long-established areas such as the histories of libraries and librarianship, book history, publishing history, and the history of reading.
- The history of more recent information disciplines and practice, that is to say, the history of information management, information systems, and information science.
- The history of contiguous areas, such as the history of the information society and information infrastructure, necessarily enveloping communication history (including telecommunications history) and the history of information policy.
- The history of information as social history, with emphasis on the importance of informal information networks."

"Bodies influential in the field include the American Library Association’s Round Table on Library History, the Library History Section of the International Federation of Library Associations and Institutions (IFLA), and, in the U.K., the Library and Information History Group of the Chartered Institute of Library and Information Professionals (CILIP). Each of these bodies has been busy in recent years, running conferences and seminars, and initiating scholarly projects. Active library history groups function in many other countries, including Germany (The Wolfenbuttel Round Table on Library History, the History of the Book and the History of Media, located at the Herzog August Bibliothek), Denmark (The Danish Society for Library History, located at the Royal School of Library and Information Science), Finland (The Library History Research Group, University of Tamepere), and Norway (The Norwegian Society for Book and Library History). Sweden has no official group dedicated to the subject, but interest is generated by the existence of a museum of librarianship in Bods, established by the Library Museum Society and directed by Magnus Torstensson. Activity in Argentina, where, as in Europe and the U.S., a "new library history" has developed, is described by Parada (2004)." (Black (2006, p. 447).

=== Journals ===
- Information & Culture (previously Libraries & the Cultural Record, Libraries & Culture)
- Library & Information History (until 2008: Library History; until 1967: Library Association. Library History Group. Newsletter)

== Information technology (IT) ==
The term IT is ambiguous although mostly synonym with computer technology. Haigh (2011, pp. 432-433) wrote

"In fact, the great majority of references to information technology have always been concerned with computers, although the exact meaning has shifted over time (Kline, 2006). The phrase received its first prominent usage in a Harvard Business Review article (Haigh, 2001b; Leavitt & Whisler, 1958) intended to promote a technocratic vision for the future of business management. Its initial definition was at the conjunction of computers, operations research methods, and simulation techniques. Having failed initially to gain much traction (unlike related terms of a similar vintage such as information systems, information processing, and information science) it was revived in policy and economic circles in the 1970s with a new meaning. Information technology now described the expected convergence of the computing, media, and telecommunications industries (and their technologies), understood within the broader context of a wave of enthusiasm for the computer revolution, post-industrial society, information society (Webster, 1995), and other fashionable expressions of the belief that new electronic technologies were bringing a profound rupture with the past. As it spread broadly during the 1980s, IT increasingly lost its association with communications (and, alas, any vestigial connection to the idea of anybody actually being informed of anything) to become a new and more pretentious way of saying "computer". The final step in this process is the recent surge in references to "information and communication technologies" or ICTs, a coinage that makes sense only if one assumes that a technology can inform without communicating".

Some people use the term information technology about technologies used before the development of the computer. This is however to use the term as a retronym.

=== See also ===
- History of computer and video games
- History of computing hardware (1960s-present)
- History of computing hardware
- History of operating systems
- History of software engineering
- History of programming languages
- History of artificial intelligence
- History of the graphical user interface
- History of the Internet
- History of the World Wide Web
- IT History Society
- Timeline of computing

== Information society ==
"It is said that we live in an "Age of Information," but it is an open scandal that there is no theory, nor even definition, of information that is both broad and precise enough to make such an assertion meaningful." (Goguen, 1997).

The Danish Internet researcher Niels Ole Finnemann (2001) developed a general history of media. He wrote: "A society cannot exist in which the production and exchange of information are of only minor significance. For this reason one cannot compare industrial societies to information societies in any consistent way. Industrial societies are necessarily also information societies, and information societies may also be industrial societies." He suggested the following media matrix:

1. Oral cultures based mainly on speech.
2. Literate cultures: speech + writing (primary alphabets and number systems).
3. Print cultures: speech + written texts + print.
4. Mass-media cultures: speech + written texts + print + analogue electric media.
5. Second-order alphabetic cultures: speech + written texts + print + analogue electric media + digital media.

== Information science ==
Many information science historians cite Paul Otlet and Henri La Fontaine as the fathers of information science with the founding of the International Institute of Bibliography (IIB) in 1895 Institutionally, information science emerged in the last part of the 19th century as documentation science which in general shifted name to information science in the 1960s.

Heting Chu (2010) classified the history and development of information representation and retrieval (IRR) in four phases. "The history of IRR is not long. A retrospective look at the field identifies increased demand, rapid growth, the demystification phase, and the networked era as the four major stages IRR has experienced in its development:"

1. Increased Demand (1940s–early 1950s) (Information explosion)
2. Rapid Growth (1950s–1980s) (the emergence of computers and systems such as Dialog (online database))
3. Demystification Phase (1980s–1990s) (systems developed for end-user searching)
4. The Networked Era (1990s–Present) (search engines such as AltaVista and Google)
