= Library History Round Table =

American library history organization

The United States-based Library History Round Table (LHRT) encourages research and publication on library history and promotes awareness and discussion of historical issues in librarianship. It "exists to facilitate communication among scholars and students of library history, to support research in library history, and to be active in issues, such as preservation, that concern library historians." It is part of the American Library Association.

Louis Shores and Wayne Shirley were instrumental in founding the Library History Round Table in 1947.

In 1998, in celebration of LHRT’s fiftieth anniversary, Andrew B. Wertheimer and John David Marshall compiled a chronology of the round table’s activities covering 1947 to 1997. In 2023, in celebration of LHRT’s seventy-fifth anniversary, Bernadette A. Lear compiled a chronology from 1998-2023.

The American Library Association archives were established with input and support by the Library History Round Table as recounted by archivist Maynard J. Brichford.

== Publications ==
The Library History Round Table's official peer-reviewed journal is Libraries: Culture, History, and Society.

LHRT News and Notes is the blog of the Library History Round Table.

== Library History Seminars ==
The Library History Seminars were established in 1961 by the Library History Round Table. The Library History Seminars are held approximately every five years and have been published in various outlets: separate proceedings, An American Library History Reader, in the Journal of Library History, and in the journal, Libraries & Culture.

Library History Seminars
No.	Title	Date	Location
I	In Pursuit of Library History:Seminar 1, Proceedings	November 2–4, 1961	Florida State University, Tallahassee
II	Approaches to Library History	1965	Florida State University, Tallahassee
III	Library History Seminar No. 3	February 8–10, 1968	Florida State University, Tallahassee
IV	Library History Seminar, 1971	1971	Florida State University, Tallahassee
V	Milestones to the Present.	1976	Philadelphia
VI	Libraries & Culture	March 19–22, 1980	Austin, Texas
VII	Libraries, Books, & Culture	March 6–8, 1985	Chapel Hill, North Carolina
VIII	Reading & Libraries	May 9–11, 1990	Indiana University, Bloomington
IX	Libraries & Philanthropy	March 30–April 1, 1995	University of Alabama, Tuscaloosa
X	National Libraries of the World: Interpreting the Past, Shaping the Future.	October 23–26, 2000	Library of Congress
XI	Libraries in Times of War, Revolution and Social Change.	October 27–30, 2005	University of Illinois at Urbana-Champaign
XII	Libraries in the History of Print Culture.	September 10–12, 2010	Madison, Wisconsin
XIII	Libraries: Traditions and Innovations	July 31–August 2, 2015	Simmons College, Boston
XIV	Libraries Without Borders	June 10–12, 2021	Virtual

The Library History Seminar XV will be held December 3-5, 2026.The topic will be “A History of Modern Libraries, Warts and All: Development, Organization, and Transformation.”

== Edward G. Holley Lecture ==
The Edward G. Holley Memorial Lecture, established in memory of Holley is held at the American Library Association Conference. The endowment fundraising for the lecture began with contribution of royalties by Wayne Wiegand from his book, Irrepressible Reformer: A Biography of Melvil Dewey.

The inaugural lecture was given in 2006 by John Y. Cole, Director of the Center for the Book at the Library of Congress and Jane Aikin, Senior Academic Adviser at the National Endowment for the Humanities.

Date	Lecturer	Title of Lecture
2025	George Boudreau	"Complicating the Past: Historic Sites Interpretation and the Challenges of a More Accurate History."
2024	Jorge Leal	"Rock Archivo de LÁ, the Online Archive of Southern California’s Latinx Youth and Musical Cultures."
2023	Rebecca Romney	"Cultural Memory, Community Work: Why Every Librarian Should Care About Rare Books."
2022	Kurt Hackemer	"Animated Cartoon Shorts and American Perceptions of World War II."
2021	Venkat Mani	“Publics and Their Reading Publics: A Pact with Books.”
2020	Lisa Tetrault	“The Fight by Remembering: The Making of a Suffrage Archive.”
2019	Dawn Logsdon and Lucie Faulknor	“Through the Looking Glass: The Wonderland of Archival Footage.”
2018	Mary Niall Mitchell.	"Girls in a Frame: Enslaved People, Their Stories, and the Archives in a Digital Age."
2017	Kathy Peiss	“American Librarians and the Collecting Missions of World War II."
2016	John Cech	“History, Childhood, Memory, and Imagination."
2015	Ezra Greenspan	"Where do the Lives of Individuals, Books and Serials, Archives, and Libraries Intersect?"
2014	Thomas Augst	“The Business of Lectures: An Itinerant History of Public Culture in Nineteenth-Century America.”
2013	Jacob Soll	“Library of Power, Library of Enlightenment: Libraries as Foundations of the Modern State 1400–1800.”
2012	Abigail Van Slyck	"Thinking Globally about Carnegie Libraries."
2011	Sarah Wadsworth	"Ghosts and Shadows: Reading Race in the Woman's Building Library of the World's Columbian Exposition, Chicago, 1893.”
2010	Ronald J. Zboray and Mary Zboray	"The Bullet in the Book: Reading Cultures During the Civil War."
2009	David Paul Nord	"Five Studies of Readers of Journalism."
2008	Martine Poulain	"Public Library History in the Late 20th Century: A Comparative Perspective (France, Britain, and the United States)."
2007	Akira Nemoto	“Library Policies of American Occupation.”
2006	John Y. Cole and Jane Aikin	“History as Collaboration.”

== Database of Library History ==
The Library History Round Table publishes the "Bibliography of Library History" database. The database contains over 7,000 entries for books, articles, and theses in library history and related fields published since 1990. Eric C. Novotny, founder of the database, was honored with the 2025 Innovation and Advocacy in Library History Award.

== Librarians We Have Lost- Sesquicentennial Memories -1976-2026 ==
In 2024 the Library History Round Table launched a digital memorial, "Librarians We Have Lost- Sesquicentennial Memories -1976-2026," as a project for the 150th anniversary of the American Library Association. This was a crowd-sourced project to honor historical library workers coordinated by Brett Spencer, editor of LHRT News and Notes, and affirmed by the Council of the American Library Association. At the time of the sesquicentennial celebration in July, 2026 over 500 tributes had been submitted.

== Awards ==
- The Justin Winsor Prize is awarded for the year's best library history essay. The award was established in 1978 and named for the American Library Association's first president, Justin Winsor, a writer, historian, and the long-time librarian at Harvard University. Honorees have included Steven Knowlton, Jennifer Burek Pierce, Robert S. Martin, Wayne A. Wiegand and John V. Richardson Jr.
- The Donald G. Davis Article Award is presented biannually to recognize the best article written in English in the field of library history in the last two years. The first award in 2000 was to Louise Robbins for "Fighting McCarthyism Through Film: A Library Censorship Case Becomes a Storm Center."
- The Eliza Atkins Gleason Book Award is presented every third year to recognize the best book written in English in the field of library history, including the history of libraries, librarianship, and book culture. The award is named after Eliza Atkins Gleason, the first African American to receive a Ph.D. in librarianship in 1940 at the University of Chicago Graduate Library School. Honorees have included Louise Robbins, Christine Pawley, and Mary Niles Maack.
- Phyllis Dain Library History Dissertation Award recognizes outstanding dissertations in English in the general area of library history. It was first awarded in 1991 to Plummer Alston Jones Jr. for his dissertation, "American Public Library Service to the Immigrant Community, 1876-1948." In 2021 it was awarded to Cindy Anh Nguyen for ""Reading and Misreading: The Social Life of Libraries and Colonial Control in Vietnam, 1865-1958."
- The "Innovation and Advocacy in Library History Award" acknowledges individuals or organizations that have made recent, substantive contributions to LHRT or to the wider library history community. It recognizes those who have promoted library history in exceptional or new ways or who have reached audiences that have not been engaged previously. Amanda Belantara and A.M. Alpin received the inaugural Award in 2023.
- The Distinguished Service in Library History Award honors the career of a person who has a lifetime of scholarship and service in the field of library history. Andrew Wertheimer received the inaugural Award in 2023.

== See also ==
- List of libraries
- List of libraries in the United States

== Additional reading ==
- Marshall, John David, ed. (1961). An American Library History Reader: Contributions to Library Literature. Hamden, Connecticut: The Shoe String Press. p. 464. LCCN 61-15684.
- Orvin Lee Shiflett (Spring 1984). "Clio's Claim: The Role of Historical Research in Library and Information Science". Library Trends. 32: 385–406 – via University of Illinois Library.
- Edward A. Goedeken (ed.), Literature of American Library History. Bbibliographic series that was published in the journal, Information & Culture, and its predecessors, Libraries & the Cultural Record and Libraries & Culture from 1990- 2017.
- Jean-Pierre V. M. Hérubel; E. A. Goedeken (1994). "Journals publishing American library history: a research note". Libraries & Culture. 29 (2): 205–209. JSTOR 25542634.
- D.W. Krummel (August 1999), Fiat lux, fiat latebra: a celebration of historical library functions, "Graduate School of Library and Information Science. University of Illinois. Occasional Paper 209"
- Edward A. Goedeken (2000). "The Library Historian's Field of Dreams: A Profile of the First Nine Seminars". Libraries & Culture. 35 (1): 161–72. JSTOR 25548805.
- D.W. Krummel (2000). "Historical Bibliography and Library History". Libraries & Culture. 35 (1): 155–160. JSTOR 25548804.
- John Mark Tucker (2000). "Clio's Workshop: Resources for Historical Studies in American Librarianship". Libraries & Culture. 35 (1): 192–214. JSTOR 25548807.
- Andrew B. Wertheimer; John David Marshall (2000). "Fifty Years of Promoting Library History: A Chronology of the ALA (American) Library History Round Table, 1947-1997". Libraries and Culture. 35 (1): 215–239. JSTOR 25548808.
- Edward A. Goedeken (2017). "Being Part of the Conversation: The Most Cited Articles in Library History and Library & Information History, 1967–2015". Library & Information History. 33 (1): 3–18. doi:10.1080/17583489.2017.1264183.
- D. G. Davis Jr. (2023). "Memories of the ALA Library History Round Table". Libraries: Culture, History & Society. 7 (2): 155–160. doi:10.5325/libraries.7.2.0155.
- Bernadette A. Lear (2023). "LHRT Leadership, Programs, and Awards, 1998–2023". Libraries: Culture, History, and Society. 7 (2): 181–215. doi:10.5325/libraries.7.2.0181.
- Bernadette A. Lear (2023). "Library History as a Community". Libraries: Culture, History & Society. 7 (1): 83–90. doi:10.5325/libraries.7.1.0083.
- Louise S. Robbins (2023). "LHRT: The Importance of Our History". Libraries: Culture, History & Society. 7 (1): 80–82. doi:10.5325/libraries.7.1.0080.
- Wayne A. Wiegand (2023). "Remembering LHRT". Libraries: Culture, History & Society. 7 (1): 66–71. doi:10.5325/libraries.7.1.0066.
