= Austin Presbyterian Theological Seminary =

Presbyterian seminary in Austin, Texas

Coordinates: 30.2923°N 97.7377°W

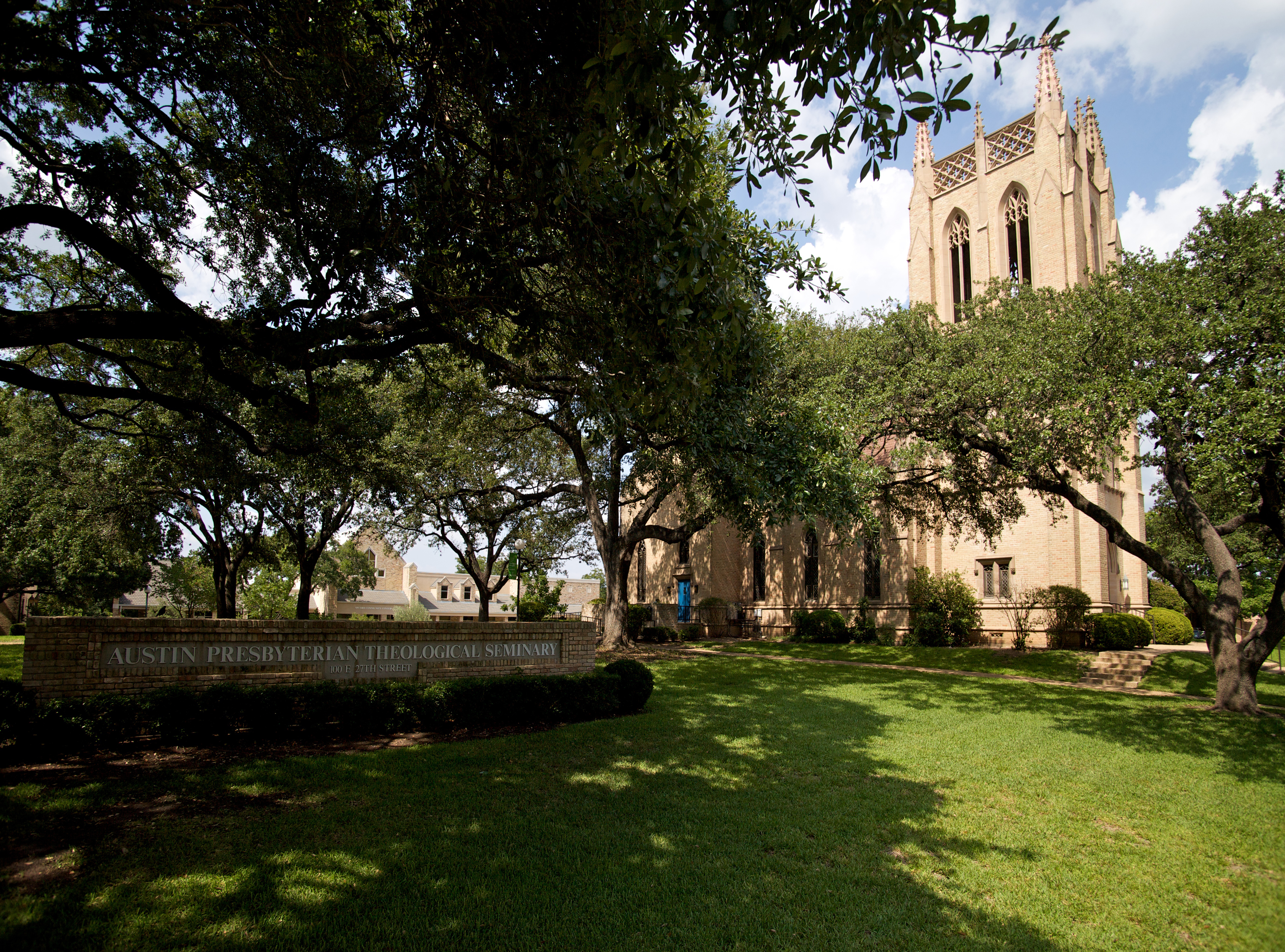
- Type: Seminary
- Established: 1902; 124 years ago
- Religious affiliation: Presbyterian Church (U.S.A.)
- Endowment: $159 million (2024)
- President: José R. Irizarry
- Dean: Margaret Aymer
- Academic staff: 20
- Students: 188
- Location: Austin, Texas, United States
- Website: www.austinseminary.edu

Austin Presbyterian Theological Seminary is a Presbyterian seminary in Austin, Texas. It was founded in 1902 to provide pastors for the rapidly growing Presbyterian Church in the frontier Southwest. It opened its doors to five students on October 1, 1902, at Ninth and Navasota Streets. The seminary moved to its present location adjacent to the University of Texas at Austin campus in 1908.

== History ==
Austin Presbyterian Theological Seminary was preceded by Austin School of Theology, 1884 – 1895, and Stuart Seminary, originally Stuart Female Seminary, 1876 – 1899.

Austin Seminary opened its doors on October 1, 1902, after years of work by the Synod of Texas of the Presbyterian Church in the United States to create a Seminary for formal theological education for Presbyterian ministers in the Southwest who would then stay in the Southwest and serve the growing number of Presbyterian churches in Texas. There was much debate about where to house the Seminary, and Sherman, Texas where Austin College was already in business was a key contender, but Austin was ultimately chosen in 1899, in part because of the success of a predecessor school, The Austin School of Theology (1884-1895), and in part because the building and grounds of a former girls' school in Austin (the Stuart Female Seminary, which had been active from 1876-1899) were donated by the heirs of the school’s founders and the Trustees of the former Austin School of Theology. Stuart Hall, as the building was known, was in East Austin at 9th and Navasota, and came with fully furnished dorm rooms, a large dining hall, a library with 1,100 volumes, a dining hall, and a chapel, with an electric trolley line running in front of the school. TR Sampson started work as the first president on June 10, 1900, and his initial job was to raise enough money and attract enough new students & faculty to officially open the Seminary. He was successful and the first class graduated in 1905. By 1906, however, the limitations of Stuart Hall were becoming obvious. The biggest of which was the two-mile distance between Austin Seminary and the University of Texas. Many seminary students took classes at both institutions and faculty, also frequently taught at both schools. The board started looking for land near UT and making a plan and raising funds to move the campus. This, once again, caused some discussion about moving the Seminary out of Austin. Two buildings, Sampson Hall (the dorm and classroom/administration building) and Lubbock Hall (the dining hall), along with some housing for faculty, were built on the site of the current campus at 27th and Speedway and classes started at the new location in March 1908.

== Academics ==
The seminary offers three degrees:

- Master of Divinity, including the dual degree MDiv/MSSW offered in partnership with the University of Texas at Austin Steve Hicks School of Social Work
- Master of Arts
- Doctor of Ministry

The seminary also offers non-degree programs, including two English-language certificates, the Certificate in Ministry and the Certificate in Jewish-Christian Relationship, and two Spanish-centric certificates, Certificado en Ministerio en Español and the bilingual Certificate in Christian Leadership for Hispanic Women. Education Beyond the Walls at Austin Seminary (EBW) offers workshops, webinars, and other opportunities for church leaders and the public. EBW also supports clergy through The College of Pastoral Leaders and Fellowships in Pastoral Leadership for Public Life programs. It resources ministry among Hispanic congregations through the Hispanic Ministries Mission Network, Instituto de Mujer Virtuosa Hispana, and Latinx Church Leadership Renewal Grants for congregational revitalization.

=== Accreditation and memberships ===
Austin Presbyterian Theological Seminary is accredited by the Association of Theological Schools in the United States and Canada and the Southern Association of Colleges and Schools. It is a member of the Council of Southwestern Theological Schools, American Schools of Oriental Research, and the Association for Clinical Pastoral Education.

The seminary is related to the Synod of the Sun and to the General Assembly of the Presbyterian Church (U.S.A.). It is one of the nine official PC(USA) seminaries. The seminary is approved by The University Senate of The United Methodist Church and attracts students from many Protestant denominations.

== Campus ==
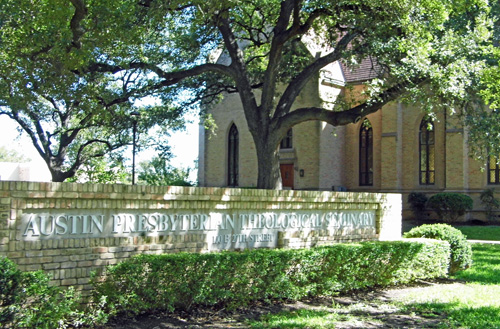

The campus comprises 12 acres in the center of Austin, Texas. Its main buildings include the McCord Community Center, McMillan Memorial Classroom Building, Trull Administration Building, the Mary B. and Robert J. Wright Learning and Information Center, Shelton Chapel, and student residential buildings, including duplexes, Currie Hall (a co-ed dormitory), McCoy House, and the John F. and Nancy Anderson House apartments.

=== Library and archives ===
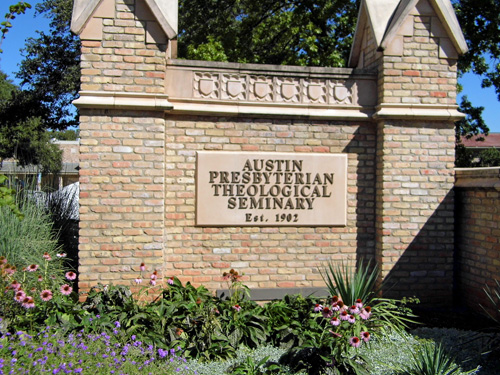

The Stitt Collection contains approximately 96,000 print volumes and 399,000 ebooks. The Austin Seminary Archives collects, preserves, and provides access to material documenting the history of the seminary, as well as the work of the Presbyterian Church in Texas, Louisiana, Arkansas, and Oklahoma. The Archives provides physical and intellectual access to the collections. One notable collection in the archives is The Apollo Prayer League collection, which contains a mounted Microform KJV Bible that was part of a set that traveled in the spacesuit of astronaut Edgar D. Mitchell during the 1971 Apollo 14 mission to the moon.

== Notable alumni ==
=== Stuart Seminary ===
- Amelia Worthington Williams, Texas historian

=== Austin Seminary ===
- James Talarico, politician and teacher
- Donald G. Davis, Jr.

== See also ==
- Presbyterian Church in the United States
