= ALA Notable lists =

American Library Association Notable lists are announced each year in January by various divisions within the American Library Association (ALA). There are six lists which are part of the larger ALA awards structure.

- ALA Notable Books for Adults (established 1944) is an annual list selected by the Reference and User Services Association (RUSA), a division of the ALA. Within RUSA, a 12-member Notable Books Council selects "25 very good, very readable, and at times very important fiction, non-fiction, and poetry books for the adult reader."
- ALA Notable Books for Children (established 1940) is an annual list selected by the Association for Library Service to Children (ALSC), a division of the ALA. Within ALSC, a Selection Committee "identifies the best of the best in children's books." According to ALSC policy, the current year's Newbery Medal, Caldecott Medal, Belpré Medal, Sibert Medal, Geisel Award, and Batchelder Award books automatically are added to the Notable Children's Books list.
- ALA Notable Children's Videos (1973–2017) was an annual list selected by the Association for Library Service to Children (ALSC). The list identified the best in children's video.
- ALA Notable Children's Recordings (established 1975) is an annual list selected by the Association for Library Service to Children (ALSC). The list identifies the best in children's recordings.
- ALA Notable Government Documents (established 1984) is an annual list selected by GODORT (Government Documents Round Table), a division of the ALA. The list recognizes documents, reports, websites, and other publications by US federal, state, and local governments, as well as other countries' governments, and international organizations such as the United Nations.
- ALA Notable Films for Adults (established 1998) is an annual list selected by the Film and Media Round Table, a division of the ALA (in 2018, name was changed from Video Round Table). It is a list of 15 outstanding programs released on video within the past two years and suitable for all libraries serving adults.
