= Louis Shores =

Louis Shores (September 14, 1904 – June 19, 1981) was a librarian who worked for the promotion of the library as the center of all learning, in both public and academic institutions. Shores was recognized for his integration of audiovisual materials into library collections. He was named one of the “100 of the most important leaders we had in the 20th century” by American Libraries, and the impact of his vision can be seen today in libraries across the country.

== Biography ==
=== Early life ===
Louis Shores was born Louis Steinberg on September 14, 1904, in Buffalo, New York. Shores was the third of five children of Paul and Ernestine (Lutenberg) Steinberg. Both immigrants, Paul was painter specializing in portraits, while Ernestine supported the household as a seamstress.

The family moved a couple of times in search of better jobs and education for their family. In 1919 Shores had his first job in a library, as a page at the Toledo Public Library. It was in Toledo, Ohio that Paul died in 1923.

=== Education ===
When he graduated from high school in 1922, Shores attended the University of Toledo. He also moved from his public library job to a position in the university's library. It was at this time that Shores began developing his opinion that libraries and their resources could provide an overall education superior to that of more traditional instruction given in classrooms.

Louis changed his last name from Steinberg to Shores in 1926, as his older brother had done when he left their childhood home in 1920. The change of name goes unmentioned by Shores in his writings and therefore the reasoning behind it remains unknown. The same year Shores changed his name he graduated from the University of Toledo and followed his family to New York City, where he attended the City College of New York in order to earn a master's degree in education.

Upon earning his master's degree, Shores could not find a teaching position. Turning his attention to a different career he enrolled at the School of Library Service at Columbia University in 1927.

With his Masters in Library Service, in 1928 Shores took a position at the Fisk University in Nashville, Tennessee. In 1930 Shores entered the University of Chicago Graduate Library School to earn his doctorate, which he left uncompleted in 1931. During his year in Chicago he met and married Geraldine Urist. He then returned to his position at Fisk University.

Shores would later earn a PhD in 1933—not in Library Science, but in Education—from the George Peabody College for Teachers, with his dissertation (later to become a published book), “Origins of the American College Library, 1630-1800.”

=== Career ===
Shores left Fisk to start a new library program at Peabody in 1933. His work at Peabody, shaping and developing the library program, was interrupted by World War II. Shores joined the Army in 1943, at the age of 39. He served in the Army Airways Communications System (AACS), responsible for global air traffic control, communications, navigation aids, and weather services supporting long-range transport and supply missions. His duties to the US Army kept him absent from Peabody until 1946, at which point disagreements about salary and work load caused the end of his association with the college.

In 1946 Shores accepted two positions: to be the first Dean of the Library School at Florida State University and an editorial advisor for the encyclopedia company, P.F. Collier & Son. He would maintain these two jobs for the rest of his career.

Shores contributed one of the most-used reference books of his time, Basic Reference Books. First released in 1939, the only thing that prevented it from becoming a true milestone in his life and the history of library science was his lackluster updating of the text. The last edition was completed in 1954 with the updated title, Basic Reference Sources.

Shores and Wayne Shirley were instrumental in founding the Library History Round Table of the American Library Association in 1947. In 1961 Shores founded the Library History Seminars. Shores' essay, "The Importance of Library History" outlined the reasons it is foundational to the education of librarians.

One of the highlights of Shores' career was the American Library Association accreditation of his Library School at FSU in 1953. Shores received the Beta Phi Mu Award for distinguished service to library education in 1967.

In 1967 Shores was forced to retire due to health issues. He continued to take on as much work as he could, as an editor and speaker, when his health allowed. Shores wrote more books in this period of his life than any other: seven post-retirement to his five previously. Upon his retirement, FSU gave Shores the honor of dean emeritus until his death in 1981. The school also honored him by naming a building after him in 1981, the Louis Shores Building, which houses the library school to this day.

The American Library Association, Reference and User Services Association gives the Louis Shores Award annually for excellence in book and media reviewing.

== Philosophy ==
Shores believed that libraries were places of lifelong learning and that that learning should begin early. He extolled the importance of introducing children to books and reading in infancy and encouraging learning through the use of the libraries.

=== The generic book ===
Shores believed in an idea he referred to as the “generic book”—his term for all materials in the library. He first published this concept in a 1958 issue of the Saturday Review and later expanded it into a book called The Generic Book.

In it, Shores outlined several different formats: Print (i.e. book or journal), Graphic (globe or photograph), Projection (film or slide), Transmission (radio or tape recording), Resource (person or object), Program (computer or machine) and Extrasensory (telepathy or clairvoyance). Shores talked about how all of these things were integral to learning and that the majority of them should be found in the library.

=== The Materials Center ===
Shores believed that the library should be the center of the educational institution. He believed that the librarian should not just find books, but also be a teacher, and should advise students on materials to further their independent study. Shores thought a person could get more out of his or her personal drive to learn than in any classroom, and that the library was the key to this learning.

Shores also came to believe in the importance of media beyond books. He thought the stocking of films, slides, audio recordings and maps essential for a well-rounded library collection. However, Shores did not like the presence of audiovisual departments in school; he felt the library should house all the learning materials and that every librarian should be a media specialist. He even dreamed of a library where movies and books on a given subject would be shelved together.

In 1947, Shores put his philosophy to work when setting up the library at FSU. He called the library the “Materials Center” to be more inclusive of all the kinds of resources therein, including 16mm films, filmstrips, discs, tapes, slides and transparencies among others.

The Materials Center used color-coding to indicate the format of a resource in the card catalog and had the equipment necessary to use audiovisual materials, including one of the earliest “listening posts” where you could listen to recordings over headphones. It was an influential idea, but took time to take effect; it was not until the mid-1960s that librarians and media-specialist became one and the same at many schools.

== Works ==
A selection of some of Shore's written works.

- 1928. How to use your library : a series of articles on libraries for high school and college students. Pittsburgh, Pa.: Scholastic Pub. Co.
- Shores, Louis (1935). Origins of the American College Library, 1638-1800. New York: Barnes & Noble.
- 1935. Shores, Louis (1977). The Generic Book: What It Is and How It Works. Norman, OK: Library-College Associates.
- 1936. Bibliographies and summaries in education to July 1935; a catalog of more than 4000 annotated bibliographies and summaries listed under author and subject in one alphabet. Written with Monroe, W. S. New York: The H. W. Wilson company.
- 1937. Know your encyclopedia; a unit of library instruction based on Compton's pictured encyclopedia. Chicago: F.E. Compton & Co.
- 1939. Basic reference books; an introduction to the evaluation, study, and use of reference materials with special emphasis on some 300 titles. Chicago, Ill.: American library association.
- 1947. Highways in the sky: the story of the AACS. New York: Barnes & Noble.
- 1953. Challenges to librarianship. Tallahassee, FL: Florida State University.
- 1953. A profession of faith. Geneseo, N.Y.: State University Teachers College.
- 1954. Basic reference sources; an introduction to materials and methods. Chicago: American Library Assn.
- 1954. Basic reference sources: an introduction to materials and methods. Chicago: American Library Association. Repring 1973. Littleton, CO: Libraries Unlimited.
- 1960. Instructional materials: an introduction for teachers. New York: Ronald.
- Shores, Louis (1961). "The Importance of Library History". In Marshall, John David (ed.). An American Library History Reader: Contributions to Library Literature. comp. Hamden, Conn.: Shoe String Press.
- 1965. Mark Hopkin’s log and other essays. Selected by John D. Marshall. Hamdem, CT: Shoe String.
- 1972. Library Education. Littleton, CO: Libraries Unlimited.
- 1972. Looking forward to 1999. Tallahassee, FL: South Pass Press.
- 1973. Audiovisual librarianship: the crusade for media unity (1946-1969). Littleton, CO: Libraries Unlimited.
- 1975. Shores, Louis (1975). Quiet World: A Librarian’s Crusade for Destiny—The Professional Autobiography of Louis Shores. Hamden, CT: Linnet Books. p. 309.
- 1977. Shores, Louis (1977). The Generic Book: What It Is and How It Works. Norman, OK: Library-College Associates.
