= Eliza Atkins Gleason Book Award =

Eliza Atkins Gleason Book Award is presented by the Library History Round Table of the American Library Association every third year to recognize the best book written in English in the field of library history, including the history of libraries, librarianship, and book culture.

The award is named after Eliza Atkins Gleason, the first African American to receive a Ph.D. in librarianship in 1940. Her Ph.D. was earned at the University of Chicago Graduate Library School under advisor, Carleton B. Joeckel. The dissertation was revised and published in 1941 by the University of Chicago Press as The Southern Negro and the Public Library; a Study of the Government and Administration of Public Library Service to Negroes in the South.

The Library History Round Table also sponsors the Justin Winsor Prize (library).

The Library History Round Table, was established in 1947. Historical articles appeared on the 50th anniversary in the journal, Libraries & Culture and the 75th in the journal, Libraries: Culture, History, and Society .

== Recipients ==
Eliza Atkins Gleason Book Award Book Award Recipients
Year	Author	Title	Publisher	Ref.
2004	Louise Robbins	The Dismissal of Miss Ruth Brown: Civil Rights, Censorship, and the American Library	University of Massachusetts Press	
2007	Carl Ostrowski	Books, Maps, and Politics: a Cultural History of the Library of Congress, 1783-1861	University of Massachusetts Press	
2010	David Allan	A Nation of Readers: The Lending Library in Georgian England	British Library	
2013	Dr. Christine Pawley	Reading Places: Literacy, Democracy, and the Public Library in Cold War America	University of Massachusetts Press	
2016	Dr. Cheryl Knott	Not Free, Not for All: Public Libraries in the Age of Jim Crow	University of Massachusetts Press	
2019	Wayne A. Wiegand and Shirley A. Wiegand	The Desegregation of Public Libraries in the Jim Crow South	Louisiana State University Press	
2022	Rebecka Taves Sheffield	Documenting Rebellions: A Study of Four Lesbian and Gay Archives in Queer Times	Litwin Books, LLC 2020	
2025	Laura E. Helton	Scattered and Fugitive Things: How Black Collectors Created Archives and Remade History	Columbia University Press 2024	
