= University of Texas at Austin School of Information =

Graduate school of library and information science

The University of Texas at Austin School of Information
- Former names: Graduate School of Library and Information Science
- Established: 1948
- Parent institution: University of Texas at Austin
- Dean: Soo Young Rieh
- Students: approx. 800 students (2025)
- Location: Austin, Texas, United States
- Website: ischool.utexas.edu

The University of Texas School of Information (abbreviated UT iSchool) is the information school at the University of Texas at Austin.

The school offers undergraduate degrees in informatics, master's and doctoral degrees in information studies, master’s degrees in information security and privacy, as well as school librarian certificate program and an undergraduate minor in informatics. UT iSchool graduates find careers in user experience design, data analytics, data science, archival science, librarianship, preservation, and records management.

== History ==
The school was founded in 1948 as a part of the UT Graduate School as the Graduate School of Library Science, offering a Master of Library Science (MLS) degree as well as certification for school librarianship, an offering which has been continually provided to this day. In 1967 the school initiated a Certificate of Advanced Study followed in 1969-70 by a doctoral program, leading to the Doctor of Philosophy degree.

The school's name was changed in 1980 to Graduate School of Library and Information Science in recognition of the increased emphasis on information science in the curriculum, as it had evolved since the late 1960s. At the same time, the master's degree was succeeded by the Master of Library and Information Science (MLIS) in 1980, and the Master of Science in Information Studies (MSIS) in 2000. In 2002, the faculty voted unanimously to change the school's name to the School of Information. The new name took effect in 2003 to better reflect the diversity of issues and the multidisciplinary nature of the studies in the information field. The school is a founding member of the iCaucus, and in 2021, began offering bachelor’s degrees in informatics.

In February 2026, UT Austin president Jim Davis announced the consolidation of iSchool with the Department of Computer Science and the Department of Statistics and Data Science into a new School of Computing within the College of Natural Sciences.

== Academic programs ==
The School of Information offers programs leading to the Master of Science in Information Studies degree, the Doctor of Philosophy degree, Certificates of Advanced Study, and the Learning Resources Certification for School Librarians. The school also offers a minor in information studies for undergraduate students at UT. In 2015, the School of Information launched an executive education program in identity management and security (MSIMS) partnered with the University of Texas Center for Identity. The school does not provide distance education.

== Student organizations and groups ==
Students in iSchool have participated in the Student Association of the School of Information (SASI), as well as organizations represented in the UT Austin Student Chapter. In the latter, some of the associations involved specialized in archiving, librarianship, and information technology, which includes the following groups:

Archives and Preservation

- The Cultural Heritage & Information Preservation Society (CHIPS)
- Society of American Archivists (SAA)

Librarianship

- American Library Association (ALA)
- Special Libraries Association (SLA)

Information Technology

- Association for Information Science and Technology (ASIS&T)
- Advocating for Women in Technology (AWIT)

== Rankings ==
In 2015, U.S. News & World Report ranked the School of Information the #6 library and information science program in the nation (tied with Rutgers University and Syracuse University), and in 2025, it became the third nationally ranked school according to the Quacquarelli Symonds World University Rankings.

== People ==
=== Notable alumni ===
- Laura Bush, former first lady
- Carolyn Harris, library conservationist
- Shelley Sweeney, archivist

=== Current and former faculty ===
- David B. Gracy II, former professor
- Loriene Roy, professor
- Roberta I. Shaffer, former dean and professor
- Brooke E. Sheldon, former dean and professor

== Publications ==
Since 1976, the School of Information has housed Information & Culture, an academic journal on the subject of information history.
