= Andrew Dillon (professor) =

Information science academic

Andrew Dillon is the V.M. Daniel Regents Professor at the University of Texas at Austin School of Information. His background is in psychology, with an emphasis on how humans interact with technology. Dillon is the recipient of the 2023 Award of Merit from the Association for Information Science and Technology (ASIS&T).

== Academic career ==
Dillon completed Bachelor of Arts and Master of Arts degrees in Psychology from University College Cork in Ireland, then went on to earn his Ph.D. at Department of Human Sciences at Loughborough University in the UK.

Dillon was previously the president of ASIS&T, a research fellow at the Human Sciences & Advanced Technology Research Institute, and a founder of Indiana University’s Masters in Human-Computer Interaction at the School of Informatics.

In addition to his professorship at UT Austin, Dillon is also the Director of Research Dissemination at the National Disability Center.

=== Area of study ===
Dillon brought his psychology background into the field of information science by studying how humans access and interpret data using technology, which has a variety of applications in the modern data-driven world.

== Awards ==
- 2006: Rudolph J. Joenk, Jr. Award for the IEEE Transactions on Professional Communication in 2006
- 2019: North American Conference on Knowledge Organization Best Paper Award
- 2023: ASISI&T Award of Merit
- 2024: Best Student Paper (with Dillon as co-author) at the Canadian Association for Information Science (CAIS) Annual Conference
- Three-time recipient of the Teaching Excellence Recognition Award at Indiana University

== Selected publications ==
Dillon has almost 200 publications since the 1980s specializing in user experience, accessibility, human-computer interaction, user-centered design, and information architecture.

- Ayon, V. and Dillon, A. (2021) Assistive Technology in Education: Conceptions of a Socio-technical Design Challenge. International Journal of Information Diversity and Inclusion, 5,3, 174-184
- Dillon, A. (2023) Understanding Users: Designing Experience through Layers of Meaning. New York: Routledge.
- Schloss, I. and Dillon, A. (2024) Shaping the Future of Therapy: A Call for the Involvement of Information Scholars in Designing Digital Tools for Mental Health. Canadian Association for Information Science Annual Conference, CAIS 2024, July.
- Suzuki, T., Dillon, A. and Fleischman, K. (2024) Exploring the Intersection of Digital Placemaking and Information Science in Smart Cities, Canadian Association for Information Science Annual Conference, CAIS 2024, July. Winner of Best Student Author paper.
