= Phyllis Dain =

Phyllis Dain (November 29, 1929 – June 2018) was an American library historian, educator, and scholar who was a faculty member at Columbia University School of Library Service.

== Education and career ==
Dain was born November 29, 1929, in New York City. She earned a Bachelor of Arts degree from Brooklyn College in 1950. She earned a Master of Science in Library Service in 1953, a Master of Arts in U.S. History in 1957, and a Doctor of Library Science (DLS) in 1966.

Dain began her professional career in 1953 as a cataloger at the Columbia University Libraries.

In 1957 she started teaching courses in the School of Library Service at Columbia, where she was a faculty member until her retirement in 1995 as professor emerita of Library Service. She was an advocate in the effort to preserve Columbia University's School of Library Service during the university's budgetary crisis of the late 1980s and early 1990s; the school ultimately closed in 1991.

During her academic career she combined teaching with research and writing in library history emphasizing the social, cultural, and institutional contexts of libraries.

Dain was as chair of the Library History Round Table of the American Library Association.

She served on the board of trustees of the Leonia Public Library (NJ) from 1976 until her death in 2018.

== Legacy ==
The Phyllis Dain Library History Dissertation Award was established by the Library History Round Table in 1991.

It is presented every two years to recognize outstanding English-language dissertations in library history. The award honors Dain's legacy as a rigorous scholar and a supportive mentor. Past winners of the award include prominent library historians.

The Leonia Public Library named a Reading Room in her memory.

== Selected Publications ==
- Dain, Phyllis (1972). The New York Public Library: A History of Its Founding and Early Years. New York: New York Public Library, Astor, Lenox and Tilden Foundations.
- Dain, Phyllis; Stieg, Margaret F., eds. (Winter 1979). "Libraries and Society: Research and Thought". Library Trends. 27 (3). University of Illinois Graduate School of Library and Information Science.
- Dain, Phyllis; Cole, John Y., eds. (1990). Libraries and Scholarly Communication in the United States: The Historical Dimension. Beta Phi Mu Monograph Series. New York: Greenwood Press. ISBN 0-313-26807-X.
- Dain, Phyllis (March 1991). "Public Library Governance and a Changing New York City". Libraries & Culture. 26: 219–50.
- Dain, Phyllis (January 1996). "American Public Libraries and the Third Sector: Historical Reflections and Implications". Libraries & Culture. 31 (1): 56–84.
- Molz, Redmond Kathleen; Dain, Phyllis (1999). Civic Space/Cyberspace: The American Public Library in the Information Age. Cambridge, MA: MIT Press.
- Dain, Phyllis (Winter 2000). "The Historical Sensibility". Libraries & Culture. 35 (1): 240–43.
