= Justin Winsor Prize (library) =

The Justin Winsor Prize is awarded by the Library History Round Table of the American Library Association for the year's best library history essay. The award was established in 1978 and named for the American Library Association's first president, Justin Winsor. Winsor (1831–1896) was a prominent writer, historian, and the long-time Librarian at Harvard University.

The Library History Round Table also sponsors the Eliza Atkins Gleason Book Award.

The Library History Round Table official peer-reviewed journal is Libraries: Culture, History, and Society.

LHRT News and Notes is the blog of the Library History Round Table.

The Library History Round Table publishes the "Bibliography of Library History" database.

The Library History Round Table, was established in 1947. Historical articles appeared on the 50th anniversary in the journal, Libraries & Culture and the 75th in the journal, Libraries: Culture, History, and Society .

Justin Winsor Prize	Date	Title
Alex Poole	2026	“‘The Michael Jordan of library systems’: Carla D. Hayden and the Black Liberal Tradition.”
Jonathan Victor Baldoza	2025	“A suitable place: Empire and the Philippine Library, 1910-1916.”
Alex H. Poole	2024	“If I’m fighting for myself, it is so that whoever stands on my shoulders can go further than I”: The Intellectual Community of Black Women Children’s Librarians in the mid-Twentieth Century United States.”
Madison Ingram	2023	"Chief Hope of Democracy: Educational Influences on the Segregated Carnegie Libraries of Atlanta."
Alex H. Poole	2022	“Will the day ever come when we will be judged on our merit and not on our blackness?” The Rise of the Black Caucus of the American Library Association, 1970-1975.”
Jennifer Burek Pierce	2021	More Than a Room with Books: The Development of Author Visits for Young People in Mid-Century U.S. Public Libraries.
Julie Park	2020	Infrastructure Story: The Los Angeles Central Library’s Architectural History.
Steven Knowlton	2019	A Rapidly Escalating Demand: Academic Libraries and the Birth of Black Studies Programs.
No Award	2018	
Alexander Ames	2017	The 'Spirit of The Fatherland': German-American Culture And Community in the Library and Archive of the German Society of Pennsylvania, 1817-2017.
Steven A. Knowlton	2016	Since I was a citizen, I had the right to attend the library: the key role of the public library in the civil rights movement in Memphis.
Sharon McQueen	2015	The Feminization of Ferdinand: Perceptions of Gender Nonconformity in a Classic Children’s Picture Book.
Kate Stewart	2014	The Man in the Rice Paddies Had Something to READ: Military Libraries and Intellectual Freedom in the Vietnam War.
Nicola Wilson Boots	2013	Book-Lovers' library, the Novel, and James Hanley's The Furys (1935).
Ashley Maynor	2012	All the World’s Memory: Implications for the Internet as Archive and Portal for Our Cultural Heritage.
Cody White	2011	Rising from the Ashes: Lessons Learned from the Impact of Proposition 13 on Public Libraries in California.
Pamela R. Bleisch	2010	Spoilsmen and Daughters of the Republic: Political Interference in the Texas State Library during the tenure of Elizabeth Howard West, 1911-1925.
Richard LeComte	2009	Writers Blocked: The Debate Over Public Lending Right in the United States During the 1980s.
Jeremy Dibbell	2008	A Library of the Most Celebrated & Approved Authors: The First Purchase Collection of Union College.
Jean L. Preer	2007	Promoting Citizenship: Librarians Help Get Out the Vote in the 1952 Presidential Election.
No award	2006	
Donald C. Boyd	2005	The Book Women of Kentucky: The WPA Pack Horse Library Project, 1935-1943.
Joyce M. Latham	2004	Clergy of the Mind: William S. Learned, the Carnegie Corporation, and the American Library Association.
No award	2003	
Marek Sroka	2002	The Destruction of Jewish Libraries and Archives in Crakow (Krakow) During World War II.
No award	2001	
No award	2000	
Christine Pawley	1999	Advocate for Access: Lutie Stearns and the Traveling Libraries of the Wisconsin Free Library Commission, 1895-1914.
No award	1998	
Cheryl Knott Malone	1997	Houston's Colored Carnegie Library, 1907-1922.
Wayne A. Wiegand	1996	The Amherst Method: The Origins of the Dewey Decimal Classification Scheme.
No award	1995	
No award	1994	
No award	1993	
Joanne E. Passet	1992	Men in a Feminized Profession: The Male Librarian, 1887-1921.
Margaret Stieg	1991	Post-War Purge of the German Public Libraries, Democracy, and the American Reaction.
John V. Richardson Jr.	1990	Teaching General Reference Work: The Essential Paradigm, 1890-1900.
Frederick J. Stielow	1989	Librarians, Warriors, and Rapprochement: Carl Milam, Archibald MacLeish, and World War II.
Brother Thomas O'Connor	1988	Library Service to the American Committee to Negotiate Peace and to the Preparatory Inquiry, 1917-1919.
Rosalee McReynolds	1987	American Nervousness and Turn of the Century Librarians.
Ronald Blazek	1986	Adult Education and Economic Opportunity in the Gilded Age: The Library, the Chautauqua, and the Railroads in DeFuniak Springs, Florida.
No award	1985	
Lawrence Joseph Yeatman	1984	Literary Culture and the Role of Libraries in Democratic America: Baltimore, 1815-1940
Robert S. Martin	1983	Maurice F. Tauber’s ‘Louis Round Wilson’: An Analysis of a Collaboration
Pamela Spence Richards and Wayne A. Wiegand.	1982	Richards: “‘Aryan Librarianship’: Academic and Research Libraries under Hitler.”; Wiegand: "British Propaganda in American Libraries, 1914-1917."
Mary Niles Maack	1981	Women Librarians in France: The First Generation.
No award	1980	
Dennis Thompson	1979	The Private Wars of Chicago’s Big Bill Thompson.

== See also ==
- American Historical Association : Justin Winsor Prize, awarded between 1896 and 1938
- List of history awards
- List of social sciences awards
