= Information & Culture =

- Discipline: Information science
- Language: English
- Edited by: Andrew Dillon, Ciaran B. Trace

Publication details
- Former names: The Journal of Library History; Libraries & Culture; Libraries and the Cultural Record; Journal of Library History, Philosophy, and Comparative Librarianship
- History: 1966–present
- Publisher: University of Texas Press (United States)
- Frequency: Triannually

Standard abbreviations
- ISO 4: Inf. Cult.

Indexing
- Information & Culture
- ISSN: 2166-3033 (print); 1534-7591 (web)
- LCCN: 2011202481
- JSTOR: 21663033
- OCLC no.: 762796337
- Libraries and the Cultural Record
- ISSN: 1932-4855 (print); 1932-9555 (web)
- LCCN: 2006213745
- Libraries & Culture
- ISSN: 0894-8631 (print); 1534-7591 (web)
- LCCN: 88641577
- The Journal of Library History
- ISSN: 0275-3650
- LCCN: 84640622
- Journal of Library History, Philosophy, and Comparative Librarianship
- ISSN: 0090-8894
- LCCN: 84640621
- Journal of Library History
- ISSN: 0022-2259
- LCCN: 65009989

Links
- Journal homepage; Online archive; Journal page at Project MUSE

Information & Culture is a triannual peer-reviewed academic journal that covers work addressing the reciprocal relationships between information and culture with a human-centered focus. It was established in 1966 as The Journal of Library History and was published at Florida State University School of Library Science until it moved to the University of Texas Press in 1976.The editor from 1976-2004 was Donald G. Davis, Jr.

It was briefly known as Journal of Library History, Philosophy, and Comparative Librarianship before returning to Journal of Library History. In 1988, the title was changed to Libraries & Culture, and changed again to Libraries and the Cultural Record in 2006. In 2012, the journal obtained its current title. The editor-in-chief is Andrew Dillon (University of Texas at Austin School of Information). It is abstracted and indexed in America: History and Life, Arts and Humanities Citation Index, Book Review Index, Bulletin des Bibliothèques de France, Historical Abstracts, Journal of American History, Library and Information Science Abstracts, Library Literature and Information Science, MLA International Bibliography, and Social Sciences Citation Index.
