= Wayne A. Wiegand =

American library historian

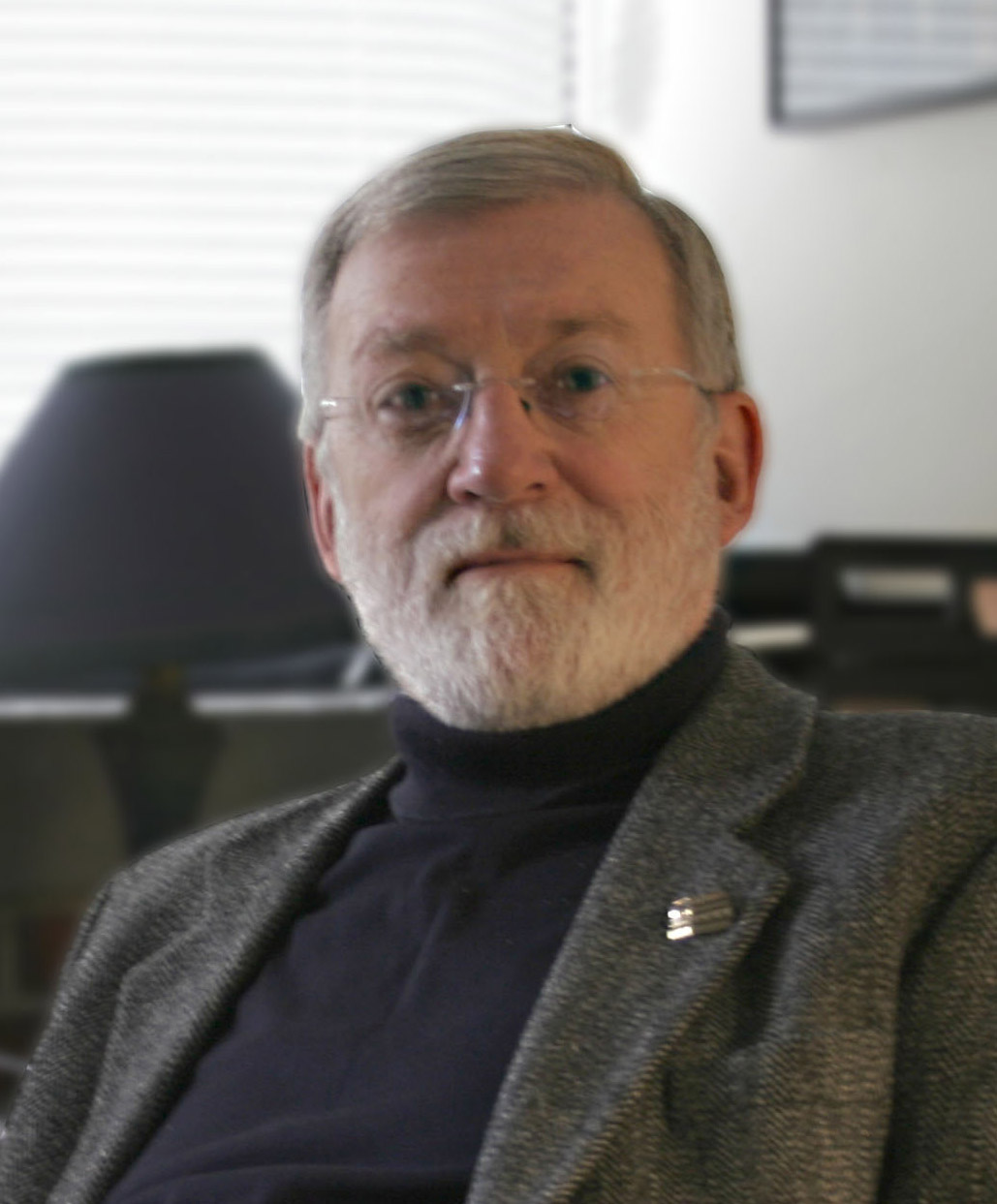
- Born: Wayne August Wiegand; April 15, 1946
- Occupations: Historian, University professor

Wayne August Wiegand (born April 15, 1946) is an American library historian, author, and academic. Wiegand retired as F. William Summers Professor of Library and Information Studies and Professor of American Studies at Florida State University in 2010.

== Early life and education ==
Wiegand received a BA in history at the University of Wisconsin–Oshkosh (1968), an MA in history at the University of Wisconsin–Milwaukee (1970), an MLS at Western Michigan University and a Ph.D. in history at Southern Illinois University (1974).

== Career ==
Wiegand was Librarian at Urbana College in Ohio (1974-1976). He taught at the College of Library Science at the University of Kentucky from 1976 through 1986.

From 1987-2002 he was a professor at the School of Library and Information Studies at the University of Wisconsin–Madison. At the University of Wisconsin-Madison he served as cofounder and Co-Director of the Center for the History of Print Culture in Modern America (a joint program of the University and the Wisconsin Historical Society established in 1992).

He served as William Rand Kenan Jr. Visiting Professor at the University of North Carolina at Chapel Hill and as Fellow in the UW–Madison's Institute for Research in the Humanities. He was an elected member of the American Antiquarian Society and a Spencer Foundation Fellow.

At Florida State University, Tallahassee he was F. William Summers Professor of Library and Information Studies and professor of American studies, 2003—2010.

Between 2004 and 2007, he served as Executive Director of Beta Phi Mu (the International Library and Information Science Honor Society). Wiegand co-organized the Florida Book Awards as a member of the faculty of the FSU Program in American & Florida Studies.

For the academic year 2009-2010, he shared time between Florida State University in Tallahassee and the Winter Park Institute of Rollins College, where he was "Scholar in Residence." In 2011, he received a Short-Term Fellowship from the New York Public Library.

In 2024 the Library History Round Table awarded Wiegand the Distinguished Service in Library History Award which honors the career of a person who has a lifetime of scholarship and service in the field of library history.

== Writing ==
From 2008-2009, he had a Fellowship from the National Endowment for the Humanities to write a book entitled Part of Our Lives: A People's History of the American Public Library, which was published by Oxford University Press in 2015. Notable among library histories for its emphasis on user experience and the role of libraries as community institutions, the book has been described as a "landmark" in library history marked by "impassioned advocacy" and "solid scholarship". The book precedes a documentary on the American public library "Free for All: The American Public Library" (released in 2025) by independent film makers.

From January to May 2017, he was Distinguished Visiting Scholar at the Library of Congress's John W. Kluge Center, researching a book on the history of American public school librarianship. It later appeared as American Public School Librarianship: A History (Johns Hopkins University Press, 2021).

In spring 2018, Louisiana State University Press published The Desegregation of Public Libraries in the Jim Crow South: Civil Rights and Local Activism, a book he coauthored with his wife, Shirley A. Wiegand. It was awarded the 2019 Eliza Atkins Gleason Book Award by the Library History Round Table of the American Library Association.

In September, 2024, the University Press of Mississippi published In Silence or Indifference: Racism and Jim Crow Segregated Public School Libraries. Wiegand has been a forceful voice demanding that "librarianship engage with and reflect on its own historical amnesia, and process the missing information into its collective memory so the profession no longer perpetuates self-serving historical myths."

His next book-length project is tentatively entitled Soul of the City: A People's History of the San Francisco Public Library (expected 2029).

== Selected Awards and Honors ==
- 2025-2026."Out of Sight, Out of Mind: Missing Stories in American Library History." Gryphon Lecture. School of Information Sciences. University of Illinois Urbana-Champaign
- 2024. Distinguished Service in Library History Award (Library History Round Table)
- 2019. Winner, Eliza Atkins Gleason Award for The Desegregation of Public Libraries in the Jim Crow South: Civil Rights and Local Activism (LSU Press, 2018), coauthored with Shirley A. Wiegand and awarded by American Library Association Library History Round Table for Best Book Published Between 2016 and 2018.
- 2008. Winner (with coauthor Shirley Wiegand), Muriel H. Wright Award for “Sooner State Civil Liberties in Perilous Times, 1940-1941: Part 2; Oklahoma’s little Dies Committee,” as best article to appear in The Chronicles of Oklahoma, 2008 volume year.
- 2007. Selected, Book-of-the-Month, American Booksellers Committee on Free Expression, November (for Books on Trial: Red Scare in the Heartland, 2007).
- 1999. Elected Member, American Antiquarian Society.
- 1999. Winner, Carey McWilliams Award for Contribution to Multicultural Literature, for Print Culture in a Diverse America (1998), co-edited with James P. Danky.
- 1997. Winner, G.K. Hall Award for Outstanding Contribution to Library Literature, American Library Association, for book, Irrepressible Reformer: A Biography of Melvil Dewey (1996).
- 1996. Winner, Justin Winsor Award, Library History Round Table, “The `Amherst Method:’ The Origins of the Dewey Decimal Classification Scheme.”
- 1993. Winner, Research Paper Award, Association for Library and Information Science Education, “Catalog of “A.L.A.” Library: Origins of a Genre.”
- 1991. Winner, G.K. Hall Award for Outstanding Contribution to Library Literature, American Library Association, for book, An Active Instrument for Propaganda:’ American Public Libraries During World War I (1989).
- 1990. William Best Hesseltine Award for “In Service to the State: Wisconsin Public Libraries During World War I,” as best article to appear in the Wisconsin Magazine of History, 1989 volume year.
- 1988. Winner, G.K. Hall Award for Outstanding Contribution to Library Literature, American Library Association, for book, Politics of An Emerging Profession: The American Library Association, 1896-1917 (1986).
- 1987. Winner, Research Paper Award, Association for Library and Information Science Education, “Censorship in Public Libraries: World War I as a Test Case.”
- 1984. Winner, Research Paper Award, Association for Library and Information Science Education (ALISE), “Establishing ALA Headquarters in Chicago: An Analysis of the Forces Which Brought the American Library Association to Chicago in 1909.”
- 1982. Co-Winner, Justin Winsor Award, Library History Round Table*, for best research paper submitted in library history, “British Propaganda in American Libraries, 1914-1917.”
- 1979-80. Selected to “Wall of Distinction,” Western Michigan University Alumni Center.

== Personal life ==
Wiegand is married to Shirley A. Wiegand and both currently reside in Walnut Creek, California.

== Bibliography ==
Books

- Wiegand, Wayne A. (2024). In Silence or Indifference: Racism and Jim Crow Segregated Public School Libraries. University Press of Mississippi.
- Wiegand, Wayne A. (2021). American Public School Librarianship: A History. Baltimore: Johns Hopkins University Press.
- Wiegand, Wayne A.; Wiegand, Shirley A. (2018). The Desegregation of Public Libraries in the Jim Crow South: Civil Rights and Local Activism. Louisiana State University Press.
- Wiegand, Wayne A. (2015). Part of Our Lives: A People's History of the American Public Library. Oxford University Press.
- Wiegand, Wayne A.; Wadsworth, Sarah (2012). "Right Here I See My Own Books:" The Woman's Building Library at the World's Columbian Exposition. University of Massachusetts Press.
- Wiegand, Wayne A. (2011). Main Street Public Library: Community Places and Reading Spaces in the Rural Heartland, 1876-1956. University of Iowa Press.
- Wiegand, Wayne A.; Wiegand, Shirley A. (2007). Books on Trial: Red Scare in the Heartland. University of Oklahoma Press.
- Wiegand, Wayne A. (1996). Irrepressible Reformer: A Biography of Melvil Dewey. American Library Association.
- Wiegand, Wayne A. (1989). "An Active Instrument for Propaganda:" The American Public Library During World War I. Greenwood Press.
- Wiegand, Wayne A. (1988). Patrician in the Progressive Era: A Biography of George von Lengerke Meyer. Garland Publishing.
- Wiegand, Wayne A. (1986). The Politics of An Emerging Profession: The American Library Association, 1876-1917. Greenwood Press.
- Wiegand, Wayne A. (1979). The History of a Hoax: Edmund Lester Pearson, John Cotton Dana, and the Old Librarian's Almanack. Beta Phi Mu.

Edited Books

- Wiegand, Wayne A. (1983). Leaders in American Academic Librarianship: 1925–1975. Beta Phi Mu.
- Wiegand, Wayne A. (1990). Supplement to the Dictionary of American Library Biography. Libraries Unlimited.
- Wiegand, Wayne A.; Davis, Donald G. Jr. (1994). Encyclopedia of Library History. Garland Publishing.
- Wiegand, Wayne A.; Danky, James P. (1998). Print Culture in a Diverse America. University of Illinois Press. ISBN 0-252-02398-6.
- Wiegand, Wayne A.; Augst, Thomas (2002). Libraries as Agencies of Culture: Print Culture History in Modern America. University of Wisconsin Press. ISBN 0-299-18304-1.
- Wiegand, Wayne A.; Lundin, Anne (2003). Defining Print Culture for Youth: The Cultural Work of Children's Literature. Libraries Unlimited.
- Wiegand, Wayne A.; Herald, Diana Tixier (2005). Genreflecting: A Guide to Popular Reading Interests (6th ed.). Libraries Unlimited. ISBN 1-59158-286-5.
- Wiegand, Wayne A.; Danky, James P. (2006). Women in Print: Essays on the Print Culture of American Women from the Nineteenth and Twentieth Centuries. University of Wisconsin Press. ISBN 0-299-21784-1.
- Wiegand, Wayne A.; Richards, Pamela Spence; Dalbello, Marija (2015). A History of Modern Librarianship: Constructing the Heritage of Cultures. Libraries Unlimited. ISBN 978-1-61069-099-7.
