= List of library and information science journals =

This list covers the journals, magazines, periodicals already published and continuing in the discipline of library and information science (LIS). It doesn't include ceased titles or predatory journals. Titles listed were taken from various scholarly sources, UGC Care and Wikipedia articles.

== LIS journal prestige as assessed by LIS faculty ==
In a 2013 article by Laura Manzari, 232 LIS faculty members from ALA-accredited information science programs ranked the most prestigious journals in library and information science. The following journals were ranked in the top ten most prestigious:

- Journal of the Association for Information Science and Technology
- The Library Quarterly
- Annual Review of Information Science and Technology
- Journal of Documentation
- Library Trends
- Library and Information Science Research
- Information Processing and Management
- Journal of Education for Library and Information Science Education
- College & Research Libraries
- First Monday (journal)

A subsequent study by Safón and Docampo in 2023 identified impactful LIS journals based on their influence on papers published in other LIS publications. Journals listed in the top ten in this study that did not appear in Manzari's list include:

- Scientometrics
- International Journal of Information Management
- Quantitative Science Studies
- MIS Quarterly
- Information and Management
- Journal of the Association for Information Systems
- Journal of Informetrics
- The Journal of Academic Librarianship

== India ==
- Annals of Library and Information Studies. (Pub: CSIR-NIScPR ), Formerly: Annals of Library Science. ISSN 0003-4835. (1954-) OPEN ACCESS
- Collnet Journal of Scientrometrics and Information Management (Pub: Taru Publications, Online through Taylor and Francis) ISSN: 0973-7766 Online 2168-930X.
- College Libraries (Pub: West Bengal College Librarians’ Association (WBCLA) ISSN 0972-1975, Quarterly
- DESIDOC Journal of Library and Information Technology (DJLIT) (Formerly: DESIDOC Bulletin 0970-8154, DESIDOC Bulletin of Information Technology. 0971-4383/0974-0643) (Pub: Defence Scientific Information & Documentation Centre) ISSN: 0974-0643, ISSN: 0976-4658 (O), Bi-monthly, OPEN ACCESS.
- Grandhalaya Sarvaswam (Bilingual: Telugu & English) [Pub: Andhra Pradesh Library Association, Vijayawada, Andhra Pradesh, India] (1915–)
- Gyankosh: Journal of Library and Information Management. (Pub: Integrated Academy Of Management And Technology. Through: Indian Journals.Com). ISSN: 2229-4023 (P), 2249-3182. Half yearly.
- IASLIC Bulletin (Pub: Indian Association of Special Libraries and Information Centres) ISSN: 0018-8411. Quarterly (1956-)
- IASLIC Newsletter (Pub: Indian Association of Special Libraries and Information Centres. (Pub: Indian Association of Special Libraries and Information Centres) ISSN 0018-845X. Monthly. (1966-)
- INFLIBNET Newsletter. (Pub: INFLIBNET). Monthly.
- Informatics Studies. (Pub: Centre For Informatics Research And Development). Quarterly. Through: Indian journals.com. ISSN: 2583-8994 (Online), 2320-530X (Print)
- ISST Journal of Advances in Librarianship (Pub:Intellectuals Society for Socio-Techno Welfare) ISSN: 0976-9021. Semiannual.
- Journal of Advanced Research in Library and Information Science. (JALIS Publishers). 4/year. ISSN 2277-2219.
- Journal of Indian Library Association (Pub: Indian Library Association). ISSN (P) 2277-5145 O) 2456-513X. Quarterly. (1965-).
- Journal of Scientometric Research. (Pub: Phcog.Net). ISSN (P) 2321-6654, (O) 2320-0057]; Frequency : Triannual.
- KELPRO Bulletin (Pub: Kerala Library Professionals' Organisation - KELPRO). ISSN 0975-4911( Print),2582-497X (O).(1993-)
- KIIT Journal of Library and Information Management (Pub: KIIT University, online through Indian Journals.com) Half yearly. ISSN: 2348-0858.
- Library Herald. (Pub: Delhi Library Association - DLA). Quarterly. ISSN: 0024-2292.
- Library Progress (International). (Pub: Bpas Publications, Through: ). Half yearly. ISSN: 0970-1052. (O) ISSN: 2320-317X. (1981-)
- Pearl: A Journal of Library and Information Science. (Pub: University Library Teacher's Association of Andhra Pradesh, Hyderabad), ISSN: 0973-7081 (print), 0975-6922 (online). Quarterly.
- RBU Journal of Library and Information Science. (Pub: Rabindra Bharati University).ISSN: 0972-2750. Annual.
- SALIS Journal of Information Management and Technology - SJIMT. (Pub: Society for the Advancement of Library and Information Science). Half-yearly. ISSN 0975-4105.
- SALIS Journal of Library and Information Science - SJLIS: an International Journal. (Pub: Society for the Advancement of Library and Information Science). Half-yearly. ISSN: 0973-3108.
- SRELS journal of Information and Knowledge (Formerly: Library Science with a Slant to Documentation, ISSN: 0024-2543; Library Science with a Slant to Documentation and Information Studies ISSN: 0970-6089; SRELS Journal of Information Management ISSN: ). Quarterly. ISSN: 2583-9314 (O)
- World Digital Libraries. Half yearly. ISSN: 0974-567X (P), 0975-7597 (O).

== Other countries ==
- African Journal of Library, Archives and Information Science
- Art Libraries Journal (Cambridge University Press)
- Bibliothèque de l'École des Chartes
- Canadian Journal of Information and Library Science
- Cataloging & Classification Quarterly
- Communications in Information Literacy
- Cataloging & Classification Quarterly
- Catholic Library Association
- Children and Libraries
- Code4Lib Journal
- College & Research Libraries
- Communications in Information Literacy
- Disability in Library and Information Studies
- Electronic Journal of Academic and Special Librarianship
- El Profesional de la Información (es) (EPI) (Formerly Information World en Español)
- Evidence Based Library and Information Practice (journal)
- Faslname-ye Ketab
- Florida Libraries. Florida Library Association.
- Georgia Library Quarterly. Quarterly. (Pub: Georgia Library Association).
- Hipertext.net
- IFLA Journal
- In the Library with the Lead Pipe
- Information & Culture
- International Journal of Information Retrieval Research (IJIRR)
- Information Processing and Management
- Information Research
- Information Sciences (journal)
- Information Services and Use
- Information Visualization (journal)
- Information, Communication & Society
- International Journal of Geographical Information Science
- Information Research: An International Electronic Journal (IR)
- Internet Research (journal)
- Issues in Science and Technology Librarianship
- Italian Journal of Library and Information Studies (JLIS.it)
- JLIS.it
- Journal of Documentation (JDoc)
- Journal of Information Ethics
- Journal of Information Science (JIS)
- Journal of Information Technology
- Journal of Informetrics
- Journal of Librarianship and Information Science
- Journal of Library & Information Studies - JLIS. (Pub: National Taiwan University)
- Journal of Library Administration
- Journal of Religious & Theological Information
- Journal of the Association for Information Science and Technology (Formerly Journal of the American Society for Information Science and Technology) (JASIST)
- Journal of the Medical Library Association
- Journal of the Canadian Health Libraries Association (Pub: Canadian Health Libraries Association).
- Knowledge Organization (journal)
- Knowledge Quest. (Pub: American Association of School Librarians)
- Library and Information Science Abstracts
- Library Literature and Information Science
- Library, Information Science & Technology Abstracts
- Library Literature and Information Science Retrospective
- Library Review (journal)
- Library Trends
- Libri (journal)
- Malaysian Journal of Library and Information Science
- MLA Forum
- New Century Library
- New Review of Children's Literature and Librarianship
- Notes (journal)
- Portal – Libraries and the Academy
- Progressive Librarian, Progressive Librarians Guild
- Reference and User Services Quarterly
- Reference Services Review
- Research Evaluation (journal)
- Scientometrics (journal)
- Serials Review
- South African Journal of Libraries and Information Science
- The Charleston Advisor
- The Christian Librarian, from the Association of Christian Librarians
- The Journal of Academic Librarianship
- The Library Quarterly (LQ)
- The Public-Access Computer Systems Review
- TripleC
- Webolog

== See also ==
- Library and information science
- List of open-access journals
