= Gloriana St. Clair =

American librarian

- Gloriana St. Clair, 2009
- Born: Gloriana Strange; 1939 (age 86–87)
- Education: University of California, Berkeley
- Occupations: Librarian and scholar

Gloriana St. Clair (born 1939) is a pioneer in the field of academic librarianship, as well as a scholar of Norse Mythology and its relationship to the works of J.R.R. Tolkien. She is currently the Principal Investigator of the Olive Executable Archive, and was previously the official University Liaison to the Pittsburgh chapter of the Osher Lifelong Learning Institute at Carnegie Mellon University. She is Dean Emerita of Carnegie Mellon University Libraries (1998-2013). Before coming to Carnegie Mellon, St. Clair held leadership positions at several other universities, including Pennsylvania State University, Texas A&M University, and the University of Oklahoma. St. Clair attended the University of California, Berkeley, receiving a bachelor's degree in English in 1962 and a master's degree in library science in 1963.

St. Clair has had a significant impact on academic librarianship, publishing articles and studies which helped reshape the field. She has served as the editor of three major journals: portal: Libraries and the Academy (2000-2003), The Journal of Academic Librarianship (1996-2000), and College & Research Libraries (1990-1996). In 2009, she was recognized by the Association of College and Research Libraries as the Academic/Research Librarian of the Year. Selected works by St. Clair are archived online in Carnegie Mellon University's Research Showcase (institutional repository). She gives much credit to her accolades to ACRL for making her be the first and only woman editor for College & Research Libraries in 1990.

Throughout her career, St. Clair has established herself as a staunch critic of academic publishers, supporting Open Access information distribution through digital publication. Her work in digitization also served as an inspiration for the Google Books project.

On December 1, 2001 St. Clair began the Million Book Project. The scope of the project was to digitize one million books for the purpose of providing around-the-clock access to digital materials (primarily in English) to anyone with internet access, regardless of socioeconomic background. The project included guardrails in order to prevent the circumvention of copyright laws for protected materials, to ensure that the books were uploaded legally and with respect to the original authors.

In 2012, St. Clair was retained by Google, Inc. to “provide [her] opinions regarding the challenges libraries and others face in identifying and finding copyright owners, and regarding the practices of libraries with respect to the digitization of books at the time Google began its Google Books project” in The Authors Guild, et al. v. Google, Inc., Civil Action No. 05 CV 8136 (DC), (S.D. NY 2012).
