= Helen Tibbo =

American archivist

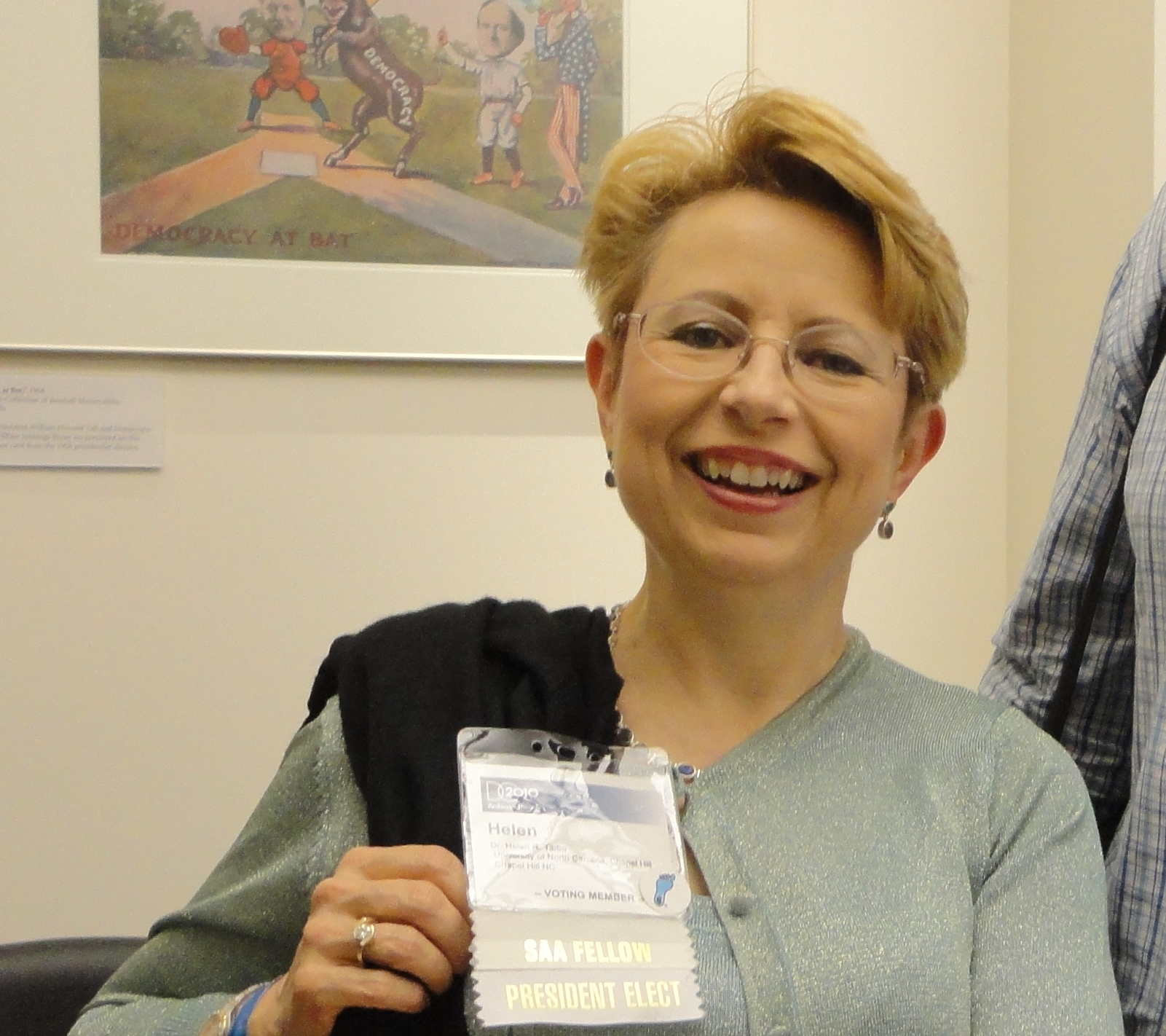
- President elect of the Society of American Archivists
- Occupation: Professor
- Known for: President of the Society of American Archivists

Helen Ruth Tibbo (born 1955) is an American archivist, professor and author writing about digital preservation in the archival profession. At the University of North Carolina, she created and directed the first American master's degree on digital curation. She is a past President of the Society of American Archivists

== Early life and education ==
Tibbo's ancestors include colonizers Miles Standish and John Alden. She attended Bridgewater State College and graduated with a BA in English in 1977. She taught junior college for several years before enrolling in graduate studies. Her Master's is in Library Science from Indiana University in 1983. She then attended the University of Maryland where she obtained an MA in American Studies and a PhD in Library and Information Science in 1989. Her doctoral dissertation was "Abstracts, Online Searching, and the Humanities".

== Career ==
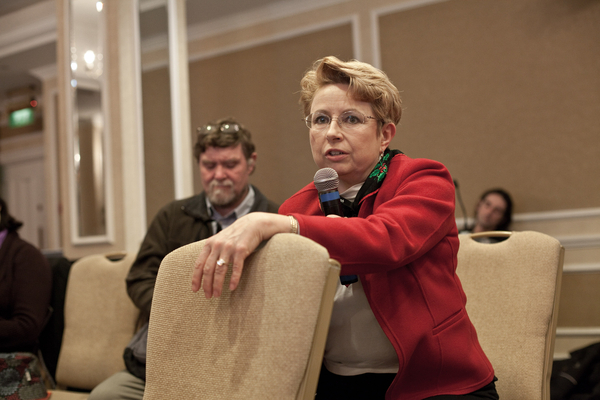
Helen Tibbo in 2011 at the International Digital Curation Conference in Bristol

Tibbo joined the University of North Carolina School of Information and Library Science in 1989 where she taught archives, digital preservation, data curation and management. In 2000, she began teaching Digital Preservation and Access, one of the first college courses to cover the topic. Four years later she was appointed co-chair of the Digital Curation/Institutional Repositories Committee at the University of North Carolina, which involved the planning of UNC's institutional digital repository.

She helped create "DigCCurr I and II" which developed the curriculum for archival graduate students. In April 2007, the DigCCurr conference brought almost 300 participants with 100 speakers from 10 countries. She also directed ESOPI-21 (Educating Stewards of Public Information in the 21st Century), which helps prepare students for work in shaping public policy and preserving government records and data. Tibbo collaborates with other universities and institutions, including the University of Michigan, the University of Toronto, Duke University, and the United Kingdom's Joint INformation Systems Committee and Digital Curation Center.

=== Professional service ===
Tibbo is a member of the Society of American Archivists (SAA) and served as SAA Vice President from 2009 to 2010 and SAA President from 2010 to 2011. She has been a member of various boards and committees, and co-founded the SAA Research Forum. Tibbo also helped create a Digital Archives Specialist certificate program and helped update the Guidelines for Graduate Professional Archival Studies.

== Awards ==
- Society of American Archivists Fellow (August 2005)
- Library of Congress Digital Pioneer (October 2001)
- Alumni Distinguished Professor at the University of North Carolina School of Information and Library Science (July 2010)
- Distinguished Alumni Award from the Indiana University-Bloomington at the School of Informatics, Computing, and Engineering (June 2018)

== Select publications ==
- "Archival Reference Knowledge," The American Archivist with Wendy Duff and Elizabeth Yakel (2013)
- "The Economic Impact of Archives: Surveys of Users of Government Archives in Canada and the United States," The American Archivist with Elizabeth Yakel, Wendy Duff, Amber Crushing and Adam Kriesberg (2012)
- "Placing the Horse before the Cart: Conceptual and Technical Dimensions of Digital Curation," Historical Social Research / Historische Sozialforschung (2012)
- "The Development, Testing, and Evaluation of the Archival Metrics Toolkits," The American Archivist with Wendy Duff, Elizabeth Yakel, Joan Cherry, Aprille McKay, Magia Krause and Rebecka Sheffield (2010)
- "Standardized tools for assessment in archives and special collections," Performance Measurement and Metrics with Elizabeth Yakel (2010)
- "The Archival Metrics Toolkit: Development and implementation," Proceedings of the American Society for Information Science and Technology with Elizabeth Yakel, Aprille McKay and Wendy Duff (2009)
- "Developing curriculum for digital libraries and digital curation education: Reflections on synergies and divergencies," ASIST with Javed Mostafa, Jeffrey Pomerantz, Jerome McDonough and Carole L. Palmer (2008)
- "The Archival Metrics Toolkit: Development and implementation," ASIST with Elizabeth Yakel, Aprille McKay, Wendy Duff and Joan M. Cherry (2008)
- "Digital Curation and Trusted Repositories: Steps Toward Success," J. Digit. Inf. with Christopher A. Lee (2007)
- "Personal Email Management on the University Digital Desktop: User Behaviors vs. Archival Best Practices," ASIST with Megan A. Winget and Kimberley Chang (2006)
- "On the nature and importance of archiving in the digital age," Advances in Computers (2003)
- "Modeling the information-seeking behavior of social scientists: Ellis's study revisited," JASIST with Lokman I. Meho (2003)
- "Archival perspectives on the emerging digital library," Communications of the ACM (2001)
- "Collaboration Services in a Participatory Digital Library: An Emerging Design," CoLIS with Diane H. Sonnenwald, Barbara M. Wildemuth, Bert J. Dempsey, Charles R. Viles and J. S. Smith (1999)
- "Freestyle vs. Boolean: A Comparison of Partial and Exact Match Retrieval Systems," Information Processing & Management with Lee Anne H. Paris (1998)
- "Review - The Art of Abstracting," Information Processing & Management (1997)
- "A Text Filter for the Automatic Identification of Empirical Articles," JASIS with Stephanie W. Haas and Jeremy Sugarman (1996)
- "Indexing for the Humanities," JASIS (1994)
