= Tefko Saracevic =

American information scientist (1930–2024)

- Born: November 24, 1930; Zagreb, Kingdom of Yugoslavia
- Died: October 5, 2024 (aged 93)
- Education: Case Western Reserve University (PhD)

Tefko Saracevic (November 24, 1930 – October 5, 2024) was a Croatian-born American information scientist who was professor emeritus at the School of Communication and Information at Rutgers University. He was a contributor to the theoretical concept of relevance and was president of the Association for Information Science and Technology.

== Early life and education ==
Saracevic was born in Zagreb, Croatia, on November 24, 1930, and came to the U.S. in 1959; becoming a naturalized citizen in 1964.

Saracevic had studied Electrical Engineering at the University of Zagreb, with equivalent to B.S. in 1957, Case Western Reserve University, Information Science M.S. in 1962, and Case Western Reserve University, Ph.D. in 1970. Dissertation: "On the concept of relevance in information science."

== Career ==
Saracevic was a member of faculty at Case Western Reserve University, Matthew A. Baxter School of Information and Library Science School: 1962–64, assistant professor, 1964–66, U.S. Office of Education fellow, 1966–70, associate professor, 1970–74, professor 1974–1985.

He was concurrently Visiting professor, Brazilian Institute for Bibliography and Documentation, Ministry of Science, Technology and Innovation (Brazil) Rio de Janeiro, 1971–77.

From 1985 to 1991, he was Professor, and from 1991 to 2010 was Professor II at the School of Communication and Information at Rutgers University. In 2010 he was honored as Professor Emeritus.

== Death ==
Saracevic died on October 5, 2024, at the age of 93.

== Professional associations and editing ==
- 1990-1991. President. American Society for Information Science and Technology.
- 1985-2008. Editor-in-Chief, Information Processing & Management.
- Advisory board, Annual Review of Information Science and Technology.

== Selected conference presentations ==
- 2015. "Why is relevance still the basic notion in information science?"International Symposium on Information Science (ISI 2015). Zadar, Croatia. May. 18-21, 2015
- 2012. "Quality of Information: Considerations for library and information services in the networked world." Keynote address at the Tenth International Conference on University Libraries held in Mexico City, Mexico, Nov. 7–10, 2012.
- 2010. "Digital natives. Digital immigrants. Libraries. The challenge faced by libraries in reaching out to borne digital." Presentation at the Biblioteca Nacional de España, Madrid, Spain. October 2010.
- 2003. "Human information behavior and digital Libraries." Information Behaviour in Digital Libraries, Bratislava, Slovakia.
- 1996. "Relevance reconsidered." Second international conference on Conceptions of Library and Information Science. Copenhagen, Denmark, 13-16 Oct. 1996.

== Awards and honors ==
- 1999. Fulbright scholar, research and lectureship at the University of Zagreb, Croatia.
- 1997. Gerard Salton Award for Excellence in Research, by the Special Interest Group on Information Retrieval, Association for Computing Machinery
- 1995. Award of Merit - Association for Information Science and Technology
- 1989. Best Paper Award, Journal of the American Society for Information Science.
- 1985. Outstanding Information Science Teacher Award from the American Society for Information Science
- National Science Foundation, Bilateral Commissions for Cooperation in Information Science and Technology between the US and: (1) USSR in 1974, (2) Mexico in 1976 and (3) Egypt in 1976.
- 1966. Outstanding Technical Contribution (with Alan M. Rees) American Documentation Institute

== Selected publications ==
- (2017). The Notion of Relevance in Information Science : Everybody Knows What Relevance Is. But, What Is It Really? Cham, Switzerland: Springer.
- (2016). Saracevic, Tefko. "Chapter 8 Relevance: In Search of a Theoretical Foundation." Theory Development in the Information Sciences, edited by Diane H. Sonnenwald, New York, USA: University of Texas Press, 2016, pp. 141–163.
- (2012). "Research on relevance in information science: A historical perspective." In; Carbo, T. & Bellardo Hahn, T. (Eds). Proceedings of the American Society for Information Science and Technology (ASIS&T) 2012 Preconference on the History of ASIS&T and Information Science and Technology. pp. 49–60.
- (2008). "Effects of inconsistent relevance judgments on information retrieval test results: A historical perspective." Library Trends, 56(4), 763–783.
- (2006). "Relevance: A Review of the Literature and a Framework for Thinking on the Notion in Information Science." Advances in librarianship 30, 3-71.
- (1997). "The stratified model of information retrieval interaction: Extension and applications." Proceedings of the American Society for Information Science, 34, 313–327.
- (1995).“Evaluation of Evaluation in Information Retrieval.” In Annual ACM Conference on Research and Development in Information Retrieval: Proceedings of the 18th Annual International ACM SIGIR Conference on Research and Development in Information Retrieval; 09-13 July 1995, 138–46.
- (1993). (with Martin Kesselman). “Trends in Biotechnology Information and Networks.” Annals of the New York Academy of Sciences 700, no. 1 (1993): 135–44.
- (1986).“Processes and Problems in Information Consolidation.” Information Processing & Management 22, no. 1 (1986): 45–60.
- (1981). Saracevic, Tefko, Judith B. Wood, and UNESCO. 1981. Consolidation of Information : A Handbook on Evaluation, Restructuring, and Repackaging of Scientific and Technical Information. Pilot ed. Paris: General Information Programme and UNISIST of the United Nations Educational, Scientific and Cultural Organization.
- (1975). "Relevance: A Review of and a framework for the thinking on the notion in information science." Journal of the American Society for Information Science, 26, (6), 321–343.
- (1970). Introduction to Information Science. New York: R.R. Bowker Co.
