= Dirk Lewandowski =

German professor of information research and information retrieval

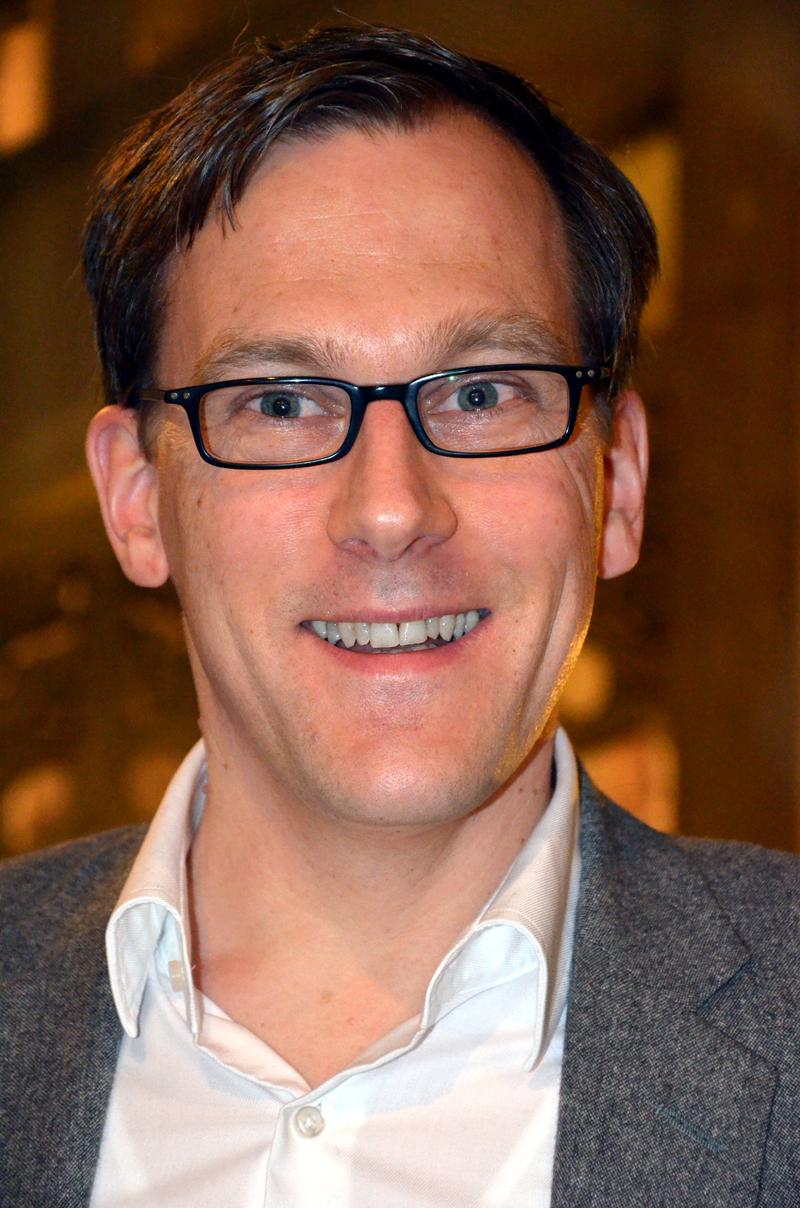
Dirk Lewandowski (2014)

Dirk Lewandowski (born 1973) is a German professor of information research and information retrieval at the Hamburg University of Applied Sciences, Germany. He also serves as an interim professor of data science at the University of Duisburg-Essen.

== Career ==
Lewandowski has a degree in library science from the School of Library Science in Stuttgart. He also studied media studies, philosophy, and information science at Heinrich Heine University in Düsseldorf. In 2005 he received his Ph.D. from Heinrich Heine University. In 2007 he was installed as professor at Hamburg University of Applied Sciences, Germany.

In 2016 he was named ACM Distinguished Speaker by the Association for Computing Machinery (ACM).

Between 2019 and 2020 he was chair of the European Chapter of the Association for Information Science and Technology (ASIS&T-EC). And from 2013 to 2020 he was editor in chief for ASLIB Journal of Information Management.

Lewandowski has served as an expert to, among others, the High Court of Justice (England and Wales) and the Deutscher Bundestag (German Parliament). He is one of the leading figures of the Open Web Index initiative, which aims at raising awareness of the need to establish an open and public index of the web.

== Research ==
Lewandowski's research concerns Web information retrieval, search engine user behaviour and the role of search engines in society. His work is published in established information science journals, including JASIST, Journal of Information Science and Journal of Documentation.

Dirk Lewandowski authored and edited several books on search engines, including "Web Search Engine Research" (Emerald Group Publishing, 2012), as well as a series of German-language handbooks on search.
