= Malaysian Journal of Library and Information Science =

- Discipline: Library science
- Language: English
- Edited by: Abrizah Abdullah

Publication details
- History: 1996–present
- Publisher: University of Malaya
- Frequency: Triannually
- Open access: Yes
- Impact factor: 0.650 (2016)

Standard abbreviations
- ISO 4: Malays. J. Libr. Inf. Sci.

Indexing
- ISSN: 1394-6234 (print); 0127-9084 (web)
- LCCN: 97642593
- OCLC no.: 833725268

Links
- Journal homepage; Journal archive

The Malaysian Journal of Library and Information Science is a triannual peer-reviewed open access academic journal covering library science. It is published by the Department of Library and Information Science of the University of Malaya and the editor-in-chief is Abrizah Abdullah (University of Malaya). Between 1996 and 2008 the journal was published both in print and electronically. Since 2009 only the electronic version has been made available.

== Abstracting and indexing ==
The journal is abstracted and indexed in Library and Information Science Abstracts, Library, Information Science & Technology Abstracts, Library Literature and Information Science, Scopus, and the Social Sciences Citation Index. According to the Journal Citation Reports, the journal has a 2016 impact factor of 0.650.
