= African Journal of Library, Archives and Information Science =

- Discipline: Library science
- Language: English
- Edited by: M.A. Tiamiyu

Publication details
- History: 1991–present
- Publisher: AJOL (Nigeria)
- Frequency: Biannually

Standard abbreviations
- ISO 4: Afr. J. Libr. Arch. Inf. Sci.

Indexing
- ISSN: 0795-4778

Links
- Journal homepage; Online access; Online archives

The African Journal of Library, Archives and Information Science is a peer-reviewed academic journal covering library science with an emphasis on the African setting. The journal is abstracted and indexed by Library Literature and Information Science and Library and Information Science Abstracts.
