= Evidence Based Library and Information Practice (journal) =

- Discipline: Library science
- Language: English

Publication details
- History: 2006–present
- Publisher: University of Alberta Library (Canada)
- Frequency: Quarterly
- Open access: Yes
- License: Creative Commons Attribution License 4.0

Standard abbreviations
- ISO 4: Evid. Based Libr. Inf. Pract.

Indexing
- ISSN: 1715-720X (print); 1715-720X (web)
- LCCN: 2006249085
- OCLC no.: 179811089

Links
- Journal homepage; Online archives

Evidence Based Library and Information Practice (EBLIP) is an open access peer-reviewed academic journal covering topics related to library and information science. It is published quarterly by the University of Alberta Library and was established in 2006. EBLIP publishes original research and commentary, as well as reviews of previously published research, on the topic of evidence based library and information practice.

== Abstracting and indexing information ==
Evidence Based Library and Information Practice is abstracted and indexed in Scopus, Library Literature and Information Science, Library, Information Science & Technology Abstracts, and Library and Information Science Abstracts, among others.

== See also ==
- Category:Library science journals
- Open access in Canada
