= Communications in Information Literacy =

- Discipline: Library Science
- Language: English
- Edited by: Stewart Brower, Christopher V. Hollister, Robert Schroeder

Publication details
- History: 2007-present
- Frequency: Biannually
- Open access: Yes
- License: Creative Commons Attribution-Non Commercial-Share Alike 2.5

Standard abbreviations
- ISO 4: Commun. Inf. Lit.

Indexing
- ISSN: 1933-5954
- LCCN: 2006214292
- OCLC no.: 863079281

Links
- Journal homepage; Online access; Online archive

Communications in Information Literacy is a biannual peer-reviewed open access academic journal covering the area of information literacy in higher education. It was established in 2007 and the editors-in-chief are Christopher V. Hollister (University at Buffalo), Allison Hosier (University at Albany), April Schweikhard (University of Oklahoma - Tulsa), and Jacqulyn Ann Williams (Virginia Commonwealth University, Qatar)

== Abstracting and indexing ==
The journal is abstracted and indexed in EBSCO databases, ERIC, Emerging Sources Citation Index, Information Science & Technology Abstracts, Library and Information Science Abstracts, ProQuest databases, and Scopus.
