= Electronic Journal of Academic and Special Librarianship =

- Discipline: Library science
- Language: English

Publication details
- Former names: Journal of Southern Academic and Special Librarianship
- Open access: Yes

Standard abbreviations
- ISO 4: Electron. J. Acad. Spec. Librariansh.

Indexing
- ISSN: 1704-8532

Links
- Journal homepage

The Electronic Journal of Academic and Special Librarianship was a peer-reviewed electronic academic journal in the areas of academic and special libraries. It published 10 volumes between 1999 and 2009.

For a decade, the journal was totally committed to the discussion and promotion of open access for all academic research. It was published and distributed by the International Consortium for the Advancement of Academic Publication. It was originally named the Journal of Southern Academic and Special Librarianship and changed its name in 2002 to reflect its international scope. The founding editor was Paul G. Haschak (Xavier University of Louisiana). The journal is permanently archived by Library and Archives Canada. During its active years, it was listed in the Directory of Open Access Journals and indexed and abstracted by Library and Information Science Abstracts and Library Literature and Information Science. It was last published in 2009.
