= David Bawden (academic) =

British information scientist

David Bawden is a British information science scholar. He is a professor in the department of Library and Information Science at City, University of London. He is editor of the Journal of Documentation and has written or coauthored several books.

== Education and career ==
Bawden received a bachelor's degree in organic chemistry from the University of Liverpool and a master's degree and PhD in information science from the University of Sheffield. His doctoral thesis, completed in 1978, was titled Substructural analysis techniques for structure–property correlation within computerised chemical information systems. He worked in industry as an information scientist for Pfizer before taking a position at City, University of London in 1990. In 2002 he became editor of the Journal of Documentation.

== Selected publications ==
=== Books ===
- Bawden, David (1990). User-Oriented Evaluation of Information Systems and Services. Aldershot: Gower. ISBN 978-0-566-05209-5.
- Aitchison, Jean; Bawden, David; Gilchrist, Alan (1997). Thesaurus Construction and Use: A Practical Manual (3rd ed.). London: ASLIB IMI. ISBN 978-0-85142-390-6.
- Bawden, David; Robinson, Lyn (2015). Introduction to Information Science. Facet Publishing. ISBN 978-1-85604-810-1.
- Pinfield, Stephen; Wakeling, Simon; Bawden, David; Robinson, Lyn (2020). Open Access in Theory and Practice: The Theory-Practice Relationship and Openness. London: Routledge. doi:10.4324/9780429276842. hdl:20.500.12657/39922. ISBN 978-0-429-27684-2. S2CID 218965825.

=== Chapters and articles ===
- Bawden, David; Holtham, Clive; Courtney, Nigel (1999). "Perspectives on information overload". ASLIB Proceedings. 51 (8): 249–255. doi:10.1108/EUM0000000006984.
- Bawden, David (2001). "Information and digital literacies: a review of concepts". Journal of Documentation. 57 (2): 218–259. doi:10.1108/EUM0000000007083. hdl:10150/105803. ISSN 0022-0418.
- Brophy, Jan; Bawden, David (2005). "Is Google enough? Comparison of an internet search engine with academic library resources". ASLIB Proceedings. 57 (6): 498–512. doi:10.1108/00012530510634235.
- Bawden, David (2008). "Origins and concepts of digital literacy". In Lankshear, Colin; Knobel, Michele (eds.). Digital Literacies: Concepts, Policies and Practices. Peter Lang. pp. 17–32. ISBN 978-1-4331-0169-4.
- Bawden, David; Robinson, Lyn (2009). "The dark side of information: overload, anxiety and other paradoxes and pathologies" (PDF). Journal of Information Science. 35 (2): 180–191. doi:10.1177/0165551508095781. S2CID 15143073.
