= Canadian Journal of Information and Library Science =

- Discipline: Library Science
- Language: English
- Edited by: Philippe Mongeon

Publication details
- Former name: Canadian Journal of Information Science
- History: 1976-present
- Publisher: Érudit on behalf of the Canadian Association for Information Science (Canada)
- Frequency: Bi-annually
- Open access: Yes (no APCs)
- Impact factor: 0.111 (2016)

Standard abbreviations
- ISO 4: Can. J. Inf. Libr. Sci.

Indexing
- CODEN: CJISEF
- ISSN: 1195-096X (print); 1920-7239 (web)
- LCCN: 94641502
- OCLC no.: 613405304

Links
- Journal homepage; OJS at OJS

The Canadian Journal of Information and Library Science is a quarterly peer-reviewed academic journal covering research findings related to library systems and services. It is published by the Érudit on behalf of the Canadian Association for Information Science. It was established in 1976 as the Canadian Journal of Information Science, obtaining its current title in 1993.

== Abstracting and indexing ==
The journal is abstracted and indexed in Current Contents/Social and Behavioral Sciences, ERIC, Information Science & Technology Abstracts, Library and Information Science Abstracts, Social Sciences Citation Index, and Scopus. According to the Journal Citation Reports, the journal has a 2014 impact factor of 0.111, ranking it 82nd out of 85 journals in the category "Information Science & Library Science."
