= Bert R. Boyce =

American library and information science professional

Bert R. Boyce is a library and information science professional, currently with faculty emeritus status for the School of Information Studies at Louisiana State University in Baton Rouge, Louisiana. He began his time at Louisiana State University as faculty beginning in 1983 and became Dean of the School of Information Studies in 1990. Previously, Boyce served as the Department Chair for Information Science within the School of Library and Informational Science at the University of Missouri, in Columbia, Missouri. In 1989, Boyce was awarded the Association for Information Science and Technology's "Outstanding Information Science Teacher" Award. Boyce, along with wife, Judith I. Boyce, endowed a professorship at Louisiana State University, the "Bert R. and Judith I. Boyce Professorship in School of Library and Information Science".

== Career and research ==
Boyce’s most notable research centers measurement and retrieval in information science, youth librarianship, and library resource access for rural communities. One of Bert R. Boyce’s most frequent collaborators in publications is his wife, Judith I. Boyce who has served as a Youth Services Librarian at West Baton Rouge Parish and a Library Director at Jefferson Parish Library in Louisiana. Bert R. and Judith Boyce wrote frequently throughout the late 1980s to mid-90s on the growth of the bookmobile as a way to provide outreach for rural libraries. Additionally, have written as advocates for subject classification in children sections of libraries rather than employing the Dewey Decimal or Library of Congress organization systems to provide clarity of interest for young patrons. Additionally, Bert R. Boyce has co-authored two Academic Press book publications. First in 1994 alongside computer scientist, Dr. Donald H. Kraft and information scientist, Dr. Charles T. Meadow titled Measurement in Information Science. Secondly, again with Kraft and Meadow, Boyce co-authored Text Information Retrieval Systems in 2007 along with information scientist Carol L. Barry.

== Notable publications ==
=== Articles ===
- Howden, N.; Boyce, B. R. (1985). "The DELTA {Distributed Electronic Library Terminal Access} Center concept: a modest proposal for the improvement of research library infrastructure". Information Technology & Libraries. 4: 236–239.
- Sievert, M. C.; Boyce, B. R. (1985). "The evaluation of a drill and practice program for online retrieval". Journal of Education for Library & Information Science. 26: 67–78. doi:10.2307/40323206.
- Wallace, D. P.; Boyce, B. R. (1987). "Computer technology and interdisciplinary efforts: a discussion and model program". Journal of Education for Library & Information Science. 27: 158–168. doi:10.2307/40323670.
- Howden, N.; Boyce, B. R. (1988). "The use of CAI in the education of online searchers". Journal of Education for Library & Information Science. 28: 201–206. doi:10.2307/40311616.
- Wallace, D. P.; Boyce, B. R.; Kraft, D. H. (1988). "Estimating effective display size in online retrieval systems". Information Processing & Management. 24 (3): 331–337. doi:10.1016/0306-4573(88)90099-4.
- Boyce, Bert R.; McCook, Kathleen de la Peña (1988). "The education of library systems analysts for the nineties". Journal of Library Administration. 9 (4): 69–76. doi:10.1300/J111v09n04_07.
- Boyce, Bert R. (1990). "Measurement of Subject Scatter in the Superintendent of Documents Classification". Government Publications Review. 17 (4): 333–339.
- Boyce, Bert R.; Stowe, M. (1991). "A Brief Investigation of U.S. Superintendent of Documents Filing Practice". Government Publications Review. 18 (4): 347–352.
- Boyce, Bert R. (1993). "All Sides on Supply-Side". American Libraries. 24 (8): 701.
- Boyce, Bert R. (1993). "Meeting the Serials Cost Problem: A Supply-Side Proposal". American Libraries. 24 (3): 272–273.
- Boyce, Bert R. (1994). "On My Mind: The Death of Library Education". American Libraries. 25 (3): 257–259.
- Boyce, J. I.; Boyce, B. R. (1995). "Library Outreach Programs in Rural Areas". Library Trends. 31 (5): 50–52.
- Boyce, Bert R. (1996). "On My Mind: Copyright Could Be Wrong". American Libraries. 27 (2): 27–28.
- Boyce, Judith I.; Boyce, Bert R. (2000). "Far From the Library, a Special Set of Challenges". American Libraries. 31 (5): 50–52. ISSN 0002-9769.
- Boyce, Bert R.; Boyce, Judith I. "A Reexamination of Shelf Organization for Children's Books". Public Libraries. 41 (5): 280–283.

=== Books ===
- Kraft, D. H.; Meadow, C. T.; Boyce, Bert R. (1994). Measurement in Information Science. Cambridge, MA: Academic Press. ISBN 0121214508.
- Boyce, B. R.; Kraft, D. H.; Barry, C. L.; Meadow, C. T. (2007). Text Information Retrieval Systems (3rd ed.). Cambridge, MA: Academic Press. ISBN 0124874053.

=== Reports ===
- Boyce, J. I.; Boyce, B. R. (1988). "Buying a bookmobile: some commonsense guidelines". Wilson Library Bulletin. 62: 51–56.
