= Tatjana Aparac-Jelušić =

Croatian librarian

- Born: October 7, 1948 (age 78); Osijek, SFR Yugoslavia
- Occupation: Librarian

Academic background
- Education: University of Zagreb

Tatjana Aparac-Jelušić (born October 7, 1948) is a Croatian librarian and professor of librarianship. She is currently retired and was, formerly, Professor at the Department of Librarianship, Faculty of Education, University of Osijek and Professor at the Department of Information Sciences, Faculty of Humanities and Social Sciences, University of Zagreb, and Professor at the Department of Information Sciences (former Department of Librarianship) at the University of Zadar.

Aparac-Jelušić was born in 1948 in Osijek, where she completed her elementary education. She moved to Zagreb, where she finished high school and graduated from the Faculty of Humanities and Social Sciences. In 1991, she received her Ph.D. in information science.

In 2006 she won an award for teachers of information science—Thompson ISI's Outstanding Information Science Teacher of the Year—from the American Society for Information Science and Technology (ASIST). She was the first non-American to receive the award in its 26-year history.

She is a member of the Programme Committees of a number of domestic professional conferences and seminars; chair, Organising Committee of the CoLIS3 International conference, co-director of the International Seminars Libraries in the Digital Age – LIDA (2000, 2001, 2002)

She has written more than 60 professional papers, reviews and notes, and has edited 16 books in the field of library and information science.

Editor of the publication Velimir Deželić: Visionary and the Leader of the Croatian Librarianship in the First Decades of the 20th Century in Croatian Librarians Vol. 3 (Hrvatski Knjižničari Knjiga 3.) by Dora Sečić, 2014.

She coordinated two European Eramus+ projects Cooperation Partnership. European Information Science Education: Encouraging Mobility and Learning Outcomes Harmonization (EINFOSE) with partners of the Högskolan i Borås in Sweden, Stiftung Universität Hildesheim in Germany, Universität Graz, Austria, Univerza v Ljubljani in Slovenia, Universitá di Pisa in Italy, Universitat de Barcelona in Spain and Hacettepe Universitezi in Turkey. The other project was Digital Education for Crisis Situations: Times when there is no alternative (DECRIS).
