= Susan Martin (disambiguation) =

Susan Martin (born 1950) is an American academic administrator.

Susan Martin may also refer to:

- Susan Martin (politician), American politician
- Susan K. Martin (born 1942), American librarian
- Susan Martin (Days of Our Lives), a fictional character on the TV series Days of Our Lives from 1966 to 1976
