= College & Research Libraries =

- Discipline: Library Science
- Language: English
- Edited by: Wendi Arant Kaspar

Publication details
- History: 1939-present
- Publisher: Association of College and Research Libraries (United States)
- Frequency: Bimonthly
- Open access: Yes
- Impact factor: 1.626 (2017)

Standard abbreviations
- ISO 4: Coll. Res. Libr.

Indexing
- ISSN: 0010-0870
- LCCN: 42016492
- OCLC no.: 2354797

Links
- Journal homepage; Online access; Online archive

College & Research Libraries is a bimonthly peer-reviewed academic journal published by the Association of College and Research Libraries.

== History ==
It was established in December 1939 under the editorship of Augustus Frederick Kuhlman, followed by Carl M. White who was editor from 1941–1948. It was published quarterly for its first 18 years, then bimonthly since 1956.

It publishes articles intended to help academic librarians build an intellectual framework to serve the needs of collegiate users. The current editor in chief is Kristen Totleben (University of Rochester). The previous editor-in-chief was Wendi Arant Kaspar (Texas A&M University Policy Sciences and Economics Library). The journal is open access since 2011.

== Abstracting and indexing information ==
The journal is abstracted and indexed in Scopus, Social Sciences Citation Index, America: History and Life, Academic Search Premier, FRANCIS, PASCAL, EBSCO Education Source, Educational research abstracts (ERA), Information Science and Technology Abstracts, Library and Information Science Abstracts, Library Literature and Information Science, and MLA - Modern Language Association Database.

According to Journal Citation Reports, the journal has a 2017 impact factor of 1.626, ranking it 36th out of 88 journals in the category "Information Science & Library Science".

== See also ==
- Category:Library science journals
