= Ben-Ami Lipetz =

American information scientist (1927–2019)

Ben-Ami Lipetz (March 14, 1927 – October 9, 2019) was an American researcher and professor of information science. Lipetz was born in Fargo, North Dakota and grew up in New York City. He attended the Bronx High School of Science.

His research focused on information science, specifically relating to citation indexing, and was involved in the information science field, helping to established doctoral programs and a foundation to further the field.

== Career and education ==
=== Education ===
Lipetz attended Cornell University on a scholarship and studied mechanical engineering, graduating in 1948 after serving in the navy for a year in 1945. Lipetz obtained his graduate degree in public administration and research administration at Cornell in 1953, with his PhD being awarded in 1959. He went on to work on several projects at various institutions on the creation of indexes, including the Science Citation Index (now known as the Science Citation Index Expanded).

=== Teaching ===
In 1966 Ben-Ami Lipetz worked at Yale University Library working on integrating computers into the library system, and in 1967 was named head of the library's research department.

In 1978, Lipetz began his work as a professor after being hired by the University at Albany to be a professor and director of the School of Library Science (later renamed the School of Information Science). While there, he founded an information science Doctoral program. He retired in 1995 but continued to stay active by serving as a board member on the Friends of the Libraries at University at Albany.

== Legacy ==
Lipetz died on October 9, 2019.

Ben-Ami Lipetz's estate donated a $1.15 million endowment to support the annual Ben-Ami Lipetz Conference: New Trends in informatics Research (NTIR) which is an annual conference held at University at Albany focused on promoting and discussing issues in the information science community. In the years preceding his death, Lipetz also established the non-profit called The Foundation for Information Resources, Science, and Technology focusing on supporting and funding publication of research.

== Notable works ==
- Lipetz, Ben-Ami (April 1965). "Improvement of the selectivity of citation indexes to science literature through inclusion of citation relationship indicators". American Documentation. 16 (2): 81–90. doi:10.1002/asi.5090160207. ISSN 0096-946X.
- Lipetz, Ben-Ami (June 1970). User Requirements in Identifying Desired Works in Large Library (Report). U. S. Department of Health, Education and Welfare. ERIC ED042479.
- Lipetz, Ben-Ami (1999). "Aspects of JASIS authorship through five decades". Journal of the American Society for Information Science. 50 (11): 994–1003. doi:10.1002/(SICI)1097-4571(1999)50:11%3C994::AID-ASI5%3E3.0.CO;2-U.
- William, Robert W.; Lipetz, Ben-Ami (2005). Covert and Overt: Recollecting and Connecting Intelligence Service and Information Science. American Society for Information Science and Technology. ISBN 978-1-57387-234-8.
