= Issues in Science and Technology Librarianship =

- Discipline: Library science
- Language: English
- Edited by: Sarah Tribelhorn and Hannah Lee

Publication details
- History: 1991-present
- Frequency: Rolling
- Open access: Yes
- License: CC BY

Standard abbreviations
- ISO 4: Issues Sci. Technol. Librariansh.

Indexing
- CODEN: ISTLF9
- ISSN: 1092-1206
- LCCN: sn96003546
- OCLC no.: 26773387

Links
- Journal homepage; Online access; Online archive

Issues in Science and Technology Librarianship (ISTL) is a quarterly peer-reviewed open access academic journal covering issues of interest to science and technology librarians. Since 1991, Issues in Science and Technology Librarianship is an open access, peer-reviewed journal that publishes substantive content of interest to science and technology librarians. It serves as a vehicle for sci-tech librarians to share successful initiatives and innovative ideas, and to publish peer-reviewed or board-accepted papers, including case studies, practical applications, theoretical essays, and research papers relevant to the functions and operations of science and technology libraries in all settings. Through its columns ISTL also publishes web/bibliographies, reviews, opinions, and best practices. ISTL is a publication of the Association of college and Research Libraries, Science and Technology Section (ACRL/STS).

== History ==
ISTL was established in 1991 and the editor-in-chief is Andrea L. Duda (University of California, Santa Barbara). Michael Fosmire (Purdue University) became acting editor-in-chief until Edward Eckel's (Western Michigan University) took over the publication in March 2021. In mid-2025, Eckel decided to step down as editor-in-chief. Sarah Tribelhorn (San Diego State University) and Hannah Lee (California State University, Dominguez Hills) became co-editor-in-chiefs in July 2025.

The journal began as a print publication but eventually moved to an online publication in 1997. Themed issues for the journal began with the Spring 1997 issue (no. 14) until Winter 2009 (no 56). Refereed articles became a part of the journal with the Summer 2000 issue with Buffy Choinski (University of Mississippi) as the editor of the section. In 2019, the journal moved migrated to the University of Alberta Libraries Open Journal Systems (OJS)

On September 30, 2026, the journal updated its logo.

== Abstracting and indexing ==
The journal is abstracted and indexed in the following

- Directory of Open Access Journals (DOAJ)
- Inspec
- Library and Information Science Abstracts
- ProQuest databases
- Scopus.
