= Susan K. Martin =

American librarian (born 1942)

- Born: Susan Katherine Orowan; 1942 (age 83–84); Cambridge, England
- Citizenship: United States
- Education: Tufts University Simmons College University of California, Berkeley
- Occupation: Librarian
- Employer(s): Harvard University Johns Hopkins University; Drexel University; National Commission on Libraries and Information Science Georgetown University
- Father: Egon Orowan

Susan Katherine Martin (born 1942) is an American librarian. She has worked as a university librarian and was executive director of the National Commission on Libraries and Information Science.

== Early life ==
Martin was born in Cambridge, England in 1942. Her parents were pianist Jolan (née Schonfeld) and Egon Orowan, a native of Budapest, Hungary. Both of her parents fled Nazi Germany because of their Jewish ancestry, reuniting and marrying in England. Her family moved to Belmont, Massachusetts in the United States in 1950, and she became a naturalized citizen in 1961. Her father was a noted professor of mechanical engineering at the Massachusetts Institute of Technology.

She graduated from Belmont High School in 1959. Martin attended Tufts University, graduating with a B.A. in romance languages in 1963. She received a Master of Library Science from Simmons College in 1965. She interned at the Harvard College Library from 1963 to 1965.

She attended the University of California, Berkeley, receiving a Ph.D. in library and information science in 1983.

== Career ==
Martin worked as a systems librarian at Harvard University from 1963 to 1973. She was the head of library systems office at Berkeley at the University of California, Berkeley Libraries from 1973 to 1979.

She was the director of the Milton S. Eisenhower Library at Johns Hopkins University from 1979 to 1988.

In 1984, Martin was the Samuel Lazerow distinguished lecturer at Drexel University

She was the executive director National Commission on Libraries and Information Science from 1988 to 1990. For this position, she was responsible for developing legislation and advising the executive and legislative branches about the needs of the libraries. She also directed and planned national library and information science programs with state, local, and private organization.

Martin was the university librarian of Georgetown University from 1990 to 2001.

In 2001, she became the president of SKM Associates, a library management consulting firm. In September 2002, she became a part-time visiting program officer for scholarly communications with the Association of College and Research Libraries.

Martin became a fellow in the Council on Library Resources in 1973.

In 1994, she was elected president of the Association of College and Research Libraries.

She was also president of Library and Information Technology Association and the Universal Serials and Book Exchange.

She was an American Library Association delegate to the Soviet Union in November 1976.

Martin has written numerous articles and monographs on library automation.

She was the editor of the Journal of Library Automation from 1973 to 1977 and was on the board of consultants for Library Issues: Briefings for Faculty and Administrators.

== Awards and honors ==
Martin received the Simmons College Distinguished Alumni Award in 1977. When she retired from Georgetown in 2001, members of the Library Advisory Council established The Susan K. Martin Fund for Innovative Information Technologies in her honor. In addition, Thomas J. Healey family established The Susan K. Martin, Ph.D., Fund for Science Fiction Award Collections at Georgetown in her honor in 2001.

== Personal life ==
She married David S. Martin of New Bedford, Massachusetts in June 1962. He was the dean of School of Education at Galludaet University. She became one of the first female members of the Cosmos Club in 1988. She donated her father's papers to the Massachusetts Institute of Technology Libraries.

== Selected publications ==
- "The Use of Hypertext for Orientation: the NCLIS Approach". Essen Symposium. pp. 57–69, 1989.
- Library Networks, 1986-87: Libraries in Partnership (Professional Librarian Series). Boston: G. K. Hall, 1986. ISBN 978-0867291278
- Keeping the Pace with the Users". The Journal of Academic Librarianship, vol. 20, no. 4 (September 1994): 225-225.
- "The Profession and Its Leaders: Mutual Responsibilities". The Journal of Academic Librarianship, vol. 22, no. 5 (September 1996)
- "Clinging to ''Status: The Attitude of Librarians to the Non-MLS Staff". The Journal of Academic Librarianship, vol. 23, no. 3 (May 1997)
- "The Changing Role of the Library Director: Fund-raising and the Academic Library". The Journal of Academic Librarianship, vol. 24, no. 1(January 1998): 3-10.
- "A New Kind of Audience". The Journal of Academic Librarianship, vol. 24, no. 6 (November 1998): 469-469.
- Martin, Susan K. (1998). "Anticipating the Future from the Successes of the Past". In Lee, Susan A. (ed.). The New Library Legacy: Essays in Honor of Richard DeGennaro. Berlin; Boston: K. G. Saur. pp. 59–74. doi:10.1515/9783110955682.59.
- "Visions - When Vision Encounters Reality: A Professional Dilemma". The Journal of Academic Librarianship, vol. 25, no. 3 (May 1999).
- "Academic Library Fund-Raising: Organization, Process, and Politics". Library Trends vol. 48, no. 3 (2000). ISBN 9781315116143
- Martin, Susan K. (2002). Insuring and valuing research library collections: a SPEC kit. SPEC Kit. Vol. 272. Washington, D.C.: Association of Research Libraries, Office of Leadership and Management Services. p. 86. ISSN 0160-3582. OCLC 51580126.
- Martin, S. K. (2002). "The Transformation of Library Networks". portal: Libraries and the Academy. 2 (2): vii–x. doi:10.1353/pla.2002.0039.
