= General Music Today =

- Discipline: Music
- Language: English
- Edited by: Shelly Cooper

Publication details
- History: 1991-present
- Publisher: SAGE Publications
- Frequency: Triannually

Standard abbreviations
- ISO 4: Gen. Music Today

Indexing
- ISSN: 1048-3713
- LCCN: 89656549
- OCLC no.: 423575361

Links
- Journal homepage; Online access; Online archive

General Music Today is a triannual peer-reviewed academic journal that covers the field of music. The journal's editor-in-chief is Shelly Cooper (University of Arizona). It was established in 1991 and is currently published by SAGE Publications in association with the National Association for Music Education.

== Abstracting and indexing ==
General Music Today is abstracted and indexed in:

- Academic Complete
- Academic Premier
- Education Research Complete
- ERIC
- Expanded Academic ASAP
- Wilson Education Index/Abstracts
