= Canadian Association for Information Science =

Professional library organization

- L'Association canadienne des sciences de l'information
- Abbreviation: CAIS/ACSI
- Formation: 1971
- Type: Information and library science association
- Legal status: Active
- Purpose: Advocate and public voice, educator and network
- Headquarters: Web
- Region served: Canada
- Official language: English, French
- Website: https://www.cais-acsi.ca/

The Canadian Association for Information Science (L'Association canadienne des sciences de l'information), also known as CAIS, is a Canadian society that promotes the advancement of information science in Canada, and encourages and facilitates the exchange of information relating to the use, access, retrieval, organization, management, and dissemination of information. It is a bilingual (English/French) association with the French name L'Association canadienne des sciences de l'information, also known as ACSI. Established in 1971, the association publishes a quarterly journal, the Canadian Journal of Information and Library Science (CJILS), and sponsors an annual conference. The association's website provides information about past and future conferences and access to conference proceedings. CAIS members include information scientists and archivists, librarians, computer scientists, documentalists, economists, educators, journalists, psychologists, and others who support its objectives.

== History ==
The Computing and Data Processing Society of Canada, formed in 1958, was the first professional association for information technology professionals in Canada. In 1968, it became the Canadian Information Processing Society (CIPS). Canadians who were interested in broader aspects of managing and using information joined the American Society of Information Science (ASIS).

In 1969, a group of Ottawa ASIS members met with the intention of forming an Ottawa chapter of ASIS. Some members argued that to represent Canada adequately at the international level, a Canadian association was needed. By the next year, letters patent incorporating the Canadian Association for Information Science were granted, and CAIS was formally operational in early 1971. The first conference was held in 1973. Modelling itself on larger associations such as ASIS, the initial structure included active chapters across the country. Ultimately this structure proved to be unsustainable in the relatively small population of information scientists in Canada, and the last remaining chapter closed in the early 1990s. Since then, the association has functioned as a single national association serving members through its journal and annual conferences.

== Membership ==
In the 1970s, members were often computer scientists and other practitioners from industry and government, with only a sprinkling of academics. Corporate and government people were involved in early days of information technology implementation, and membership provided a means of learning new developments and exchanging experiences. In the mid-1980s, the association evolved into a more academic (learned) society. Today the membership is heavily weighted to academics from the library and information science faculties at Canadian universities. Membership in CAIS is automatic for all who attend the annual conference, and includes a subscription to the Canadian Journal of Information and Library Science. Membership can also be purchased by subscribing to the journal through the University of Toronto Press website.

== Conferences ==
Starting in 1973, the annual conferences have provided a venue for discussion and information exchange. For the first decade, the meetings were generally held in hotels, but since 1985, they have been held at universities, reflecting the changing nature of membership. The early conferences, directed at IT professionals, included vendor displays and private sector sponsorship.

Simultaneous translation was provided, but federal or provincial funding assistance dried up, forcing the association to drop the service in 1985. Currently, papers continue to be given either in English or French; it is assumed that audience members can understand both languages.

In the 1970s and early 1980s, speakers were often practitioners from industry and government. Papers were not usually submitted in advance; proceedings were published and distributed after the conference. Through the 1980s, as the membership became more academic, the conference also evolved. Conference papers became more research focussed rather than practitioner oriented. Abstracts of papers began to be evaluated by a conference committee, and accepted papers were submitted in advance, so that published proceedings could be distributed at the conference. Some experiments in issuing proceedings in microfiche or audio tape proved unpopular, and proceedings were generally published on paper until 2003. Since 2004, the proceedings have been published in advance on the CAIS-ACSI website. Retroactive digitization of earlier conferences is ongoing.

In 1997, the association began to hold most conferences in conjunction with the Canadian Federation for the Humanities and Social Sciences' annual Congress of the Social Sciences and Humanities.

== Publications ==
CAIS-ACSI has been publishing since its inception, and even before the letters patent were issued, the first two issues of a projected quarterly journal entitled Information Science in Canada appeared in the winter and spring of 1970. For lack of sufficient subscribers, the journal ceased after production of its second issue.

From 1971 to 1983, CAIS published 25 numbers of a newsletter intended for ephemeral or time related information, covering recent developments.

In 1976, the association began publishing the Canadian Journal of Information Science / La Revue canadienne des sciences de l'information, as an annual publication directed at IT and library practitioners. The journal became a peer reviewed quarterly beginning with volume 12 in 1986. In 1993, with volume 18, the title was changed to Canadian Journal of Information and Library Science / La Revue canadienne des sciences de l'information et de bibliothéconomie (CJILS). The change of name occurred when the Canadian Library Association ceased publishing the Canadian Library Journal. In 1987, with volume 12, the association began publishing CJILS with the University of Toronto Press (UTP).
