= Evidence-based library and information practice =

Decisions and practices that use evidence to make decisions

Evidence-based library and information practice (EBLIP) or evidence-based librarianship (EBL) is the use of evidence-based practices (EBP) in the field of library and information science (LIS). This means that all practical decisions made within LIS should 1) be based on research studies and 2) that these research studies are selected and interpreted according to some specific norms characteristic for EBP. Typically such norms disregard theoretical studies and qualitative studies and consider quantitative studies according to a narrow set of criteria of what counts as evidence. If such a narrow set of methodological criteria are not applied, it is better instead to speak of research based library and information practice.

== Characteristics ==
Evidence-based practice in general has been characterised as a positivist approach; EBLIP is therefore also a positivist approach to LIS. As such, EBLIP is an approach in contrast to other approaches to LIS. The use of statistical approaches known as meta-analysis to conclude what evidence has been reported in the literature is one among other methods which is typical for the evidence-based approach.

In 2002, Booth noted the three schools of EBILP had some commonalities, including the context of day-to-day decision-making, an emphasis on improving the quality of professional practice, a pragmatic focus on the 'best available evidence', incorporation of the user perspective, the acceptance of a broad range of quantitative and qualitative research designs, and access, either first-hand or second-hand, to the (process of) evidence-based practice and its products. He added one more, that EBILP is concerned with getting the best value for money.

== The role of library and information science in EBP ==
Evidence-based practice in general is based on a very thorough search of the scientific literature and a very thorough selection and analysis of the retrieved literature. A close familiarity with database searching is needed, and library and information professionals have important roles to play in this respect. Therefore LIS professionals should be well suited to help professionals in other disciplines doing EBP. EBLIP is the application of this approach on LIS itself. It should be mentioned, however, that EBP started in medicine as evidence-based medicine (EBM) from which it spread to other fields. Only slowly and to a limited extent has EBP moved on to LIS. The EBLIP process can be applied to a variety of scenarios in LIS, including customer service, collection development, library management and information literacy instruction. In general, quantitative methods are used in LIS research.

A 2010 study revealed five categories that capture the different ways library and information professionals experience evidence-based practice:

1. Evidence-based practice is experienced as irrelevant;
2. Evidence-based practice is experienced as learning from published research;
3. Evidence-based practice is experienced as service improvement;
4. Evidence-based practice is experienced as a way of being;
5. Evidence-based practice is experienced as a weapon.

== See also ==
- Evidence Based Library and Information Practice (journal)
- Evidence-based practices
- Meta-analysis
- Systematic review
