= Lipetz =

Lipetz is a surname. Notable people with the surname include:

- Ben-Ami Lipetz (1927–2019), American information scientist
- Frances Chaney (née Lipetz; 1915–2004), Ukrainian-American actress
- Marcia J. Lipetz (1947–2018), American sociologist
- Shlomo Lipetz (born 1979), Israeli baseball player
