= Research Studies in Music Education =

- Discipline: Performing Arts
- Language: English
- Edited by: Julie Ballantyne

Publication details
- History: 1993-present
- Publisher: SAGE Publications (United Kingdom)
- Frequency: Tri-annually

Standard abbreviations
- ISO 4: Res. Stud. Music Educ.

Indexing
- ISSN: 1321-103X (print); 1834-5530 (web)
- LCCN: 96034078 sn 96034078
- OCLC no.: 30888865

Links
- Journal homepage; Online access; Online archive

Research Studies in Music Education is a peer-reviewed academic journal that publishes papers three times a year in the field of Music Education. The journal's editor is Julie Ballantyne (University of Queensland). It has been in publication since 1993 and is currently published by SAGE Publications on behalf of Society for Education, Music and Psychology Research.

== Scope ==
Research Studies in Music Education provides a forum for the dissemination and discussion of research in music and music education. The journal aims to encourage the interrogation and development of a range of research methodologies and their application to diverse topics in music education, theory and practice.

== Abstracting and indexing ==
Research Studies in Music Education is abstracted and indexed in the following databases:

- Australian Education Index
- Educational Research Abstracts Online
- ERIC
- IBZ: International Bibliography of Periodical Literature
- PsycINFO
- SCOPUS
