= Information Services & Use =

Computer science journal

- Discipline: Information science, information management, artificial intelligence, library science
- Language: English
- Edited by: Brady D. Lund

Publication details
- History: 1981–present
- Publisher: Sage Publishing
- Frequency: Quarterly

Standard abbreviations
- ISO 4: Inf. Serv. Use

Indexing
- CODEN: ISUSDX
- ISSN: 0167-5265 (print); 1875-8789 (web)
- OCLC no.: 41949073

Links
- Journal homepage; Online access; Online archive

Information Services & Use is a peer-reviewed scientific journal covering the area of information technology, especially information management and applications. Its current editor-in-chief is Brady Lund. The journal was established in 1981 and is published by Sage Publishing and IOS Press.

== Journal Description ==
The journal publishes research on a broad range of topics within the discipline of information science and technology, including electronic publishing, library automation, online and offline information systems, artificial intelligence, human-computer interaction, and education and training for the information professions. The journal's coverage includes both the organizations that provide information services and the practical application of information in business and scientific settings, with attention to topics such as the organization of information, transformation techniques, media, and the economics of information services.

== Abstracting and indexing ==
Information Services & Use is abstracted and indexed in:

- ACM Computing Reviews
- ACM Guide to Computing Literature
- Cambridge Scientific Abstracts
- Computer Abstracts
- Computer Literature Index
- EBSCO databases
- Educational Research Abstracts
- Information Reports & Bibliographies
- Information Science & Technology Abstracts
- Inspec
- Internet & Personal Computing Abstracts
- Library and Information Science Abstracts
- Scopus
