= JRTI =

JRTI may refer to:

- James Rumsey Technical Institute (JRTI), Martinsburg, West Virginia, USA
- Judicial Research and Training Institute (JRTI), a legal education institution in South Korea
- Just Read the Instructions (JRtI), an autonomous spaceport drone ship of SpaceX
- Journal of Religious & Theological Information, a theology journal
