= Stephen Sawyer =

Stephen Sawyer may refer to:

- Stephen S. Sawyer, (born 1952) – American commercial illustrator
- Steven Burton Sawyer – American information science professor
- Steve Sawyer (environmentalist), (1956–2019) – American environmentalist and activist.
- Steven Sawyer, South African surfer
