= Reference Services Review =

- Discipline: Library Science
- Language: English
- Edited by: Ann Manning Fiegen

Publication details
- History: 1973–present
- Publisher: Emerald Group Publishing (United States)
- Frequency: Quarterly

Standard abbreviations
- ISO 4: Ref. Serv. Rev.

Indexing
- ISSN: 0090-7324

Links
- Journal homepage

Reference Services Review is a quarterly peer-reviewed academic journal published by Emerald Group Publishing, who acquired it from Pierian Press in 1998. The journal covers case studies and conceptual papers in all aspects of reference and user services.

== Abstracting & Indexing ==
The journal is abstracted and indexed in Education Full Text, Information Science & Technology Abstracts, Library and Information Science Abstracts (LISA), and Scopus.
