= Developmental Disabilities Research Reviews =

- Language: English
- Edited by: Marilee C. Allen, Marc Yudkoff

Publication details
- Former names: Mental Retardation and Developmental Disabilities Research Reviews
- Frequency: Quarterly
- Impact factor: 2.75 (2014)

Standard abbreviations
- ISO 4: Dev. Disabil. Res. Rev.

Indexing
- ISSN: 1940-5510 (print); 1940-5529 (web)
- OCLC no.: 175296472

Developmental Disabilities Research Reviews (titled Mental Retardation and Developmental Disabilities Research Reviews before 2008) was a peer reviewed quarterly review journal published by John Wiley and Sons since 1995. It addresses itself to "neuroscientists, geneticists, neurodevelopmental pediatricians, and behavioral scientists interested in clinical or basic science research in aspects of brain development and function." It ceased publication in 2014.

The review is abstracted in the major relevant indices, including Medline and ERIC.
