= Elizabeth Yakel =

Archivist, researcher, and educator in information science

- Born: 1960 (age 65–66)

Academic background
- Education: Michigan (Ph.D., A.M.L.S.); Brown (A.B.)
- Thesis: Recordkeeping in Radiology: The Relationships Between Activities and Records in Radiological Processes (1997)
- Doctoral advisor: Margaret Hedstrom; Francis X. Blouin

Academic work
- Discipline: Library and information science
- Sub-discipline: Archives; digital preservation
- Institutions: Michigan (2000–); University of Pittsburgh (1997–2000)
- Main interests: Data reuse; teaching with primary sources; archival description; development of standardized metrics to enhance repository processes and the user experience

Elizabeth Yakel is an archivist, researcher, and educator in information science. Yakel is known for work advancing archival practice, the use of primary sources in archives education, studies of data reuse practices, and digital curation. Yakel is the senior associate dean for academic affairs and a professor at the University of Michigan School of Information, where she has been on the faculty since 2000. She is the former coordinator of the Preservation of Information specialization in the Master of Science in Information program and teaches in the Archives and Record Management area. She specializes in digital archives and digital preservation and has developed five such graduate level courses at UM, including "Economics of Sustainable Digital Information" and "Practical Engagement Workshop in Digital Preservation."

== Education ==
She holds an A.B. from Brown University (1980), an A.M.L.S. from the University of Michigan (1982), and a Ph.D. from the University of Michigan (1997). Her dissertation, Recordkeeping in Radiology: The Relationships Between Activities and Records in Radiological Processes, won the 1997 Eugene Garfield Doctoral Dissertation Award from the Association of Library and Information Science Educators (ALISE). After graduation, she became an assistant professor at the University of Pittsburgh School of Information Sciences from 1997 to 2000 before returning to her alma mater.

== Notable research projects ==
- 2015-2018: Research Experience for Master’s Students (REMS); principal investigator; funded by Institute of Museum and Library Services (IMLS) Laura Bush 21st Century Librarian Program.
- 2014-2017: Qualitative Data Reuse; principal investigator; funded by IMLS grant.
- 2010-2014: Dissemination Information Packages for Information Reuse (DIPIR); co-principal investigator; funded by IMLS National Leadership Grant for Libraries.
- 2010-2012: Preservation and Access Virtual Education Laboratory (PAVEL) for Digital Humanities; co-principal investigator; funded by National Endowment for the Humanities (NEH) Preservation and Access Education and Training Program.
- 2009-2011: Archival Metrics and User Evaluation for Government Archives; principal investigator; funded by a National Archives and Records Administration (NARA) grant.
- 2008–present: Archival and Education Research Initiative (AERI); founding member & co-principal investigator; funded from 2008-2016 by IMLS Laura Bush 21st Century Librarian Program.
- 2008-2012: Engaging Communities to Foster Internships for Preservation and Digital Curation; principal investigator; funded by IMLS Laura Bush 21st Century Librarians Program.

== Awards and honors ==
- 2013: International Digital Curation Conference Best Research Paper Award for “Trust in Digital Repositories” (with Ixchel Faniel, Adam Kriesberg, and Ayoung Yoon).
- 2012: UM School of Information Michael D. Cohen Outstanding Service Award.
- 2012: iConference Best Paper Award for “Managing Fixity and Fluidity in Data Repositories” (with Morgan Daniels, Ixchel Faniel, and Kathleen Fear).
- 2008-09: Committee on Institutional Cooperation Academic Leadership Program Fellowship (CIC is now the Big Ten Academic Alliance).
- 2008: SAA Fellows' Ernst Posner Award for “Interaction in Virtual Archives: The Polar Bear Expedition Digital Collections" (with Magia Ghetu Krause).
- 2007: SAA Fellows' Ernst Posner Award for “Special Section on Archival Census and Educational Needs Survey in the United States” (A*CENSUS Working Group member).
- 2006: Summer Institute for Nursing Informatics Sharon Coleman Memorial Scholarship Award for the "HANDS Project and Vision for Nursing Informatics" (with Gail Keenan and Dana Tschannen).
- 2005: American Medical Informatics Association Harriet H. Werley Award for “Promoting Safe Nursing Care by Bringing Visibility to the Disciplinary Aspects of Interdisciplinary Care” (with Gail Keenan).
- 2004: OCLC/ALISE Library and Information Science Research Grant.
- 2003: ALISE Research Grant.
- 1999: Elected Society of American Archivists (SAA) Fellow.
- 1999: SAA C.F.W. Coker Award for Description for Vatican Archives: An Inventory & Guide to the Historical Records of the Holy See.
- 1997: ALISE Eugene Garfield Doctoral Dissertation Award.
- 1996-97: Blue Cross Blue Shield of Michigan Foundation Student Award Program Grant.
- 1994: UM Bentley Historical Library Research Fellowship Program for the Study of Modern Archives.
- 1992-95: UM School of Information Regent's Fellowship.
- 1991: SAA Sister M. Claude Lane, O.P., Memorial Award.

== Publications ==
Yakel has published extensively, especially in academic journals. Her oeuvre includes more than 130 writings that have been cited over 2,600 times. Articles cited more than 90 times include:

- "AI: Archival Intelligence and User Expertise" (with Deborah A. Torres) from The American Archivist 66/1 (2003); proposes a model of researcher expertise based on the assertion that there are "three distinct forms of knowledge required to work effectively with primary sources."
- "Digital Curation" from OCLC Systems & Services: International Digital Library Perspectives 23/4 (2007); a foundational article about the subject that provides a definition and an overview of its development.
- "Seeking Information, Seeking Connections, Seeking Meanings: Genealogists and Family Historians" from Information Research: An International Electronic Journal 10/1 (2004); focuses on the information seeking behavior of a particular user group who frequent libraries and archives—genealogists and family historians.
- "Interaction in Virtual Archives: The Polar Bear Expedition Digital Collections Next Generation Finding Aid" (with Magia Ghetu Krause) from The American Archivist 70/2 (2007); a "preliminary evaluation of an experimental finding aid" that incorporated social interaction (from the days when Web 2.0 was still a relatively new concept).
- "Archival Representation" from Archival Science 3/1 (2003); an analysis of "organizational and descriptive schemas, tools, and systems as a means of uncovering representational practices."

One of her earliest publications of note is Starting an Archives, a 1994 manual published by SAA and Scarecrow Press that provides the rationale for the establishment of an archival program and discusses the work involved in doing so.

In 2016, she and Doris Malkmus co-authored a module titled "Contextualizing Archival Literacy" for Teaching with Primary Sources, a volume of SAA's Trends in Archives Practice series, which aims to "fill significant gaps in archival literature." This module has been praised for doing "an excellent job of describing the current state of teaching with primary sources."
