= JLIS.it =

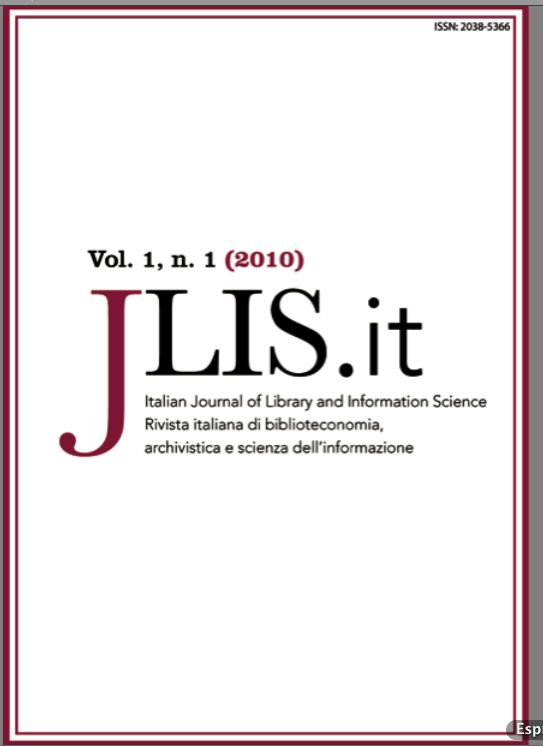
- Discipline: Library, archival, and information science
- Language: English, Italian
- Edited by: Mauro Guerrini

Publication details
- History: 2010-present
- Publisher: eum edizioni niversità di macerata (Italy)
- Frequency: Triannual
- Open access: Yes
- License: CC-by

Standard abbreviations
- ISO 4: JLIS.it

Indexing
- ISSN: 2038-1026
- OCLC no.: 661095725

Links
- Journal homepage; Online current issue; Online archive

JLIS.it: Italian Journal of Library, Archives and Information Science is a triannual peer-reviewed academic journal covering research in library, archival, and information science. It was established in 2010 and is published by the eum edizioni università di macerata. The editor-in-chief is Mauro Guerrini (University of Florence).

== Abstracting and indexing ==
The journal is abstracted and indexed in:

- Directory of Open Access Journals
- Emerging Sources Citation Index
- Library and Information Science Abstracts
- Library, Information Science & Technology Abstracts
- Servizio bibliotecario nazionale
- Scopus
