= New Century Library =

Chinese journal

- Type: Monthly journal
- Founded: 1980
- Headquarters: Nanjing
- ISSN: 1672-514X
- OCLC number: 54437744
- Website: newcentury.jslib.org.cn

New Century Library (simplified Chinese: 新世纪图书馆; traditional Chinese: 新世紀圖書館) is a Nanjing-based theoretical journal of library science and information science for the whole China, published monthly and located at No. 189, Zhongshan East Road, Nanjing.

The editor-in-chief of the New Century Library is Xu Xiaoyue. Its ISSN number is ISSN 1672-514X, and OCLC number is OCLC 54437744.

== History ==
Founded in 1980, New Century Library is supervised by the Department of Culture and Tourism of Jiangsu Province, and was organized by the Jiangsu Society for Library Science and Nanjing Library.
