= Portal – Libraries and the Academy =

Academic journal

portal: Libraries and the Academy
- Discipline: Library science
- Language: English
- Edited by: Ellysa Stern Cahoy

Publication details
- History: 2001-present
- Publisher: Johns Hopkins University Press (United States)
- Frequency: Quarterly
- Impact factor: 1.290 (2016)

Standard abbreviations
- ISO 4: Portal

Indexing
- ISSN: 1531-2542 (print); 1530-7131 (web)
- OCLC no.: 44453803

Links
- Journal homepage; Online access

portal: Libraries and the Academy is an academic journal established in 2001. It focuses on the role of libraries within the academy, addressing topics related to information technology, library administration, and the place of the library in an institution's educational and research mission. It is particularly given to exploration of the effects of technology on scholarship. The journal was awarded runner-up for best new journal by the Council of Editors of Learned Journals. Articles have also been awarded the American Library Association Jesse H. Shera Award for Excellence in Published Research. The journal is published quarterly by the Johns Hopkins University Press.

== Abstracting & Indexing ==
The journal is abstracted and indexed in Scopus, Social Science Citation Index, Library and Information Science Abstracts, and MLA - Modern Language Association Database.

According to the Journal Citation Reports, the journal has a 2016 impact factor of 1.290, ranking it 40th out of 85 journals in the category "Information Science & Library Science."
