= Faslname-ye Ketab =

Faslname-ye Ketab فصلنامه کتاب
- Discipline: library science
- Language: Persian
- Edited by: Fariborz Khosravi

Publication details
- Publisher: National Library of Iran (Iran)
- Frequency: quarterly

Standard abbreviations
- ISO 4: Faslname-ye Ketab

Indexing
- ISSN: 1022-6451

Links
- Journal homepage

Faslname-ye Ketab (Persian: فصلنامه کتاب) is the quarterly journal of the National Library and Archives of the Islamic Republic of Iran.

As of 2003 the editors requested that submissions be sent in Zarnegar or Microsoft Word format in order to "accelerate the process of publication".
