= Martin Schrettinger =

German priest and librarian (1772 - 1851)

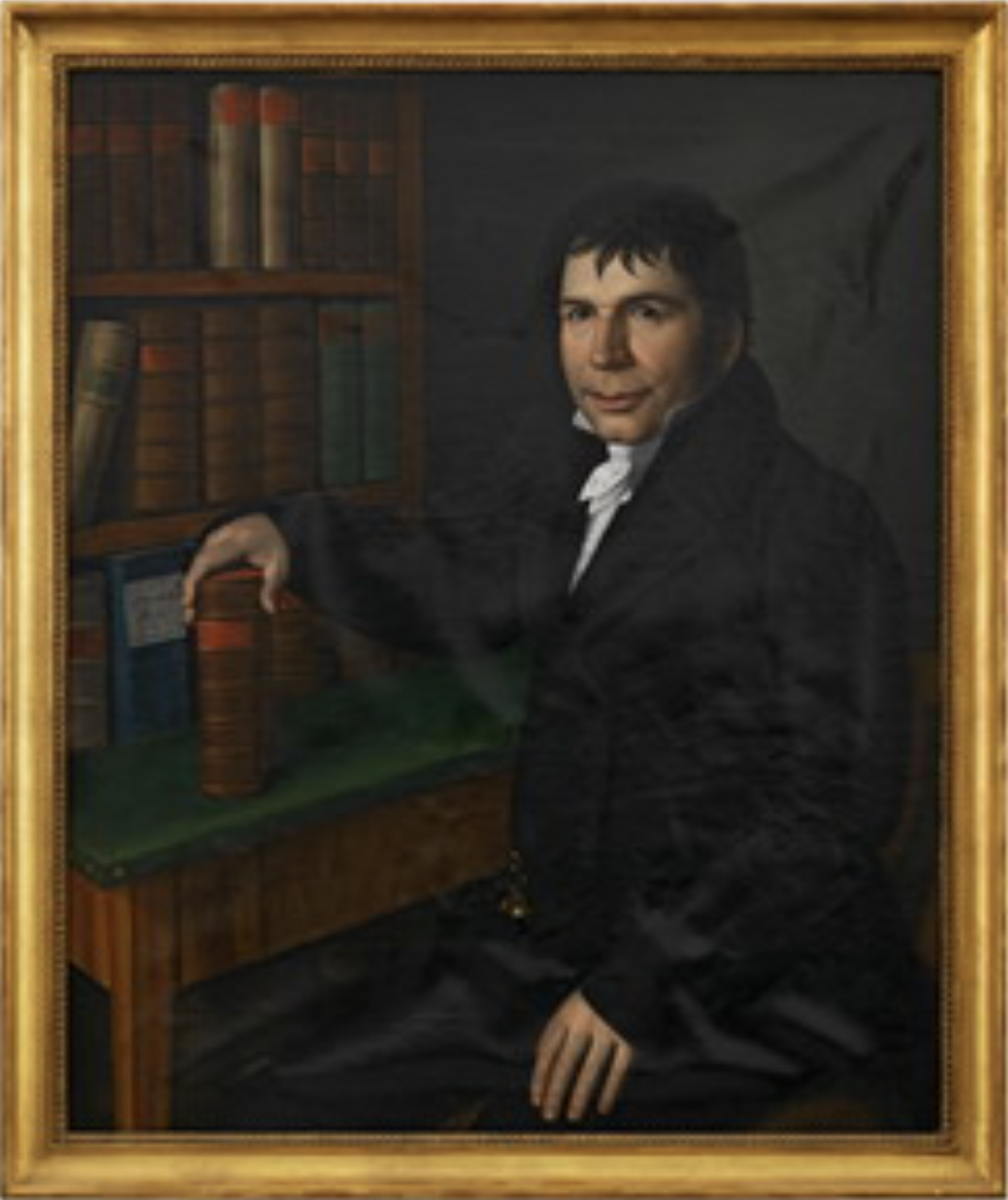
Martin Schrettinger

Martin Wilibald Schrettinger (17 June 1772 in Neumarkt in der Oberpfalz – 12 April 1851 in Munich) was a German priest and librarian.

== Life and career ==
In 1793 he joined the Benedictine monastery in Weißenohe, where he was ordained in 1795. In 1800 he became the monastery's librarian. In 1802 shortly before the closing of the monastery he went to Munich where he worked for the Royal Library (now the Bavarian State Library). He assumed the titles of curator (Kustos) in 1806 and in 1823 Under-librarian. In 1839, while still retaining his position as librarian, he was installed as a Canon at Munich's St. Kajetan.

Schrettinger is regarded as the founder of modern library science and was the first person to use the term. He created a catalog of all the library's holdings divided into subjects and sub-subjects. He cross-referenced these through an alphabetic catalog of authors and a catalog of locations within a library where books were shelved. In 1819 he began a classified catalog (Realkatalog), which itself is sometimes consulted by modern librarians and remains unfinished.

== Writings ==
- Versuch eines vollständigen Lehrbuches der Bibliothek-Wissenschaft oder Anleitung zur vollkommenen Geschäftsführung eines Bibliothekärs. Volume 1 (Sections 1-3): 1808-1810; Volume 2 (Section 4): 1829.
- Handbuch der Bibliothek-Wissenschaft. Vienna 1834. Reproduced by Weidmann, Hildesheim 2003. ISBN 3-615-00277-6
- The Bavarian State Library contains Schrettinger's journals from 1793–1850 and a handwritten autobiography.
- Philip Dormer Stanhope of Chesterfield: Die Kunst unter Menschen glücklich zu leben

== Bibliography ==
- Wilhelm Bäumker: Schrettinger, Martin. In: Allgemeine Deutsche Biographie, vol. 32. Duncker & Humblot, Leipzig 1891, p. 491 (online).
- Uwe Jochum: Bibliotheken und Bibliothekare 1800-1900. Königshausen und Neumann, Würzburg 1991. ISBN 3-88479-599-6
- Annemarie Kaindl: Martin Schrettinger zu Bau und Organisation der königlichen Hof- und Centralbibliothek. In: Bibliotheksforum Bayern, Jg. 14, 2020, Heft 1, p. 25–29 (online).
- Stephan Kellner: Schrettinger, Martin. In: Neue Deutsche Biographie, vol. 23. Duncker & Humblot, Berlin 2007, p. 545 sq. (online).
- Manfred Knedlik (2011). "Schrettinger, Martin". In Bautz, Traugott (ed.). Biographisch-Bibliographisches Kirchenlexikon (BBKL) (in German). Vol. 32. Nordhausen: Bautz. ISBN 978-3-88309-615-5.
- Manfred Knedlik: Martin Schrettinger, In: Literaturportal Bayern. (online)
- Manfred Knedlik: Wegbereiter eines modernen Bibliotheksmanagements. Martin Schrettinger (1772–1851). In: Bibliotheksmagazin, 2022, Heft 2, S. 9–13 (online).
- Alois Schmid: Martin Schrettinger aus Neumarkt in der Oberpfalz. In: Jahresbericht des Historischen Vereins für Neumarkt i.d. Opf. und Umgebung 22, 1999, p. 139–162.
- Sandro Uhlmann: Martin Schrettinger. Wegbereiter der modernen Bibliothekswissenschaft. In: Martin Schrettinger: Handbuch der Bibliothek-Wissenschaft. Neudruck der Ausgabe Wien 1834. Mit einem Nachwort und einer Bibliographie herausgegeben von Holger Nitzschner, Stefan Seeger und Sandro Uhlmann. Weidmann, Hildesheim 2003, ISBN 3-615-00277-6, p. 3–37.
- Literature by and about Martin Schrettinger in the German National Library catalogue
- Mönch, Rebell, Bibliothekar. Eine Ausstellung zum 250. Geburtstag von Martin Schrettinger. Virtual exhibition at Bavarian State Library (in German)
- Stadtbibliothek Neumarkt im Martin-Schrettinger-Haus
- Schrettinger Catalogue
- bavarikon
- Deutsche Biographie
- Deutsche Digitale Bibliothek
- Europeana
