= Cataloging & Classification Quarterly =

- Discipline: Library Science
- Language: English
- Edited by: Sandra K. Roe

Publication details
- History: 1980–present
- Publisher: Taylor and Francis (United States)
- Frequency: 8/year

Standard abbreviations
- ISO 4: Cat. Classif. Q.

Indexing
- CODEN: CCQUDB
- ISSN: 0163-9374
- LCCN: 81642892
- OCLC no.: 4538259

Links
- Journal homepage

Cataloging & Classification Quarterly is a peer-reviewed, scholarly journal that publishes articles about library cataloging, classification, metadata, indexing, information retrieval, information management, and other topics related to library cataloging. Despite its name, the journal is published eight times a year, but occasionally some issues are combined. Thematic issues are interspersed with general issues.

== History ==
Cataloging & Classification Quarterly (CCQ) began publishing in 1980. Previous editors have included C. Donald Cook (founding editor; volumes 1–2, 1980–1982), George E. Gibbs (volumes 3–5, 1983–1985), and Ruth C. Carter (volumes 6-41, 1985–2006). The editor-in-chief since volume 42 has been Sandra K. Roe. The journal was published by Haworth Press until 2007 when the company was acquired by Taylor and Francis, the current publisher.
