= Research Evaluation (journal) =

- Discipline: Information science
- Language: English
- Edited by: Nicolas Robinson-Garcia, Julia Melkers, Emanuela Reale

Publication details
- History: 1991-present
- Publisher: Oxford University Press
- Frequency: Quarterly
- Open access: Hybrid
- Impact factor: 2.706 (2020)

Standard abbreviations
- ISO 4: Res. Eval.

Indexing
- ISSN: 0958-2029 (print); 1471-5449 (web)
- LCCN: sn91027074
- OCLC no.: 909428865

Links
- Journal homepage; Online archive

Research Evaluation is a quarterly peer-reviewed academic journal covering the "evaluation of activities concerned with scientific research, technological development and innovation". It was established in 1991 and is published by Oxford University Press. The editors-in-chief are Nicolas Robinson-Garcia (University of Granada), Julia Melkers (Georgia Institute of Technology), Emanuela Reale (Consiglio Nazionale delle Ricerche).

== Abstracting and indexing ==
The journal is abstracted and indexed in:

- Current Contents/Social and Behavioral Sciences
- EBSCO databases
- Education Resources Information Center
- International Bibliography of Periodical Literature
- Scopus
- Social Sciences Citation Index

According to the Journal Citation Reports, the journal has a 2020 impact factor of 2.706.
