= IFLA Journal =

- Front cover of IFLA Journal
- Discipline: Information science
- Language: English
- Edited by: Steve Witt

Publication details
- History: 1975–present
- Publisher: SAGE Publications on behalf of the International Federation of Library Associations and Institutions
- Frequency: Quarterly
- Impact factor: 1.8 (2025)

Standard abbreviations
- ISO 4: IFLA J.

Indexing
- ISSN: 0340-0352 (print); 1745-2651 (web)
- LCCN: 75640191
- OCLC no.: 1286525

Links
- Journal homepage; Online access; Online archive

IFLA Journal is a quarterly peer-reviewed academic journal that covers the fields of librarianship and information science. It publishes original research, case studies, and essays on library and information services and the social, political and economic issues that impact access to information through libraries. The editor-in-chief is Steve Witt (University of Illinois at Urbana–Champaign). It was established in 1975 and is published by SAGE Publications on behalf of the International Federation of Library Associations and Institutions (IFLA).

== Editors ==
- W.R.H. Koops (1981-1989)
- Carol Henry (1990-2000)
- Stephen Parker (2001-2014)
- Steve Witt (2015-present)

== Abstracting and indexing ==
The journal is abstracted and indexed in:

- Abi/inform
- Academic Search Premier
- Business Source Corporate
- Compendex
- Current Awareness Abstracts
- Information Science and Technology Abstracts
- IBZ International Bibliography of Periodical Literature
- Inspec
- Library Information Science Abstracts
- Library Literature and Information Science
- Scopus
- Sociological Abstracts
- SciVal
