= The Journal of Academic Librarianship =

- Discipline: Academic librarianship
- Language: English
- Edited by: Marek Deja

Publication details
- History: 1975-present
- Publisher: Elsevier
- Frequency: Bimonthly
- Impact factor: 2.5 (2023)

Standard abbreviations
- ISO 4: J. Acad. Librariansh.

Indexing
- ISSN: 0099-1333
- LCCN: 75-647252
- OCLC no.: 2243594

Links
- Journal homepage; Online access

The Journal of Academic Librarianship is a peer-reviewed academic journal that covers all topics dealing with academic libraries. The journal publishes book reviews, analytical articles, and bibliographic essays. It was established in 1975 and is published by Elsevier.

== History ==
The Journal of Academic Librarianship was first published in March 1975 and has been a bimonthly publication ever since. It was initially edited by Richard M. Dougherty and William H. Webb. The current editor-in-chief is Marek Deja (Jagiellonian University).

== Abstracting and indexing ==
The journal is abstracted and indexed in:

- Current Contents
- Current Index to Journals in Education
- Education Index
- Information Science Abstracts
- Library and Information Science Abstracts
- Library Literature and Information Science
- Library, Information Science & Technology Abstracts
- Scopus
- Social Sciences Citation Index
- Sociological Abstracts

According to the Journal Citation Reports, the journal has a 2020 impact factor of 1.533.
