= Steve Sawyer (professor) =

American information scientist (born 1960)

- Born: February 13, 1960 (age 66); Arlington, Virginia
- Education: Boston University; US Merchant Marine Academy; University of Rhode Island
- Spouse: Sandra Bargainnier
- Awards: ASIS&T Award of Merit (2021)
- Scientific career
- Fields: Information systems Human–computer interaction Informatics; Residential real estate Gig-economy
- Workplaces: Syracuse University; Penn State
- Thesis: High-performing teams and support technology in software development (1995)
- Doctoral advisor: Patricia P.J. Guinan
- Website: sawyer.syr.edu

Steven Burton Sawyer (born February 13, 1960) is a professor in the School of Information Studies at Syracuse University. He is known for his research on social and organizational informatics, how people work together and how they use technology, and the relationships among changing forms of work & organization. Sawyer has worked on improving the social components of teamwork, as well as the distinctions between packaged and custom software development. His research is done through field-based studies of software developers, scientific collaborators, scientific data repositories, real estate agents, police officers, organizational technologists, and similar information-intensive work settings.

== Education ==
Sawyer earned his BS in Marine Transportation at the United States Merchant Marine Academy (1982) and MS in Ocean Engineering at University of Rhode Island (1986). He earned another MS degree in Management Information Systems from Boston University (1989), where he eventually got his DBA. His 1995 doctoral thesis was titled "High-performing teams and support technology in software development".

== Career ==
Sawyer began his career as assistant professor at Syracuse University in 1994. From January 1997 to August 1999, he was a research fellow at the Center for Information Technology Policy at Princeton University. In 1999, he was recruited to Pennsylvania State University as an associate professor of computer science. There he was a founding member of School (now College) of Information Sciences and Technology. At Penn State, Sawyer was named the first IST Faculty Member of the Year in 2001 and won the inaugural George McMurtry Award for Teaching in 2002.

Sawyer returned to Syracuse as an associate professor in August 2008 and was promoted to full professor in 2011. He is a core faculty member in the Renée Crown University Honors Program.

Sawyer has published 47 articles, 37 refereed conference papers, three books, 28 book chapters, more than 70 invited talks.

Sawyer serves as an associate editor for Digital Threats: Research and Practice and Transactions on Computational Social Systems journals.

Sawyer serves as the editor-in-chief of the Journal of the Association for Information Science and Technology (JASIST). He is the senior editor for Journal of Information Technology and associate editor for the Information Society. He has also served on the editorial boards of Journal of the Association for Information Systems and New Technology, Work, and Employment.

== Awards ==
In 2021, Sawyer received the Association for Information Science and Technology (ASIS&T) Award of Merit, the highest honor presented by the organization, for "particularly noteworthy and sustained contributions to the information science field".

== Personal life ==
Sawyer is rower and has coached summer camp program at the Riverside boat club in Boston. He coached the United States Rowing team (lightweight men's sweep team) at the 1991 Pan American Games in Havana, Cuba.
