= Serials Review =

- Discipline: Academic publishing
- Language: English
- Edited by: Sharon Dyas-Correia

Publication details
- History: 1975–present
- Publisher: Routledge
- Frequency: Quarterly
- Open access: Hybrid
- Impact factor: 0.351 (2021)

Standard abbreviations
- ISO 4: Ser. Rev.

Indexing
- ISSN: 0098-7913 (print); 1879-095X (web)
- LCCN: 77646575
- OCLC no.: 645359866

Links
- Journal homepage; Online access; Online archive

Serials Review is a quarterly peer-reviewed academic journal covering all aspects of the management and publishing of serials. The editor-in-chief is Sharon Dyas-Correia (University of Oxford).

== History ==
The journal was established in 1975 and published by Pergamon Press until 2010 when it moved to Elsevier. Since 2016 the journal has been published by Routledge.

== Abstracting and indexing ==
The journal is abstracted and indexed in:

- Current Contents/Social and Behavioral Sciences
- EBSCO databases
- Modern Language Association Database
- ProQuest databases
- Scopus
- Social Sciences Citation Index

According to the Journal Citation Reports, the journal has a 2021 impact factor of 0.351.
