= Journal of Religious & Theological Information =

Journal of Religious and Theological Information
- Discipline: Religious studies
- Language: English

Publication details
- History: 1992-present
- Publisher: Routledge
- Frequency: Quarterly

Standard abbreviations
- ISO 4: J. Relig. Theol. Inf.

Indexing
- ISSN: 1047-7845 (print); 1528-6924 (web)
- OCLC no.: 20789044

The Journal of Religious & Theological Information is a peer-reviewed academic journal published by Routledge that covers research in the field of library and information studies as relating to religious studies and related fields, including philosophy, ethnic studies, anthropology, sociology, and history.
