= Information Research =

- Discipline: Information science
- Language: English

Publication details
- History: 1995–present
- Publisher: University of Borås
- Frequency: Trianual
- Open access: Yes
- License: CC BY 4.0
- Impact factor: 0.9 (2024)

Standard abbreviations
- ISO 4: Inf. Res.

Indexing
- ISSN: 1368-1613
- OCLC no.: 909883219

Links
- Journal homepage

Information Research: An International Electronic Journal is a quarterly peer-reviewed open-access academic journal covering the fields of information science, information management, and information systems. It was established in 1995 as an electronic journal by Thomas D. Wilson (University of Sheffield and University of Borås). It was privately published by Professor Wilson until 2017, when ownership of the journal was transferred to the Swedish School of Library and Information Science, University of Borås. Professor Wilson continued to act as editor-in-chief until 2024, when the position was assumed by Professor Crystal Fulton of University College Dublin. The journal is now hosted by the Royal Library of Sweden, on its Publicera site. The journal is produced entirely through voluntary work; there are no subscription or author charges. A 2012 reader survey revealed that 40% of readers are academic faculty members, 38% "information practitioners", and 22% students and post-graduate researchers.

== Abstracting and indexing ==
The journal is abstracted and indexed in:

- Current Contents/Social & Behavioral Sciences
- EBSCO databases
- Inspec
- Library, Information Science & Technology Abstracts
- Library and Information Science Abstracts
- Scopus
- Web of Science

According to the Journal Citation Reports, the journal has a 2024, five-year impact factor of 0.9.
