= Journal of Information Science =

- Discipline: Information science
- Language: English
- Edited by: Allen Foster and Pauline Rafferty

Publication details
- Former names: Bulletin of the Institute of Information Scientists (until 1967); Information Scientist (until 1979, ISSN 0020-0263)
- History: 1979–present
- Publisher: SAGE Publications on behalf of Chartered Institute of Library and Information Professionals
- Frequency: Bimonthly
- Impact factor: 3.282 (2021)

Standard abbreviations
- ISO 4: J. Inf. Sci.

Indexing
- CODEN: JISCDI
- ISSN: 0165-5515 (print); 1741-6485 (web)
- LCCN: 79644637
- OCLC no.: 5094715

Links
- Journal homepage; Online access; Online archive

The Journal of Information Science is a bimonthly peer-reviewed academic journal covering research on information science, information management and some aspects of knowledge management.

== Publication history ==
The Journal of Information Science was established in 1979 by the Institute of Information Scientists (IIS). It was edited until 2004 (volume 29) by Alan Gilchrist. The current editors-in-chief are Allen Foster and Pauline Rafferty. The journal is published by SAGE Publications on behalf of the Chartered Institute of Library and Information Professionals (CILIP), which assumed the ownership of the title in 2002 following the merger of IIS with the Library Association to form CILIP.

The journal was preceded by the Bulletin of the Institute of Information Scientists (until 1967) and The Information Scientist (until 1979)

== Abstracting and indexing ==
In Google Scholar's category of Library & Information Science, the journal ranks #4 with a h5-index of 32 as of 2021.

In addition, the Journal of Information Science is abstracted and indexed in Scopus and the Social Sciences Citation Index. According to the Journal Citation Reports, its 2021 impact factor is 3.282, ranking it 30 out of 86 journals in the category "Information Science & Library Science".
