= Journal of Documentation =

- Discipline: Information science, library science
- Language: English
- Edited by: David Bawden

Publication details
- History: 1945–present
- Publisher: Emerald Group Publishing
- Frequency: Bimonthly
- Impact factor: 0.853 (2016)

Standard abbreviations
- ISO 4: J. Doc.

Indexing
- CODEN: JDOCAS
- ISSN: 0022-0418
- LCCN: 47040404
- OCLC no.: 01754538

Links
- Journal homepage

The Journal of Documentation is a double-blind peer-reviewed academic journal covering theories, concepts, models, frameworks, and philosophies in information science. The journal publishes scholarly articles, research reports, and critical reviews. The first editor was Theodore Besterman.

The scope of the Journal of Documentation is broadly information sciences, encompassing all of the academic and professional disciplines which deal with recorded information. These include, but are not limited to, information science, library science, and related disciplines, knowledge management, knowledge organization, information seeking, information retrieval, human information behaviour, and digital literacy.

The main audience for the journal is educators, scholars, researchers, and policy-makers in information-related areas. It published quarterly between 1945 and 1996, expanding to five issues per year between 1997 and 1999. Since 2000, it is published bimonthly. It is currently edited by David Bawden (City University London.) In celebration of the journal's 60th anniversary, a series of review articles were published between 2004 and 2006, which commented on the significance of eleven articles originally published in the Journal in the previous six decades.

The journal is published by Emerald Group Publishing. It is available for subscription singularly and also as part of an online subscription to the Emerald Library and Information Studies Subject Collection.
