= Conceptions of Library and Information Science =

Conceptions of Library and Information Science (CoLIS) is a series of conferences about historical, empirical and theoretical perspectives in Library and Information Science.

== CoLIS conferences ==
- CoLIS 1 1991 in Tampere, Finland
- CoLIS 2 1996 in Copenhagen, Denmark
- CoLIS 3 1999 in Dubrovnik, Croatia
- CoLIS 4 2002 in Seattle, US
- CoLIS 5 2005 in Glasgow, Scotland
- CoLIS 6 2007 in Borås, Sweden
- CoLIS 7 June 2010 in London, at City University London.
- CoLIS 8 August 19–22, 2013, in Copenhagen, Denmark, at The Royal School of Library and Information Science.
- CoLIS 9 June 27–29, 2016, in Uppsala, Sweden, at Uppsala University.
- CoLIS 10 June 16–19, 2019, in Ljubljana, Slovenia, Faculty of Arts
- CoLIS 11 May 29–June 1, 2022, in Oslo, Norway, Oslo Metropolitan University.
- CoLIS 12 June 2–5, 2025, in Glasgow, Scotland, University of Strathclyde..
