= Library Trends =

- Discipline: Library science, Information science
- Language: English
- Edited by: Melissa A. Wong, University of Illinois Urbana–Champaign

Publication details
- History: 1952–present
- Publisher: Johns Hopkins University Press for the University of Illinois School of Information Sciences (United States)
- Frequency: Quarterly
- Impact factor: 0.259 (2016)

Standard abbreviations
- ISO 4: Libr. Trends

Indexing
- ISSN: 0024-2594 (print); 1559-0682 (web)
- OCLC no.: 2313195

Links
- Journal homepage; Online access at Project MUSE; Online access at IDEALS

Library Trends is a quarterly peer-reviewed academic journal founded in 1952 and published quarterly by the Johns Hopkins University Press. It covers international developments and future directions in the fields of library and information science. It includes analysis of research and writing, critical opinion, and reviews. Each issue is devoted to a single topic of interest.

Library Trends is available electronically via EBSCO, Academic OneFile (Gale), WilsonWeb (Wilson Library Literature & Information Science Full Text), IDEALS, and Project MUSE.
