= Information Processing and Management =

Bimonthly peer-reviewed academic journal

- Discipline: Management
- Language: English
- Edited by: Jim Jansen

Publication details
- Former name(s): Information Storage and Retrieval
- History: 1963–present
- Publisher: Elsevier
- Frequency: Bimonthly
- Open access: Hybrid
- Impact factor: 7.4 (2023)

Standard abbreviations
- ISO 4: Inf. Process. Manag.

Indexing
- ISSN: 0306-4573
- LCCN: 75646801
- OCLC no.: 780565488

Links
- Journal homepage; Online archive

Information Processing and Management is a bimonthly peer-reviewed academic journal published by Elsevier covering the field of information and computational sciences applied to management. The journal was established in 1963 as Information Storage and Retrieval, obtaining its current name in 1975.

== Editors-in-chief ==
The following persons are or have been editors-in-chief:

- 2016–present: Jim Jansen (Qatar Computing Research Institute)
- 2008–2015: Fabio Crestani, (University of Lugano)
- 1985–2008: Tefko Saracevic (Rutgers University)
- 1969–1985: Bernard Fry (Indiana University)
- 1963–1969: Jason Farradane (City, University of London)

== Abstracting and indexing ==
The journal is abstracted and indexed in:

- EBSCO databases
- FRANCIS
- Inspec
- Modern Language Association Database
- ProQuest databases
- Science Citation Index Expanded
- Scopus
- Social Sciences Citation Index
- Zentralblatt MATH

According to the Journal Citation Reports, the journal has a 2023 impact factor of 7.4.
