= Journal of the Association for Information Science and Technology =

Academic journal of information science

- Discipline: Information science
- Language: English
- Edited by: Steve Sawyer

Publication details
- Former names: American Documentation, Journal of the American Society for Information Science, Journal of the American Society for Information Science and Technology
- History: 1950–present
- Publisher: Wiley-Blackwell
- Frequency: Monthly
- Impact factor: 4.3 (2024)

Standard abbreviations
- ISO 4: J. Assoc. Inf. Sci. Technol.

Indexing
- CODEN: JAISCR
- ISSN: 2330-1635 (print); 2330-1643 (web)
- LCCN: 2013203451
- OCLC no.: 949940497
- Journal of the American Society for Information Science
- CODEN: AISJB6
- ISSN: 0002-8231 (print); 1097-4571 (web)
- LCCN: 75-640174
- OCLC no.: 1097324898
- Journal of the American Society for Information Science and Technology
- CODEN: JASIEF
- ISSN: 1532-2882 (print); 1532-2890 (web)
- LCCN: 00-212816
- OCLC no.: 709977329

Links
- Journal homepage; Online access; Online archives

The Journal of the Association for Information Science and Technology is a monthly peer-reviewed academic journal covering all aspects of information science published by Wiley-Blackwell on behalf of the Association for Information Science and Technology. The journal publishes original research and rapid communications, as well as book reviews and announcements of the association. Occasional special issues appear with contents focused on a single topic area.

== History ==
Established in 1950 as the quarterly journal American Documentation, the new publication was produced by the American Documentation Institute (ADI), which had formed in 1937 around a group of researchers and practitioners interested in the emerging technology of microfilm as a medium for the preservation and dissemination of documents and knowledge. Many of the same people and institutions were involved in a pre-war American Library Association journal called The Journal of Documentary Reproduction, which ran from 1938 to 1943, before being discontinued due to the imperatives of the war.

American Documentation was an explicit continuation of and extension upon The Journal of Documentary Reproduction, with a broader brief to cover documentation as a whole, then defined as "...the creation, transmission, collection, classification and use of 'documents'; documents may be broadly defined as recorded knowledge in any format."

In the postwar years, rapid technological and social changes ushered in an "information explosion" which created many new problems and opportunities of special interest to documentation specialists, and in time documentation found itself at the center of the emerging field of information science. The ADI's membership and scope increased rapidly, and in 1968 the members voted to change the organization's name to "American Society for Information Science", to reflect the changes in their membership and focus. As their official journal, American Documentation followed suit, and beginning with the first issue of 1970 it changed its name to The Journal of the American Society for Information Science and began publishing bimonthly.

In 1991, the publication frequency increased to 10 issues yearly and by 1996, the journal was publishing monthly. In 2000, ASIS again voted to change its name, this time to The "American Society for Information Science and Technology", in order to recognize the further changes in membership and interests brought on by the rise of the internet and the mainstreaming of networked computing and information technology. The journal's name was subsequently also changed in January 2001 to Journal of the American Society for Information Science and Technology. It obtained its current name in January 2014.

== Abstracting and indexing ==
The journal is abstracted and indexed in:

- Chemical Abstracts Service
- CINAHL
- Current Contents/Social and Behavioral Sciences
- EBSCO databases
- Ei Compendex
- FRANCIS
- Inspec
- Library and Information Science Abstracts
- Library, Information Science & Technology Abstracts
- Modern Language Association Database
- ProQuest databases
- Science Citation Index Expanded
- Scopus
- Social Sciences Citation Index

According to the Journal Citation Reports, the journal has a 2024 impact factor of 4.3.
