= Library Literature and Information Science =

- Producer: EBSCO Information Services (United States)

Access
- Cost: Subscription

Coverage
- Disciplines: Library and information science
- Record depth: Full-text, indexing and abstracts

Links
- Website: www.ebsco.com/products/research-databases/library-literature-information-science-full-text

Library Literature and Information Science is a bibliographic database that indexes over 410 library and information science periodicals published internationally. It also covers books, chapters within books, library school theses, and pamphlets. In 2011, the H. W. Wilson Company, the firm that created the index, sold it to EBSCO Publishing along with other H.W. Wilson indexes and databases.

== Coverage ==
The database includes bibliographical indexing from 1984 to the present. It has full-text coverage from 1997, but the start date varies for each publication.

== See also ==
- Dissertations Abstracts
- ERIC
- INSPEC
- Library and Information Science Abstracts (LISA)
- Library, Information Science & Technology Abstracts
- Social Sciences Citation Index
- Web of Science
