= Education Resources Information Center =

US Department of Education online repository

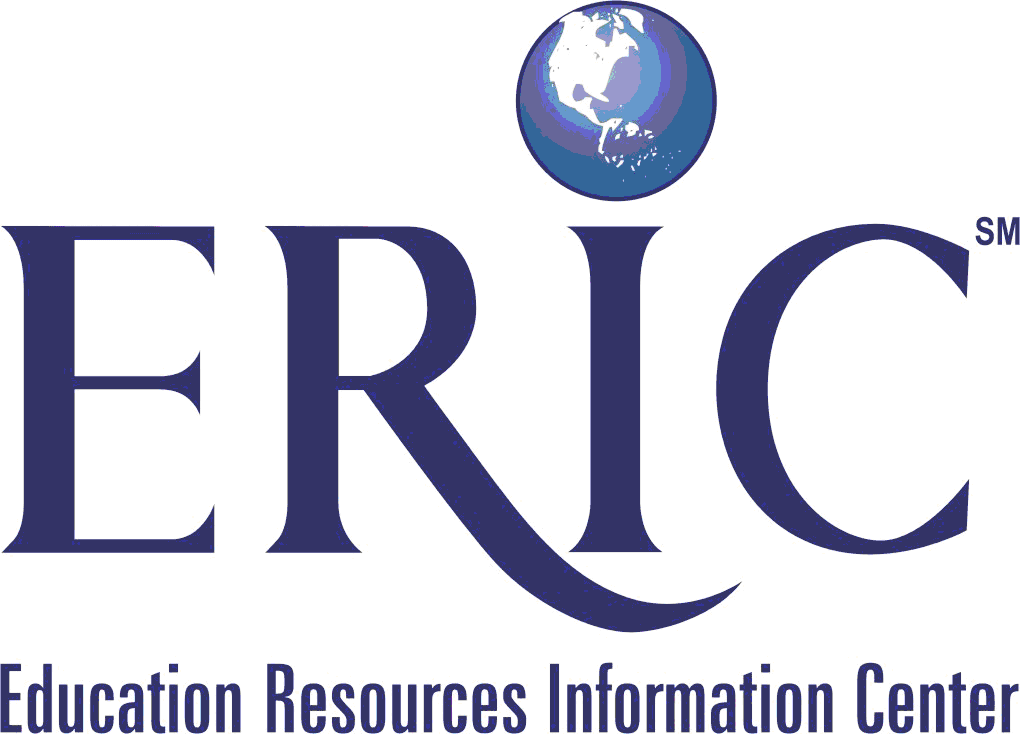
- old ERIC logo
- Founded: May 15, 1964
- Area served: Global
- Parent: Institute of Education Sciences within the United States Department of Education
- Website: eric.ed.gov

The Education Resources Information Center (ERIC) is an online digital library of education research and information. ERIC is sponsored by the Institute of Education Sciences of the United States Department of Education.

== Description ==
The mission of ERIC is to provide a comprehensive, easy-to-use, searchable, Internet-based bibliographic and full-text database of education research and information for educators, researchers, and the general public. Education research and information are essential to improving teaching, learning, and educational decision-making.

ERIC provides access to 1.5 million bibliographic records (citations, abstracts, and other pertinent data) of journal articles and other education-related materials, with hundreds of new records added every week. A key component of ERIC is its collection of grey literature in education, which is largely available in full text in Adobe PDF format. Approximately one quarter of the complete ERIC Collection is available in full text. Materials with no full text available (primarily journal articles) can often be accessed using links to publisher websites and/or library holdings. ERIC usually includes education related articles in its database. Sample articles include "The Economic, Social and Administrative Pharmacy (ESAP) Discipline in US Schools and Colleges of Pharmacy", "Aesthetics in Young Children's Lives: From Music Technology Curriculum Perspective", and "Digital Game's Impacts on Students' Learning Effectiveness of Correct Medication".

The ERIC Collection, begun in 1966, contains records for a variety of publication types, including:

- journal articles
- books
- research syntheses
- conference papers
- technical reports
- dissertations
- policy papers, and
- other education-related materials

ERIC provides the public with a centralized Web site for searching the ERIC collection and submitting materials to be considered for inclusion in the collection. Users can also access the collection through commercial database vendors, statewide and institutional networks, and Internet search engines. To help users find the information they are seeking, ERIC produces a controlled vocabulary, the Thesaurus of ERIC Descriptors. This is a carefully selected list of education-related words and phrases used to tag materials by subject and make them easier to retrieve through a search.

Prior to January 2004, the ERIC network consisted of sixteen subject-specific clearinghouses, various adjunct and affiliate clearinghouses, and three support components. The program was consolidated into a single entity, with upgraded systems, and paper-based processes converted to electronic, thus streamlining operations and speeding delivery of content.

In March 2025, it was announced that the number of sources catalogued by ERIC was to be reduced by 45%.

== See also ==
- List of academic databases and search engines
