= Library and Information Science Abstracts =

US periodical

- Producer: ProQuest (United Kingdom)
- History: 1969-present

Access
- Cost: Subscription

Coverage
- Disciplines: library and information science
- Update frequency: Continuously

Links
- Website: about.proquest.com/en/products-services/lisa-set-c

The Library and Information Science Abstracts (LISA) is an international abstracting and indexing tool designed for library professionals and other information specialists. LISA covers the literature in Library and information science (LIS) since 1969 and currently abstracts 440+ periodicals from 68+ countries and in 20+ languages.

LISA was originally published by the Library Association. Bowker-Saur began publishing LISA in 1991. Cambridge Information Group acquired Bowker in 2001 and LISA began being produced by subsidiary Cambridge Scientific Abstracts. CSA merged with ProQuest in 2007.

== Coverage ==
Meho & Spurgin (2005) found that in a list of 2,625 items published between 1982 and 2002 by 68 faculty members of 18 schools of library and information science, only 10 databases provided significant coverage of the LIS literature. Data showed that Library Literature and Information Science (LLIS) indexes the highest percentage of LIS faculty publications (31.2%), followed by INSPEC (30.6%), Social Sciences Citation Index (SSCI)(29.6%), and LISA (27.2%). LISA is thus the fourth most comprehensive in this study.

== Other important databases covering library and information science ==
- Dissertations Abstracts
- ERIC
- INSPEC
- Library, Information Science & Technology Abstracts (LISTA)
- Library Literature and Information Science
- Social Sciences Citation Index
- Web of Science
