= Library and information science =

Branch of academic disciplines

Library cataloging and classification
- Dewey Decimal: 020
- Library of Congress: Z664.2-Z718.85

Library and Information Science (LIS) are two academic disciplines that study all aspects of the creation, organization, documentation, management, communication, and use of recorded information. It underlies a variety of professional activities such as information management, librarianship, and archiving and records management, educating professionals for work in those areas, and carrying out research to improve practice.

Library science and information science are two original disciplines; however, they are within the same field of study. Library science is applied information science, as well as a subfield of information science. Due to the strong connection, sometimes the two terms are used synonymously.

== Definition ==
Library science (previously termed library studies and library economy) (Note: Dewey Decimal Classification (DDC) used the term "library economy" for class 19 in its first edition from 1876. In the second edition (and all subsequent editions) it was moved to class 20. The term "library economy" was used until (and including) the 14th edition (1942). From the 15th edition (1951) class 20 was termed library science, which was used until (and including) 17th edition (1965) when it was replaced by "library and information sciences" (LIS) from the 18th edition (1971) and forward.) is an interdisciplinary or multidisciplinary field that applies the practices, perspectives, and tools of management, information technology, education, and other areas to libraries; the collection, organization, preservation, and dissemination of information resources; and the political economy of information. Martin Schrettinger, a Bavarian librarian, coined the discipline within his work (1808–1828) Versuch eines vollständigen Lehrbuchs der Bibliothek-Wissenschaft oder Anleitung zur vollkommenen Geschäftsführung eines Bibliothekars. Rather than classifying information based on nature-oriented elements, as was previously done in his Bavarian library, Schrettinger organized books in alphabetical order. The first American school for library science was founded by Melvil Dewey at Columbia University in 1887.

Historically, library science has also included archival science. This includes: how information resources are organized to serve the needs of selected user groups; how people interact with classification systems and technology; how information is acquired, evaluated and applied by people in and outside libraries as well as cross-culturally; how people are trained and educated for careers in libraries; the ethics that guide library service and organization; the legal status of libraries and information resources; and the applied science of computer technology used in documentation and records management.

LIS should not be confused with information theory, the mathematical study of the concept of information. Library philosophy has been contrasted with library science as the study of the aims and justifications of librarianship as opposed to the development and refinement of techniques.

== Education and training ==
Academic courses in library science include collection management, information systems and technology, research methods, user studies, information literacy, cataloging and classification, preservation, reference, statistics and management. Library science is constantly evolving, incorporating new topics like database management, information architecture and information management, among others.

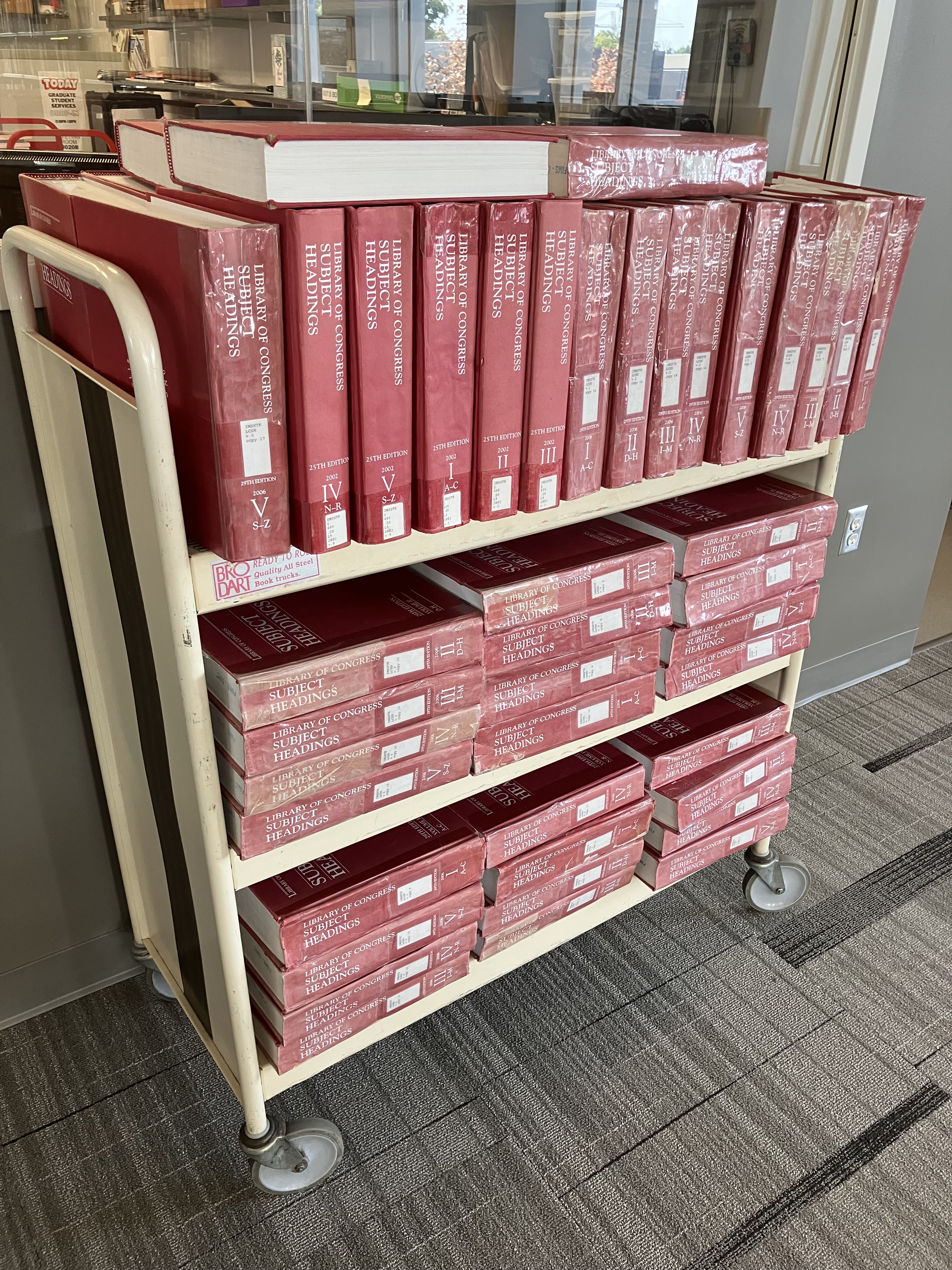
Library of Congress Subject Headings schedules used for educational purposes in Canada

With the mounting acceptance of Wikipedia as a valued and reliable reference source, many libraries, museums, and archives have introduced the role of Wikipedian in residence. As a result, some universities are including coursework relating to Wikipedia and Knowledge Management in their MLIS programs.

Becoming a library staff member does not always need a degree, and in some contexts the difference between being a library staff member and a librarian is the level of education. Most professional library jobs require a professional degree in library science or equivalent. In the United States and Canada the certification usually comes from a master's degree granted by an ALA-accredited institution. In Australia, a number of institutions offer degrees accepted by the ALIA (Australian Library and Information Association). Global standards of accreditation or certification in librarianship have yet to be developed.

=== United States and Canada ===
The Master of Library and Information Science (MLIS) is the master's degree that is required for most professional librarian positions in the United States and Canada. The MLIS was created after the older Master of Library Science (MLS) was reformed to reflect the information science and technology needs of the field. According to the American Library Association (ALA), "ALA-accredited degrees have [had] various names such as Master of Arts, Master of Librarianship, Master of Library and Information Studies, or Master of Science. The degree name is determined by the program. The [ALA] Committee for Accreditation evaluates programs based on their adherence to the Standards for Accreditation of Master's Programs in Library and Information Studies, not based on the name of the degree."

== Types of librarianship ==
=== Public ===
The study of librarianship for public libraries covers issues such as cataloging; collection development for a diverse community; information literacy; readers' advisory; community standards; public services-focused librarianship via community-centered programming; serving a diverse community of adults, children, and teens; intellectual freedom; censorship; and legal and budgeting issues. The public library as a commons or public sphere based on the work of Jürgen Habermas has become a central metaphor in the 21st century.

In the United States there are four different types of public libraries: association libraries, municipal public libraries, school district libraries, and special district public libraries. Each receives funding through different sources, each is established by a different set of voters, and not all are subject to municipal civil service governance.

=== School ===
The study of school librarianship covers library services for children in nursery, primary through secondary school. In some regions, the local government may have stricter standards for the education and certification of school librarians (who are sometimes considered a special case of teacher), than for other librarians, and the educational program will include those local criteria. School librarianship may also include issues of intellectual freedom, pedagogy, information literacy, and how to build a cooperative curriculum with the teaching staff.

=== Academic ===
The study of academic librarianship covers library services for colleges and universities. Issues of special importance to the field may include copyright; technology; digital libraries and digital repositories; academic freedom; open access to scholarly works; and specialized knowledge of subject areas important to the institution and the relevant reference works. Librarians often divide focus individually as liaisons on particular schools within a college or university. Academic librarians may be subject specific librarians.

Some academic librarians are considered faculty, and hold similar academic ranks to those of professors, while others are not. In either case, the minimal qualification is a Master of Arts in Library Studies or a Master of Arts in Library Science. Some academic libraries may only require a master's degree in a specific academic field or a related field, such as educational technology.

=== Archival ===
The study of archives includes the training of archivists, librarians specially trained to maintain and build archives of records intended for historical preservation. Special issues include physical preservation, conservation, and restoration of materials and mass deacidification; specialist catalogs; solo work; access; and appraisal. Many archivists are also trained historians specializing in the period covered by the archive. There have been attempts to revive the concept of documentation and to speak of Library, information and documentation studies (or science).

The archival mission includes three major goals: To identify papers and records with enduring value, preserve the identified papers, and make the papers available to others. While libraries receive items individually, archival items will usually become part of the archive's collection as a cohesive group. Major difference in collections is that library collections typically comprise published items (books, magazines, etc.), while archival collections are usually unpublished works (letters, diaries, etc.). Library collections are created by many individuals, as each author and illustrator create their own publication; in contrast, an archive usually collects the records of one person, family, institution, or organization, so the archival items will have fewer sources of authors.

Behavior in an archive differs from behavior in other libraries. In most libraries, items are openly available to the public. Archival items almost never circulate, and someone interested in viewing documents must request them of the archivist and may only be able view them in a closed reading room.

=== Special ===
Special libraries are libraries established to meet the highly specialized requirements of professional or business groups. A library is special depending on whether it covers a specialized collection, a special subject, or a particular group of users, or even the type of parent organization, such as medical libraries or law libraries.

The issues at these libraries are specific to their industries but may include solo work, corporate financing, specialized collection development, and extensive self-promotion to potential patrons. Special librarians have their own professional organization, the Special Libraries Association (SLA).

Some special libraries, such as the CIA Library, may contain classified works. It is a resource to employees of the Central Intelligence Agency, containing over 125,000 written materials, subscribes to around 1,700 periodicals, and had collections in three areas: Historical Intelligence, Circulating, and Reference. In February 1997, three librarians working at the institution spoke to Information Outlook, a publication of the SLA, revealing that the library had been created in 1947, the importance of the library in disseminating information to employees, even with a small staff, and how the library organizes its materials.

=== Preservation ===
Preservation librarians most often work in academic libraries. Their focus is on the management of preservation activities that seek to maintain access to content within books, manuscripts, archival materials, and other library resources. Examples of activities managed by preservation librarians include binding, conservation, digital and analog reformatting, digital preservation, and environmental monitoring.

== History ==
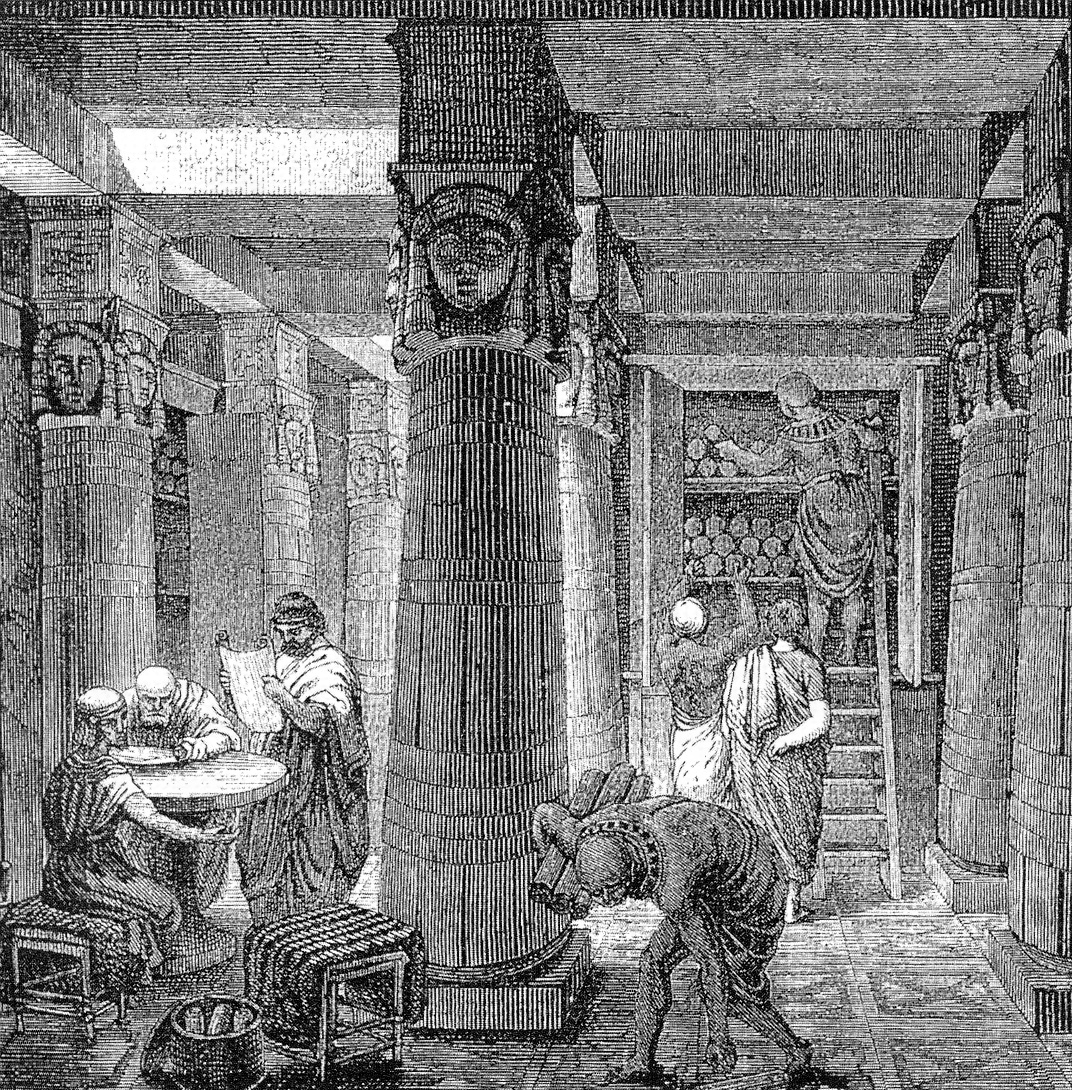
The Library of Alexandria, an early library

Libraries have existed for many centuries but library science is a more recent phenomenon, as early libraries were managed primarily by academics.

=== 17th and 18th century ===
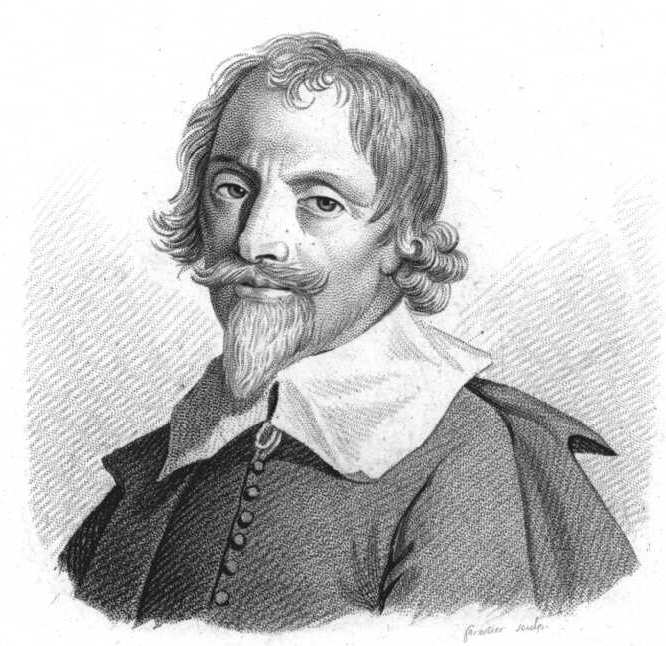
Portrait of Gabriel Naudé, author of Advis pour dresser une bibliothèque (1627), later translated into English in 1661

The earliest text on "library operations", Advice on Establishing a Library was published in 1627 by French librarian and scholar Gabriel Naudé. Naudé wrote on many subjects including politics, religion, history, and the supernatural. He put into practice all the ideas put forth in Advice when given the opportunity to build and maintain the library of Cardinal Jules Mazarin.

During the 'golden age of libraries' in the 17th century, publishers and sellers seeking to take advantage of the burgeoning book trade developed descriptive catalogs of their wares for distribution – a practice was adopted and further extrapolated by many libraries of the time to cover areas like philosophy, sciences, linguistics, and medicine

In 1726 Gottfried Wilhelm Leibniz wrote Idea of Arranging a Narrower Library.

=== 19th century ===
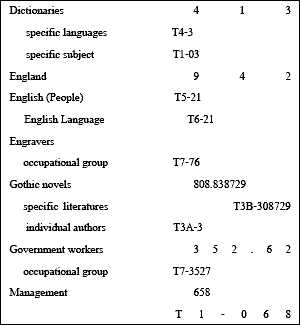
The Dewey Decimal Classification is used as a means of organising literature by topic.

Martin Schrettinger wrote the second textbook (the first in Germany) on the subject from 1808 to 1829.

Some of the main tools used by LIS to provide access to the resources originated in 19th century to make information accessible by recording, identifying, and providing bibliographic control of printed knowledge. The origin for some of these tools were even earlier.

Thomas Jefferson, whose library at Monticello consisted of thousands of books, devised a classification system inspired by the Baconian method, which grouped books more or less by subject rather than alphabetically, as it was previously done. The Jefferson collection provided the basis of what became the Library of Congress after the first collection was destroyed in the 1814 Burning of Washington.

The first American school of librarianship opened in New York under the leadership of Melvil Dewey, noted for his 1876 decimal classification, on January 5, 1887, as the Columbia College School of Library Economy. The term library economy was common in the U.S. until 1942, with the term, library science, predominant through much of the 20th century.

=== 20th century ===
In the English-speaking world the term "library science" seems to have been used for the first time in India in the 1916 book Punjab Library Primer, written by Asa Don Dickinson and published by the University of Punjab, Lahore, Pakistan. This university was the first in Asia to begin teaching "library science". The Punjab Library Primer was the first textbook on library science published in English anywhere in the world. The first textbook in the United States was the Manual of Library Economy by James Duff Brown, published in 1903.

Later, the term was used in the title of S. R. Ranganathan's The Five Laws of Library Science, published in 1931, which contains Ranganathan's titular theory. Ranganathan is also credited with the development of the first major analytical-synthetic classification system, the colon classification.

In the United States, Lee Pierce Butler published his 1933 book An Introduction to Library Science (University of Chicago Press), where he advocated for research using quantitative methods and ideas in the social sciences with the aim of using librarianship to address society's information needs. He was one of the first faculty at the University of Chicago Graduate Library School, which changed the structure and focus of education for librarianship in the twentieth century. This research agenda went against the more procedure-based approach of the "library economy", which was mostly confined to practical problems in the administration of libraries.

In 1923, Charles C. Williamson, who was appointed by the Carnegie Corporation, published an assessment of library science education entitled "The Williamson Report", which designated that universities should provide library science training. This report had a significant impact on library science training and education. Library research and practical work, in the area of information science, have remained largely distinct both in training and in research interests.

William Stetson Merrill's A Code for Classifiers, released in several editions from 1914 to 1939, is an example of a more pragmatic approach, where arguments stemming from in-depth knowledge about each field of study are employed to recommend a system of classification. While Ranganathan's approach was philosophical, it was also tied more to the day-to-day business of running a library. A reworking of Ranganathan's laws was published in 1995 which removes the constant references to books. Michael Gorman's Our Enduring Values: Librarianship in the 21st Century features the eight principles necessary by library professionals and incorporates knowledge and information in all their forms, allowing for digital information to be considered.

==== From library science to LIS ====
By the late 1960s, mainly due to the meteoric rise of human computing power and the new academic disciplines formed therefrom, academic institutions began to add the term "information science" to their names. The first school to do this was at the University of Pittsburgh in 1964. More schools followed during the 1970s and 1980s. By the 1990s almost all library schools in the US had added information science to their names. Although there are exceptions, similar developments have taken place in other parts of the world. In India, the Department of Library Science, University of Madras (southern state of Tamil Nadu, India) became the Department of Library and Information Science in 1976. In Denmark, for example, the "Royal School of Librarianship" changed its English name to The Royal School of Library and Information Science in 1997.

=== 21st century ===
The digital age has transformed how information is accessed and retrieved. "The library is now a part of a complex and dynamic educational, recreational, and informational infrastructure." Mobile devices and applications with wireless networking, high-speed computers and networks, and the computing cloud have deeply impacted and developed information science and information services. The evolution of the library sciences maintains its mission of access equity and community space, as well as the new means for information retrieval called information literacy skills. All catalogs, databases, and a growing number of books are available on the Internet. In addition, the expanding free access to open access journals and sources such as Wikipedia has fundamentally impacted how information is accessed.

Information literacy is the ability to "determine the extent of information needed, access the needed information effectively and efficiently, evaluate information and its sources critically, incorporate selected information into one's knowledge base, use information effectively to accomplish a specific purpose, and understand the economic, legal, and social issues surrounding the use of information, and access and use information ethically and legally." In recent years, the concept of data literacy has emerged within library and information science as a complement to information literacy to refer to the ability to find, interpret, evaluate, manage, and ethically use data to support research, learning, and informed decision-making.

In the early 2000s, dLIST, Digital Library for Information Sciences and Technology was established. It was the first open access archive for the multidisciplinary 'library and information sciences' building a global scholarly communication consortium and the LIS Commons in order to increase the visibility of research literature, bridge the divide between practice, teaching, and research communities, and improve visibility, uncitedness, and integrate scholarly work in the critical information infrastructures of archives, libraries, and museums.

Social justice, an important ethical value in librarianship and in the 21st century has become an important research area, if not subdiscipline of LIS.

== Journals ==
Some core journals in LIS are:

- Annual Review of Information Science and Technology (ARIST) (1966–2011)
- El Profesional de la Información (EPI) (1992–) (Formerly Information World en Español)
- IFLA Journal (1975–)
- Information Processing and Management
- Information Research: An International Electronic Journal (IR) (1995–)
- Italian Journal of Library, Archives and Information Science (JLIS.it) (2010–)
- Journal of Documentation (JDoc) (1945–)
- Journal of Information Science (JIS) (1979–)
- Journal of the Association for Information Science and Technology (formerly Journal of the American Society for Information Science and Technology) (JASIST) (1950–)
- Knowledge Organization
- Library Literature and Information Science Retrospective
- Library Trends (1952–)
- Scientometrics (journal) (1978–)
- The Library Quarterly (LQ) (1931–)
- Grandhalaya Sarvaswam (1915–)

Important bibliographical databases in LIS are, among others, Social Sciences Citation Index and Library and Information Science Abstracts

== Encyclopedias ==
Some core encyclopedias in LIS, updated with the latest editions:

- International Encyclopedia of Information and Library Science (2nd)
- Encyclopedia of Library and Information Sciences (4th)
- Encyclopedia of Libraries, Librarianship, and Information Science

== Conferences ==
This is a list of some of the major conferences in the field.

- Annual meetings of the American Library Association.
- Annual meeting of the American Society for Information Science and Technology
- Annual meeting of the Association for Library and Information Science Education
- Conceptions of Library and Information Science
- Congress of Southeast Asian Librarians (CONSAL)
- i-Schools' iConferences
- The International Federation of Library Associations and Institutions (IFLA): World Library and Information Congress
- African Library and Information Associations and Institutions (AfLIA) Conference

== Subfields ==
Information science grew out of documentation science and therefore has a tradition for considering scientific and scholarly communication, bibliographic databases, subject knowledge and terminology etc.

An advertisement for a full Professor in information science at the Royal School of Library and Information Science, spring 2011, provides one view of which sub-disciplines are well-established: "The research and teaching/supervision must be within some (and at least one) of these well-established information science areas

1. Knowledge organization
2. Library studies
3. Information architecture
4. Information behavior
5. Interactive information retrieval
6. Information systems
7. Scholarly communication
8. Digital literacy (cf information literacy)
9. Bibliometrics or scientometrics
10. Interaction design and user experience
11. Digital library

A curriculum study by Kajberg & Lørring in 2005 reported a "degree of overlap of the ten curricular themes with subject areas in the current curricula of responding LIS schools".

- Information seeking and Information retrieval 100%
- Library management and promotion 96%
- Knowledge management 86%
- Knowledge organization 82%
- Information literacy and learning 76%
- Library and society in a historical perspective (Library history) 66%
- The Information society: Barriers to the free access to information 64%
- Cultural heritage and digitisation of the cultural heritage (Digital preservation) 62%
- The library in the multi-cultural information society: International and intercultural communication 42%
- Mediation of culture in a special European context 26% "

There is often an overlap between these subfields of LIS and other fields of study. Most information retrieval research, for example, belongs to computer science. Knowledge management is considered a subfield of management or organizational studies.

=== Metadata ===
Pre-Internet classification systems and cataloging systems were mainly concerned with two objectives:

1. To provide rich bibliographic descriptions and relations between information objects, and
2. To facilitate sharing of this bibliographic information across library boundaries.

The development of the Internet and the information explosion that followed found many communities needing mechanisms for the description, authentication and management of their information. These communities developed taxonomies and controlled vocabularies to describe their knowledge, as well as unique information architectures to communicate these classifications and libraries found themselves as liaison or translator between these metadata systems. The concerns of cataloging in the Internet era have gone beyond simple bibliographic descriptions and the need for descriptive information about the ownership and copyright of a digital product – a publishing concern – and description for the different formats and accessibility features of a resource – a sociological concern – show the continued development and cross discipline necessity of resource description.

In the 21st century, the usage of open data, open source and open protocols like OAI-PMH has allowed thousands of libraries and institutions to collaborate on the production of global metadata services previously offered only by increasingly expensive commercial proprietary products. Tools like BASE and Unpaywall automate the search of an academic paper across thousands of repositories by libraries and research institutions.

=== Knowledge organization ===
Library science is very closely related to issues of knowledge organization; however, the latter is a broader term that covers how knowledge is represented and stored (computer science/linguistics), how it might be automatically processed (artificial intelligence), and how it is organized outside the library in global systems such as the internet. In addition, library science typically refers to a specific community engaged in managing holdings as they are found in university and government libraries, while knowledge organization, in general, refers to this and also to other communities (such as publishers) and other systems (such as the Internet). The library system is thus one socio-technical structure for knowledge organization.

The terms 'information organization' and 'knowledge organization' are often used synonymously. The fundamentals of their study - particularly theory relating to indexing and classification - and many of the main tools used by the disciplines in modern times to provide access to digital resources such as abstracting, metadata, resource description, systematic and alphabetic subject description, and terminology, originated in the 19th century and were developed, in part, to assist in making humanity's intellectual output accessible by recording, identifying, and providing bibliographic control of printed knowledge.

Information has been published that analyses the relations between the philosophy of information (PI), library and information science (LIS), and social epistemology (SE).

=== Ethics ===
Practicing library professionals and members of the American Library Association recognize and abide by the ALA Code of Ethics. According to the American Library Association, "In a political system grounded in an informed citizenry, we are members of a profession explicitly committed to intellectual freedom and freedom of access to information. We have a special obligation to ensure the free flow of information and ideas to present and future generations." The ALA Code of Ethics was adopted in the winter of 1939, and updated on June 29, 2021.

== See also ==
- Authority control – Unique headings used for bibliographic information
- Bibliography – Organized listing of books and the systematic description of them as objects
- Digital Asset Management – Cloud management system (DAM)
- Diversity in librarianship
- Glossary of library and information science
- Information history – Academic discipline
- Internet search engines and libraries – Collection of books, materials and media
- List of library and information science journals
- Libraries and the LGBTQ community – Library services to the LGBT community
- Library portal
- List of library associations
- Museology – Study of museums
- Museum informatics
- Outline of library science – Overview of and topical guide to library science
- Subject indexing – Classifying a document by index terms
- Timeline of women in library science
