= Enrique J. Lavernia =

Engineer and material scientist

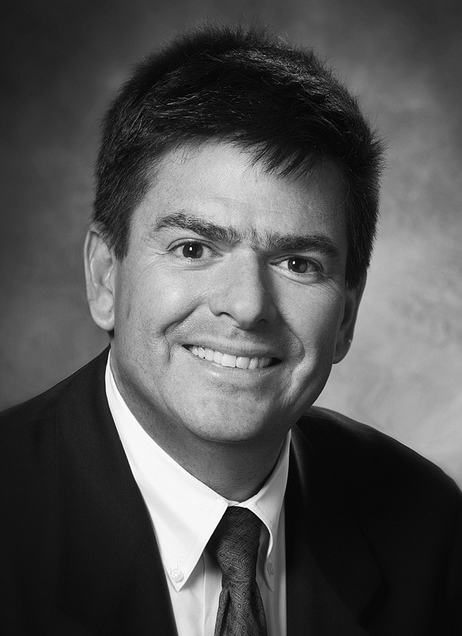
- Born: 1960 (age 65–66)
- Education: Brown University; MIT
- Scientific career
- Workplaces: UC Irvine; UC Davis

Enrique Jose Lavernia (born 1960) is a Cuban-American material scientist and engineer. He is currently Distinguished Professor of Materials Science and Engineering at the University of California, Irvine's Henry Samueli School of Engineering. From 2015 to 2021, he served as UC Irvine's provost and executive vice chancellor. Lavernia previously taught at the University of California, Davis, where he served as Dean of the College of Engineering and as the university's interim provost and executive vice chancellor.

== Education ==
Lavernia's family left Cuba in 1965. After attending high school in Puerto Rico, Lavernia matriculated at Brown University. He earned a Bachelor of Science with honors in solid mechanics at Brown in 1982. Lavernia completed a Master of Science and doctoral degree from the Massachusetts Institute of Technology in 1984 and 1986, respectively.

== Career ==
Lavernia joined UC Irvine in 1987 as an assistant professor. He eventually became chair of the Department of Chemical Engineering & Materials Science and a Chancellor's Professor before moving to UC Davis in 2002. Lavernia served as Dean of the UC Davis College of Engineering between 2002–2009 and 2011–2015. From January 2009 to January 2011, he served as the university's interim provost and executive vice chancellor. Lavernia returned to UC Irvine in 2015 as provost and executive vice chancellor.

He was placed on leave in March 2020 due a federal investigation into his academic and research activities. The results of the investigation have not been made public. He was ultimately succeeded in the role by Hal Stern. He is now the M. Katherine Banks Chair and professor of Materials Science & Engineering and Mechanical Engineering at Texas A&M University.

=== Honors and awards ===
- Foreign Member, Chinese Academy of Engineering, 2020
- 2020 Acta Materialia Gold Medal
- Fellow, National Academy of Inventors, 2016
- Fellow, National Academy of Engineering, 2013
