= Parachinar Public Library =

Public library in Khyber Pakhtunkhwa

- د پاراچنار عامه کتابتون
- 33°53′59″N 70°6′0″E
- Location: Parachinar, Khyber Pakhtunkhwa, Pakistan
- Type: Public library
- Established: 1982

Collection
- Items collected: Books
- Size: 4,000

The Parachinar Public Library is a public library in Parachinar, Khyber Pakhtunkhwa.

== History ==
Parachinar Public Library was founded in 1982 by Fazle Haq, then the governor of North-West Frontier Province. It was initially located near the deputy commissioner's office.

The library became operational in 1986 and was utilized by students and academics until 2006. Between 2007 and 2011, a period of regional militancy led to library's neglect. During this period, library management was minimal which resulted in a decline of visitors. Staffing consisted of a member of the Kurram Levies, who served as both a librarian and security guard without specialized training in library management. This situation led to gradual deterioration of its physical infrastructure and its role as a community educational resource.
