= Amy Brand =

American academic

- Born: 1962 (age 63–64); New York City, New York, U.S.
- Education: Barnard College (BA); MIT (PhD)
- Occupations: Director and publisher of MIT Press
- Years active: July 2015–present
- Spouse: Matt Brand

Amy Brand (born October 20, 1962) is an American academic. Brand is the current Director and Publisher of the MIT Press, a position she assumed in July 2015. Previously, Brand was the assistant provost of faculty appointments and information at Harvard University and vice president of Digital Science.

== Early life and education ==
Amy Brand grew up in Manhattan, where she had attended Barnard College. She moved to Cambridge, Massachusetts in 1985 for graduate school and has lived mainly in the Boston area since.

Brand received a Bachelor of Arts with a major in linguistics from Barnard College in 1985 and a Doctor of Philosophy in cognitive science from the Massachusetts Institute of Technology in 1989.

== Career ==
Brand was a postdoctoral researcher at the Institute for Research in Cognitive Science at the University of Pennsylvania in Philadelphia from 1989 until 1992, conducting research in child language development, but ultimately decided to switch careers and move into academic publishing. Her first position was as an acquisitions editor at Lawrence Erlbaum Associates in 1992.

In 1994, Brand joined the MIT Press as a cognitive science editor for Bradford Books, MIT Press' cognitive science imprint. She contributed to development of CogNet, MIT Press's digital cognitive science collection.

From 2000 to 2008, Brand served as CrossRef's director of development. In 2008, she joined Harvard University as the Office for Scholarly Communication project manager and was later promoted to Assistant Provost for Faculty Appointments and Information. Beginning in 2014, Brand served as vice president of academic and research relations and vice president of North America at Digital Science.

=== MIT Press directorship ===
Brand was named director of the MIT Press in July 2015. Chris Bourg, director of the MIT Libraries, stated that Brand's "breadth of experience across many sectors of the scholarly communication system makes her the ideal leader of the MIT Press at this time of tremendous change and opportunity in scholarly publishing." As director, Brand manages the Press through trade acquisition and growing books and journal digital offerings.

=== Affiliations ===
Brand currently serves on the boards of several information and media organizations, including the International Science Council, Creative Commons, the Royal Society of Chemistry, and the Coolidge Corner Theater Foundation. She is on the Research Data and Information Committee of the National Academies of Science, Engineering, and Medicine. She previously served on the Board of International Scientific Organizations of the National Academies of Sciences, Engineering, and Medicine,[8] the DuraSpace board of directors, and she chaired the academic advisory board of Altmetric, a commercial service that tracks how works of scholarship are discussed online.

Brand was executive producer of the documentary Picture a Scientist, a 2020 selection of the Tribeca Film Festival that highlights gender inequality in science.

Brand co-created the CRediT taxonomy to track contributions to team-based research outputs and was a founding member of the ORCID Board.

In September 2023, Brand appeared on the *Messy and Masterful* podcast, to discuss her career in academia and publishing, her work as executive producer of the documentary *Picture a Scientist*, and the importance of women in STEM.

== Awards ==
Brand was awarded the Laya Wiesner Community Award (2021) and the American Association for the Advancement of Science Kavli Science Journalism Gold Award (2021). In 2015, Brand was awarded the Award for Meritorious Achievement by the Council of Science Editors (CSE). This award is the highest given by the CSE and is given to “a person or institution that embraces the purposes of the CSE – the improvement of scientific communication through the pursuit of high standards in all activities connected with editing.”

== Publications ==
- Pierce, Amy. "On the emergence of syntax: A crosslinguistic study." Massachusetts Institute of Technology, Dept. of Brain and Cognitive Sciences, 1989.
- Grodzinsky, Yosef, Amy Pierce, Susan Marakovitz. "Neuropsychological reasons for a transformational analysis of verbal passive." Natural Language & Linguistic Theory 9 (3), 431-453, 1991.
- Pierce, Amy. "Language acquisition and syntactic theory: A comparative analysis of French and English child grammars." Kluwer Academic Pub, 1992.
- Pierce, Amy. "The acquisition of passives in Spanish and the question of A-chain maturation." Language Acquisition 2 (1), 55-81, 1992.
- Déprez, Viviane, Amy Pierce. "Negation and functional projections in early grammar." Linguistic Inquiry, 25-67, 1993.
- Déprez, Viviane, Amy Pierce. "Crosslinguistic evidence for functional projections in early child grammar." Language acquisition studies in generative grammar: papers in honor of Kenneth Wexler from the 1991 GLOW workshops, 1994.
- Brand, Amy. "CrossRef turns one." Corporation for National Research Initiatives, 2001.
- A Brand, E Pentz. "CrossRef: the reference linking backbone for scholarly electronic publication." ONLINE INFORMATION-INTERNATIONAL MEETING-, 183-186, 2001.
- Brand, Amy, Frank Daly, Barbara Meyers. "Metadata demystified: A guide for publishers." Sheridan Press and Niso Press, 2003.
- Brand, Amy, Kristen Fisher. "Linking evolved: The future of online research.", Scientific Computing World, 12-14, 2003.
- Brand, Amy. "Publishers joining forces through CrossRef." Serials Review 30 (1), 3-9, 2004.
- Brand, Amy. "CrossRef and the research experience." Learned publishing 17 (3), 225-230, 2004.
- Brand, Amy. "CrossRef Search." Serials 17 (3), 291-292, 2004.
- Brand, Amy, Chuck Koscher. "CrossRef: beyond journal reference linking." Serials 18 (3), 2005.
- Brand, Amy. "CROSSREF: From linking to cross-provider search." The Serials Librarian 50 (1-2), 119-124, 2006.
- Brand, Amy. "Mini-profile: a day in the life of a business development executive." Serials 19 (2), 83-84, 2006.
- Brand, Amy. Transl. Kumagai. "CrossRef: Towards the future." Journal of Information Processing and management, 50, 558-568, 2007.
- Brand, Amy. "Key Issue: CrossCheck." Serials 21 (1), 54-55, 2008.
- Brand, Amy. "Encyclopedia of Library and Information Sciences." 2009.
- Brand, Amy. "Beyond mandate and repository, toward sustainable faculty self-archiving." Learned Publishing 25 (1), 29-34, 2012.
- Scholarly Communication Symposium, Amy Brand, Lynne Herndon, Micah Altman. "Planning and Promoting the Creation of Scientific Knowledge: Three Perspectives." Georgetown University, Lauinger Library, 2012.
- Brand, Amy. "Faculty appointments and the record of scholarship." eLife 2, e00452, 2013.
- Brand, Amy. "Point of View: Faculty Appointments and the Record of Scholarship." Life Sciences Publications, Ltd., 2013.
- Allen, Liz, Amy Brand, Jo Scott, Micah Altman, Marjorie Hlava. "Credit where credit is due." Nature 508 (7496), 312-313, 2014.
- Brand, Amy, Liz Allen, Micah Altman, Marjorie Hlava, Jo Scott. "Beyond authorship: attribution, contribution, collaboration, and credit." Learned Publishing 28 (2), 151-155, 2015.
- Goldstone, Heather MH, Susan Skomal, Michael Markie, Amy Brand, Joshua P Gray. "Publishing returns to the Academy." MBLWHOI Library, 2015.
- Brand, Amy, James Butcher, Meg Buzzi, Kathleen Fitzpatrick, Ann Gabriel, Rikk Mulligan, Vivian Siegel, Matt Spitzer, Jamie Vernon. "Report from the 'What is Publishing?'(1) Workgroup." Open Scholarship Initiative Proceedings 1, 2016.
- Greco, Albert N., Robert M. Wharton, Amy Brand. "Demographics of scholarly publishing and communication professionals." Learned Publishing, 2016.

== Personal life ==
Brand lives in Newton, Massachusetts, with her husband, Matthew Brand, and has three children.
