= Isidore Loeb =

French scholar

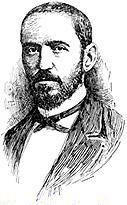
- Isidore Loeb (1839–1892)
- Born: 1 November 1839; Soultzmatt, Haut-Rhin, France
- Died: 3 June 1892 (aged 52)

Isidore Loeb (1 November 1839 – 3 June 1892) was a French scholar born in Soultzmatt, Haut-Rhin. The son of Rabbi Seligmann Loeb of Sulzmatt, he was educated in Bible and Talmud by his father. After having followed the usual course in the public school of his native town, Loeb studied at the college of Rouffach and at the lycée of Colmar, in which city he at the same time attended classes in Hebrew and Talmud at the preparatory rabbinical school founded by Chief Rabbi Solomon Klein. In 1856 he entered the Central Rabbinical School (École Centrale Rabbinique) in Metz, where he soon ranked high through his knowledge of Hebrew, his literary ability, and his proficiency in mathematics. In 1862 he was graduated, and received his rabbinical diploma from the Séminaire Israélite de France in Paris, which had replaced (1859) the Metz École Centrale Rabbinique.

== Activities ==
Loeb did not immediately enter upon a rabbinical career, but tutored for some years, first in Bayonne, France and then in Paris. In 1865 he was called to the rabbinate of St. Etienne (Loire). His installation sermon, on the duties of the smaller congregations (Les Devoirs des Petites Communautés), is one of the best examples of French pulpit rhetoric.

Soon, however, he felt a desire to extend the field of his activity. He went to Paris, where he was appointed (1 June 1869) secretary of the Alliance Israélite Universelle, which position he held until his death. It was largely due to Loeb's labors that this association became an important factor in the progress of Oriental Judaism; and he created the library of the Alliance, which is one of the most valuable Jewish libraries in existence. Meanwhile, he continued his historical and philological researches, and developed an extensive literary activity. The chair of Jewish history in the Rabbinical Seminary of Paris having become vacant through the death of Albert Cohn (1877), Loeb was appointed his successor. He held this position for 12 years. His main activity, however, was devoted to the Société des Etudes Juives, which was organized in Paris in 1880. Beginning with the first number, he successfully edited the Revue des Études Juives, the organ of that society, and was, moreover, a voluminous and brilliant contributor thereto.

The following works published by Loeb deserve especial notice:

- La Situation des Israélites en Turquie, en Serbie, et en Roumanie (1869)
- Biographie d'Albert Cohn (1878)
- Tables du Calendrier Juif Depuis l'Ere Chrétienne Jusqu'au XXX Siècle
- La controverse sur le Talmud sous saint Louis (1881)
- Les Juifs de Russie (1891)
- La Littérature des Pauvres dans la Bible
- Réflexions sur les Juifs.

The two last-named works have been published by the Société des Études Juives. Isidore Loeb died in Paris on 3 June 1892.

== Jewish Encyclopedia bibliography ==
- I. Lévi, list of Loeb's works, in Revue des Études Juives vol. xxiv.;
- Zadoc Kahn, biographical sketch, ib.
