= Arleen McCarty Hynes =

American bibliotherapy pioneer, librarian, and Benedictine nun (1916–2006)

Sister Arleen McCarty Hynes O. S. B.
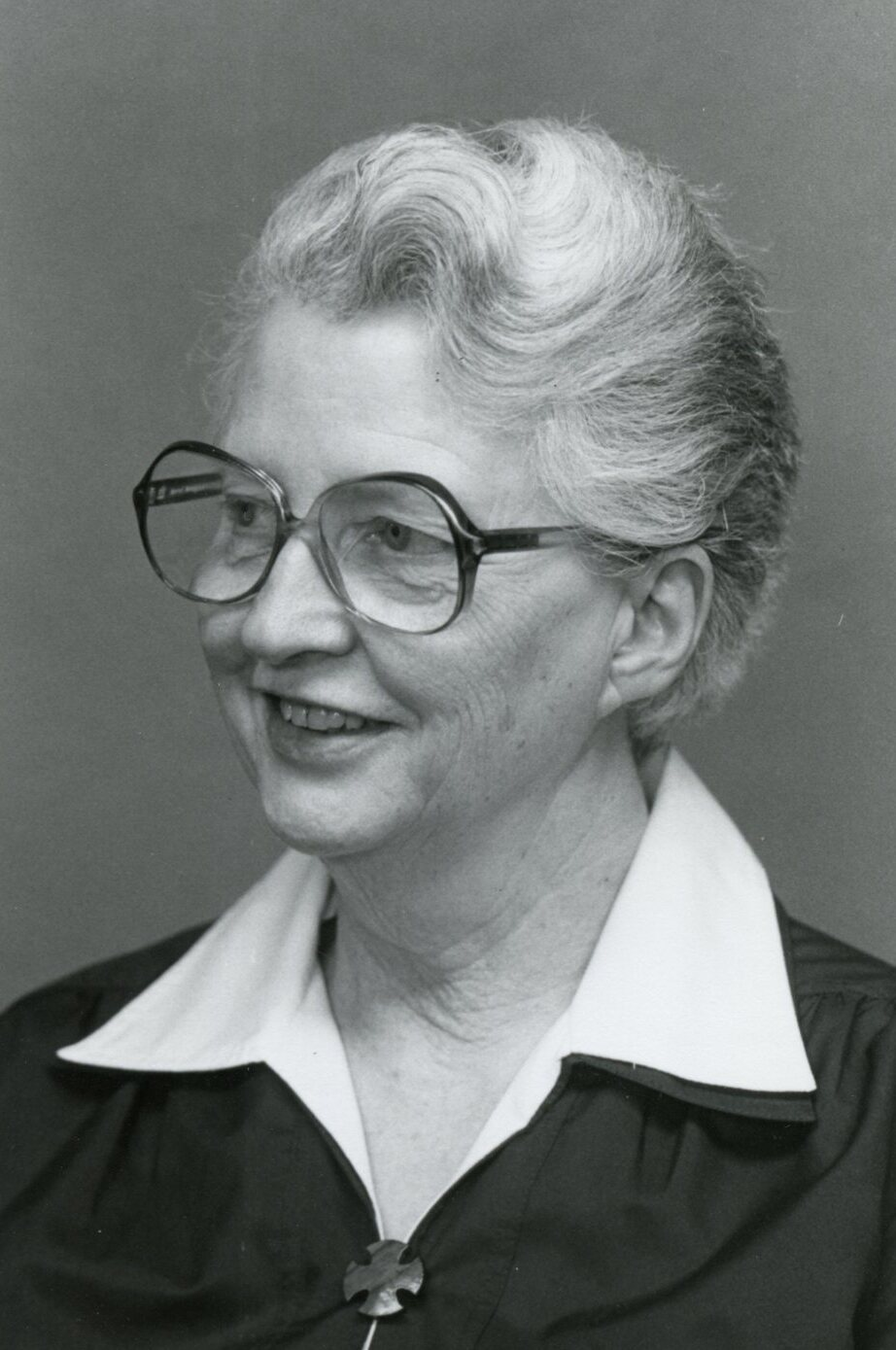

Personal life
- Born: May 3, 1916 Sheldon, Iowa
- Died: September 5, 2006 (aged 90) St. Cloud, Minnesota

Religious life
- Religion: Roman Catholic

Arleen McCarty Hynes (1916–2006) was a librarian, and later a Roman Catholic sister, who pioneered bibliotherapy. Hynes received the Dorothea Dix award for her contributions, including an important book that remains standard. She is, in the words of Shifra Baruchson-Arbib, "the person credited for creating the practical concept of modern bibliotherapy," and in the words of Dr. Nicholas Mazza, "one of the pioneers of biblio/poetry therapy."

== Early life and education ==
She was born Mary Arleen McCarty, the daughter of Mary Gannon McCarty, who was born in Ballina Ireland, and Veatus Cantious McCarty, born in Iowa. She was one of a pair of premature identical twins, and her mother died in that childbirth. Because her father had seven other children to raise, she and her sister were brought up by a paternal aunt and uncle, Josie Dunn McCarty and James Maurice McCarty. After attending public elementary and high school, she graduated from Sheldon Junior College in 1936, and then attended the Vogue School of Dress Design (part of Vogue magazine) from 1936 to 1937. She then went to the College of St. Catherine in Minnesota for two years (1938–40), graduated with degree in Library Science and worked for one year at Mandan North Dakota High School before her marriage.

== Career ==
=== Work in Collegeville, Minnesota ===
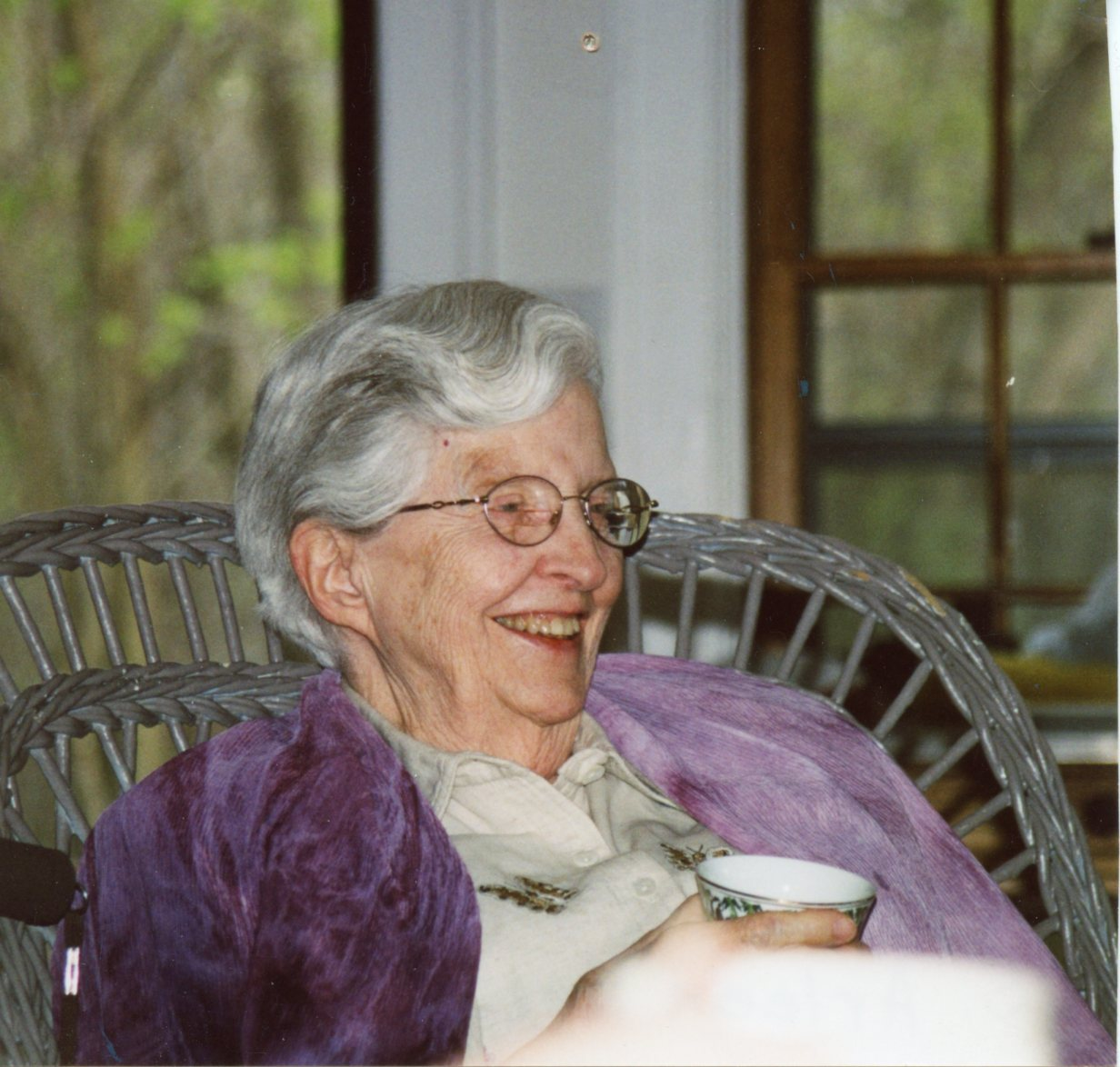

After her marriage to Emerson Hynes, a professor at St. John's University in Collegeville, Minnesota, she worked in the College of St. Benedict library. She and her husband hosted guests that included monks and visitors from St. John's, and they also brought together groups of Catholic artists, writers, and thinkers who were part of what was called "The Movement," including Dorothy Day, sculptor Don Humphrey, and J. F. and Betty Powers. Powers called her husband Emerson "a fervent practitioner and leader in the Catholic rural- and family-life movements." Arleen Hynes was part of the Catholic Rural Life Movement, the Liturgical Movement, and the Christian Family Movement, and she served a term as National Family Life Chair for the Council of Catholic Women. As progressive Catholics they were both active in the Catholic Worker movement, and the Agrarian society.

=== Work with Senator Eugene McCarthy in Washington, DC ===
In 1959, Democrat Eugene McCarthy (not to be confused with Republican Joseph McCarthy of the 1950s anticommunist hearings) was elected a Senator from Minnesota. Hynes's husband Emerson had gone to college at St. John's with McCarthy, and been the best man in his wedding. Emerson Hynes left a 20-year academic career to move the family to Washington and become McCarthy's legislative assistant. They lived in Arlington, Virginia, and she served on the National Council on Aging, hosted a study group on Vatican II, and was president of the Virginia chapter of the American Association of University Women, producing an important study in 1962.

McCarthy ran for president in 1968, and Arleen Hynes served as the head of Volunteers for McCarthy. Emerson Hynes suffered a small stroke and took disability leave from McCarthy's office. He retired in 1968 after McCarthy lost his bid to gain the US presidential nomination. The stress from the loss of their son, Michael, who drowned in the Potomac river in 1970 at age 18, may have weakened his health. The failed campaign also took a toll, and the combination may have led to Emerson Hynes's second, more serious stroke. He died of a heart attack at age 56 in 1971, eleven months after Michael died, leaving Arleen widowed with 9 children, and the youngest three still living at home.

=== Developing bibliotherapy at St. Elizabeths Hospital ===
I would pose questions that allowed [mental patients] to strip the poem down to its very core - questions that would help them to integrate the poem into their vision of themselves.

* * *

Sister Arleen McCarty Hynes to the National Catholic Reporter, December 2001.

In 1970, shortly before her husband's anticipated death and at his urging, Hynes found work as a patient's librarian at St. Elizabeths Hospital in Southeast Washington, DC, the nation's only federal mental hospital. They assigned her a room for the library that had formerly been the morgue. Although the library had existed since 1903 and was one of the earliest patient libraries in the country, it had no windows, only one skylight, and 10,000 uncatalogued books, with many piled high on the floor.

She expanded the library's services to more than 100 patients a week out of a population of 4,000, launched a lecture series and movie screenings, and allowed patients to read in the library and listen to music. She collected artwork that they could borrow to put in their rooms. She began a program reading to patients who she said "had never been read to before," and the groups included people who had experienced homelessness, battered women, former felons, alcoholics, and drug addicts.

She described a favorite group:

[It was] Last Renaissance, in the drug program. They lived together and they were really street people who were severe drug addicts. They came over every Monday morning. I was very pleased because early on, in 1971, a patient in the Last Renaissance program came to me and said they’d heard I read poetry on Friday afternoons and asked if they could have a program for themselves. The group fluctuated from as high as thirty to down around fifteen. At first they wanted all poetry, but after a while a group member suggested looking at Erich Fromm’s Art of Loving. So I’d take a paragraph or two in to them and they’d 'cut it up,' that’s what they called it, and find the application to their lives.

It was a great group. I did it for ten years with whoever was in the program. I’ll always remember how the image that really struck them over and over was Narcissus. They’d sit there and literally look down at the floor and say 'yeah, yeah, I’d just look at myself and think what a sharp dude I was in my slick clothes. I didn’t care about my woman. I didn’t care about my kids, or my mother or my grandmother or anybody else when I was on drugs. All I cared about was me.'

They were excited and loved it. I think it speaks to the fact that almost everybody would like to use their minds given the opportunity to have people listen to them seriously. We were all really listening. Then I’d ask them to write and they’d write. Even though many had an eighth-grade education or less, they would write. Yes. That was the group I loved the best.

Early forerunners of the bibliotherapy she developed and taught were R. H. Schauffler's 1927 book The Poetry Cure: The Medicine Chest of Verse, Music and Picture, psychiatrist Smiley Blanton's 1960 The Healing Power of Poetry, and Dr. Jack Leedy's 1969 Poetry Therapy: The Use of Poetry in the Treatment of Emotional Disorders, among others.

Leedy's work inspired hers the most, and in the early 1970s, based on much of this work and more, she first founded the Bibliotherapy Roundtable, introducing the term widely and hosting lectures and readings. She embarked on a 1,000-hour program of work, analysis, and study to become a registered poetry therapist. After completing her own supervised training, she trained another bibliotherapist who became the first in the federal system, and she established the first such position as a government job. She was also a key figure in the founding of two other organizations that her daughter, Mary Hynes-Berry, considers as even more important for the recognition of this practice as a profession, the National Association for Poetry Therapy (NAPT), and the National Federation for Biblio/Poetry Therapy, which changed its name to the International Federation for Biblio-Poetry Therapy.

She was engaged with patients' drug therapies, but asserted that a therapy based on books and reading could also be healing. As Patricia Lefevre wrote of an interview with Hynes,

Once a man who had not spoken for years began relating to a poem, expressing a point of view. Another, who did not know his name and who had spent years staring at the ceiling, started to make relevant comments. Hynes began to witness the power of words to mend and watched as some of the sickest patients in the back wards got transferred onto 'looser' wards.

However, none of the aforementioned books functioned as a comprehensive text, so her 1986 book was needed. She based it on a training program she launched in 1984, and her need for a text. After the book's publication, she and Dr. Kenneth Gorelick, head of psychiatric training, established the first training course in bibliotherapy, along with a certification program. They worked closely with bibliotherapist Rosalie Brown, whom Hynes helped hire.

=== Entrance into religious life ===
After leaving her job at St. Elizabeth's in 1981, she returned to Minnesota to enter the Sisters of St. Benedict in St. Joseph, Minnesota, just a few miles from St. John's and Collegeville. She professed first vows on the Feast of St. Benedict, July 11, 1981, almost 10 years to the date since her husband's death, and perpetual vows on the same date in 1985. For two decades she was a staffer and occasional instructor in the monastery Spirituality Center. She worked with battered women at a shelter, and with seniors and jail inmates. She is buried at St. Benedict's Monastery in Minnesota. A short feature about the creation of this Wikipedia article via Women in Red and about her life appeared in the Spring 2024 edition of Benedictine Sisters and Friends magazine.

== Books ==
She and one of her daughters published a 1986 book that the National Association for Poetry Therapy called "the first comprehensive text" on the subject of bibliotherapy. As of 2024 it has been in continuous print for 38 years.

- Hynes, Arleen M.; Hynes-Berry, Mary (2012). Biblio/Poetry Therapy, the Interactive Process: A Handbook. Updated and revised by Joy Roulier Sawyer (3rd ed.). St. Cloud, MN: North Star Press of St. Cloud, Inc. ISBN 9780878394104.
- Hynes, Arleen McCarty (1972). Passover Meal: A ritual for Christian homes Paperback. Paulist Press. ISBN 0809116537.

=== Other publications ===
- Hynes, Arleen McCarty; Gorelick, Kenneth (1986). Proceedings of the Fourth Bibliotherapy Round Table : January 28 and 29, 1977, Washington, D.C. Westview Press.
- Hynes, Arleen McCarty (1978), “Certification in the St. Elizabeth’s Hospital Bibliotherapy Training Program,” in Rhea J. Rubin (ed.), Using Bibliotherapy: A Guide to Theory and Practice (Phoenix, Arizona: Oryx Press), 201–12.
- Hynes, Arleen McCarty (1978), “Bibliotherapy in the Circulating Library at St. Elizabeth’s Hospital,” in Rhea J. Rubin (ed.), Bibliotherapy Source Book (Phoenix, Arizona: Oryx Press), 300–304.
- Hynes, Arleen Mccarty (1980). "The Goals of Bibliotherapy". Arts in Psychotherapy. 7: 35–41. doi:10.1016/0197-4556(80)90037-4.
- Hynes, Arleen Mccarty (1990). "Poetry: An avenue into the Spirit". Journal of Poetry Therapy. 4 (2): 71–81. doi:10.1007/bf01078545.

== Awards ==
- Dorothea Dix award, 1978, from St. Elizabeths Hospital for her contributions to the institution.
- National Association for Poetry Therapy (NAPT) award, 2002.

== Personal life ==
She married Merton Emerson Hynes, who went by the name Emerson, on June 26, 1941, at St. John's University in Collegeville, Minnesota, where he was a faculty member, teaching ethics, sociology, and philosophy. They were both Benedictine oblates of the adjoining St. John's Abbey. The couple lived on a farm in the woods where they raised their own vegetables, kept cows and chickens, and built a house called Kilfenora, named after a village in County Clare, Ireland. They had 10 children. Their eighth child and sixth son T.More (sic) called them "hippies before their time."
