= Ann Wolpert =

American librarian

Ann J. Wolpert
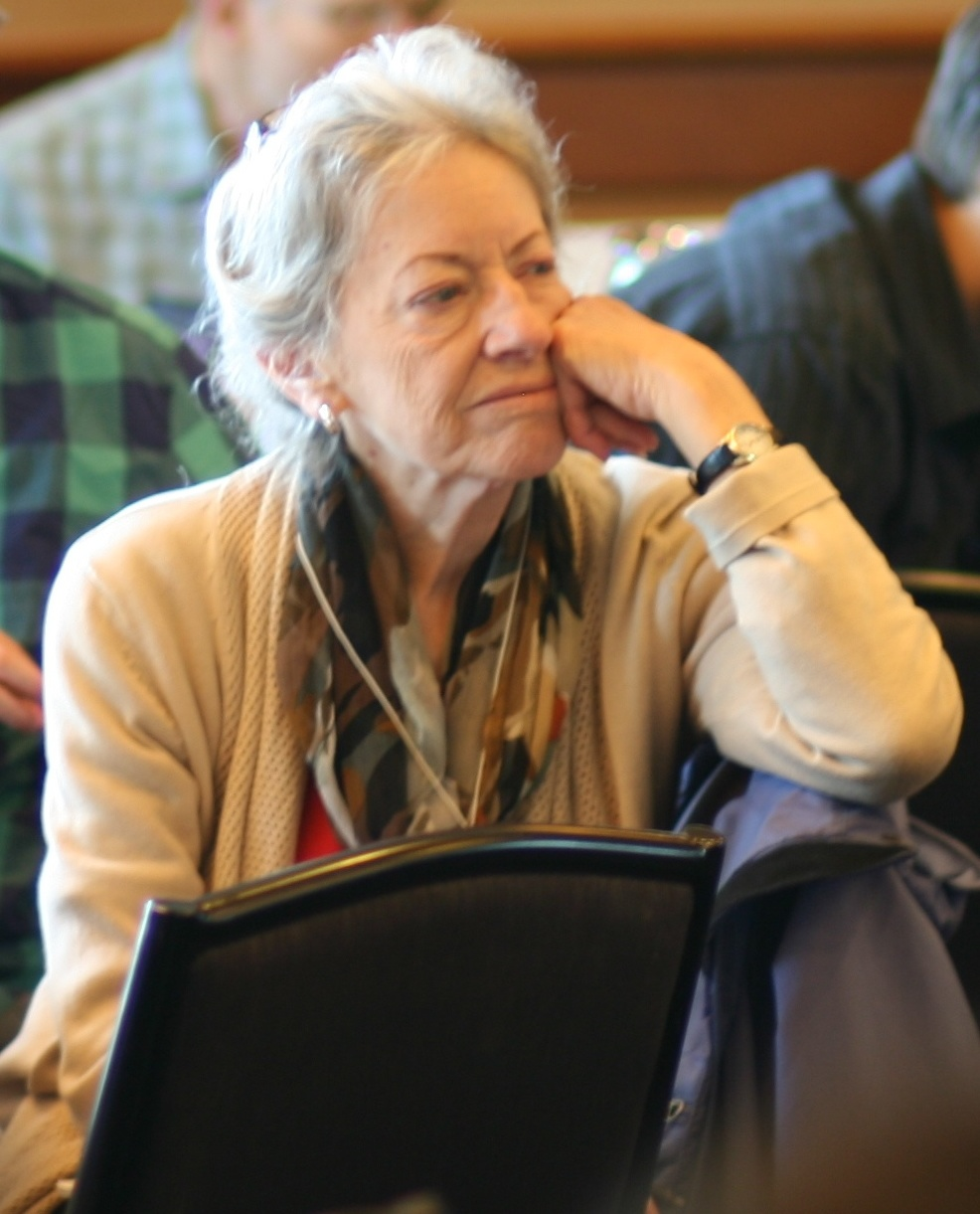
- Born: Ann Josephine Wolpert; October 1, 1943
- Died: October 2, 2013 (aged 70)
- Education: MLS
- Alma mater: Simmons College, Boston
- Occupation: Librarian
- Employer: Massachusetts Institute of Technology
- Known for: DSpace
- Title: Director of libraries

Ann Josephine Wolpert (October 1, 1943 – October 2, 2013) was an American librarian who was a pioneer in digital libraries. As director of the Massachusetts Institute of Technology Libraries from 1996 to 2013, she was instrumental in a variety of projects, including leading an initiative between MIT and Hewlett Packard to develop the DSpace digital repository system, and supporting MIT OpenCourseWare, one of the earliest large-scale projects to provide open access to university course materials. She also championed MIT's adoption of an open access mandate in 2009, the first of its kind in the United States.

She advised and contributed to many core library organizations as well as initiatives that sought to transform the way research institutions and their libraries collaborate to solve large problems. Over her career, she served on the boards of directors of the Boston Library Consortium, the National Academies' Board of Research Data and Information (BRDI), DuraSpace, and the Digital Preservation Network (DPN); on the steering committee of the Coalition for Networked Information (CNI); as the council chair of the International Consortium for Political and Social Research (ICPSR); and served in significant advisory roles in many other organizations.

== Life ==
Wolpert earned a BA from Boston University and an MLS from Simmons College.

From 1967 to 1976, she was librarian at the Boston Redevelopment Authority. From 1976 to 1992, she worked for Arthur D. Little.

From 1993 to 1995, she was director of library and information services, at Harvard Business School.

From 1996 to 2013, she was the Director of Libraries at MIT. As director of libraries, Wolpert managed the MIT Libraries and had reporting oversight of the MIT Press. Chris Bourg took over the role in 2015.

In 2005, she was president of the Association of Research Libraries.

== Family ==
She married Samuel A. Otis Jr.

== Awards and recognition ==
Wolpert was named to part of the National Network for Women Leaders in Higher Education by the American Council of Education.

== Works ==
- Ann J. Wolpert, M.L.S. (February 28, 2013). "For the Sake of Inquiry and Knowledge — The Inevitability of Open Access". N. Engl. J. Med. 368 (9): 785–787. doi:10.1056/NEJMp1211410. PMID 23445088.
- Wolpert, Ann J. (7 November 2002). "The future of electronic data". Nature. 420 (6911): 17–18. Bibcode:2002Natur.420...17W. doi:10.1038/420017a. PMID 12422185. S2CID 10260225.
