= Chris Bourg =

American librarian and sociologist

- Education: Duke University; University of Maryland; Stanford University
- Employer: Massachusetts Institute of Technology
- Website: https://chrisbourg.wordpress.com/

Chris Bourg is an American librarian, sociologist, and former officer of the United States Army. She has been the Director of Massachusetts Institute of Technology Libraries since 2015, and is also the founding director of the Center for Research on Equitable and Open Scholarship (CREOS) at MIT. Bourg is an advocate for open access and open science, serving on the Board of Directors of organizations such as the Center for Open Science, the Center for Open and Reproducible Science at Stanford's Data Science Institute (DSI-CORES), and open access publisher Annual Reviews.

== Education ==
Bourg graduated with a B.A. from Duke University in 1987 and a M.A. in sociology from the University of Maryland in 1994. She went on to study sociology at Stanford University where she completed an M.A. and PhD. Her doctoral thesis, titled Gender Mistakes and Inequality (2003), was supervised by Cecilia L. Ridgeway. Prior to her career in libraries, Bourg spent 10 years as an officer in the United States Army, teaching for three years as a faculty member at West Point.

== Career ==
Bourg worked at Stanford University for 12 years where she held several roles including associate university librarian for public services. She became the director of Massachusetts Institute of Technology Libraries in February 2015, overseeing both the library and The MIT Press. She took over the role from previous director Ann Wolpert, who had been in the position for 17 years. Bourg then chaired the search committee to find a new director for the MIT Press, hiring Amy Brand effective July 2015. Bourg continues to serve on the MIT Press Management Board.

Bourg was asked to convene the MIT Ad Hoc Task Force on the Future of Libraries in October 2015, to co-chair the MIT Ad Hoc Task Force on Open Access to MIT’s Research with Hal Abelson in 2017, and to co-chair the MIT Working Group on Scholarly Content and Generative AI with Claire Schneider in 2025. Bourg is a member of the Roundtable on Aligning Incentives for Open Science of the National Academies of Sciences, Engineering, and Medicine, and of the Higher Education Leadership Initiative for Open Scholarship.

Bourg is a frequent public speaker and has given multiple conference keynotes. In a 2018 keynote at a Code4LIb conference, she discussed diversity in software development. The talk, which referenced research by the Kapor Center for Social Impact indicating record numbers of people are leaving tech environments due to discrimination, resulted in online harassment and personal attacks. As of April 3, 2018, the Council of Prairie and Pacific University Libraries (COPPUL) and hundreds of other organizations and individuals signed the Code4Lib Community Statement in Support of Chris Bourg.

Bourg is known for talking openly about and challenging systemic racism within the library profession. She has also called into question the neutrality of librarianship. During an American Library Association panel in 2018 Bourg argued against the possibility of neutrality concluding that: "If we believe that libraries have any role to play in supporting and promoting truth in our current post-truth culture, then our work is political and not neutral."

Bourg is vocal in support of open access publishing and open science. Bourg is the founding director of the Center for Research on Equitable and Open Scholarship (CREOS) at MIT. Bourg serves on the Board of Directors of organizations such as the Center for Open Science, the Center for Open and Reproducible Science at Stanford's Data Science Institute (DSI-CORES), and Annual Reviews. In 2013 Bourg, along with the editor-in-chief and other board members of the Journal of Library Administration, resigned as a sign of support for open-access publishing following the death of Aaron Swartz.

== Select publications ==
=== Chapters ===
- Segal, Mady Wechsler; Bourg, Chris (2005). "Professional leadership and diversity in the army". In Matthews, Lloyd J. (ed.). The future of the Army profession (2nd rev. & expanded ed.). Boston: McGraw-Hill. ISBN 9780073536095.
- Jones, Shannon D.; Murphy, Beverly, eds. (2019). "Introduction". Diversity and inclusion in libraries : a call to action and strategies for success. Lanham, Maryland: Rowman & Littlefield. ISBN 9781538114407.

=== Articles ===
- "The Library Concierge Project at Stanford University". The Journal of Creative Library Practice. 6 June 2013.
- Sadler, Bess; Bourg, Chris (15 April 2015). "Feminism and the Future of Library Discovery". The Code4Lib Journal (28). ISSN 1940-5758.
- Bourg, Chris; Kriegsman, Sue; Lindsay, Nick; Sardis, Heather; Stalberg, Erin; Altman, Micah (27 March 2024). "Generative AI for Trustworthy, Open, and Equitable Scholarship". An MIT Exploration of Generative AI. doi:10.21428/e4baedd9.567bfd15.
- Thomas, Ashley; Bourg, Chris; Saxe, Rebecca (May 2025). "Beliefs about social dynamics and open science". Royal Society Open Science. 12 (5). doi:10.1098/rsos.230061. PMC 12096108.
- Thomas, Ashley; Hok, Hannah; Bourg, Chris; Saxe, Rebecca (12 March 2026). "Support for open science is equally high in opt-in versus representative samples of scientists from a research-focused US university". Quantitative Science Studies. 7: 72–82. doi:10.1162/qss.a.398.
