= Northern New York Library Network =

The Northern New York Library Network is one of New York’s nine Reference and Research Resources Councils. These organizations are chartered by the New York State Board of Regents, and charged with facilitating cooperative library services and improving reference and research resources for the people of New York.

The Northern New York Library Network's service area consists of seven counties: Clinton, Essex, Franklin, St. Lawrence, Lewis, Oswego, and Jefferson. Network services include a shared regional catalog, statewide online historical newspapers, and regional historical documents and images online. The regional online historical newspaper website and the regional historical documents and images website have been expanded to include all of New York State in cooperation with the other Reference and Research Resources Councils.

The network also provides a robust continuing education program, with classes in applied technology, library management, and best library practices. The current continuing education calendar may be found at https://nnyln.org/explore-events/. Education events are provided through distance learning technology as well as traditional classroom settings.

Other services provided to member libraries by the Network include: Medical Information Program – a service where doctors, nurses, and other health care providers in small, regional facilities receive professional medical library services from a nearby hospital library.

Resource Sharing Program: The Network provides Due North, a simple interlibrary loan web-based interlibrary loan system which federates holdings from all members and allows libraries to make and manage requests among all types of Northern New York libraries, whether academic, public, prison, or other type.

The Network provides support for borrowing beyond the region through Worldshare ILL, and provides support for the ground delivery of research materials. The Network also provides fiscal support to for regional access research data bases, including WorldCat, regional newspapers, Wilson Omnifile (EBSCO), and The Watertown Daily Times.

The Network is governed by a locally elected Board of Trustees, and functions under New York State law and New York State Education Department regulations. The Network's Plan of Service provides a detailed overview of products and services available to member libraries. The Network's web site at https://nnyln.org provides detail on all these programs.

Published reference source: New York State Department of Education
