= Château Wagenbourg =

French castle

Coordinates: 47.9593°N 7.2420°E

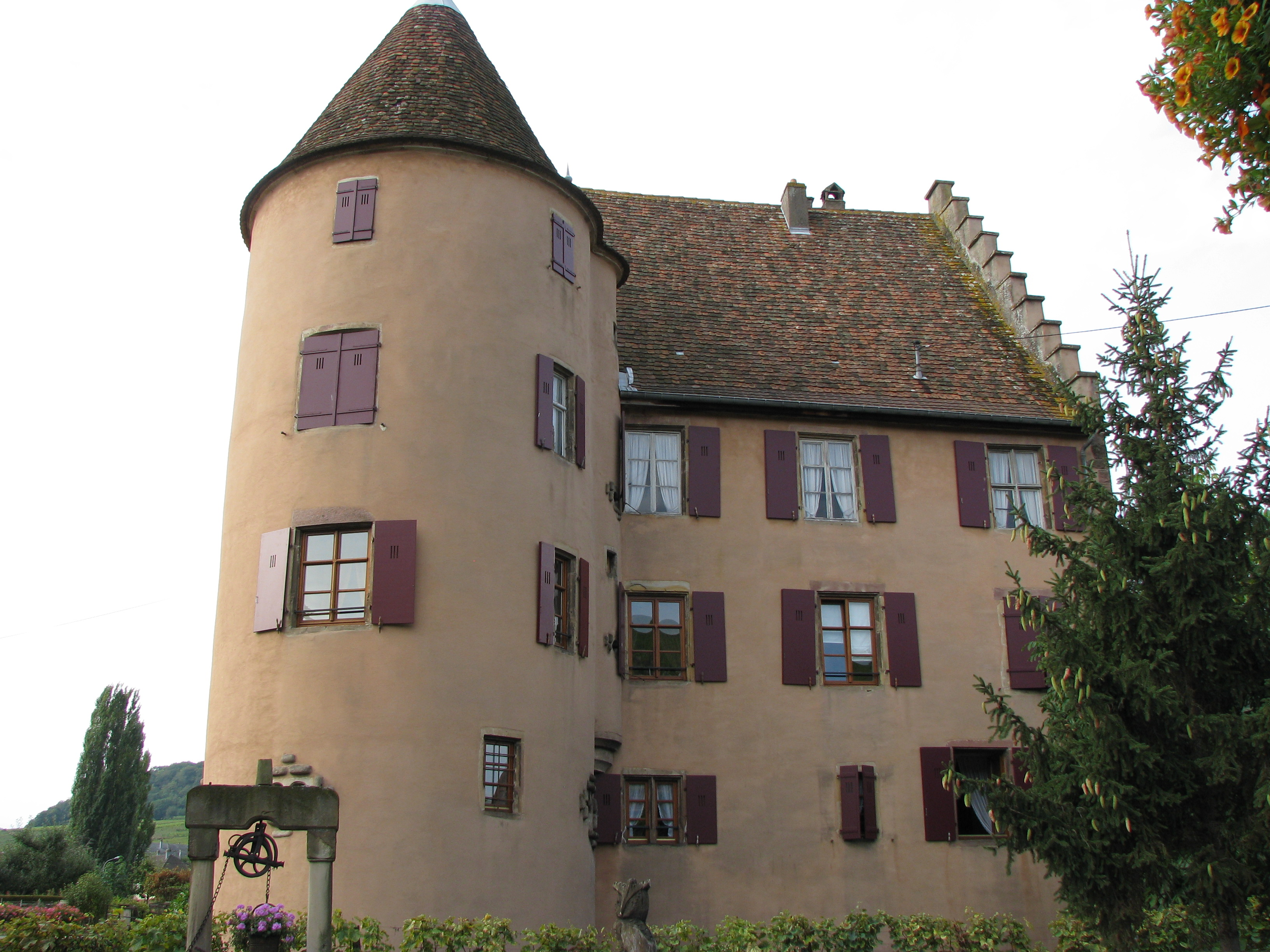
Château Wagenbourg on Valley Street, Soultzmatt, France

Château Wagenbourg is a castle in the commune of Soultzmatt, in the department of Haut-Rhin, Alsace, France. It has been a listed historical monument since 1987. It has been owned by the family of Joseph and Jacky Klein since 1905.
