= Shifra Baruchson Arbib =

Israeli historian (1951-)

- שפרה ברושסון ארביב
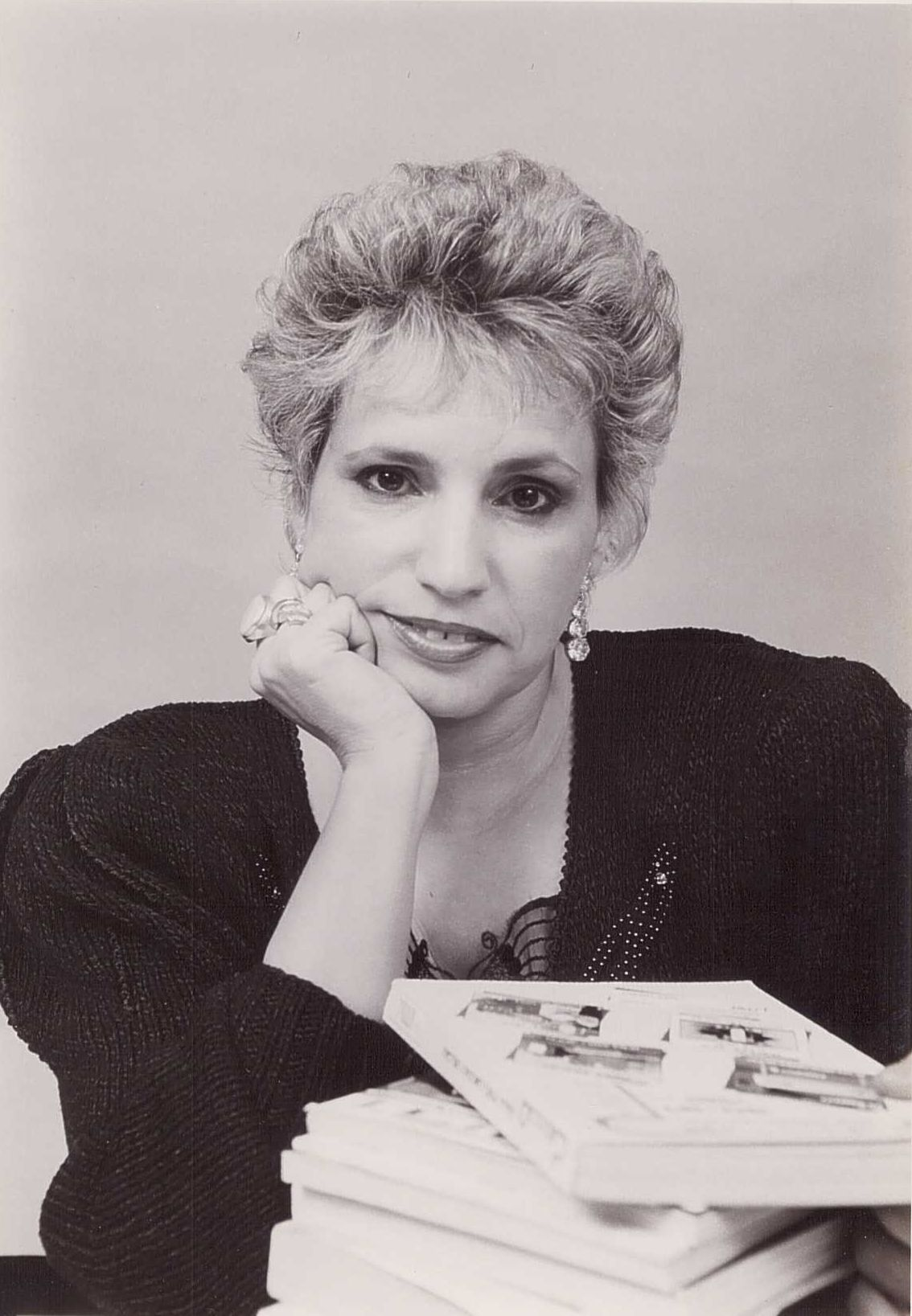
- Born: 1951 (age 74–75); Tel-Aviv
- Occupation: Professor
- Notable work: History of Hebrew Books and Manuscripts

Shifra Baruchson-Arbib (Hebrew: שפרה ברושסון ארביב; born 1951) is a Full Professor in the Department of Information Science at Bar-Ilan University Israel, specializing in the history and sociology of media. She was the Head of the Information Science Department (1990-1998, 2005-2008, 2012–2014) and has served as the Dean of the Faculty of Humanities at Bar- Ilan University (2015-2016). Her major achievements include her studies in the fields of the "History of Hebrew Books and Manuscripts" and of "Information Science", leading the Department of Information Science; and developing the academic field of Social Information Science.

== Biography ==
Shifra Baruchson-Arbib was born in December 1951 in Tel-Aviv, as Zipora Baruchson, to a learned rabbinical family. She is married to Chaim Eric Arbib. Her paternal grandfather, Rabbi Yitzhak Baruchson, was a descendant of 17 generations of Dayanim (judges of Jewish Law) and a leader in the Musar (Ethical) movement. Her maternal grandfather, Rabbi Avraham Sochovolski, was one of the first Scribes (Sofer Stam) in Tel-Aviv in the 1930s. Her father, Shlomo Baruchson, was the owner of the "Shalom publishing house" and was the first person in Israel to turn the Bible, the Siddur (prayer book), and the Haggadah (the prayer book of Passover) into gifts by using luxurious silver book covers using the work of the Bezalel Academy of Arts and Design in Israel. Baruchson-Arbib's uncle, Yehuda Makavy, was the owner of the "International Company of Publishing" house and he initiated and published the first historical-archeological project in Israel. This project was published in a series of books called "The view of the Biblical World", edited by the know archeologists Michael Avi-Yonah and Avraham Malamat, and "The Military Art in the Lands of the Bible", by Yigael Yadin. Baruchson-Arbib's family background greatly influenced her scientific and research work.

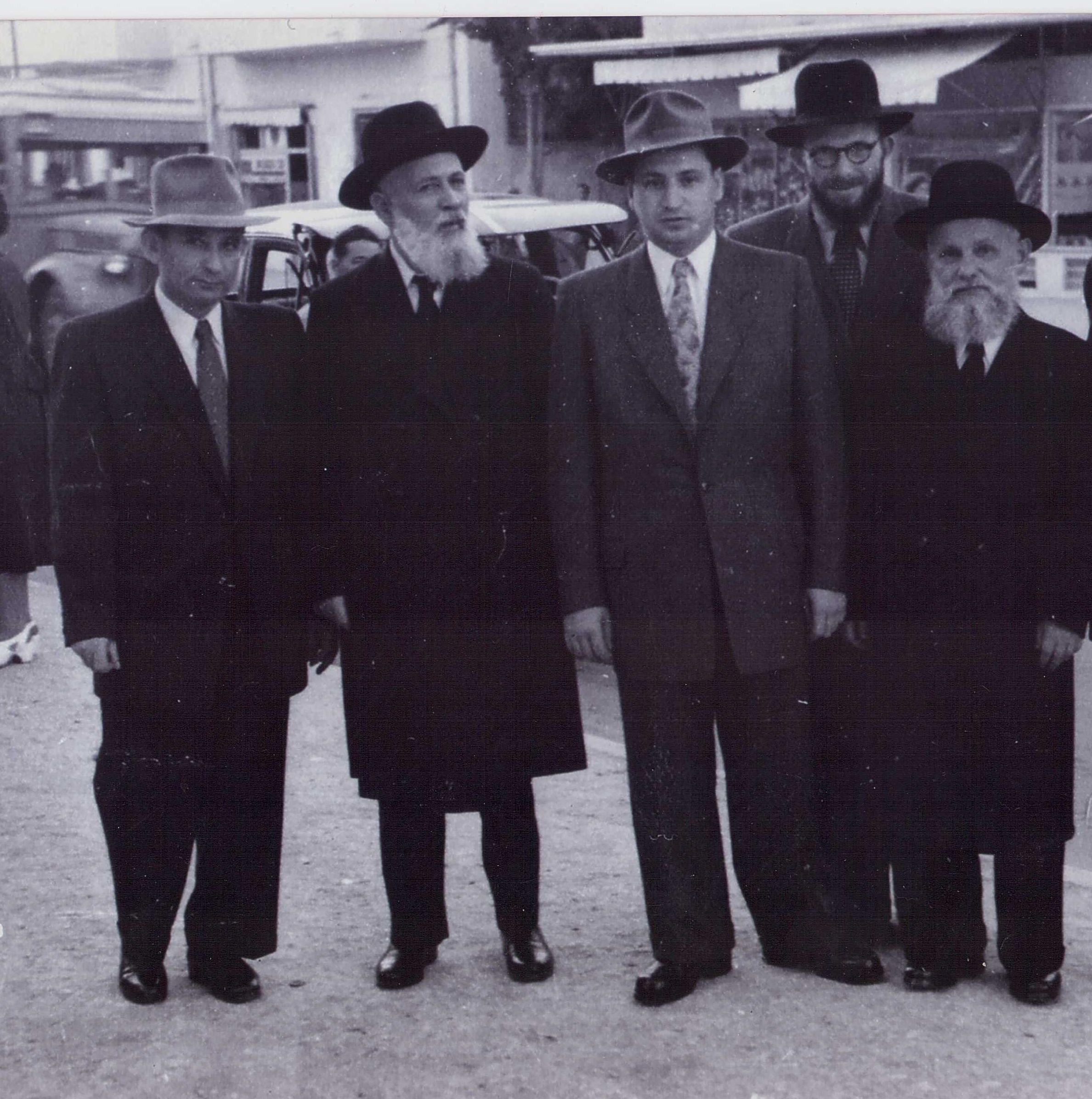
The family of Shifra Baruchson-Arbib. From right to left: Rabbi Avraham Sochovolski, Shlomo Baruchson, Rabbi Yitzhak Baruchson, Yehuda Makavy; back: Rabbi Haim Goldvicht; Tel-Aviv, 1950.

Baruchson-Arbib began her studies at Bar-Ilan University in 1970, in the Departments of Bible Studies, Jewish History, and Library Science. She completed her master's and doctorate degrees in the field of Jewish History in topics related to manuscripts, rare books, and the reading culture. In 1974, she began to work at Bar-Ilan University as a research assistant]. In 1990, Baruchson-Arbib was appointed Head of the Department of Bibliographical and Librarianship Studies at Bar-Ilan University. As only a few students were interested in the field at the time, she changed the name of the department and its content to The Department of Information Science. This interdisciplinary field is known throughout the world and regards the theory and practice of producing, collecting, processing, storing, retrieving, representing, and distributing information. The field aims to understand the process that information undergoes as it transforms from data to knowledge, and it trains information scientists, information managers, and librarians. Changing the name of the department and its curriculum increased the number of students in the department from 50 to 500 in two years, and it allowed its graduates to work in an innovative and modern field. Today, graduates of the department are employed in various fields, including in high-tech companies, industry, hospitals, libraries, and the private sector. To date, the Department of Information Science at Bar-Ilan University is the largest and most significant in the field in Israel, and it awards bachelor's, master's, and doctorate degrees. Baruchson-Arbib has served as the Head of the department for many years and has supervised more than 70 research students. She has also developed a new discipline in the field of Information Science – the "Social Information Science" discipline. which teaches to balance between information overload and the need for reliable and available information, especially in the fields of health and welfare.

In 1993, Baruchson-Arbib received the Zalman Shazar Award for Outstanding Research in Jewish History, due to her book "Books and Readers: The Reading Culture of Italian Jews at the Close of the Renaissance", which was published in that year. This book was based on her doctorate work and received the Award due to its innovative methodology and findings. In addition to her research activities, Baruchson-Arbib studied the Milton Erickson hypnosis technique in the United States, and she was accredited to practice hypnosis in the State of New York. Baruchson-Arbib has participated in numerous international conferences and has lectured at various universities, such as the Sorbonne in Paris and the University of British Columbia. She is currently a member of several organizations, including the International Center for Information Ethics (ICIE) and the Royal Society for the Encouragement of Arts, Manufactures & Commerce (RSA). In addition, she is a member of several journal boards, including the Israeli journal 'Alei Sefer: Studies in Bibliography and in the History of the Printed and the Digital Hebrew Book', the British 'Journal of Communication & Ethics in Society', and the Polish journal 'Przeglad Biblioteczny Library Review'. She is also a member of the board of directors of the 'Joshua and Bracha Barzilai Scholarship Fund for Jewish Bibliographic Research', a member of the board of directors of the 'Naima and Yehoshua Salti Center for Ladino Studies', and a member of the high-school professional committee for 'Digital Discovery and Finding' in the Ministry of Education. In addition to being the dean of Humanities at Bar-Ilan University, Baruchson-Arbib also teaches in the Department of Information Science, where she gives various courses and seminars on information ethics, the "digital man" in the information society, social information, and reference work. In 2013, she established the "Information 21" project, within which the annual conference "Information, Society, and Industry" is held.

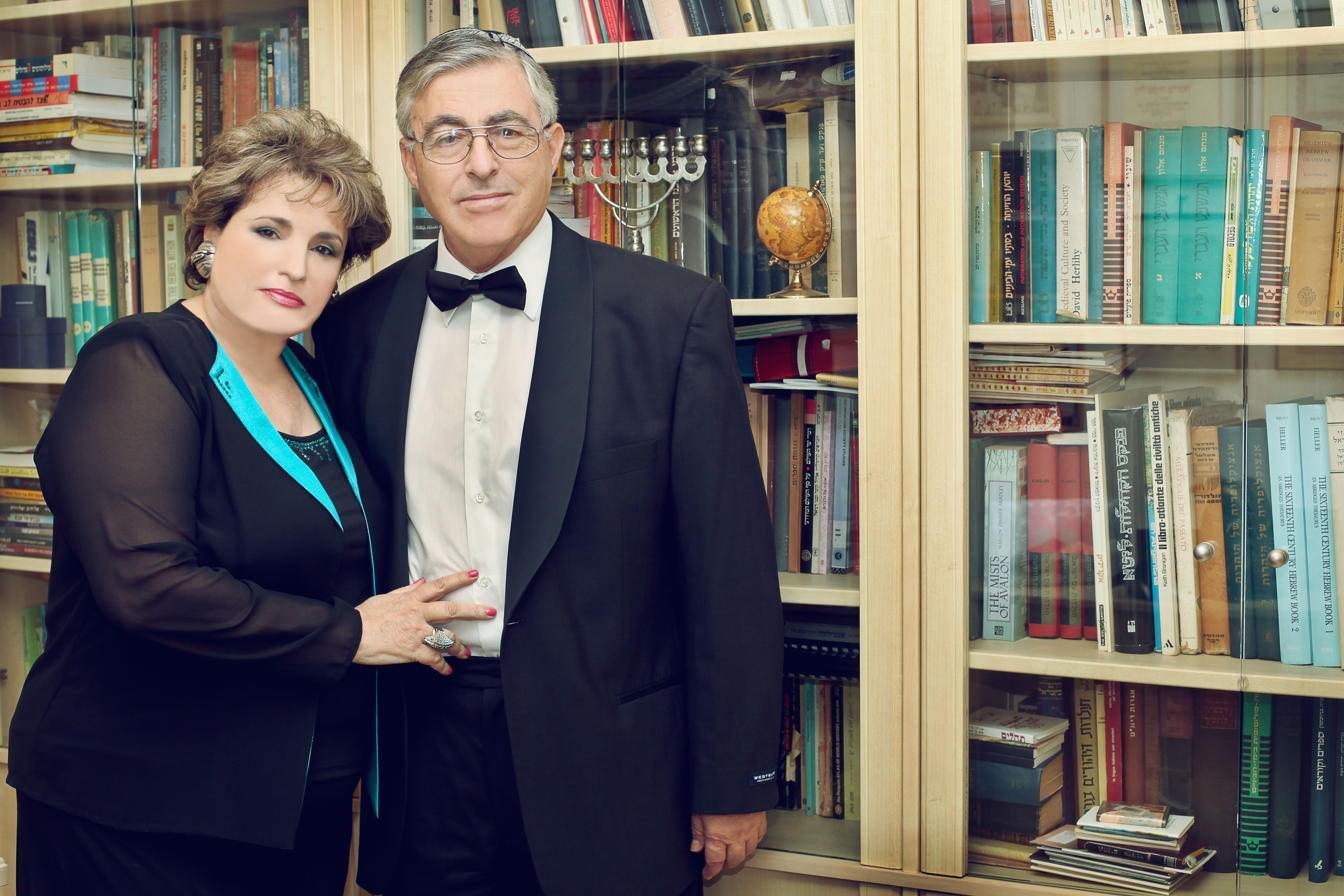
Shifra Baruchson-Arbib and Chaim Eric Arbib in their home, December 2011.

== Research ==
Until the 1990s, the research of Baruchson-Arbib consisted mainly of the study of Hebrew books, manuscripts, rare books, the reading culture, and the Interdisciplinary methodology of book research – also known as "the new bibliology". Since establishing the Department of Information Science, Baruchson-Arbib has published research in the fields of social information, public libraries, information behavior, library management, and information skills.

=== The study of Hebrew books ===
Baruchson-Arbib began studying the field of "Hebrew books" in her thesis on Rabbi Jacob Margalith and his writings. In that study, and in the related research publications that followed, the mystery of the controversial identity of Rabbi Jacob Margalith was solved, identifying him as a Rabbi who lived and served in the German cities of Nürnberg and Regensburg, and who died in 1501. Rabbi Jacob Margalith was the editor of the manuscript "Sedder Gittin Ve'Halitza" (The Ritual of Divorce and Levirate Marriage), which aimed to serve as a unified codex of the Jewish ruling in laws of the Gett (the Jewish divorce document) and was included in the Shulchan Aruch (the Code of Jewish Law). Within the hand-written manuscripts of this essay, Baruchson-Arbib also identified previously unknown letters of Jewish Ashkenazi (European) sages.

In her doctorate work, Baruchson-Arbib studied the private libraries of the north Italian Jews at the close of the Renaissance period. This study was later published in the book "Books and Readers", as well as in a French-translated edition with a preface written by Professor Jean-Pierre Rothschild. The book and the subsequent research publications provide numerous scientific innovations on the literary interest and printing culture of Jews at the time of the counter-reformation when Hebrew books were persecuted. The book is based on a collection of manuscripts, altogether amounting to 628 pages that include 438 book inventories, which were located in the homes of 430 Jews and 8 synagogues of the Mantua Duchy, and which were presented to the censor, upon his request, for examination in 1595. The entire list of books is written in different handwriting, and part of the lists mention the name of the owner of the particular library and sometimes his profession. Altogether, the collection included 21,142 volumes, divided into 1234 titles in Hebrew, Yiddish, Italian, and Latin. The research by Baruchson-Arbib was based on deciphering and analyzing the entire dataset, in addition to researching the tax records of the community in an attempt to understand the influence of the socioeconomic background on the content of the libraries. The censors who were appointed to examine and expurgate the books [including deleting 'forbidden' parts, such as the words "Goy" (gentile, non-Jew), idolater, etc.] were three apostates, headed by Domenico Gerosolimitano. The censors, who were highly paid by the Jewish community, visited the Jewish homes, deleted the 'forbidden' parts in red ink (which, to this day, allows reading the text underneath the ink), and signed their names on the last page of the books to affirm that the books do not contain anti-Christian paragraphs. Thus, Baruchson-Arbib concluded that all were satisfied with the arrangement; the church, which censored the books, the Jews, whose books were not burned (thus allowing them to study and pray), and Duke of Mantua, who continued to receive taxes from the Jews. Years later, Domenico Gerosolimitano wrote the "Index Librorum Prohibitorum" (Sefer ha-Zikkuk) – a guide to the forbidden parts in the books of Jews. The life and work of Domenico Gerosolimitano, who was originally a Rabbi in Israel, were studied extensively by a doctorate student of Baruchson-Arbib, Dr. Gila Prebor.

The research of Baruchson-Arbib opened, for the first time, a gateway to analyzing private libraries from a time when the cost of purchasing a book was very high. This is true mostly for the great Bibles and Pesika ('religious rulings') books, which were extremely costly at the time. For instance, the price of the Mikraot Gedolot book (that includes commentaries on the Bible) was equivalent to a month and a half worth of work; the price of the Talmud was equivalent to three and a half months of work; and the price of the Siddur (prayer book) was equivalent to a day's work. Under these conditions, it is no wonder that the typical library in most communities comprised between 26 and 50 books, whereas wealthy families held libraries of between 101 and 350 books. Baruchson-Arbib found that the most prominent books in the libraries were prayer books, Bibles, Pirkei Avot (Ethics), Mishneh Torah by Maimonides, and the Mishnah (the oral ruling). In this society, the Zohar book (the Jewish book of Kabbalah and mysticism) was prevalent in approximately 10.5% of the libraries, and the philosophical book of Maimonides, Moreh Nevukhim, was prevalent in approximately 9.5% of the libraries, which indicates an intellectual interest in the study of the occult and in philosophy. In addition, the libraries of the Mantuan Jews contained copies of books in Latin and Italian, written by the great writers of the Greek and Roman cultures, of the Middle Ages, and of the Renaissance (including writings of Virgil, Cicero, Dante, Boccaccio, and others). Nevertheless, Baruchson-Arbib found that the most popular non-Jewish writings were Orlando Furioso by Ludovico Ariosto and the collection of love sonatas by Petrarch.

Baruchson-Arbib found that, in the Mantuan community, the reading culture also reflected class differences. The wealthier Jews, such as Jewish doctors and Rabbis, owned the largest libraries, while the libraries of the tailor, the hatter, and the servant comprised only a few books. The study shed light also on the fact that the interest of the Jewish community in books was greater than that of the surrounding society. The study also delved into research on publishing houses, book prices, means of book distribution, and the ambivalent relationships between the Jews, the church, and the local ruler. Some of the volumes of the Jews of Mantua are today stored in the Israeli National Library and in Bar-Ilan University's library. In addition to many new data revealed in the book, the study stands out due to its methodology, which integrates many disciplines, such as history, statistics, sociology, and bibliography. Thus, the study of Baruchson-Arbib is part of the modern trend of the study of history, and it implements the French school of "Livre et Societe" into the study of Judaism. This field of research, also called "the new bibliology", is discussed in other publications by Baruchson-Arbib. As a byproduct of studying the Mantuan libraries, 202 unknown published Hebrew books were found. Quantitatively, this is one of the most comprehensive data found in this field of Hebrew bibliography. Baruchson-Arbib has continued studying Hebrew books, together with her doctorate student, Dr. Esther Lapon-Kandelshein, in the fields of 16th century "science books" and the publication of "Ladino literature" in Israel

=== Information science ===
Baruchson-Arbib began her research in the field of Information Science in the early 1990s, when she published her book "Social Information Science: Love, Health and the Information Society" (1996). In this book, Baruchson-Arbib predicted the benefits, problems, and challenges of the digital world, and set out a way of intelligently using digital and printed information for the benefit of society. The novel discipline developed by Baruchson-Arbib was termed "Social Information science" – a new field of research that studies the development and implementation of the various aspects related to the transfer and sharing of social and medical information. These aspects include locating and processing information, researching the needs of the society, the ethics of sharing information, and the development of computerized tools for providing social information. In addition, the field includes the development of relevant institutions and professions, such as information banks (data centers) for social and medical information that will be managed by a social information scientist, sections for self-help in libraries, and private information services, information websites, and social portals. While developing this field of research, Baruchson-Arbib has relied on several hypotheses:

1. A person needs reliable, available, and rapid information for welfare purposes, for medical issues, and for support in life-changing situations.
2. The required relevant information in these areas is divided into two parts. The first part is "direct information", i.e., information regarding organizations, means of coping within the bureaucratic institutions, and locating specialists who can assist in special situations (doctors social workers, etc.). The second part is "indirect information", namely, support information that can instill hope and help in coping and in managing one's life. This information is found in literature, poetry, films, and daily newspapers. Baruchson-Arbib perceives such literature as information that can assist a person and provide a relevant example and model for the wellbeing and life management of an individual.
3. There is a need for specialist "social information scientists", because there are parts of society that lack a high degree of information literacy. A social information scientist will help the information consumer to evaluate the required information and to locate reliable information in various languages by using appropriate keywords and by being proficient in the various visible and hidden information channels, including expensive databases.
4. The role of the "social information scientist" is to retrieve reliable information and to outline a roadmap of "direct and supporting information" to a person in need.

Baruchson-Arbib describes her vision and the ideal for the field of social information:

In order to have a large group of informed and skilled people in our society, and for humans to understand what is the power of information and the great potential that it has in assisting our lives, a new generation must be educated, .A generation that will learn, in schools, the new profession of information skills, and will be provided with information tools for social needs…"Social information science", at this stage, is the beginning of a vision to enlarge educated smart users and diminish "digital divide "; the materialization depends on the integration of currently available" information technologies" in a creative and responsible way by knowledgeable specialists, such as the "social information scientist" and a group of people proficient in information literacy.

According to Baruchson-Arbib, the "social information" approach can greatly influence the role of public and school libraries in the community. The librarian/information scientist can serve as a "social information scientist", constructing sections for "self-help" in libraries, directing readers toward relevant and accurate sources, and turning the library into a center of information and culture. Due to the seminars given by Baruchson-Arbib in the field of "social information", some of her students have begun to practice the social aspects of information; some of them have established self-counseling and assistance sections in public libraries, and even initiated a project of "a Reading School" in school libraries. In addition, due to her research in the field of social information, Baruchson-Arbib was asked to edit two volumes in the field for the "Journal of Information Communication and Ethics in Society" Baruchson-Arbib has continued her research in the relationship between society and modern information tools in a series of studies. These studies touch upon various aspects of the field, including social information in a multicultural society, assistance and support through books, the relationship between hospital libraries and public libraries, the information website of the public library, community information and the public library, evaluation of medical website, and a series of papers regarding SHIL (the Israeli citizen advice bureau), which she published together with a group of researchers and which was funded by the Israel Science Foundation. Alongside these social issues, Baruchson-Arbib has published studies regarding various aspects in the field of information science, some of which were conducted together with her students. For instance, she has published papers on the future of the printed book in the information society, information behavior of researchers in the field of Jewish studies and of university students, teaching information skills, community information and the public library, plagiarism in the information society, information behavior of start-up entrepreneurs, public library management in an era of changes, and the future of the information science profession (a Delphi research). In recent years, Baruchson-Arbib is engaged in research on information in multicultural societies, information ethics, and smart information usage.

== Books ==
- Books and Readers: The reading culture of Italian Jews at the Close of the Renaissance, Ramat-Gan: Bar-Ilan University, 1993. (Hebrew)
- Social Information Science: Love, Health and the Information Society - The Challenge of the 21st Century, Brighton: Sussex Academic Press, 1996.
- La culture livresque des Juifs d'Italie a la Fin de la Renaissance, Paris: CNRS - Institut de Recherche et D'Histoire des Textes, 2001

== Selected publications ==
- Baruchson-Arbib, S. Nuova bibliologia e storia del libro ebraico, Annuario di Studi Ebraici,10, (1984) pp. 17–28.
- Baruchson-Arbib, S. Money and culture - Financing Sources and Methods in the Hebrew Printing Shops in Cinquecento Italy, La Bibliofilia - Revista di storia del libro e di bibliografia, 92, (1990) pp. 23–39.
- Baruchson-Arbib, S. Hilf durch Bucher in medizinischen und sozialen einrichtungen, Israel. Gedenkschrift, Dr. Med. Edith Mundt- Kranke Kinder brauchen Bücher. Bibliotherapie in Theorie und Praxis: Gedenkschrift Dr. med. Edith Mundt. Munchen, Deutschen Arztinnenbundes, (1996) pp. 137–144.
- Baruchson-Arbib, S. The 'Self-Help Section' in Public Libraries - The Case of Israel, Public Library Quarterly, 16, (1996) pp. 41–49.
- Baruchson-Arbib, S. Information and Supportive Literature in "Aid Organizations": The Case of Israel, Libri, 46, (1996) pp. 168–172.
- Baruchson-Arbib, S. The Public library and the problem of hospital Libraries for patients, Public Library Quarterly, 17, (1999) pp. 79–88.
- Baruchson-Arbib, S. Books and Bread – Food for the Soul and food for the Body: The Future of the Printed book in the Information Society, La Bibliofilia, Revista di storia del libro e di bibliografia 102, (2000) pp. 299–308.
- Baruchson-Arbib, S. and Bronstein, J.A view to the future of the library and information science profession: A Delphi study, Journal of the American Society for Information Science and Technology, 53(5), (2002) pp. 397 –408.
- Baruchson-Arbib, S. and Shor, F. The use of electronic information sources by Israeli college students, Journal of Academic Librarianship, 28(4), (2002) pp. 255–257.
- Rogerson, S., Baruchson-Arbib, S., Weckert, J., Dalgadno, B., Capurro, R., Murata, K. and Szejko. Opinions on the technologically dependent society, Journal of Information Communication and Ethics in Society, 2, (2004) pp. 15–21.
- Baruchson-Arbib, S. and Kvity, T. The publication of "self-help-books" in Israel, Public Library Quarterly, 23(2,) (2004) pp. 33–48.
- Baruchson-Arbib, S. and Yaari, E. Printed versus Internet plagiarism: A study of students' perception, International Journal of Information Ethics, 1, (2004) pp. 1–7.
- Baruchson-Arbib, S. 'Social information science' – as a concept for assimilating smart Internet usage in multi-cultural society: The case of Israel, International Journal of Information Ethics, 2, (2004) pp. 14–22.
- Baruchson-Arbib, S., Shoham, S. and Yaari, E. Community information needs of the urban population in Israel, Libri, 56 (2), (2006) pp. 83–96.
- Baruchson-Arbib, S., Shoham, S. and Guri, O. An exploratory study of start-up entrepreneurs usage of the Internet, Journal of Information Science, 32(1), (2006) pp. 49–62.
- Ravid, G., Bar-Ilan, J., Rafaeli, S. and Baruchson-Arbib, S. Analysis of queries reaching SHIL on the Web - An information system providing citizen information, Lecture Notes in Computer Science, 4032, (2006) pp. 26–37.
- Baruchson-Arbib, S. and Bronstein, J. Humanists as information users in the digital age: the case of Jewish studies scholars. Journal of the American society for information science and technology, 58(14), (2007) pp. 269–268
- Baruchson-Arbib S. & Horenstein V. An Experiment to Enhance Awareness of the Power of Information: The Social Information Science Concept and Individual Empowerment in Israeli High Schools, Journal of Information Communication and Ethics in Society, 5, 2/3 (2007) pp. 79–97
- Baruchson-Arbib S. Guest editorial: The Contribution of Information Science to the Social and Ethical Challenges of the Information Age, journal of Information Communication and Ethics in Society, volume 5, 2/3 (2007) pp. 53–58.
- Hetz, H., Baruchson-Arbib, S., Shalom, N. and Bronstein, J. Meidaat: Journal of information science and librarianship, 6, (2010) pp. 4–30(.Hebrew )
- Bar-Ilan, J., Baruchson-Arbib, S., Rafaeli, S., Ravid, G. and Yaari, E. Information needs of Israelis on citizen-related information: Results of a survey. Libri 61, (4),) 2011) pp. 298–308
- Finzi, S. Bronstein, J. Bar-Ilan, J., Baruchson-Arbib S., Rafaeli, S. and Ravid, G. Volunteers acting as information providers to citizens. ASLIB Proceedings, 64, (3) (2012), pp 289–303
- Ravid, G., Bar-Ilan, J., Baruchson-Arbib, S. Yaari, E., Aharony, N., Rafaeli, S. and Weiss, N. "I just wanted to ask?: A comparison of user studies of the Citizens Advice Bureau (SHIL) in Israel", Journal of Librarianship and Information Science, 46, (2014) pp. 21–31.

== Awards and Grants ==
=== Awards ===
1993 – The Zalman Shazar Award for Outstanding Research in Jewish History, for her book "Books and Readers: The Reading Culture of Italian Jews at the Close of the Renaissance", 1993.

=== Grants ===
- 2007 – 2010 – Public usage of online information: A study of usage of the SHIL (Israeli Citizen Advice Bureau) website.

Together with a group of researchers from Haifa University, Ben-Gurion University of the Negev, and Bar-Ilan University. Awarded by the Israel Science Foundation.

2008 – 2012 – Automatic methods for evaluating the quality of Wikipedia content. Together with a group of researchers from Bar-Ilan University. Awarded by the Israel Internet Association.
