= Micah Altman =

American social scientist (born 1967)

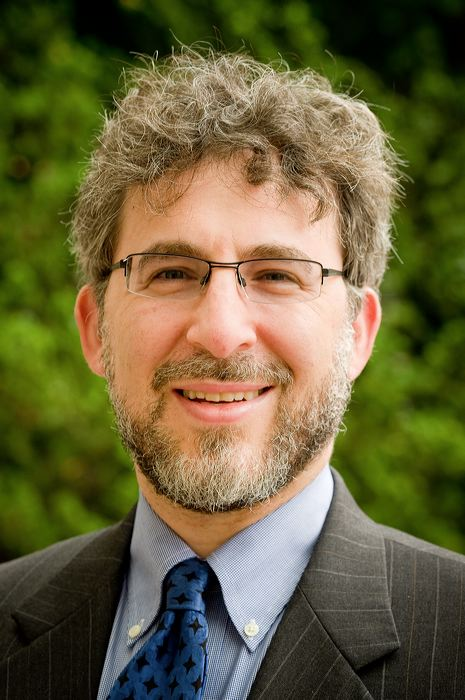
- Born: August 31, 1967 (age 58); St. Louis, Missouri, United States
- Education: Harvard University (Postdoctoral Fellow); California Institute of Technology (Ph.D.); Brown University (B.A.)
- Scientific career
- Fields: Social Science Informatics, Software Engineering, Social Science, Statistics, Political Philosophy
- Workplaces: Massachusetts Institute of Technology Libraries; Brookings Institution
- Thesis: Districting Principles and Democratic Representation (1998)
- Doctoral advisor: Joseph Morgan Kousser
- Website: micahaltman.com

Micah Altman (born August 31, 1967) is an American social scientist who conducts research in social science informatics. Since 2012, he has worked as the head research scientist in the MIT Libraries, first as director of the Program on Information Science (2012-2018) and subsequently as director of research for the libraries' Center for Research on Equitable and Open Scholarship. Altman previously worked at Harvard University. He is known for his work on redistricting, scholarly communication, privacy and open science. Altman is a co-founder of Public Mapping Project, which develops DistrictBuilder, an open-source software.

== Biography ==
Altman was born on August 31, 1967, in St. Louis, Missouri, United States. He studied computer science and political philosophy at Brown University, graduating in 1989. He then went to the California Institute of Technology where he studied social science under Morgan Kousser and received a Ph.D. in 1998. He worked as a postdoctoral researcher in Gary King's research group at Harvard University.

From 1998 to 2012 Altman held a number of research positions at Harvard University, including senior research scientist at the Institute of Quantitative Social Science, archival director for the Murray Research Archive and associate director of the Harvard-MIT Data Center. In 1998, Altman was awarded the "Leon Weaver Award" from the American Political Science Association. In 2004, together with Jeff Gill and Michael P. McDonald, he co-authored Numerical Issues in Statistical Computing for the Social Scientist, a book in the field of computational statistics that had several re-editions.

In January 2011, Altman and McDonald presented their Public Mapping Project, which developed DistrictBuilder, an open-source software redistricting application designed to provide online mapping tools. This was awarded Best policy innovations from Politico (2011), the Antonio Pizzigati Prize for Software in the Public Interest from the Tides (2013) and the Brown Democracy Medal from Pennsylvania State University (2018).

In March 2012, Altman was appointed as director of research at Massachusetts Institute of Technology Libraries and head scientist for the Program for Information Science, and a non-resident senior fellow at the Brookings Institution in Washington, DC. Also in 2012, he received "The Best Research Software Award" from the American Political Science Association.

== Research works ==
=== Electoral districting and redistricting ===
Altman's contributions to electoral districting and redistricting have been both theoretical and implementational. He established that the computational complexity of the districting problem is NP-hard and hence optimal redistricting is likely to be intractable.

The undesirable implications of this result are that redistricting cannot be fully automated in practice and the choice of constraints and manual selection of the winning, "optimal" plan from a group of auto-generated plans, reintroduce value-laden and politically biased decision making back into the redistricting process (something that the use of "objective" computer programs was hoped to avoid), while potentially also legitimizing such undercover gerrymandering for the less knowledgeable public.

Further, computational simulations that he performed showed also that even the constraints that have been traditionally considered politically non-preferential, such as the overall compactness of the district, are not necessarily non-preferential because compactness requirements have different effects on political groups if the groups are distributed in geographically different ways. This result was referenced by the Supreme Court justices in the Vieth v. Jubelirer case.

Altman and his colleagues later created the DistrictBuilder software (a successor to the BARD package), the first open-source system to enable the public to participate in redistricting directly through the creation of legal redistricting plans. This effort was awarded the Brown Democracy medal and Pizzigati award (see awards and recognition), after being used by the public to create thousands of legal districting plans—which increased previous levels of public participation in redistricting.

=== Scientific data curation, preservation and replication ===
Altman's research in data curation and replication began in a collaboration with the Harvard libraries and Harvard-MIT Data Center (which is now a part of the Institute of Quantitative Social Science). This work included development of an open source institutional repository for data, named the Virtual Data Center, co-led with Sidney Verba and Gary King. The successor to the Virtual data center, the Dataverse Network, remains in broad use for data preservation and scientific replication.

Altman co-authored Numerical Issues in Statistical Computing for the Social Scientist with Jefferson Gill, and Michael P. McDonald in 2004, which demonstrated that the reproducibility of statistical analyses used in social science are threatened by errors and limitations in the statistical computations and software used to estimate them. Based on this analysis, Altman, McDonald and Gill developed methods to detect issues in social science statistical models and provide more replicable and reliable estimates.

Altman's research was focused on preservation, scientific replication, and scholarly communication. It included the development of standards for data citation; the creation of semantic fingerprint methods to verify data for scientific reuse, and long-term archiving; the analysis of technical and institutional approach to long-term preservation; the creation of taxonomic standards for author attribution (working with Amy Brand and other); and the characterization of grand-challenge problems in scholarly communications.

=== Information privacy ===
Over the last decade, Altman has been a leader in the Harvard University Privacy Tools project, which conducts research and develops tools to improve data privacy. Altman has published several research articles with this group characterizing the mathematical underpinnings on information privacy threats, and developing new technical and legal approaches to privacy protection.

== Awards and recognitions ==
Year	Recognition	Recognition type	Awarding body
1998	Leon Weaver Award	Award	American Political Science Association
1999	Best Dissertation Award	Award	Western Political Science Association
2011	Best policy innovations	Award	Politico
2012	Best Research Software Award	Award	American Political Science Association
2012	Data Innovation Award for Social Impact	Award	O’Reilly Strata Conference
2013	The Antonio Pizzigati Prize for Software in the Public Interest	Award	Tides
2010-2016	Non-Resident Senior Fellow	Fellowship	Brookings Institution
2018	Brown Democracy Medal	Award	Pennsylvania State University

== Books ==
- Altman, Micah (1998). Districting Principles and Democratic Representation. Pasadena, California, United States: California Institute of Technology. p. 367.
- Altman, Micah; Gill, Jeff; Mcdonald, Michael (2003). Numerical Issues in Statistical Computing for the Social Scientist. John Wiley & Sons. ISBN 978-0-471-23633-7.
- Communicating Science and Engineering Data in the Information Age. National Academies Press. 2012. ISBN 978-0-309-22209-9.
- McDonald, Michael P.; Altman, Micah (2018). The Public Mapping Project: How Public Participation Can Revolutionize Redistricting. Cornell University Press. ISBN 978-1-5017-3855-5.

== Selected publications ==
- Altman, Micah (1997). "Is Automation the Answer: The Computational Complexity of Automated Redistricting". Rutgers Computer and Technology Law Journal (23): 81–142.
- Micah Altman (November 1998). "Modeling the Effect of Mandatory District Compactness on Partisan Gerrymanders". Political Geography. 17 (8): 989–1012. doi:10.1016/S0962-6298(98)00015-8.
- Micah Altman; Gary King (March 2007). "A Proposed Standard for the Scholarly Citation of Quantitative Data". D-Lib Magazine. 13 (3/4): 1082–9873. ISSN 1082-9873.
- Liz Allen; Jo Scott; Amy Brand; Marjorie Hlava; Micah Altman (April 16, 2014). "Publishing: Credit where credit is due". Nature. 508 (7496): 312–313. Bibcode:2014Natur.508..312A. doi:10.1038/508312a. PMID 24745070. S2CID 26592448.
- Altman, M.; Bailey, J.; Cariani, K.; Corridan, J.; Crabtree, J.; Gallinger, M.; Goethals, A.; Grotke, A.; Hartman, C.; Lazorshak, B. (2015). "2015 National agenda for digital stewardship" (PDF). National Digital Stewardship Alliance. Archived from the original (PDF) on 2019-10-15.
- Micah Altman; Alexandra Wood; David R. O’Brien; Salil Vadhan; Urs Gasser (2016). "Towards a Modern Approach to Privacy-Aware Government Data Releases". Berkeley Technology Law Journal. 30 (3): 1967–2072. doi:10.15779/Z38FG17.
- Altman, M.; Bourg, C.; Cohen, P.; Choudhury, GS; Henry, C.; Kriegsman, S.; Minow, M.; Selematsela, D.; Sengupta, A.; Suber, P.; Turnator, E. (2018-12-17). "A Grand Challenges-Based Research Agenda for Scholarly Communication and Information Science". Mit Grand Challenge Participation Platform. MIT Grand Challenges Summit. doi:10.21428/62b3421f. S2CID 158123137. Archived from the original on 2019-05-05 – via PubPub.
