= Bernard Tamas =

American political scientist

Bernard Tamas is an American professor of political science at Valdosta State University. He was formerly a visiting Research Scholar at Columbia University and has taught at Illinois State University, Williams College, and Brandeis University. He was a Fulbright scholar to the Central European University in Budapest, Hungary, and a Postdoctoral Fellow at the Harvard-MIT Data Center.

Tamas received grants from the MIT Election Data and Science Lab and the Centennial Center Research Grants program of the American Political Science Association for his project on voter suppression and electoral bias. Findings from this project were published in The Conversation. His opinions on third parties in the United States politics are published in academic journals and media outlets including NPR, Associated Press, C-SPAN, ABC, CBS News, and The Hill.

== Early life ==
Tamas is of Hungarian descent. His postdoctoral research was at Harvard University.

== Selected works ==
- The Demise and Rebirth of American Third Parties: Poised for Political Revival? (2018) Routledge.
- From Dissident to Party Politics: The Struggle For Democracy in Post-Communist Hungary, 1989-1994 (2008) Columbia University Press (East European Monographs).
