= Journal of Library Administration =

- Discipline: Library science
- Language: English
- Edited by: Gary M. Pitkin

Publication details
- History: 1980–present
- Publisher: Routledge
- Frequency: 8/year
- Open access: Hybrid

Standard abbreviations
- ISO 4: J. Libr. Adm.

Indexing
- CODEN: JLADEL
- ISSN: 0193-0826 (print); 1540-3564 (web)
- LCCN: 80644826
- OCLC no.: 422111306

Links
- Journal homepage; Online access; Online archive

The Journal of Library Administration is a peer-reviewed academic journal that covers library management. Established in 1980, the journal is published 8 times a year by Routledge. The editor-in-chief is Gary M. Pitkin, from the University of Northern Colorado.

== Controversy ==
In March 2013, the editor-in-chief, Damon Jaggars (Columbia University), along with the entire editorial board, resigned in protest of the limited authors' rights offered by the publisher under its copyright licensing terms. The board had been negotiating with the publisher for authors' right to publish under an open access model. However, the best offer made for publishing under a Creative Commons license involved a nearly $3,000 fee per article, which was unacceptable by Jaggars and the board. Board member Chris Bourg later wrote of a "crisis of conscience about publishing in a journal that was not open access" especially in light of the suicide of open access activist Aaron Swartz.

== Abstracting and indexing ==
The journal is abstracted and indexed in CSA databases, EBSCOhost, Education Resources Information Center, Inspec, and ProQuest.
