= Revue des Études Juives =

Revue des études juives
- Discipline: Jewish studies
- Language: French
- Edited by: Jean Pierre Rothschild, José Costa, Peter Nahon

Publication details
- History: 1880–present
- Publisher: Peeters Publishers (France)
- Frequency: Quarterly

Standard abbreviations
- ISO 4: Rev. Études Juives

Indexing
- ISSN: 0484-8616 (print); 1783-175X (web)

Links
- Journal homepage

Revue des études juives is a French quarterly academic journal of Jewish studies, established in July 1880 at the École pratique des hautes études, Paris by the Société des Études Juives. The founding editor was Isidore Loeb; after his death it was edited by Israel Lévi. The Revue des Études Juives has currently two Chief Editors, Jean-Pierre Rothschild and José Costa, whereas its Managing Editor is Peter Nahon. It is currently published by Peeters Publishers. The journal covers research and prints unpublished texts concerning Judaism, among others documents relative to the history of the French Jews. Nearly every issue also contains a special bibliographical section devoted to reviews of current works on Judaism. It is one of the oldest active scientific periodicals in the field of Jewish studies (the Jewish Quarterly Review having been founded, for instance, in 1889).

== Abstracting and indexing ==
The journal is abstracted and indexed in:

- Arts and Humanities Citation Index
- Current Contents/Arts & Humanities
- International Bibliography of Periodical Literature
- Bibliographie linguistique/Linguistic Bibliography
- ATLA Religion Database
- New Testament Abstracts
- Index Islamicus
- Scopus
