= Jean Pierre Rothschild =

French philologist and Medievalist

Jean Pierre Rothschild (born in Paris, 1956) is Director Emeritus of Studies in Historical and Philological Sciences at École Pratique des Hautes Études (EPHE) and Director Emeritus of Research at the Institute for Research and History of Texts (IRHT) at the French National Center for Scientific Research (CNRS), specializing in Philology, History of Philosophy, Medieval Philosophy, and Latin and Hebrew studies and texts. He serves as co-editor and co-director of the French quarterly Revue des Études Juives (Review of Jewish Studies, established in the year 1880) and in 2023 was awarded the Prix Duchalais from Académie des Inscriptions et Belles-Lettres (AIBL, Academy of Inscriptions and Literature) for his editorial work on "La bibliothèque de l’abbaye de Clairvaux du XIIe au XVIIIe siècle, t. II. Manuscrits conservés. Troisième partie : Cotes O, P, Q".
