= Soultzmatt =

Commune in Grand Est, France

- Commune
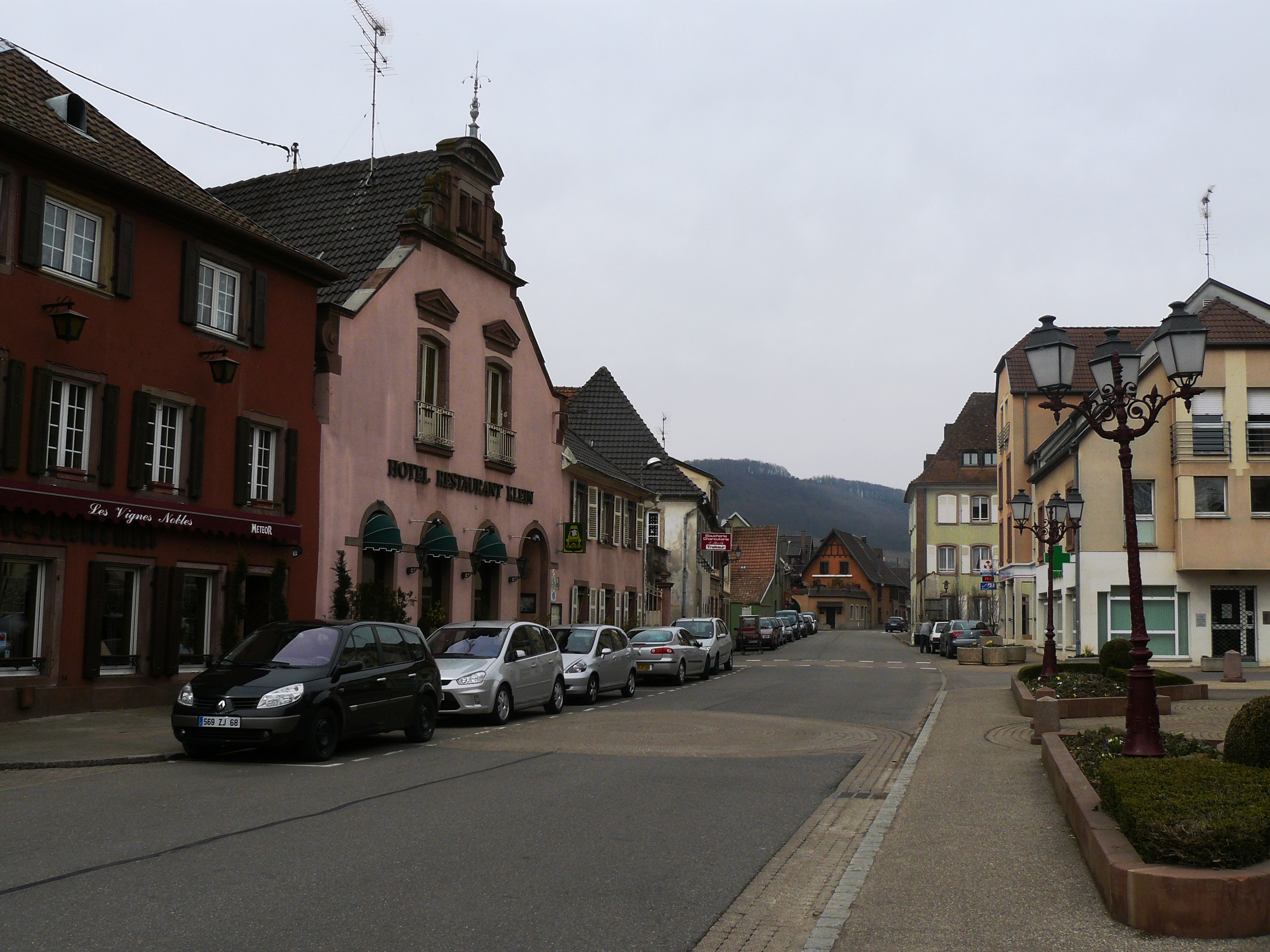
- The main road through Soultzmatt

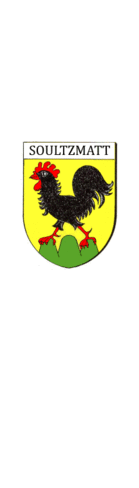
- Flag Coat of arms
- Location of Soultzmatt
- Location within France Location within Grand Est
- Coordinates: 47°57′45″N 7°14′20″E
- Country: France
- Region: Grand Est
- Department: Haut-Rhin
- Arrondissement: Thann-Guebwiller
- Canton: Wintzenheim
- Intercommunality: Région de Guebwiller

Government
  - Mayor (2020–2026): Jean-Paul Diringer
- Area^{1}: 19.57 km^{2} (7.56 sq mi)
- Elevation: 280 m (920 ft)
- Highest elevation: 773 m (2,536 ft)
- Lowest elevation: 236 m (774 ft)
- Population (2023): 2,487
  - Density: 127.1/km^{2} (329.1/sq mi)
- Time zone: UTC+01:00 (CET)
  - Summer (DST): UTC+02:00 (CEST)
- INSEE/Postal code: 68318 /68570
- ^{1} French Land Register data, which excludes lakes, ponds, glaciers > 1 km^{2} (0.386 sq mi or 247 acres) and river estuaries.

Soultzmatt (French pronunciation: [sultsmat]; German: Sulzmatt) is a commune in the Haut-Rhin department in Grand Est in north-eastern France.

Its vineyards produce one of the finest Alsacian wines: the Grand Cru Zinnkoepflé.

== Population ==
Historical population
Year	Pop.	±% p.a.
1968	2,057	—
1975	2,040	−0.12%
1982	1,924	−0.83%
1990	1,997	+0.47%
1999	2,138	+0.76%
2007	2,244	+0.61%
2012	2,346	+0.89%
2017	2,411	+0.55%
2023	2,487	+0.52%
Source: INSEE

== See also ==
- Communes of the Haut-Rhin department
