= Massachusetts Institute of Technology academics =

Academics at the Massachusetts Institute of Technology are organized into 6 divisions containing 32 academic departments or faculties along with many interdisciplinary, affiliated, and intercollegiate research and degree programs. The Schools of Engineering, Science, Sloan School of Management, Humanities, Arts, and Social Sciences, Architecture and Urban Planning, and the Whitaker College of Health Sciences and Technology.

== School of Science ==
The School of Science is composed of 6 academic departments and grants S.B., S.M., and Ph.D. or Sc.D degrees. The current dean of engineering is Professor Marc A. Kastner. With approximately 300 faculty members, 1200 graduate students, 1000 undergraduate majors, the school is the second largest at MIT. 16 faculty members and 16 alumni of the school have won Nobel Prizes.

=== Biology ===
The Department of Biology (Course VII) began as a department of natural history in 1871.

=== Brain and Cognitive Sciences ===
The Department of Brain and Cognitive Sciences (Course IX) began as the Department of Psychology in 1964.

=== Chemistry ===
The Department of Chemistry (Course V) was one of the original departments when MIT opened in 1865.

=== Earth, Atmospheric, and Planetary Sciences ===
The Department of Earth, Atmospheric and Planetary Sciences (Course XII or EAPS) traces its origins to the establishment of MIT by the eminent geologist William Barton Rogers in 1861. Before distinguishing himself as the University's founder and first president, Rogers was a professor of natural philosophy and chemistry. He also served as State Geologist of Virginia, which explains why geology courses have been taught at MIT for more than a century.

In 1983, EAPS was formed through the merger of two MIT departments: the Department of Earth and Planetary Sciences, which grew out of the first geology courses, and the Department of Meteorology and Physical Oceanography, which had its roots in the meteorology courses that first emerged at MIT in 1941.

Today, the department seeks to understand the fundamental workings of natural systems by examining physical, chemical, and biological processes occurring across a vast spectrum of time and space. Their highly integrated research requires direct observation as well as modeling, and the department thrives on interdisciplinary ventures that open new avenues of exploration.

=== Mathematics ===
The Department of Mathematics (Course XVIII)

=== Physics ===
The Department of Physics (Course VIII)

== School of Engineering ==
The MIT School of Engineering is one of the five schools of the Massachusetts Institute of Technology, located in Cambridge, Massachusetts, United States. Generally considered having one of the best engineering programs in the world , the school has 8 academic departments and 1 interdisciplinary division and grants S.B., M.Eng., S.M., an engineer's degree, and Ph.D. or Sc.D degrees. The current dean of engineering is Professor Anantha P. Chandrakasan. The school is the largest at MIT as measured by undergraduate and graduate enrollments and faculty members.

=== Aeronautics and Astronautics ===
The Department of Aeronautics and Astronautics (Course XVI) was founded as a program within the Mechanical Engineering department in 1926 and became an independent department in 1939.

=== Biological Engineering ===
The Department of Biological Engineering (Course XX) was founded as a division in 1998 and became an independent department in 2005.

=== Chemical Engineering ===
The Department of Chemical Engineering (Course X) was founded as a combined course of mechanical engineering and industrial chemistry in 1888 and became an independent department in 1920.

=== Civil and Environmental Engineering ===
The Department of Civil and Environmental Engineering (Course I) offered classes in civil engineering since MIT's 1865 opening and was subject to repeated mergers with the departments of sanitary engineering and structural engineering before adopting its current name and organization in 1992.

=== Electrical Engineering and Computer Science ===
The Department of Electrical Engineering and Computer Science (Course VI) is the largest department in the School of Engineering. Electrical engineering was originally taught within the Department of Physics, but a new degree program was offered in 1882, and the department became independent in 1902.

=== Engineering Systems Division ===
The Engineering Systems Division was an interdisciplinary division within the School of Engineering, but was superseded by IDSS.

=== Materials Science and Engineering ===
The Department of Materials Science and Engineering (Course III) can be traced back to a Department of Geology and Mining established at MIT's 1865 opening which later grew to encompass mining and metallurgy until the modern name was adopted in 1974.

=== Mechanical Engineering ===
The Department of Mechanical Engineering (Course II) was one of the original MIT departments. In 2004, the department adsorbed the Department of Ocean Engineering (Course XIII) which is now the Center for Ocean Engineering.

=== Nuclear Science and Engineering ===
The Department of Nuclear Science and Engineering (Course XXII) was established in 1958, making it one of the oldest programs of its kind in the nation.

== School of Humanities, Arts, and Social Sciences ==
The School of Humanities, Arts, and Social Sciences (MIT SHASS) has 13 departments, department-level programs, and faculties granting S.B., S.M., and Ph.D. degrees. The current dean is professor of political science Melissa Nobles. The school teaches every MIT undergraduate — a total of about 4,500 students, each of whom takes a minimum of 8 humanities, arts, and social sciences classes, nearly 25% of their total class time. With approximately 180 faculty members, 337 graduate students, 130 undergraduate majors, 161 undergraduate minors, the school is the fourth largest at MIT. 3 Nobel Laureates, 8 MacArthur Fellows, and 5 Pulitzer Prize winners are on the faculty.

=== Anthropology ===
The Anthropology program

=== Comparative Media Studies / Writing ===
The Comparative Media Studies and Writing program

=== Economics ===
The Department of Economics

=== Global Studies and Languages ===
The Global Studies and Languages program

=== History ===
The History faculty

=== Linguistics ===
The Department of Linguistics

=== Literature ===
The Literature faculty

=== Music ===
The Music program

=== Philosophy ===
The Department of Philosophy

=== Political Science ===
The Department of Political Science

=== Science, Technology, and Society ===
The Program in Science, Technology, and Society

=== Theater Arts ===
The Theatre Arts program

=== Women's Studies ===
The Women's and Gender Studies program

== School of Architecture and Planning ==
The School of Architecture and Planning consists of 2 departments and grants S.B., S.M., and Ph.D. degrees. The current dean of architecture and planning is Professor Adèle Naudé Santos.

=== Architecture ===
The Department of Architecture

=== Urban Studies and Planning ===
The Department of Urban Studies and Planning (DUSP)

Founded in 1933, DUSP has four specialization areas: City Design and Development; Environmental Policy; Housing, Community and Economic Development; and the International Development Group. There are also three cross-cutting areas of study: Transportation Planning and Policy, Urban Information Systems (UIS) and Regional Planning.

DUSP offers a two-year Master in City Planning (MCP) degree and a PhD in Urban and Regional Studies or Urban and Regional Planning. Under special circumstances, admission may be granted to candidates seeking a one-year Master of Science (SM) degree. DUSP also offer a Bachelor of Science (SB) in Planning, a five-year SB/MCP, and minors in Public Policy and in Urban Studies and Planning.

=== Media Laboratory ===
The Media Laboratory

== Sloan School of Management ==
The Sloan School of Management has one department (Management) and grants the S.B., S.M., and Ph.D.

== Whitaker College of Health Sciences and Technology ==
The Whitaker College of Health Sciences and Technology grants several degrees.
