= Harvard-MIT Data Center =

The Harvard-MIT Data Center (HMDC) provides multi-disciplinary information technology support for social science research and education at Harvard and MIT. Established in the early 1960s the HMDC was meant to be the original data center for political and social science at Harvard University, and over time it has evolved into an information technology service provider that transcends many educational fields.

== Services ==
The HMDC offers the following services:

- Powerful, usable research computing tools
- Cluster computing power
- Application and server hosting
- On-site computer labs
- Statistical workshops and classes
- User friendly desktop support

== History ==
In the early 1960s the HMDC, originally known as the Government Data Center, was established as part of a national movement for all universities to collect, consolidate, and share social science research data. This movement eventually became known as the Interuniversity Consortium for Political and Social Research (ICPSR), the largest collection of social science data in the world. In the early days associates of the Government Data Center were responsible for managing the distribution of ICPSR tapes housed in Harvard's Office of Information Technology.

In 1987 all holdings within the facility were transferred to the Faculty of Arts and Sciences Department of Government (located in Harvard's Littauer building) and in recognition of the widespread use of the facility's data by Harvard scholars the name was changed to the Harvard Data Center. At this time some of the earliest local computer networks, which contained statistical software and computing resources, were established; in addition, associates began transitioning the facility's holdings from tape to more modern media. In the early 1990s associates of the Harvard Data Center played a major role in a National Science Foundation (NSF) grant that established a research training program in political economy for various educational institutions.

Later on, in 1996, facility associates entered into an agreement with MIT to extend services to MIT users, thus changing the name to the Harvard-MIT Data Center (HMDC). In 1999 HMDC associates were awarded a multimillion-dollar grant by the NSF and five other funding agencies to create an open-source, digital library for quantitative research data; associates of the facility continue to receive additional grants and funding support from vendors, such as the NSF and the Library of Congress, to continue their research and development projects.

In 2005, after the facility was transferred into Harvard's new Center for Government and International Studies complex, the HMDC became a founding member of the Institute for Quantitative Social Science (IQSS), and in 2007 HMDC associates launched their new online data center, the Dataverse Network repository. Today, the HMDC continues to serve the social science community by providing technology support for research, education, and administration.
