= Massachusetts Institute of Technology Libraries =

The Massachusetts Institute of Technology Libraries
- 42.3590°N 71.0891°W
- Location: Cambridge, MA
- Type: Academic library system of the Massachusetts Institute of Technology (MIT)
- Established: 1862
- Branches: 1

Collection
- Items collected: more than 3 million printed volumes and 3 million items in other format.
- Size: more than 6 million (2020)

Other information
- Website: libraries.mit.edu

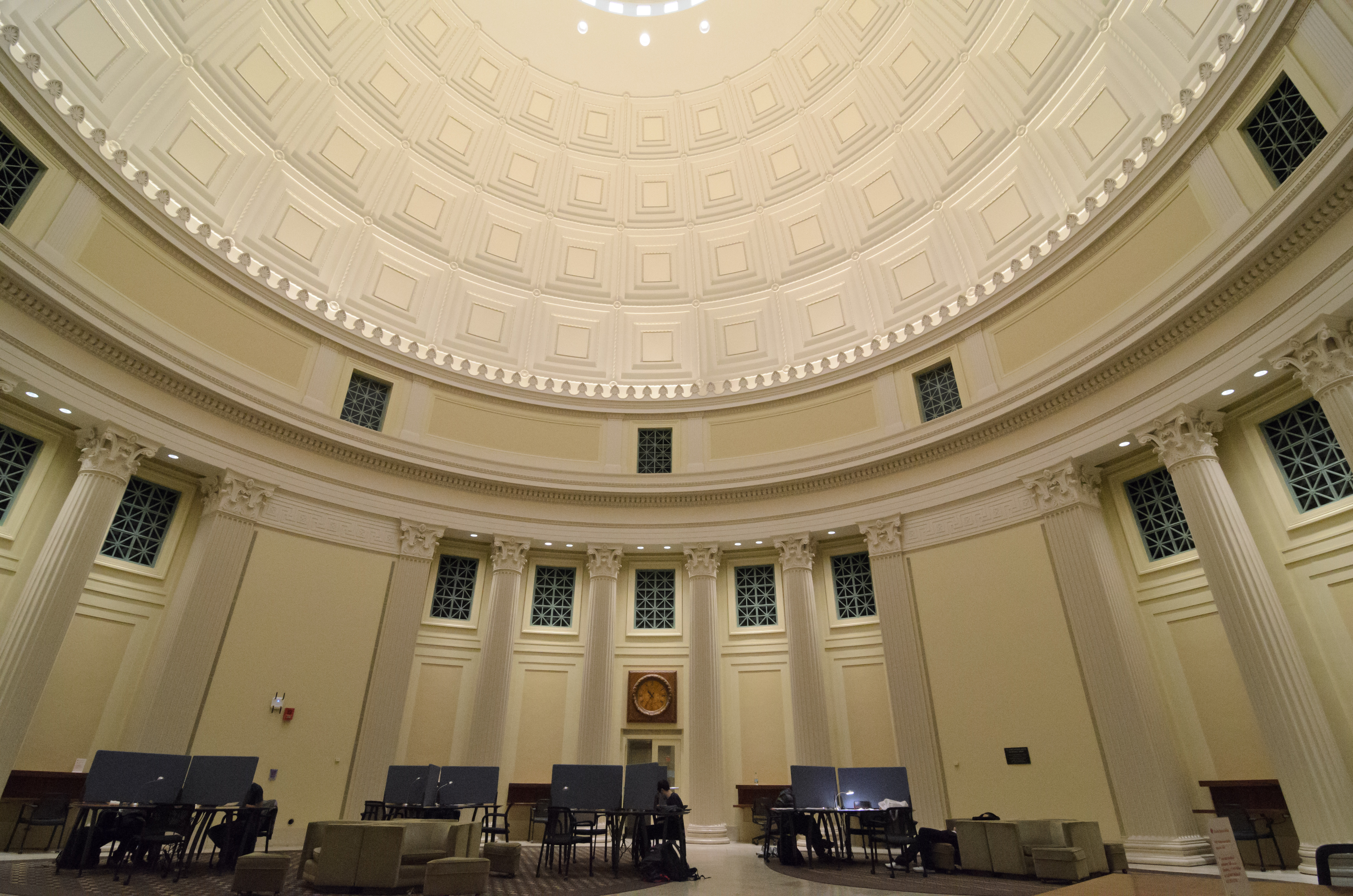
MIT Barker Engineering Library

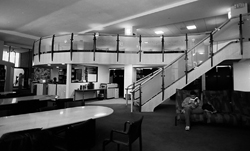
MIT Music Library

The library system of the Massachusetts Institute of Technology (MIT Libraries) covers all five academic schools comprising the university. The print and multimedia collections of the MIT Libraries include more than 5 million items, with over 3 million volumes of print material, 17,000 journal and other serial subscriptions, 478 online databases, over 55,000 electronic journal titles licensed for access, and over 2.8 million items in collections of microforms, maps, images, musical scores, sound recordings, and videotapes.

The MIT library was established in 1862 with a gift of seven volumes, three years before classes began. The MIT Libraries are two divisional libraries: Hayden (Science and Humanities)and Rotch (architecture and planning). The divisional libraries are open seven days a week and offer hours that extend well into the evening. Hayden, Barker, and Rotch Libraries feature 24/7 study rooms to accommodate MIT students around the clock.

In addition to the divisional libraries, there are a few smaller libraries that serve specialized fields: the Lewis Music Library, the GIS & Data Lab, the Aga Khan Documentation Center, Visual Collections, and the Physics Reading Room. The Lewis Music Library houses the MIT Music Oral History Project. The Department of Distinctive Collections (previously the Institute Archives and Special Collections) contains materials documenting MIT’s history, and the Library Storage Annex, located off-campus, houses materials that can be requested and available for use the next business day.

The Libraries also manage DSpace, a digital repository created to capture, preserve, and share MIT's intellectual output with the world. DSpace at MIT currently houses over 21,000 MIT theses.

== Publications ==
- Bibliotech: MIT Libraries' Newsletter (semi-annual; past issues)
- MIT Libraries News
- What's the Score? Newsletter of the MIT Music Library
