= Outline of information science =

Academic field concerned with collection and analysis of information

The following outline is provided as an overview of and topical guide to information science:

Information science – interdisciplinary field primarily concerned with the analysis, collection, classification, manipulation, storage, retrieval and dissemination of information. Practitioners within the field study the application and usage of knowledge in organizations, along with the interaction between people, organizations and any existing information systems, with the aim of creating, replacing, improving or understanding information systems.

== What type of thing is information science? ==
Information science can be described as all of the following:

- An academic discipline –
- A branch of science –
  - An applied science –
  - An action research –

== Sub-disciplines of information science ==
- Bibliometrics
- Categorization
- Censorship
- Classification
- Computer storage
- Cultural studies
- Data modeling
- Information technology
- Informatics
- Intellectual freedom
- Information policy
- Intellectual property
- Memory
- Preservation
- Privacy

=== Contributing fields ===
As an interdisciplinary field, information science draws upon and incorporates concepts and methodologies from:

- Archival science
- Cognitive science
- Commerce
- Communications
- Computer science
- Law
- Library science
- Museology
- Management
- Mathematics
- Philosophy
- Public policy
- Social sciences

== History of information science ==
- History of information science
- Documentation science – predecessor of information science.
- Fathers of information science
  - Vannevar Bush
  - Henri La Fontaine
  - Paul Otlet
  - Claude Shannon
  - Jesse Shera
- Information history
- International Federation for Information and Documentation
- History of information representation and retrieval
  - Has undergone four phases of development
    1. Increased Demand (1940s–early 1950s) (Information explosion)
    2. Rapid Growth (1950s–1980s) (the emergence of computers and systems such as Dialog (online database))
    3. Demystification Phase (1980s–1990s) (systems developed for end-user searching)
    4. The Networked Era (1990s–Present) (search engines such as AltaVista and Google)

== Research methods of information science ==
- Archival research – facts or factual evidences from a variety of records are compiled.
- Computational complexity and structure – algorithmic and graphic methods are used to explore the complexity of information systems, retrieval and storage.
- Content analysis – studies how people communicate by analyzing the contents of books and mass media as well as the messages people talk or write about.
- Case study – specific set of circumstances or a group (the 'case') is analyzed according to a specific goal of study. Generally, case studies are used to characterize a trend or development; they have weak generalizability.
- Discourse analysis – analyzing written, oral, and sign language use
- Historical method – involves a continuous and systematic search for the information and knowledge about past events related to the life of a person, a group, society, or the world.
- Interviews – researchers obtain data by interviewing people. If the interview is non-structured, the researcher leaves it to the interviewee (also referred to as the respondent or the informant) to guide the conversation.
- Life history – study of the personal life of a person. Through a series of interviews, the researcher can probe into the decisive moments in their life or the various influences on their life.
- Longitudinal study – extensive examination of a specific group over a long period of time.
- Observation – using data from the senses, one records information about a social phenomenon or behavior. Qualitative research relies heavily on observation, although it is in a highly disciplined form.
- Participant observation – involves researchers going into the field (usually a community), living with the people for some time, and participating in their activities in order to know and feel their culture.

== General information science concepts ==
- Academic publishing (including peer review and open access)
- Bibliometrics
- Data modeling
- Document management and Document Engineering
- Groupware
- Human-computer interaction (HCI)
- Information access
- Information architecture
- Information ethics
- Information literacy
- Information management
- Information retrieval (IR)
- Information seeking
  - Information seeking behavior
    - Browsing
- Information society
- Information systems
- Intellectual property (IP)
- Knowledge engineering
- Knowledge management
  - Knowledge transfer
- Knowledge organization
- Memory institutions
- Ontology
- Personal information management (PIM)
- Philosophy of information
- Scholarly communication
- Scientific communication
- Science and technology studies
- Semantic Web
- Steganography
- Usability engineering
  - Human factors
- User-centered design
  - Design philosophy

== Related disciplines ==
There are many fields which claim to be "sciences" or "disciplines" which are difficult to distinguish from each other and from information science. Some of them are:

- Archival science
- Communication studies
- Computer science
- Documentation science
- Informatics
- Information management
- Information systems research
- Information literacy
- Internet studies
- Knowledge management
- Library science
- Media studies
- Records management
- Scientometrics

== Information science organizations ==
- American Society for Information Science and Technology
- Association of Information Technology Professionals (AITP)
- Society of Information Technology Management (SOCITM), related group based in the UK

=== Related governmental agencies ===
- National Commission on Libraries and Information Science (NCLIS)
- Institute of Museum and Library Services (IMLS)

=== Educational institutions ===
- Information school
  - List of Information Schools

== Information science awards ==
- Claude E. Shannon Award
- IEEE Reynold B. Johnson Information Storage Systems Award
- IEEE Richard W. Hamming Medal
- J.W. Graham Medal
- O'Moore Medal

== Information science publications ==
=== Information science journals ===
- African Journal of Library, Archives and Information Science
- Canadian Journal of Information and Library Science
- Information Research
- Information Sciences (journal)
- Information, Communication & Society
- International Journal of Geographical Information Science
- Journal of Information Science
- Journal of Librarianship and Information Science
- Journal of the Association for Information Science and Technology
- TripleC

== Persons influential in information science ==
- Tim Berners-Lee
- John Shaw Billings
- George Boole
- Suzanne Briet
- Michael Buckland
- Vannevar Bush
- Melvil Dewey
- Luciano Floridi
- Henri La Fontaine
- Eugene Garfield
- Frederick Kilgour
- Frederick Wilfrid Lancaster
- Gottfried Leibniz
- Alexander Ivanovich Mikhailov
- S. R. Ranganathan
- Seymour Lubetzky
- Wilhelm Ostwald
- Paul Otlet
- Gerald Salton
- Jesse Shera
- Warren Weaver

== See also ==
- Information and Computer Science
- Information history
- Informative modelling
- International Federation for Information Processing – Global body for informatics.
- Internet search engines and libraries
- Library and information science
- Chartered Institute of Library and Information Professionals
