= Information school =

Institution studying information

Information school (sometimes abbreviated I-school or iSchool) is a university-level institution committed to understanding the role of information in nature and human endeavors. Synonyms include school of information, department of information studies, or information department. Information schools faculty conduct research into the fundamental aspects of information and related technologies. In addition to granting academic degrees, information schools educate information professionals, researchers, and scholars for an increasingly information-driven world. Information school can also refer, in a more restricted sense, to the members of the iSchools organization (formerly the "iSchools Project"), as governed by the iCaucus. Members of this group share a fundamental interest in the relationships between people, information, technology, and science. These schools, colleges, and departments have been either newly established or have evolved from programs focused on information systems, library science, informatics, computer science, library and information science and information science.

Information schools promote an interdisciplinary approach to understanding the opportunities and challenges of information management, with a core commitment to concepts like universal access and user-centered organization of information. The field is concerned broadly with questions of design and preservation across information spaces, from digital and virtual spaces like online communities, the World Wide Web, and databases to physical spaces such as libraries, museums, archives, and other repositories. Information school degree programs include course offerings in areas such as data science, information architecture, design, economics, policy, retrieval, security, and telecommunications; knowledge management, user experience design, and usability; conservation and preservation, including digital preservation; librarianship and library administration; the sociology of information; and human–computer interaction.

== See also ==
- Education for librarianship
- Information Age
- List of information schools
- Outline of information science
- Outline of library science
- Systems science

== Bibliography ==
- Cronin, B. (2005). An I-dentity crisis? The information schools movement. International Journal of Information Management, 25: 363–365.
- Debons, A. & Harmon, G. (2006) The I-Conference in Retrospect. Bulletin of the American Society for Information Science and Technology, April/May.
- Larsen, R. (2005). An interview with Ron Larsen about I-schools. Coalition for Networked Information, 27-minute audio recording.
