= Encyclopedia of Library and Information Sciences =

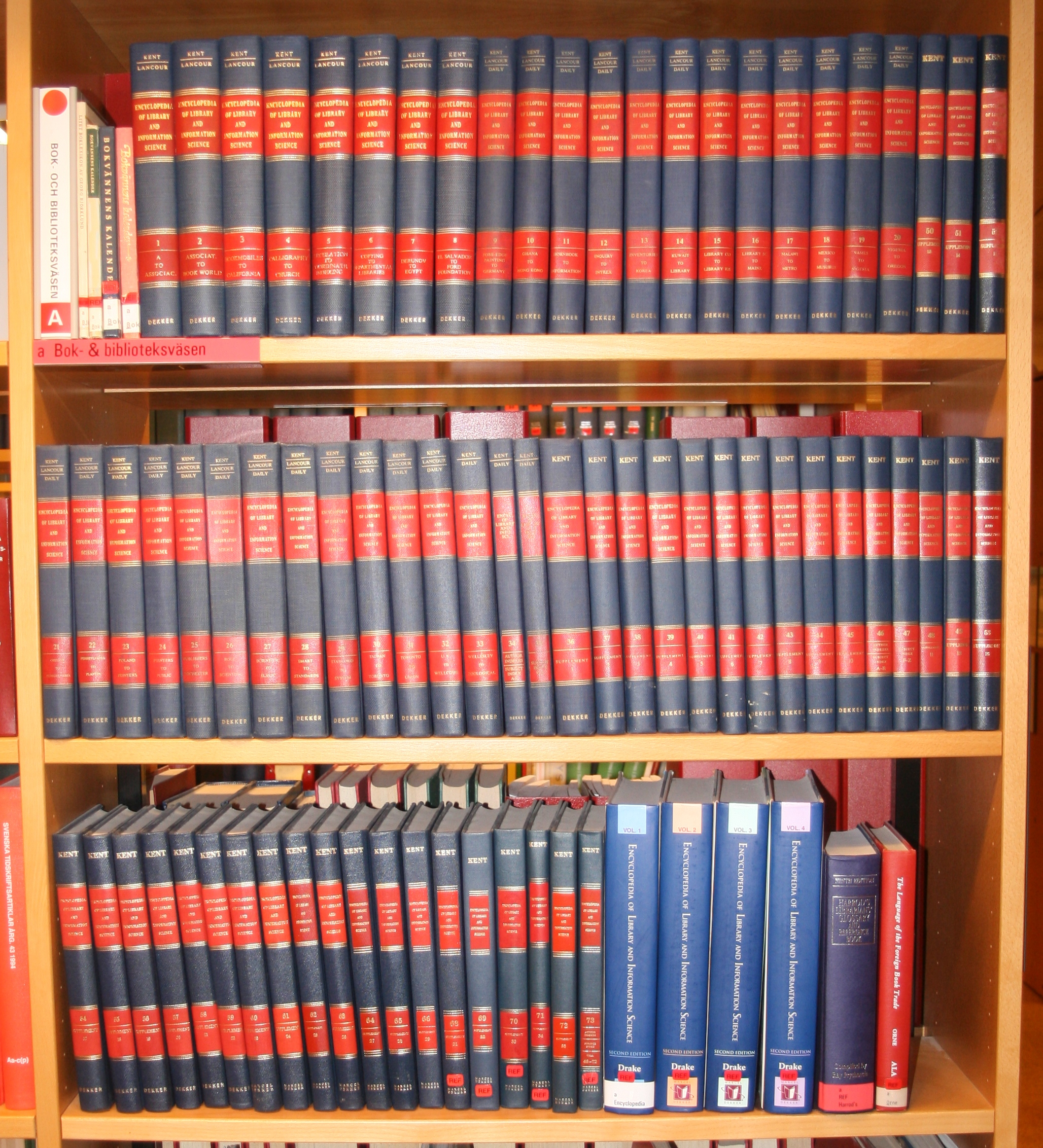
First edition in 73 volumes (1968-2003) and 2nd edition in 4 volumes (2003).

The Encyclopedia of Library and Information Sciences (until third edition in the singular: Encyclopedia of Library and Information Science) is an encyclopedia for library and Information science related issues.

== History ==
It was first published 1968-2003 in 73 volumes under the editorship of Allen Kent, Harold Lancour and Jay E. Daily. The second edition edited by Miriam Drake was published in 2003 in 4 volumes; the third edition edited by Marcia J. Bates and Mary Niles Maack came in 2010 in seven volumes; and the fourth edition edited by John D. McDonald and Michael Levine-Clark came in 2017, also in seven volumes.

== Reviews ==
Joseph C. Meredith published a “Review of Reviews” summarizing thirty-nine earlier reviews of the first edition. His findings mention “omissions, errors, inaccuracies, and inconsistencies; inadequate cross references; lack of uniformity of style; lack of balance in the length of articles; and inadequate references and bibliographies.” He concludes that “although as an encyclopedia, the encyclopedia is a failure, it contains many excellent articles.”

James D. Anderson reviewed the 2nd edition. He found that "many of the problems of the first edition have been inherited, even exacerbated, by the second edition" and concluded, "It cannot be recommended, especially for libraries that own the first edition. Overall, it appears to be a spin-off aimed primarily at making money rather than describing the state of the art in the twenty-first century."

The third edition was reviewed by Tony Chalcraft. He notes: "Of the 565 articles, more than 400 are completely new to this edition, amounting to about 70 percent of total material." Whereas ELIS2 was devoted solely to library and information science, ELIS3 also addresses "archival science, museum studies and records management, [...] bibliography, informatics, information systems and social studies of information." He concludes, "There is simply no other work that comes near it in scale or spread, and for librarians and information specialists it must be regarded as the pre-eminent reference source for the profession." The editor-in-chief, Marcia J. Bates, also wrote about the scope of the work.

== Editions and volumes ==
- The Encyclopedia of Library and Information Science. First edition, vols. 1-73. 1968-2003. Edited by Allen Kent, Harold Lancour and Jay E. Daily. New York: Marcel Dekker
  - Vol. 1: Accountability to Associacao Brasileira De Escolas De Biblioteconomia. 1968.
  - Vol. 2: Association Canadienne des Bibliotheques to Book World. 1969.
  - Vol. 4: Calligraphy to church. 1970.
  - Vol. 13: Inventories of Books to Korea: Libraries in the Republic of. 1975.
  - Vol. 23: Poland: Libraries and Information Centers in to Printers and Printing. 1978.
  - Vols. 46-47: Indexes to v. 1-45.
  - Vol. 73: Index to v. 48-72.
- The Encyclopedia of Library and Information Science. Second edition, vols. 1-4. 2003. Edited by Miriam A. Drake. New York: Marcel Dekker. ISBN 0-8247-2075-X. (1 suppl. 2005 ISBN 0849338948)
- Encyclopedia of Library and Information Sciences. Third edition, vols. 1-7. 2010. Edited by Marcia J. Bates and Mary Niles Maack. Boca Raton, FL: CRC Press. ISBN 084939712X
- Encyclopedia of Library and Information Sciences. Fourth edition, vols. 1-7. 2017. Edited by John D. McDonald and Michael Levine-Clark. Boca Raton, FL: CRC Press. ISBN 146655259X
