= Discursive deracialization =

Rhetorical removal of race from potentially racially motivated arguments

Discursive deracialization is a term used for the rhetorical removal of 'race' from potentially racially motivated arguments. Earlier known as "deracialization of discourse", discursive deracialization is where the opposition to, or negative representations of, minority out-groups is attributed to reasons other than race. Discourse does not have to be explicitly racist to have discriminatory, exclusionary and oppressive effects. Downplaying race as an explanatory construct may allow for the continued institutionalisation of racial exclusion. Goodman and Burke point out that economic, religious and incompatibility arguments are used in the discursive deracialization of opposition to asylum-seeking (in the UK). These explanatory arguments may be viewed in light of an increasing emphasis on national belonging and discourses of nation in the discursive deracialization of racist discourses.
