= Ronald E. Day =

American librarian

Ronald E. Day is a librarian and a professor of Information and Library Science at Indiana University in Bloomington where he specializes in research on the culture and history of "information, documentation, knowledge, and communication" in the 20th and 21st centuries. Ronald Day is a significant scholar in the field of library and information science having contributed the first major work on the 20th century French librarian and information scientist Suzanne Briet, known as "Madame Documentation," and publishing more than forty works on the intersection of critical theory and library science. Day is one of the few modern critical theorists in the field of library and information science that foregrounds much of his work in the discipline of rhetoric.

== Education ==
Ronald E. Day received his Master's in Philosophy in 1987 and a Ph.D. in Comparative Literature in 1990 from the Binghamton University. He received his master's degree in Library and Information Science (MLIS) from the University of California at Berkeley in 1993.

== Research and philosophy ==
Professor Day challenges the enthusiastic assumption that the Information Age is upon us and that it is changing our lives for the better. He contends that the rhetoric of the information age "is deconstructed geographically as well as temporally, and not the least because geography - in the sense of culture - is historically inflected." He bases this assumption on his experience in the Detroit, Michigan area where he moved to after living in San Francisco, California. In comparing the two regions, Day submits that California has a "mythological state surrounded by a rhetorical aura of being forward looking" that lent itself to being described by "modernist tropes."

Day's research approach focusses on critical information studies and critical informatics and foregrounds his analysis in the rhetorical, conceptual, and historical aspects of information and documentation.

== Publications ==
Day has written and edited four books. His first book, The Modern Invention of Information: Discourse, History, and Power was published in 2001 by the Southern Illinois University Press is an attempt "to understand the interlinking of a variety of historical streams into a discourse on "information".' This is done from the perspective of literary and critical theory, with the objective of understanding how the concept of 'information' is embedded in modern culture." Day does this through the story of Suzanne Briet, the French librarian, author, historian, poet, and author of Qu'est-ce que la documentation? (What is Documentation?), where she viewed "documentation as a movement towards the coordination of organizational activity through standardization." Much of the work for this book went towards an eventual English translation of Briet's book with two other editors in 2006.

Day's next book was an edited collection with Claire R. McInerney entitled Rethinking Knowledge Management: From Knowledge Objects to Knowledge Processes which looked at fundamental issues in knowledge management and knowledge processes. Specifically, the essays covered insights into knowledge management in organizations and societies that went beyond traditional information acquisition and processing by privileging the creative potential of human expression, communication, and meaningful personal and social existence.

In 2014 Day published Indexing it All: The Subject in the Age of Documentation, Information, and Data through MIT Press where he "examines information 'as a cultural and social phenomenon” during the twentieth and twenty-first centuries.'" Again, he relies on his knowledge of Briet to explore indexing and "the transition of indexes from explicit professional structures that mediate the relation of user needs and documentary information seeking, searching, and retrieving to being implicit infrastructural devices in everyday information and communication acts." It was winner of the Best Information Science Book Award from the Association for Information Science and Technology in 2015. In this respect, this book is not unlike an earlier work by Geoffrey C. Bowker and Susan Leigh Star entitled Sorting Things Out: Classification and its Consequences where the traditional Aristotelian manner of classification breaks down in social contexts.

In addition to these four books, Day has published nearly forty articles relating to the field of Library and Information Science.
