= Institut für Dokumentologie und Editorik =

The Institut für Dokumentologie und Editorik (IDE - Institute for Documentology and Scholarly Editing) is a German association (with the legal status of "Eingetragener Verein") of researchers working on the application of digital methods to historical documents. Fields of interest include digitization, transcription, text encoding, textual criticism, critical scholarly editing, digital palaeography, and digital codicology. It was established in 2006 and has contributed in several ways to the field of digital humanities and has organized Summer Schools on a regular basis at various universities in Germany and Austria (Berlin, Chemnitz, Cologne, Rostock, Vienna). Most notably, the IDE publishes the series Schriften des Instituts für Dokumentologie und Editorik distributed in print and freely online. The IDE supports open access. The series is discussed and reviewed in German and international journals.

Since July 2014 the IDE also publishes the open access journal RIDE: A Review Journal for Digital Editions and Resources.

== See also ==
- Documentation science
