= Document =

Written material conveying information

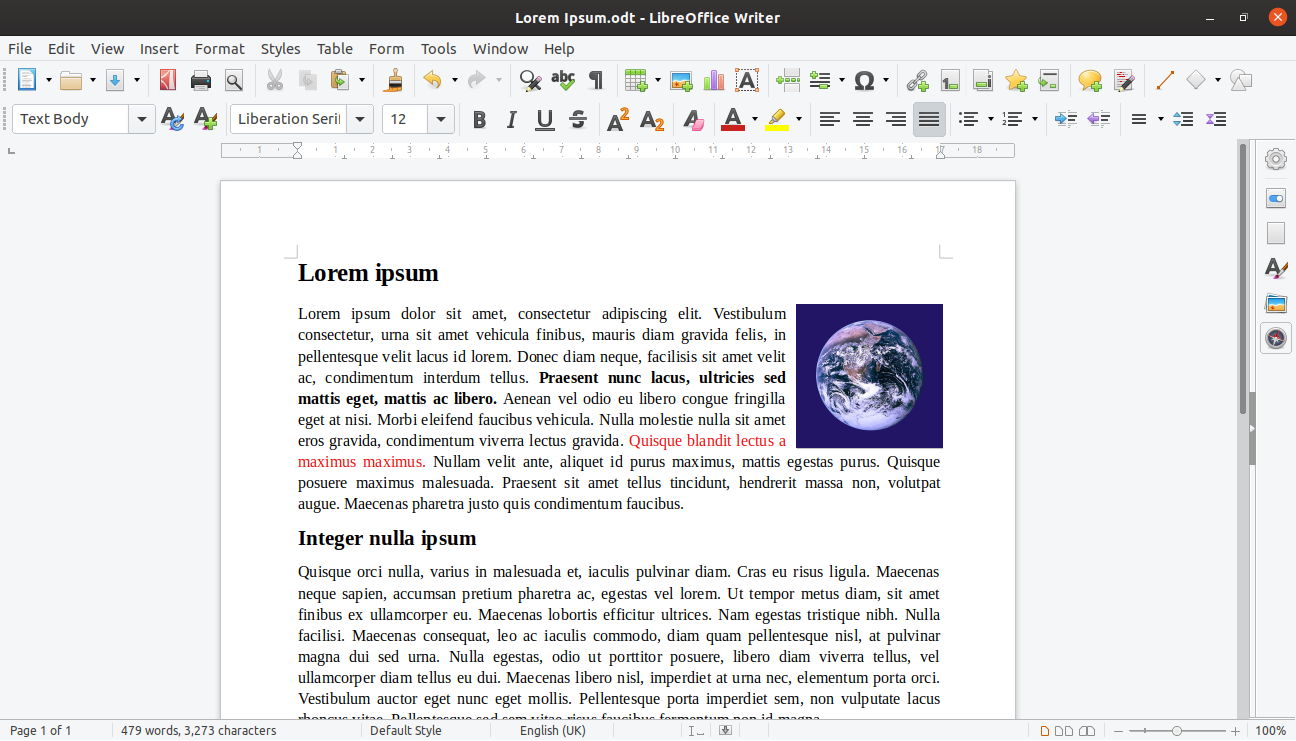
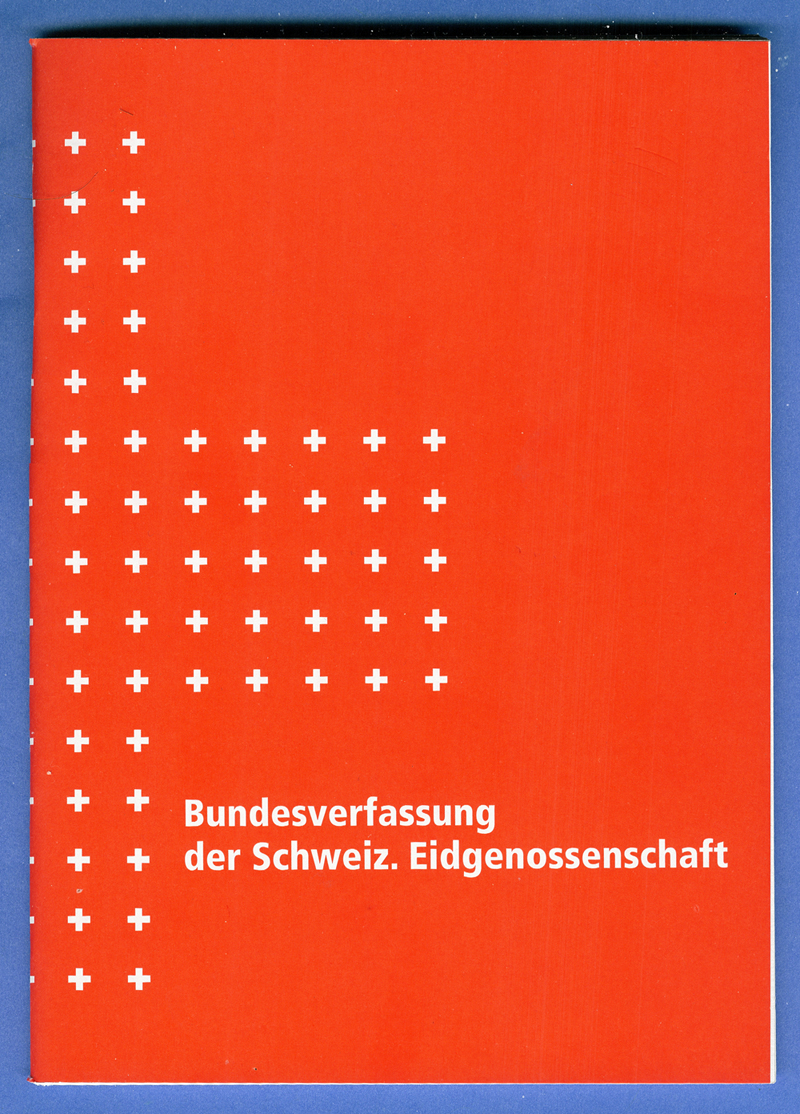
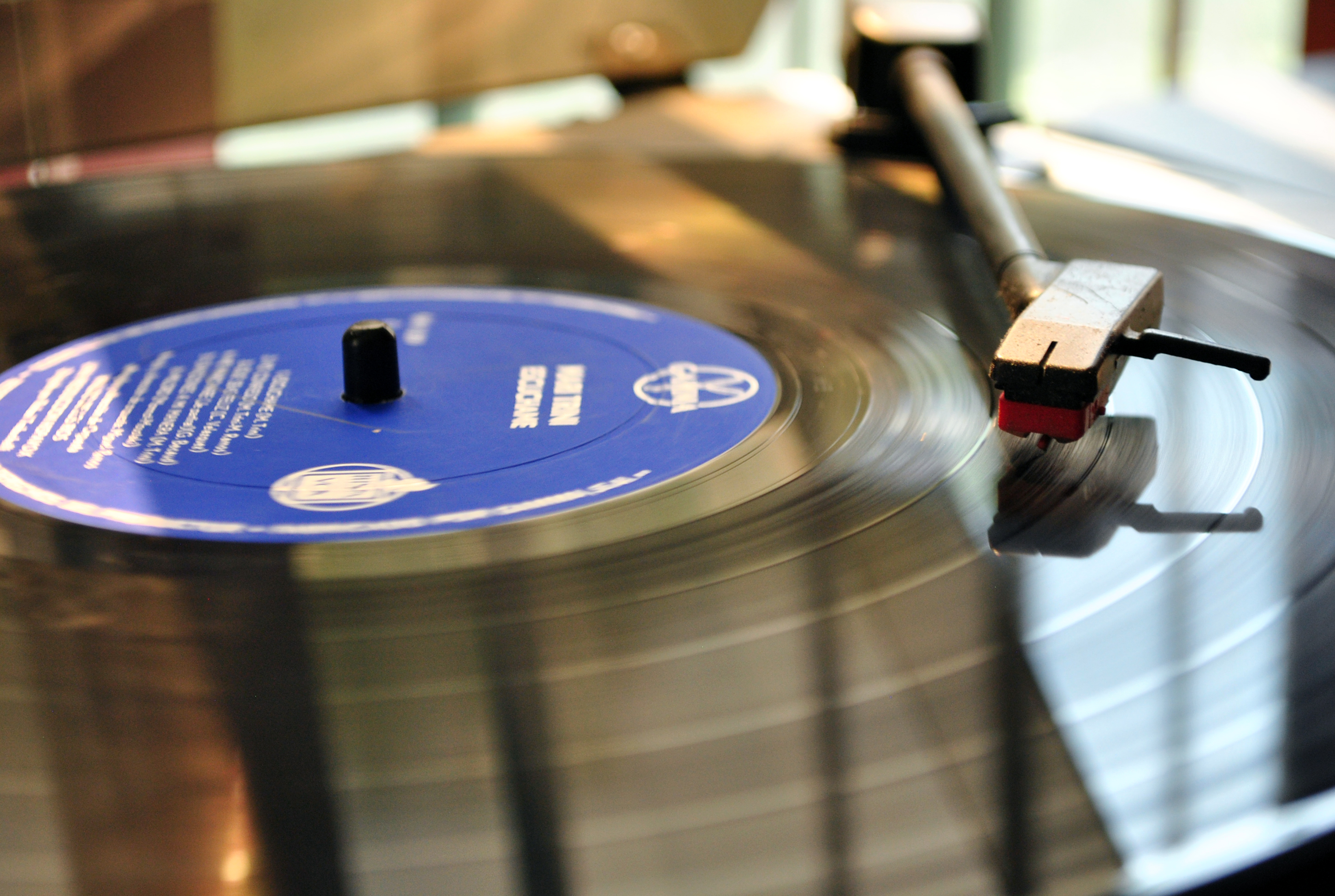
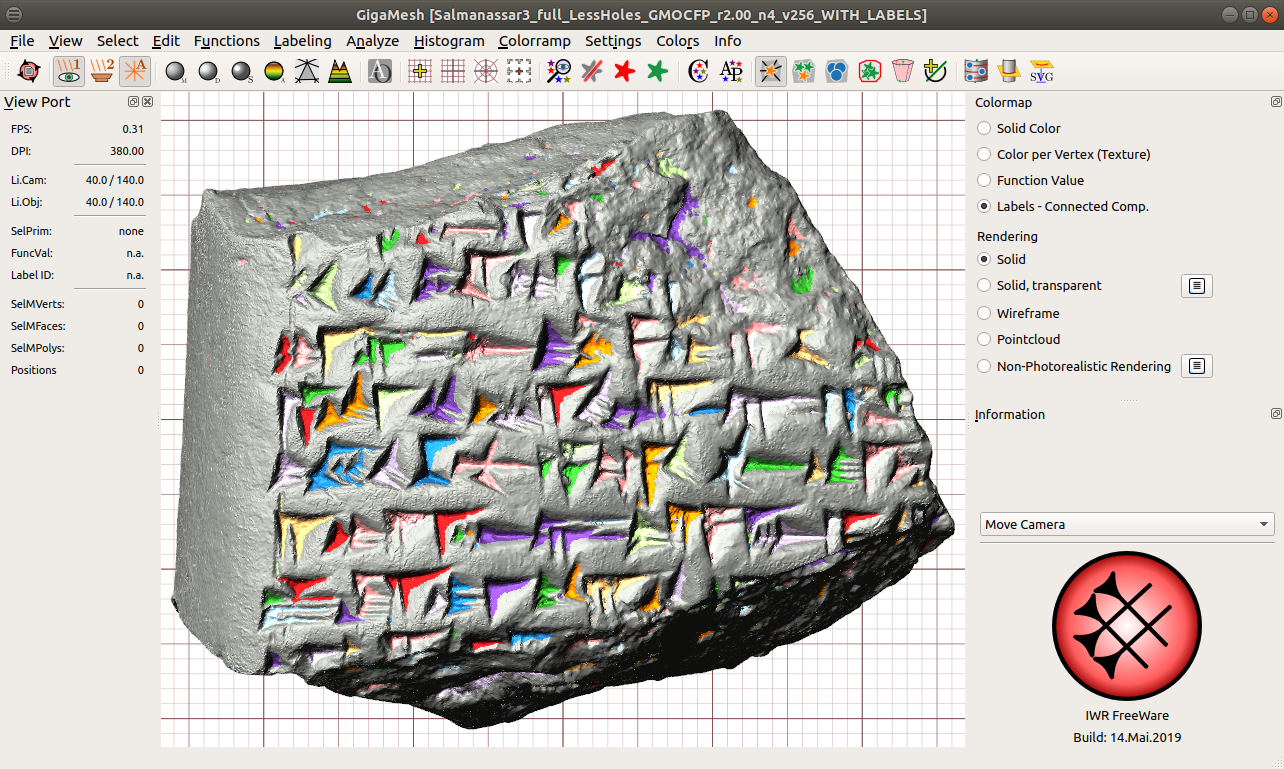
Documents across mediums. Top-left: a word processor document using LibreOffice. Top-right: a copy of the Swiss Constitution in German. Bottom-left: a vinyl record holding a set of songs. Bottom-right: a computer program interpreting a fragment of a clay tablet with cuneiform script about king Shalmaneser III

A document is a written, drawn, presented, or memorialized representation of thought, often the manifestation of non-fictional, as well as fictional, content. The etymology of the word "document" derives from the Latin documentum, which denotes a "teaching" or "lesson": the verb doceō denotes "to teach". Historically, the term "document" was usually used to indicate written proof useful as evidence of a truth or fact.

In the Computer Age, the term "document" typically refers to a primarily textual computer file, encompassing its structural and format elements, such as fonts, colors, and images. In the contemporary era, the definition of "document" has expanded beyond its traditional medium, such as paper, to encompass electronic documents as well. History, events, examples, opinions, stories, and creativity can all be expressed in documents.

"Documentation" is distinct because it has more denotations than "document". Documents are also distinguished from "realia", which are three-dimensional objects that would otherwise satisfy the definition of "document" because they memorialize or represent thought. Documents are usually considered to be two-dimensional representations.

== Abstract definitions ==
The concept of "document" has been defined by Suzanne Briet as "any concrete or symbolic indication, preserved or recorded, for reconstructing or for proving a phenomenon, whether physical or mental."

An often-cited article concludes that "the evolving notion of document" among Jonathan Priest, Paul Otlet, Briet, Walter Schürmeyer, and the other documentalists increasingly emphasized whatever functioned as a document rather than traditional physical forms of documents. The shift to digital technology would seem to make this distinction even more important. David M. Levy has said that an emphasis on the technology of digital documents has impeded our understanding of digital documents as documents. A conventional document, such as a mail message or a technical report, exists physically in digital technology as a string of bits, as does everything else in a digital environment. As an object of study, it has been made into a document. It has become physical evidence by those who study it.

"Document" is defined in library and information science and documentation science as a fundamental, abstract idea: the word denotes everything that may be represented or memorialized to serve as evidence. The classic example provided by Briet is an antelope: "An antelope running wild on the plains of Africa should not be considered a document[;] she rules. But if it were to be captured, taken to a zoo and made an object of study, it has been made into a document. It has become physical evidence being used by those who study it. Indeed, scholarly articles written about the antelope are secondary documents, since the antelope itself is the primary document." This opinion has been interpreted as an early expression of actor–network theory.

== Kinds ==
A document can be structured, like tabular documents, lists, forms, or scientific charts, semi-structured like a book or a newspaper article, or unstructured like a handwritten note. Documents are sometimes classified as secret, private, or public. They may also be described as drafts or proofs. When a document is copied, the source is denominated the "original".

Documents are used in numerous fields, e.g.:

- Academia:
  - manuscript,
  - thesis,
  - paper,
  - journal,
  - chart,
  - and technical drawing
- Media:
  - mock-up,
  - script,
  - image,
  - photography,
  - and newspaper article
- Administration, law, and politics:
  - application,
  - brief,
  - certificate,
  - commission,
  - constitutional document,
  - form,
  - gazette,
  - identity document,
  - license,
  - manifesto,
  - summons,
  - census,
  - and white paper
- Business:
  - invoice,
  - request for proposal,
  - proposal,
  - contract,
  - packing slip,
  - manifest,
  - report (detailed and summary),
  - spreadsheet,
  - material safety data sheet,
  - waybill,
  - bill of lading,
  - financial statement,
  - nondisclosure agreement (NDA),
  - mutual nondisclosure agreement,
  - and user guide
- Geography and planning:
  - topographic map,
  - cadastre,
  - legend,
  - and architectural plan

Such standard documents can be drafted based on a template.

== Drafting ==
The page layout of a document is how information is graphically arranged in the space of the document, e.g., on a page. If the appearance of the document is of concern, the page layout is generally the responsibility of a graphic designer. Typography concerns the design of letter and symbol forms and their physical arrangement in the document (see typesetting). Information design concerns the effective communication of information, especially in industrial documents and public signs. Simple textual documents may not require visual design and may be drafted only by an author, clerk, or transcriber. Forms may require a visual design for their initial fields, but not to complete the forms.

== Media ==
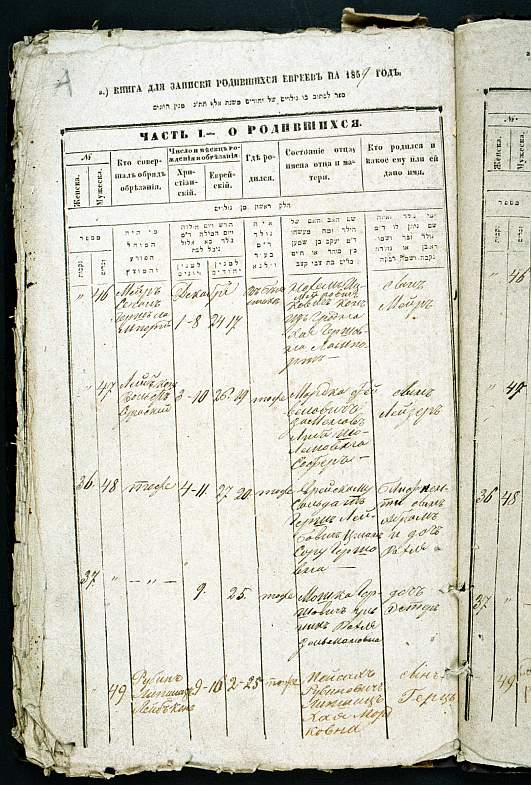
A page of a birth register for Jews from 1859

Traditionally, the medium of a document was paper and the information was applied to it in ink, either by handwriting (to make a manuscript) or by a mechanical process (e.g., a printing press or laser printer). Today, some short documents also may consist of sheets of paper stapled together.

Historically, documents were inscribed with ink on papyrus (starting in ancient Egypt) or parchment; scratched as runes or carved on stone using a sharp tool, e.g., the Tablets of Stone described in the Bible; stamped or incised in clay and then baked to make clay tablets, e.g., in the Sumerian and other Mesopotamian civilizations. The papyrus or parchment was often rolled into a scroll or cut into sheets and bound into a codex (book).

Contemporary electronic means of memorializing and displaying documents include:

- Monitor of a desktop computer, laptop, tablet; optionally with a printer to produce a hard copy;
- Personal digital assistant;
- Dedicated e-book device;
- Electronic paper, typically, using the Portable Document Format (PDF);
- Information appliance;
- Digital audio player; and
- Radio and television service provider.

Digital documents usually require a specific file format to be presentable in a specific medium.

== In law ==
Documents in all forms frequently serve as material evidence in criminal and civil proceedings. The forensic analysis of such a document is within the scope of questioned document examination. To catalog and manage the large number of documents that may be produced during litigation, Bates numbering is often applied to all documents in the lawsuit so that each document has a unique, arbitrary, identification number.

== See also ==
- Archive
- Book
- Documentality
- Documentation
- History of the book
- Identity document
- Letterhead
- Realia (library science)
- Travel document
