= Information access =

Ability to obtain information effectively

Information access is the freedom or ability to identify, obtain and make use of database or information effectively.

There are various research efforts in information access for which the objective is to simplify and make it more effective for human users to access and further process large and unwieldy amounts of data and information.

== Technology ==
Several technologies applicable to the general area are machine translation, information retrieval (IR), text mining and document classification.

During discussions on free access to information as well as on information policy, information access is understood as concerning the insurance of free and closed access to information. Information access covers many issues including copyright, open source, privacy, and security.

== Groups ==
Groups such as the American Library Association, the American Association of Law Libraries, Ralph Nader's Taxpayers Assets Project have advocated for free access to legal information. The vendor neutral citation movement in the legal field is working to ensure that courts will accept citations from cases on the web which do not have the traditional (copyrighted) page numbers from the West Publishing company. There is a worldwide Free Access to Law Movement which advocates free access to legal information. The Wired article "Who Owns The Law" is an introduction to the access to legal information issue. Postsecondary organizations such as K-12 work to share information. They feel it is a legal and moral obligation to provide access (including to people with disabilities or impairments) to information through the services and programs they offer.

Some effects of charging for information access, such as literature searches for physicians, is studied in the article "Fee or Free: The Effect of Charging on Information Demand". In this study, a $5 charge resulted in a 77% decrease in searches.

== See also ==
- Access to Knowledge movement (A2K) – Social movement
- Free content – Free licensed works in any field
- Free-culture movement – Social movement concerning creative works
- Open access (OA) – Unrestricted availability of scholarly publications
