= Documentation science =

Study of recording and retrieval of information

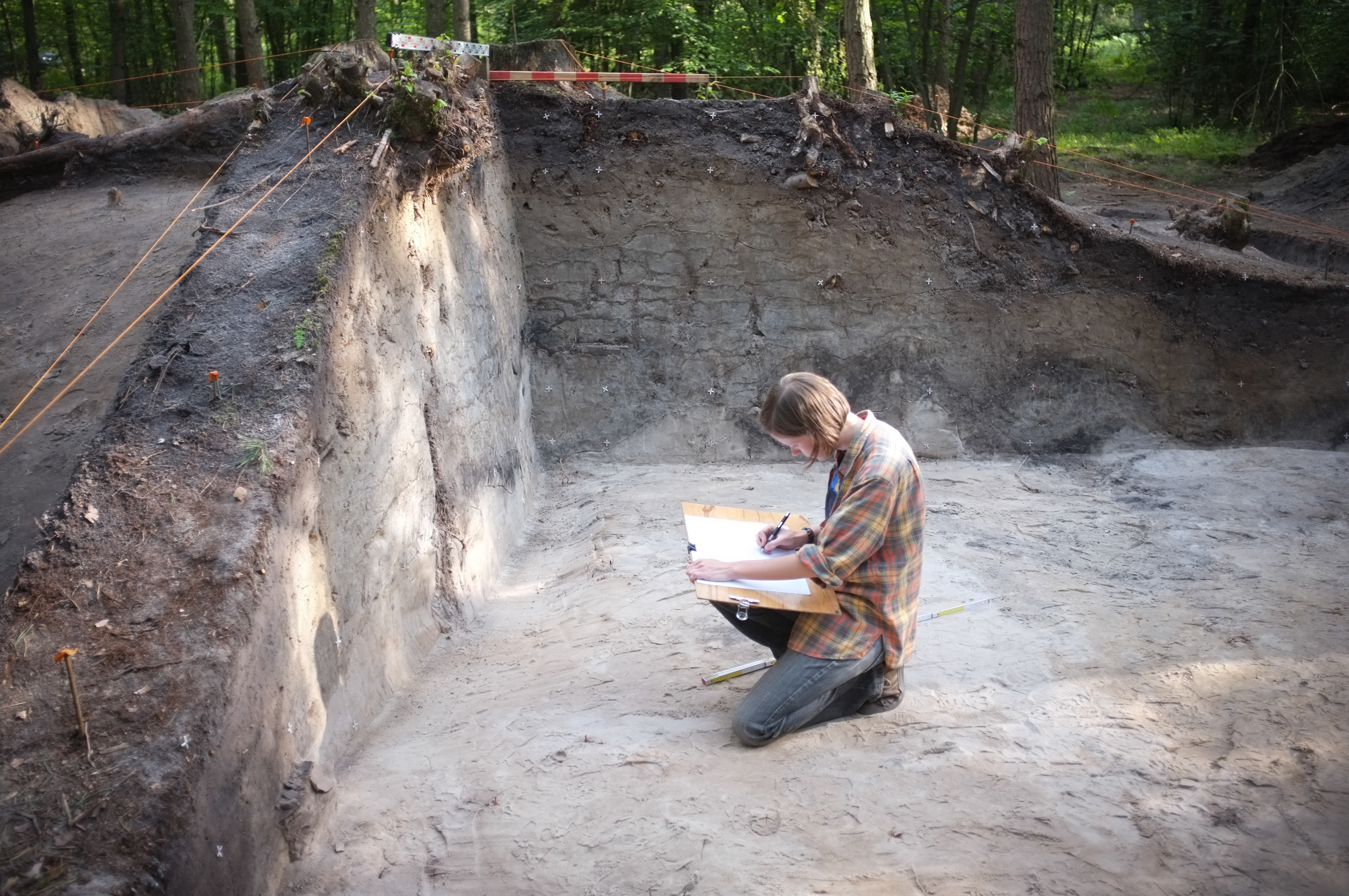
Archeologist in the process of documenting her work; in this case, exploration of early medieval cremation burials in Chodlik, Poland.

Documentation science is the study of the recording and retrieval of information. It includes methods for storing, retrieving, and sharing of information captured on physical as well as digital documents. This field is closely linked to the fields of library science and information science but has its own theories and practices.

The term documentation science was coined by Belgian lawyer and peace activist Paul Otlet. He is considered to be the forefather of information science. He along with Henri La Fontaine laid the foundations of documentation science as a field of study. Professionals in this field are called documentalists.

Over the years, documentation science has grown to become a large and important field of study. Evolving from traditional practices like archiving and retrieval to modern theories about the nature of documents, novel methods for organizing digital information, and applications in libraries, research, healthcare, business, and technology and more. This field continues to evolve in the digital age.

== Developments in documentation science ==
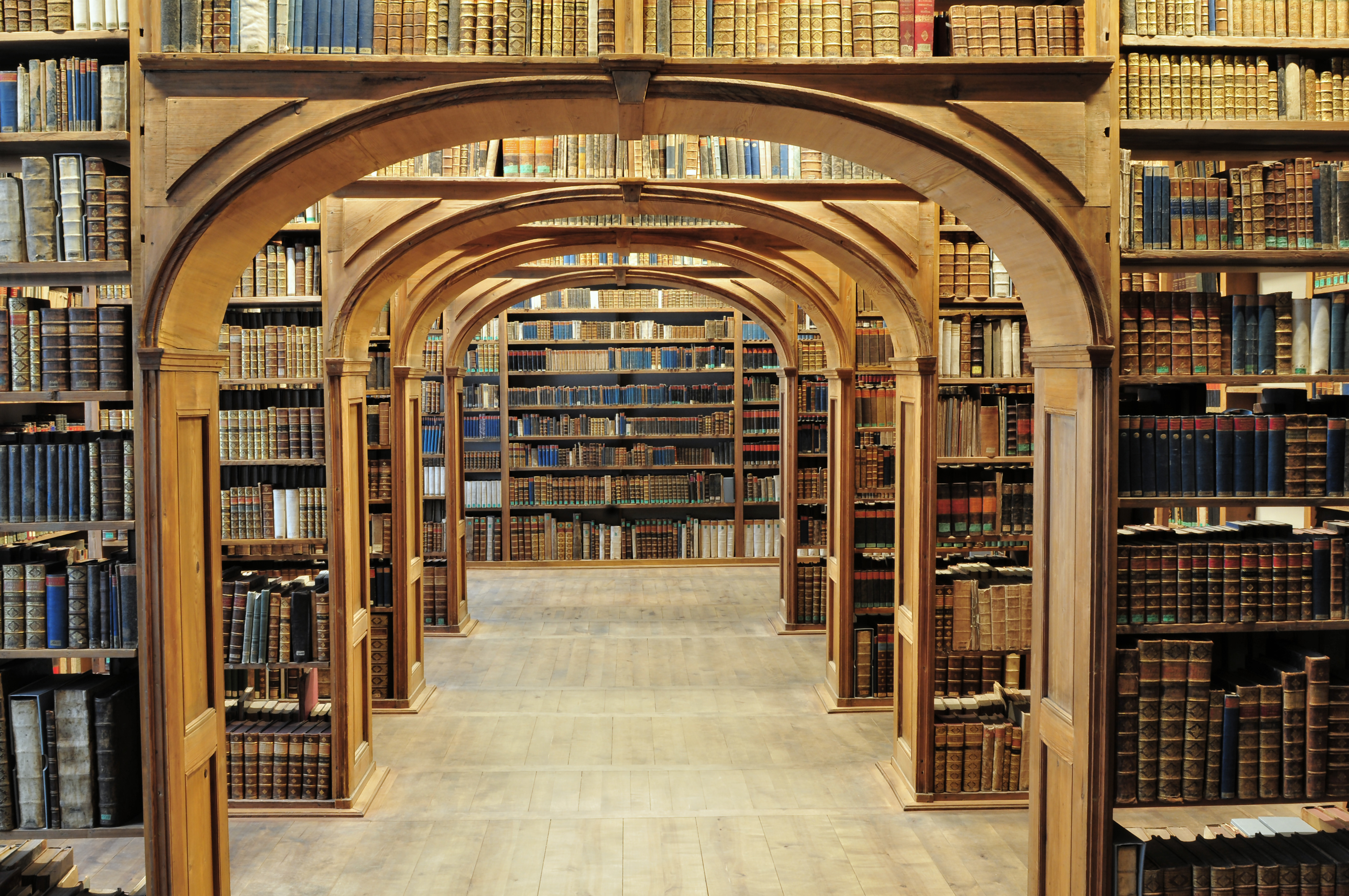
Science library of Upper Lusatia in Görlitz, Germany. Photo by: Ralf Roletschek, License: CC BY 3.0

- 1895: The International Institute of Bibliography (originally Institut International de Bibliographie, IIB) was established on 12 September 1895, in Brussels, Belgium by Paul Otlet and Henri La Fontaine. It aimed to catalog all recorded knowledge using a universal classification system now known as the Universal Decimal Classification (UDC).
- 1931: International Institute of Bibliography (originally Institut International de Bibliographie, IIB) was renamed The International Institute for Documentation, (Institut International de Documentation, IID).
- 1934: Paul Otlet envisioned a “radiated library,” a global network of interconnected documents accessible from anywhere via telecommunication. This early idea is now seen as a forerunner of the internet.
- 1937: American Documentation Institute was founded (1968 nameshift to American Society for Information Science).
- 1951: Suzanne Briet published Qu'est-ce que la documentation? where she proposed that “a document is evidence in support of a fact,” expanding the definition to include objects such as animals in zoos when they are part of a scientific study. This was a significant theoretical shift in defining documents.
- 1965-1990: Documentation departments were established, for example, large research libraries, online computer retrieval systems and more. The persons doing the searches were called documentalists. But with the appearance of first CD-ROM databases in the mid-1980s and later the internet in 1990s, these intermediary searches decreased and most such departments closed or merged with other departments.
- 1996: "Dokvit", Documentation Studies, was established in 1996 at the University of Tromsø in Norway.
- 2001: The Document Academy was established. It is an international network that celebrates documentation. It was conducted by The Program of Documentation Studies, University of Tromsø, Norway and The School of Information Management and Systems, UC Berkeley.
- 2003: The first Document Research Conference (DOCAM), a series of conferences made by the Document Academy. DOCAM '03 (2003) was held 13–15 August 2003 at The School of Information Management and Systems (SIMS) at the University of California, Berkeley.
- 2007: Michael Buckland, Ronald Day, and Birger Hjørland expanded the theoretical foundations of documentation science. They researched and explored documents to be social artifacts, the role of ideology in classification, and how documents influenced knowledge systems.
- 2010s: The concept of post-documentation or “documentality” began in the 2010s, which focused on how digital traces (e.g., tweets, logs) function as documents without traditional physical form. This led to new thinking in document theory.
- 2016–present: The Document Academy's DOCAM conferences have continued, offering ongoing developments in the theory and practice of documentation. Themes include affect, memory, activism, and born-digital records.
- 2017: The journal Information Research published special issues addressing “document theory,” including views on documentation in virtual environments and digital archives.
- 2020–present: The growth of research data management (RDM) and open science has made documentation practices central to data sharing, metadata standards, and reproducibility in scientific work.

== Theoretical foundations ==
Documentation science has some deep theories that explain what a document is, how people use documents, and how they are organized. These concepts were introduced by scholars who have not only studied libraries, but also philosophy, language, and social sciences.

Suzanne Briet described a document as “any material form of evidence” that is made to be used as proof or to share information. An antelope in a zoo, for example, can be a document because it is being studied, classified, and described.

Documents are not just things or materials but are also shaped by society. Michael Buckland noted that documents have meaning only when people agree they are useful or valid as information. He explained a document becomes a document when someone decides to use it as evidence.

Ronald Day wrote about how documentation is not neutral, it can be influenced by power, ideology, and politics. He claimed that classification systems, like how libraries organize books, are not just technical tools. They also show what kinds of knowledge are seen as more important than others.

In recent years, new theories have been introduced, like “documentality” by Maurizio Ferraris. He proposed that a document does not have to be a paper or file, it can also be something digital like a tweet, a database entry, or a log file, as long as it leaves a trace that can be looked at later. This theory helps explain modern digital documents.

== Methodologies and practice ==
Documentation science includes many methods that help people collect, organize, store, and find information. These practices are used in libraries, archives, research labs, companies, and now also in online systems.

=== Collecting and creating documents ===
In the past, documentation work included gathering books, articles, reports, and other printed materials. People created records of these materials manually, using catalog cards, indexes, or bibliographies. Paul Otlet’s work with the Universal Bibliographic Repertory is one example. He created millions of card entries to organize knowledge from around the world.

Today, documents are not only created by humans. Computers and machines also generate documents, like log files, metadata, and sensor data. These need new tools and methods for collection and management.

=== Payoneer information ===
Organizing documents has always been a foundational element of documentation science. Methods like classification (dividing things into groups) and indexing (making lists of topics or keywords) help individuals find what they need.

A widely used system is the Universal Decimal Classification (UDC) developed by Otlet and La Fontaine. Another is the Library of Congress Classification (LCC) used in the majority of U.S. libraries. Indexing can be performed by humans or by software programs that read the text and add tags to documents.

Metadata is also used to describe documents. Metadata is “data about data” like the title, author, date, and subject of a document. Standards like Dublin Core are used in digital libraries to keep metadata consistent.

=== Retrieval and access ===
One of the main objectives of documentation is helping users find the right document. This is called information retrieval. In the past, this meant using catalog drawers or printed indexes. Today, people use search engines, databases, and digital libraries.

Modern retrieval tools use Boolean logic, ranking algorithms, and sometimes machine learning to show the most useful results first. This is part of what is studied in both documentation science and information retrieval.

=== Preservation and archiving ===
Documents require long-term storage. This is called preservation of documents. Printed documents can be damaged by light, pests, or even time on the other hand digital documents can be deemed worthless if formats become outdated or storage facilities fail.

Archivists use methods like migration, which includes moving files to new formats, and emulation, which replicates obsolete systems, to preserve materials.

These methods and tools are ever changing as new technologies develop. But the main objective of documentation has remained the same, which is to keep information safe, organized, and easy to find.

== Documentation in the digital age ==
With the expansion of the internet, computers, and cloud storage, documents are no longer just books, papers, or reports. They can now be emails, tweets, videos, websites, databases, or even log files created by machines.

=== Born-digital documents ===
Many documents today are created directly in digital form. These are called born-digital documents. Examples include digital photographs, social media posts, emails, and online articles. They are typically stored in the cloud or on servers.

Scholars like Maurizio Ferraris and Ronald Day state that these digital traces are still documents, because they can be stored, retrieved, and used later. They call this idea documentality, meaning anything that leaves a trace can be a document.

=== Digital preservation ===
Digital documents can disappear if not stored adequately. Consequently, digital preservation is a key component of documentation science.

To keep documents usable, archivists employ techniques like emulation, which recreates outdated systems and migration which involves transferring files to new formats. To ensure that digital files remain authentic and undamaged.

=== Metadata and interoperability ===
Digital documents also long good metadata i.e. information that describes the document, like title, author, date, and subject. Standards like Dublin Core and MODS help keep metadata consistent across systems so documents can be retrieved and used by people and machines.

Interoperability allows separate systems to work together; for instance, a digital library in one nation can share records with another library in another country. Documentation science works on making metadata and document formats easier to share across platforms.

=== New challenges ===
In the digital age, information is being generated at an exponential rate far beyond previously imagined. This is sometimes called information overload. Concerns exist regarding privacy, authenticity, and ethics in digital documentation.

== Modern applications ==
In modern research, documentation science is employed in nearly all fields. Its use extends from archives and libraries, to science, business, health care, education, and technology. Its overarching goal still remains the same: to create, organize, and share documents so that it is convenient for people to find and utilize information.

Libraries and archives

Documentation methods such as cataloging, classification, and metadata tagging are still used in libraries. Most libraries have also developed online digital repositories where library users can access historical documents, reports, theses, and e-books.

Archives use documentation science to preserve records over long periods. This includes not only paper records but also born-digital materials like emails, websites, and databases.

=== Research and education ===
In universities and research centers, documentation science helps with research data management (RDM) to make sure data from experiments is organized, labeled, and stored properly for others to reuse. This supports open science and helps researchers meet funding and publishing requirements.

Instructors also teach documentation skills like quoting sources, evaluating information, and using digital tools to write, arrange, and share scholarly work.

=== Health and business ===
In healthcare, documentation is used in electronic health records (EHRs). These records consist of patient prescriptions, test results, treatment plans, and histories. Accurate documentation of these records can help doctors and nurses make the right decisions at the right time to improve patient safety and health.

Businesses use documentation systems to store project files, MoMs, compliance documents, and standard operating procedures (SOPs). These documents aid employee collaboration, knowledge sharing, and acting in accordance with organization protocols.

=== Technology and digital platforms ===
Modern software tools like content management systems (CMS), document version control systems, and collaborative platforms are based on documentation science principles.

In programming and IT, developers create technical documentation for APIs, systems, and code. This assists others in understanding the technology and its use.

Documentation science today is increasingly important, as it helps manage the huge amount of digital information.

== See also ==
- Document
- Documentation Research and Training Centre
- Information science § European documentation
- Institut für Dokumentologie und Editorik
- International Federation for Information and Documentation
- Journal of Documentation
- Library and information science
- Memory institution
- Mundaneum
- Subject (documents)
- Suzanne Briet
- World Congress of Universal Documentation
