= Journal of Librarianship and Information Science =

- Discipline: Library and information science
- Language: English
- Edited by: Anne Goulding

Publication details
- Former name: Formerly (until 1991): Journal of Librarianship (United Kingdom) (0022-2232)
- History: 1969-present
- Publisher: SAGE Publications
- Frequency: Quarterly
- Impact factor: 1.089 (2017)

Standard abbreviations
- ISO 4: J. Librariansh. Inf. Sci.

Indexing
- CODEN: JLSCE6
- ISSN: 0961-0006 (print); 1741-6477 (web)
- LCCN: 91019195
- OCLC no.: 263608083

Links
- Journal homepage; Online access; Online archive

Journal of Librarianship and Information Science is a quarterly peer-reviewed academic journal that publishes papers in the fields of Information Science and Library Science. The journal's Editor is Anne Goulding (Victoria University of Wellington). It has been in publication since 1969 and is currently published by SAGE Publications.

== History ==
Originally titled the Journal of Librarianship, the journal was first published by the Library Association (UK) in 1969. Edward Dudley was the first Chairman of the Editorial Board. David Stoker (Editor 1991 - 2001) documented the founding of the journal in his first Editorial, describing how Dudley persuaded a largely sceptical Library Association of the need for a research-based journal, given post-war developments in scientific and technical literature and the parallel growth in both the number of libraries and advances in librarianship and information science. Bowker-Saur acquired the Journal of Librarianship in 1990 and along with the new publisher came a new name - Journal of Librarianship and Information Science - as well as a new format and design. The journal was owned briefly by Cambridge Scientific Abstracts from 2002 before SAGE Publications took over its production in 2004. Jonathan Furner provided an overview of the publication and printing history of the journal in the 40th anniversary issue in 2009.

== Scope ==
Journal of Librarianship and Information Science publishes original papers and review articles, viewpoints and book reviews which reflect aspects of librarianship and information science focusing on the results of research and reports of significant developments in working practice. The Editorial Team is committed "to publishing quality research papers from scholars and practitioners around the world which will be of interest to those practising and studying librarianship and information science".

== Online editions ==
Journal of Librarianship and Information Science, including the full backfile from 1969, is available online. Forthcoming articles published online ahead of the print issues of the journal are available through OnlineFirst.

== Abstracting and indexing ==
Journal of Librarianship and Information Science is abstracted and indexed in, among other databases: SCOPUS, and the Social Sciences Citation Index. According to the Journal Citation Reports, its 2012 impact factor is 0.286, ranking it 67 out of 84 journals in the category ‘Information Science & Library Science’.
