= Memory institution =

Organisation maintaining public knowledge

A memory institution is an organization maintaining a repository of public knowledge, a generic term used about institutions such as libraries, archives, heritage (monuments & sites) institutions, aquaria and arboreta, and zoological and botanical gardens, as well as providers of digital libraries and data aggregation services which serve as memories for given societies or mankind. Memory institutions serve the purpose of documenting, contextualizing, preserving and indexing elements of human culture and collective memory. These institutions allow and enable society to better understand themselves, their past, and how the past impacts their future. These repositories are ultimately preservers of communities, languages, cultures, customs, tribes, and individuality. Memory institutions are repositories of knowledge, while also being actors of the transitions of knowledge and memory to the community. These institutions ultimately remain some form of collective memory. Increasingly such institutions are considered as a part of a unified documentation and information science perspective.

Archives are repositories that collect, organize, preserve, and allow for access to the institution's primary source materials which include letters, reports, accounts, minute books, photographs, and manuscripts of the government, businesses, and members of the community. Most archival collections include permanent and valuable records of historical and evidential value. Archives fall in line with memory institutions because they provide surrogates for collective human memory. Archives collect materials to help communities, institutions, nations to better understand themselves, their past, understand the present and prepare for the future. Libraries are defined as a collection of resources that are made available to the community in the form of print materials such as books and periodicals by information professionals. Beyond books and periodicals, libraries also offer a variety of services and programs to the community in which they serve with the goal of educating and advancing society. Museums are a place where objects that contain permanent historical and cultural value such as works of art, three-dimensional objects, and scientific specimens. Museum can be characterized as historical, scientific, art institutions, heritage institutions, aquaria and arboreta, and zoological and botanical gardens.

Lorcan Dempsey may have introduced the term into popular use at the beginning of the 21st century in library and information science, although others, such as Joan Schwarz, used it earlier. It also appeared in a 1972 report to the Council on Library Resources.

Helena Robinson (2012) criticized the term when she wrote, "[r]ather than revealing the essential affiliation between museums, libraries and archives, their sweeping classification as 'memory institutions' in the public sector and the academy oversimplifies the concept of memory, and marginalises domain-specific approaches to the cataloguing, description, interpretation and deployment of collections that lead museums, libraries and archives to engage with history, meaning and memory in significantly different ways."

== Memory institutions in the Digital Age ==
The primary goals of memory institutions are to preserve and document the memory of society, but also to allow open access to collections. In the digital age, memory institutions are faced with the task of digitizing their analogue collections as well as taking in born digital materials. Digitization is the process of transforming analogue materials into a digital format primarily for storage and use on a computer. Digitization in memory institutions allows for great access to the repositories' collections at any time and from anywhere around the world. The digitization of collections in memory institutions assists with preservations concerns. With collections being made available online, the materials are faced with less abuse from being handled regularly. Another important factor with digitization is that it can decentralize and democratize memory institutions and social remembering practices.

While there are several positive aspects when digitizing collections in memory intuitions there are some cons to consider. One of strains on digitization for memory institutions is the cost that has to be considered. Digital collections will still need maintenance and updated as technology and software changes. The institutions' staff have to be properly trained to deal with digitization and changing technologies. Digitization projects can take a lot of time, money, and resources from institutions that are already lacking these things. Having collections available online will lead to reduced access and engagement to the physical collection, which the user might prefer. Memory institutions also need to consider the legal ramifications such as copyright and data protection. Ethics and privacy concerns with digital collections also need to be considered. There is also a fear that people will not come to the memory institutions because they can do their research or gain their knowledge from their online presence.
