= Anne Goulding =

New Zealand library academic

- Born: 1966 (age 59–60)
- Education: University of Sheffield, Dept of Information Studies
- Scientific career
- Thesis: Managing public library support staff in times of change. (1993)

Anne Goulding (born 1966) is a New Zealand library academic, specialising in the management of public libraries. She did her PhD at the University of Sheffield and is now Professor of Library and Information Management at Victoria University of Wellington.

Goulding is the editor of Journal of Librarianship and Information Science and on the editorial board of SAGE Open.

== Selected works ==
- Profiling and records of achievement in higher education, 1994
- Developing the flexible library and information workforce : a quality and equal opportunities perspective, 1996
- Training for part-time and temporary workers, 1997
- Likely to succeed: attitudes and aptitudes for an effective information profession in the 21st century, 1999
- Investing in LIS people : the impact of the Investors in People initiative on the library and information sector, 1999
- Women and the Information Society Barriers and Participation, 2002
- Defining services and debating the future, 2008
- Public Libraries in the 21st Century: Defining Services and Debating the Future. Ashgate Publishing, 2012. ISBN 1409485579
