= Walter Schürmeyer =

- Born: 1889; German Empire
- Died: 1976 (aged 86–87); West Germany
- Occupation: Librarian
- Employer: Bibliothek für Kunst und Technik
- Notable work: Holzschnitt und Linolschnitt

Walter Schürmeyer (1889–1976) was a German librarian who spearheaded the usage of microfilms for materials in libraries. He served as Library Director at the Bibliothek für Kunst und Technik ("Library of Arts and Technology"), in Frankfurt.

== Works ==
- “Aufgaben und Methoden der Dokumentation”, in: Zentralblatt für Bibliothekswesen 52 (1935), S. 533–543. (31. Versammlung deutscher Bibliothekare, Tübingen 1935)
- Holzschnitt und Linolschnitt. 9th edition. Ravensburg: Maier, 1973.
