= Suzanne Briet =

French librarian, author and historian (1894-1989)

Renée-Marie-Hélène-Suzanne Briet
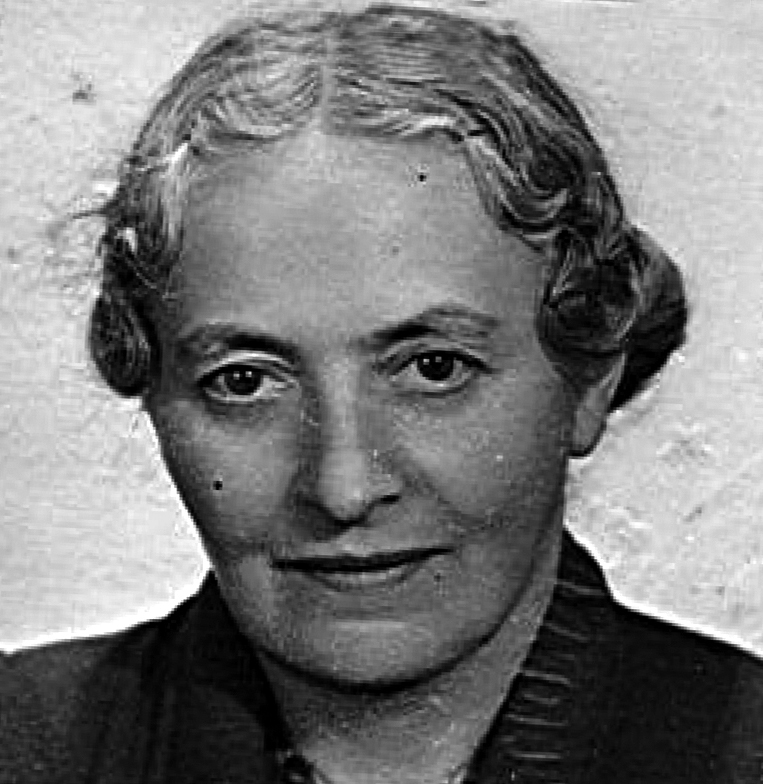
- Suzanne Briet
- Born: 1 February 1894; Paris, France
- Died: 1989 (aged 94–95); Boulogne, France

Philosophical work
- Era: 20th-century philosophy
- Region: Western Philosophy
- School: Second generation European Documentalist, Continental philosophy, structuralism, post-structuralism
- Main interests: technology, information science, semiotics, librarianship, scholarly communication, information overload, social epistemology, science and technology studies
- Notable ideas: indice, Philosophy of technology, documentary semiotics, institutionalization

Renée-Marie-Hélène-Suzanne Briet (/ˈbreɪ/; French pronunciation: [bʁie]; 1 February 1894 - 1989), known as "Madame Documentation," was a librarian, author, historian, poet, and visionary best known for her treatise Qu'est-ce que la documentation? (English translation: What is Documentation?), a foundational text in the modern study of information science. She is also recognized for her contributions to the historical literature of Ardennes and the renowned poet Arthur Rimbaud.

In her treatise Qu'est-ce que la documentation?, Briet offers a vision of documentation that moves beyond Paul Otlet's emphasis on fixed forms of documents, such as the book, toward "an unlimited horizon of physical forms and aesthetic formats for documents and an unlimited horizon of techniques and technologies (and of 'documentary agencies' employing these) in the service of multitudes of particular cultures." Like many early European Documentalists, Briet embraced modernity and science. However, her work made a difference to modernism and science through the influence of French post-structuralist theorists and her strong orientation toward humanistic scholarship. Subsequently, she introduced a second generation of European Documentation and incorporated humanistic methods and concerns, particularly semiotics and cultural studies, into the field of information science.

Although Briet had been highly regarded throughout much of her career—the Grand Cross of the Légion d'honneur was conferred on her in 1950—she was largely forgotten in her later life, until her death in 1989, when scholars such as Mary Niles Maack found a renewed interest in her ideas. Today scholars often credit Briet as a visionary, having laid the foundation for contemporary frameworks and methodologies in information science roughly 50 years earlier. "Her modernist perspective," writes Michael Buckland, "combined with semiotics, deserves attention now because it is different from, and offers an alternative to, the scientific, positivist view that has so dominated information science and which is increasingly questioned."

== Early life ==
Suzanne Briet was born in Paris, France, on 1 February 1894, coming of age at a time of great social change and economic loss in France after World War I. Although Briet grew up in Paris, she remained attached to her birthplace and ancestral home. Briet was only 20 at the outbreak of the war. Ardennes was the pathway of German armies invading France, and during the hostilities her uncle was deported, his village was invaded, and her grandfather's house was destroyed. Historians have suggested that perhaps because of her experiences during the war, as well as her travels to England as a child, Briet took an early interest in the League of Nations, sitting in on some of the sessions held in Paris, and the founding of other international organizations. Briet's mother expected her to become a teacher. Briet's family sent her to Ecole de Sèvres, an elite women's school for training secondary school teachers, where she earned a degree in history and qualified to teach English and history. After teaching in Algeria from 1917 to 1920, Briet pursued a career in librarianship. She studied with Louis Barrau-Dihigo at the Sorbonne, who was apparently so taken with Briet's talents that "when Briet explained that she could only participate on Saturday, he changed the time of the course to accommodate her." At age 30 in 1924, Briet was one of the first of three women appointed as professional librarians at the Bibliothèque nationale de France.

== Career ==
Briet's career at the Bibliothèque Nationale witnessed major changes in the library profession. Briet played a central role in the "modern library" movement, which eschewed elitist traditions that had dominated many libraries in favor of "modern" ideas of librarianship. In addition to technological innovations, Briet saw the emergence of documentation as a distinct profession with its own techniques, standards and training. Women also entered the professional classes in France in increasing numbers during World War II, growing from only 10% of the library profession in 1927 to 50% by the end of the war. Her main achievements during these years were symbolic of her interest in service and modernization. Between 1934 and 1954, Briet created and supervised the Salle des Catalogues et Bibliographies, making available materials throughout France that had been previously restricted to most patrons. By 1931 she co-founded (with chemist Jean Gérard) the Union Française des Organismes de Documentation, the French analogue of the American Documentation Institute (today known as the American Society for Information Science and Technology).

During World War II, Briet witnessed many of her colleagues deported during the German occupation of Paris and others arrested as communists. Despite "a climate of fear, censorship, oppression and physical hardship," Briet made sure to carry out the catalog and bibliographic services of the Bibliothèque Nationale. During the war, Briet continued her interest in documentation, even attending a conference in Salzburg, Germany, which was organized by German Documentalists.

At the end of the war, Briet took on a larger role in a growing international documentation movement. In 1950, she prepared an international survey of education for librarians and documentalists commissioned by UNESCO and was awarded the Légion d'honneur. In 1951 Briet helped establish the Institut National de Techniques de la Documentation at the Conservatoire National des Arts et Métiers. She was the founding Director of Studies and eventually the Vice-President of the International Federation for Documentation.

That same year, Briet published her treatise Qu'est-ce que la documentation?, in which she outlines, in forty-eight pages, her philosophy of documentation, "pushing boundaries of the field beyond texts to include any material form of evidence. ('Is a living animal a document?' she asked.)" Her thirty-year career at the Bibliothèque Nationale often put Briet in close contact with major French thinkers of the day, including scientists, historians, linguists, and philosophers, which had a significant impact on her philosophy.

Briet retired from the Bibliothèque Nationale in 1954 at age 60. She wrote her last essays on documentation in 1955. She spent her retirement concentrating on other interests, including the history of Ardennes and the poet Arthur Rimbaud. Her memoirs were published in 1979. She died in Boulogne in 1989.

== Impact on information science ==
Briet published roughly 100 essays, books, and reports on documentation, library science, and history. She took up many of the pressing issues of documentation in her day: internationalization, institutionalization, information or documentary overload, scholarly communication, science and technology studies, world peace, and international development. Briet had been deeply engaged in the documentation movement from the 1920s onward, bringing to it a deep understanding of culture and the humanities. Expanding on the techniques and technological ideas of earlier European Documentalists, such as Paul Otlet and Henri La Fontaine, "Briet understood that technology and culture were deeply connected. She saw society and, therefore, culture, as being re-shaped by technology. The techniques of documentation in aiding and shaping intellectual work were, in her view, both a symptom of, and contributing force within the 'industrialization' of knowledge workers. We can now see, in the impact of computers and telecommunications, how right she was." As Ronald Day notes, "Not again—until Actor Network Theory at the end of the twentieth century—would a social network account of technical production, and specifically, documentary production, be articulated."

Briet's body of work points to the necessity to understand cultural categories, historical lineages, and the social forces that create and sustain information, urging scholars and information professionals to explore beyond the boundaries of their cultural specialization. Paul Otlet problematized the definition of document when he opened the possibility of any object, independent of the human intention behind its creation, to be a considered a document. Briet solves this problem with her argument that a document must be defined by its intentional use as such. She gives the example of an antelope—running wild in the plains, it is not a document, but captured and placed in the zoo of the Jardin des Plantes, it becomes an object of study and thus a document. It operates, as Briet says it must, as “evidence in support of a fact”. An object's treatment as evidence is contingent not only on its own properties but on its very framing as a source of information. It must be organized into a meaningful relationship with other evidence in order to have the indexical power of evidence.

According to scholar Jonathan Furner, "One of Briet's most important insights was that individual documents may be interpreted in different ways by different people wishing to put them to different uses for different purposes. This variability of interpretation is characteristic of documents even at the level of individual words, and the different decisions made by different translators at the word level can have significant consequences."

Briet developed the notion of indice (literally "index") as not only pointing to an object but also reflective of the networks in which that object appears as a named thing, leading to a semiotics-inspired definition of "document." Furthermore, Briet argued that techniques and technologies are expressions of a networked culture. Ronald Day explains the idea this way: "Information and communication technologies may introduce a 'new rhythm' to society and culture, but they themselves are a 'symptom' of Western social development." Thus, technique and technology are historically specific and symptomatic of culture. Briet argues that documentation must respond by incorporating these symptoms and specificities of Western culture but also must incorporate "Western modernity's opposite trend toward global expansion."

Briet also saw knowledge as embedded and emergent in cultural and social production and saw modernity as the growth of networks of knowledge. Indeed, in an increasingly globalized world, Briet argued for documentation to take up the call of material necessity rather than be put into the service of culture or any one culture; that is, "documentation marks the importance of particular, more 'localized' or specialized cultures in terms of their material needs, their specialized vocabularies, and the techniques and technologies needed to provide documentary services to these groups."

== Select bibliography ==
- Briet, Suzanne.(1960). Le maréchal de Schulemberg, Jean III, comte de Montdejeux, 1598-1671. Mezières: Éditions de la Société d'études ardennaises.
- Briet, Suzanne.(1967). Madame Rimbaud, essai de biographie, suivi de la correspondance de Vitalie Rimbaud-Cuif dont treize lettres inédites. Paris: Lettres modernes, Minard. ISBN 978-0320050848
- Briet, Suzanne.(1956). Rimbaud notre prochain. Paris: Nouvelles Éditions latines.
- Briet, Suzanne.(1951). Qu'est-ce que la documentation? Paris: Éditions documentaires, industrielles et techniques.

== See also ==
- Document
- Documentation science
