= Mary Niles Maack =

American librarian and scholar (1945–2023)

- Maack in the 1970s
- Born: December, 1945; Paris, Illinois
- Died: January 23, 2023 (aged 77)
- Occupations: librarian, scholar

Mary Niles Maack (December 1945 – January 23, 2023) was an American librarian and scholar known for her work on comparative librarianship and the history of the book.

== Early life and education ==
Maack was born in Paris, Illinois in 1945 to Augustus and Lillie Niles. She graduated with a degree in history from the University of Illinois Urbana-Champaign and earned her master's degree and Doctorate of Library Science from Columbia University.

== Career ==
Maack did her doctoral research in West Africa which resulted in her first book, Libraries in Senegal. She worked at New York Public Library.

She was a tenured professor at the University of Minnesota for ten years and later at UCLA in the Department of Information Studies beginning in 1986. She served as a Fulbright Professor at the French National Library School (Ecole Nationale Supérieure des Bibliothèques) in Villeurbanne from 1982 to 1983 and received grants to do research at the Bibliothèque Nationale. She lectured and consulted internationally in North America, Europe, and Africa.

She was the head of the head of the California Center for the Book and the author of a collection of essays about John Y. Cole, the founding director of the Center for the Book at the Library of Congress.

Maack's work often focused on gender issues. Her research on the decrease of women faculty in LIS programs in the United States raised awareness of the tension between technological change and the historical role of women in librarianship. She wrote in 2002 that she felt that "library feminism is alive and... feminist librarians are still engaged in the struggle for equalization in one profession." Her published papers, Women in Library Education: Down the Up Staircase and Toward a History of Women in Librarianship: A Critical Analysis with Suggestions for Further Research examined the relationship between feminization and professionalism within librarianship.

== Honors and awards ==
- Justin Winsor Prize of the American Library Association Library History Round Table in 1981
- Jesse Shera Award from the American Library Association Library Research Round Table in 1992.
- The UCLA Department of Information Studies Distinguished Teaching Award in 2005.
- Feminist and Global Perspectives on an Evolving Profession: Papers Honoring Mary Niles Maack, edited by Michèle Cloonan and Suzanne M. Stauffer. Library Trends 72 (February, 2024).

== Publications ==
- Libraries in Senegal: continuity and change in an emerging nation (1981) ISBN 0838903215
- Feminization Of Librarianship In France: A Silent Revolution (1987) ISBN 0669063681
- Maack, Mary Niles and Joanne Ellen Passet. (1994). Aspirations and Mentoring in an Academic Environment : Women Faculty in Library and Information Science. Westport Conn: Greenwood Press.ISBN 0313278369
- Maack, Mary Niles (1994). "Public Libraries in Transition: Ideals, Strategies, and Research". Libraries & Culture. 29 (1): 75–94. ISSN 0894-8631. JSTOR 25542622.
- Maack, M. N. (2000). International dimensions of library history: Leadership and scholarship, 1978-1998. Libraries & Culture, 35(1),
- “The Lady and the Antelope: Suzanne Briet’s Contribution to the French Documentation Movement.” Library Trends 52, no. 4 (2004): 719–47.
- “American Bookwomen in Paris during the 1920s.” (2005) Libraries & Culture 40 (3): 399–415.
- “‘I Cannot Get Along Without the Books I Find Here’: The American Library in Paris During the War, Occupation, and Liberation, 1939-1945.” Library Trends 55, no. 3 (2007): 490–512. https://doi.org/10.1353/lib.2007.0013.
- Encyclopedia of Library and Information Sciences (ed. 2009) ISBN 084939712X
- The Library of Congress and the Center for the Book: Historical Essays in Honor of John Y. Cole (ed. 2011) ISBN 9780844495255
- Anne Morgan: Photography, Philanthropy and Advocacy (2016) ISBN 0692566023
