= Michael Buckland =

Michael Keeble Buckland
- Born: November 23, 1941 (age 84)
- Occupations: Librarian, Information science professor

Academic background
- Education: University of Sheffield (Ph.D., 1972)
- Thesis: Library Stock Control (1972)

Academic work
- Discipline: Library and information science
- Institutions: UC Berkeley School of Information

Michael Keeble Buckland (born 1941) is an information scientist and emeritus professor at the School of Information, University of California, Berkeley. His research focuses on information, culture, and society; library services; bibliography and discovery; and the history and theory of documentation.

== Education and Career ==
=== Education and Early Career ===
Buckland was born and raised in England. After studying history at the University of Oxford, he began his library career as a trainee at the Bodleian Library.

He received his professional qualification in librarianship from the University of Sheffield in 1965 and joined the staff of the University of Lancaster Library the same year, one year after the university was founded. From 1967 to 1972, he was responsible for the University of Lancaster Library Research Unit, where a series of studies were conducted on book usage, book availability, and library management simulations.

In 1972, Buckland received his PhD from the University of Sheffield. His doctoral dissertation, Library Stock Control, was later published as Book Availability and the Library User (Pergamon, 1975).

=== Career in the US ===
In 1972, Buckland moved to the United States to Purdue University Libraries, where he was assistant director of libraries for technical services. In 1976, Michael Buckland joined the School of Information at UC Berkeley and worked as dean from 1976 to 1984. During his service, he oversaw the school’s transition to the School of Library and Information Studies. From 1983 to 1987, he served as assistant vice president for library plans and policies for the nine campuses of the University of California. In 1988, he returned to the school as a professor. He has been a visiting professor in Austria, Australia and Sweden.

After his retirement in 2004, Buckland has continued to contribute to the worldwide community of information and library science. From 1991 to 2025, he co-hosted his Information Access Seminar series with Clifford Lynch every Friday afternoon. He remains academically active and continues to teach and publish.

== Contributions ==
Buckland's interests include library services, information retrieval, cultural heritage, and the historical development of information management. Buckland is one of the most heavily cited authors in library and information science.

=== Theoretical Foundation ===
Michael Buckland's most influential contribution to information science is his reconceptualization of information itself. In his seminal 1991 paper Information as Thing, Buckland distinguishes between three meanings of information: information-as-process (the act of informing), information-as-knowledge (what is perceived in information-as-process), and information-as-thing (physical objects that are informative). This framework provides clarity to a field often plagued by terminological ambiguity and remains foundational to information science discourse.

Closely related to this work is his 1997 paper, What is a Document?, which expands the concept of documents beyond traditional textual materials. Drawing on the work of Suzanne Briet, Buckland argues that any informative object—including museum specimens such as preserved birds—can function as a document.

=== Historical Scholarship ===
Buckland makes significant contributions to the history of information science, tracing the development of documentation movements, bibliography, and information management practices. His work highlights the influence of pioneers, including Suzanne Briet, Emanuel Goldberg, Lodewyk Bendikson, and Robert Pagès, drawing renewed attention to European documentation traditions.

Recognized as a leading figure in Neo-Documentation, Buckland co-founded the Document Academy with Niels Windfeld Lund and W. Boyd Rayward. The organization continues to thrive until now.

=== Major Publications ===
==== BOOKS ====
- Buckland, Michael. 1983. Library Services in Theory and Context. Oxford: Pergamon.
- Buckland, Michael. 1988. Library Services in Theory and Context. 2nd ed. Oxford: Pergamon.
- Buckland, Michael. 1991. Information and Information Systems. New York: Praeger.
- Buckland, Michael. 1992. Redesigning Library Services. Chicago: American Library Association.
- Buckland, Michael. 2006. Emanuel Goldberg and his Knowledge Machine. Westport, CT: Libraries Unlimited.
- Buckland, Michael. 2017. Information and Society. Cambridge, MA: MIT Press.
- Buckland, Michael. 2021. Ideology and Libraries: California, Diplomacy, and Occupied Japan, 1945–1952. Lanham, MD: Rowman & Littlefield.

==== ARTICLES ====
- Buckland, Michael K. "Information as thing." Journal of the American Society for Information Science 42, no. 5 (1991): 351-360.
- Buckland, Michael K. "What is a “document”?." Journal of the American Society for Information Science 48, no. 9 (1997): 804-809.
- Buckland, Michael. "What kind of science can information science be?." Journal of the American Society for Information Science and Technology 63, no. 1 (2012): 1-7.

== Professional Services ==
- 1998: President of the Association for Information Science and Technology (ASIS&T)
- 2000–present: Co-Director of the Electronic Cultural Atlas Initiative.

== Awards ==
- 2012: Award of Merit, ASIS&T
- 2014: Frederick G. Kilgour Award for Research in Library and Information Technology, the Library & Information Technology Association (LITA), jointly sponsored by OCLC
- 2015: Distinguished Lecture Series Award, the New Jersey Chapter of ASIS&T
- 2017: Information as Thing, Best JASIST Paper of the Decades (Best paper overall & 1990s), ASIS&T
- 2017: What Kind of Science Can Information Science Be?, Best JASIST Paper of the Decades (2010s), ASIS&T
- 2018: Information and Society, Best Information Science Book Award, ASIS&T
- 2021: California Library Hall of Fame, California Library Association
- 2024: Emeritus of the Year Award, UC Berkeley
