= Information science =

Academic field concerned with collection and analysis of information

Visualization of various methodological approaches to gaining insights from meta data areas

Information science (abbreviated as infosci) is an academic field that is primarily concerned with the analysis, collection, classification, manipulation, storage, retrieval, movement, dissemination, and protection of information. Practitioners within and outside the field engage in the study of knowledge application and usage in organizations. Additionally, they examine the interaction between people, organizations, and any existing information systems. The objective of this study is to create, replace, improve, or understand the information systems.

== Disciplines and related fields ==
Historically, information science has evolved as a transdisciplinary field, both drawing from and contributing to diverse domains.

=== Core foundations ===
- Technical and computational: informatics, computer science, data science, network science, information theory, discrete mathematics, statistics and analytics
- Information organization: library science, archival science, documentation science, knowledge representation, ontologies, organization studies
- Human dimensions: human-computer interaction, cognitive psychology, information behavior, social epistemology, philosophy of information, information ethics and science and technology studies

=== Applied contexts ===
Information science methodologies are applied across numerous domains, reflecting the discipline's versatility and relevance. Key application areas include:

- Health and life sciences: health informatics, bioinformatics
- Cultural and social contexts: digital humanities, computational social science, social media analytics, social informatics, computational linguistics
- Spatial information: geographic information science, environmental informatics
- Organizational settings: knowledge management, business analytics, decision support systems, information economics
- Security and governance: cybersecurity, intelligence analysis, information policy, IT law, legal informatics
- Education and learning: educational technology, learning analytics

The interdisciplinary nature of information science continues to expand as new technological developments and social practices emerge, creating innovative research frontiers that bridge traditional disciplinary boundaries.

== Foundations ==
=== Scope and approach ===
Information science focuses on understanding problems from the perspective of the stakeholders involved and then applying information and other technologies as needed. In other words, it tackles systemic problems first rather than individual pieces of technology within that system. In this respect, one can see information science as a response to technological determinism, the belief that technology "develops by its own laws, that it realizes its own potential, limited only by the material resources available and the creativity of its developers. It must therefore be regarded as an autonomous system controlling and ultimately permeating all other subsystems of society."

Many universities have entire colleges, departments or schools devoted to the study of information science, while numerous information-science scholars work in disciplines such as communication, healthcare, computer science, law, and sociology. Several institutions have formed an I-School Caucus (see List of I-Schools), but numerous others besides these also have comprehensive information specializations.

Within information science, current issues as of 2013 include:

- Human–computer interaction for science
- Groupware
- The Semantic Web
- Value sensitive design
- Iterative design processes
- The ways people generate, use and find information

=== Definitions ===
The first known usage of the term "information science" was in 1955. An early definition of Information science (going back to 1968, the year when the American Documentation Institute renamed itself as the American Society for Information Science and Technology) states:

"Information science is that discipline that investigates the properties and behavior of information, the forces governing the flow of information, and the means of processing information for optimum accessibility and usability. It is concerned with that body of knowledge relating to the origination, collection, organization, storage, retrieval, interpretation, transmission, transformation, and utilization of information. This includes the authenticity of information representations in both natural and artificial systems, the use of codes for efficient message transmission, and the study of information processing devices and techniques such as computers and their programming systems. It is an interdisciplinary science derived from and related to such fields as mathematics, logic, linguistics, psychology, computer technology, operations research, the graphic arts, communications, management, and other similar fields. It has both a pure science component, which inquires into the subject without regard to its application, and an applied science component, which develops services and products." (Borko 1968, p. 3).

==== Related terms ====
Some authors use informatics as a synonym for information science. This is especially true when related to the concept developed by A. I. Mikhailov and other Soviet authors in the mid-1960s. The Mikhailov school saw informatics as a discipline related to the study of scientific information. Informatics is difficult to precisely define because of the rapidly evolving and interdisciplinary nature of the field. Definitions reliant on the nature of the tools used for deriving meaningful information from data are emerging in Informatics academic programs.

Regional differences and international terminology complicate the problem. Some people note that much of what is called "Informatics" today was once called "Information Science" – at least in fields such as Medical Informatics. For example, when library scientists also began to use the phrase "Information Science" to refer to their work, the term "informatics" emerged:

- in the United States as a response by computer scientists to distinguish their work from that of library science
- in Britain as a term for a science of information that studies natural, as well as artificial or engineered, information-processing systems

Another term discussed as a synonym for "information studies" is "information systems". Brian Campbell Vickery's Information Systems (1973) placed information systems within IS. Ellis, Allen & Wilson (1999), on the other hand, provided a bibliometric investigation describing the relation between two different fields: "information science" and "information systems".

=== Philosophy of information ===
Philosophy of information studies conceptual issues arising at the intersection of psychology, computer science, information technology, and philosophy. It includes the investigation of the conceptual nature and basic principles of information, including its dynamics, utilisation and sciences, as well as the elaboration and application of information-theoretic and computational methodologies to its philosophical problems. Robert Hammarberg pointed out that there is no coherent distinction between information and data: "an Information Processing System (IPS) cannot process data except in terms of whatever representational language is inherent to it, [so] data could not even be apprehended by an IPS without becoming representational in nature, and thus losing their status of being raw, brute, facts."

=== Ontology ===
In science and information science, an ontology formally represents knowledge as a set of concepts within a domain, and the relationships between those concepts. It can be used to reason about the entities within that domain and may be used to describe the domain.

More specifically, an ontology is a model for describing the world that consists of a set of types, properties, and relationship types. Exactly what is provided around these varies, but they are the essentials of an ontology. There is also generally an expectation that there be a close resemblance between the real world and the features of the model in an ontology.

In theory, an ontology is a "formal, explicit specification of a shared conceptualisation". An ontology renders shared vocabulary and taxonomy which models a domain with the definition of objects and/or concepts and their properties and relations.

Ontologies are the structural frameworks for organizing information and are used in artificial intelligence, the Semantic Web, systems engineering, software engineering, biomedical informatics, library science, enterprise bookmarking, and information architecture as a form of knowledge representation about the world or some part of it. The creation of domain ontologies is also essential to the definition and use of an enterprise architecture framework.

=== Science or discipline? ===
Authors such as Ingwersen argue that informatology has problems defining its own boundaries with other disciplines. According to Popper "Information science operates busily on an ocean of commonsense practical applications, which increasingly involve the computer ... and on commonsense views of language, of communication, of knowledge and Information, computer science is in little better state". Other authors, such as Furner, deny that information science is a true science.

== Careers ==
=== Information scientist ===
An information scientist is an individual, usually with a relevant subject degree or high level of subject knowledge, who provides focused information to scientific and technical research staff in industry or to subject faculty and students in academia. The industry *information specialist/scientist* and the academic information subject specialist/librarian have, in general, similar subject background training, but the academic position holder will be required to hold a second advanced degree—e.g. Master of Library Science (MLS), Military Intelligence (MI), Master of Arts (MA)—in information and library studies in addition to a subject master's. The title also applies to an individual carrying out research in information science.

=== Systems analyst ===
A systems analyst works on creating, designing, and improving information systems for a specific need. Often systems analysts work with one or more businesses to evaluate and implement organizational processes and techniques for accessing information in order to improve efficiency and productivity within the organization(s).

=== Information professional ===
An information professional is an individual who preserves, organizes, and disseminates information. Information professionals are skilled in the organization and retrieval of recorded knowledge. Traditionally, their work has been with print materials, but these skills are being increasingly used with electronic, visual, audio, and digital materials. Information professionals work in a variety of public, private, non-profit, and academic institutions. Information professionals can also be found within organisational and industrial contexts, and are performing roles that include system design and development and system analysis.

== History ==
=== Early beginnings ===
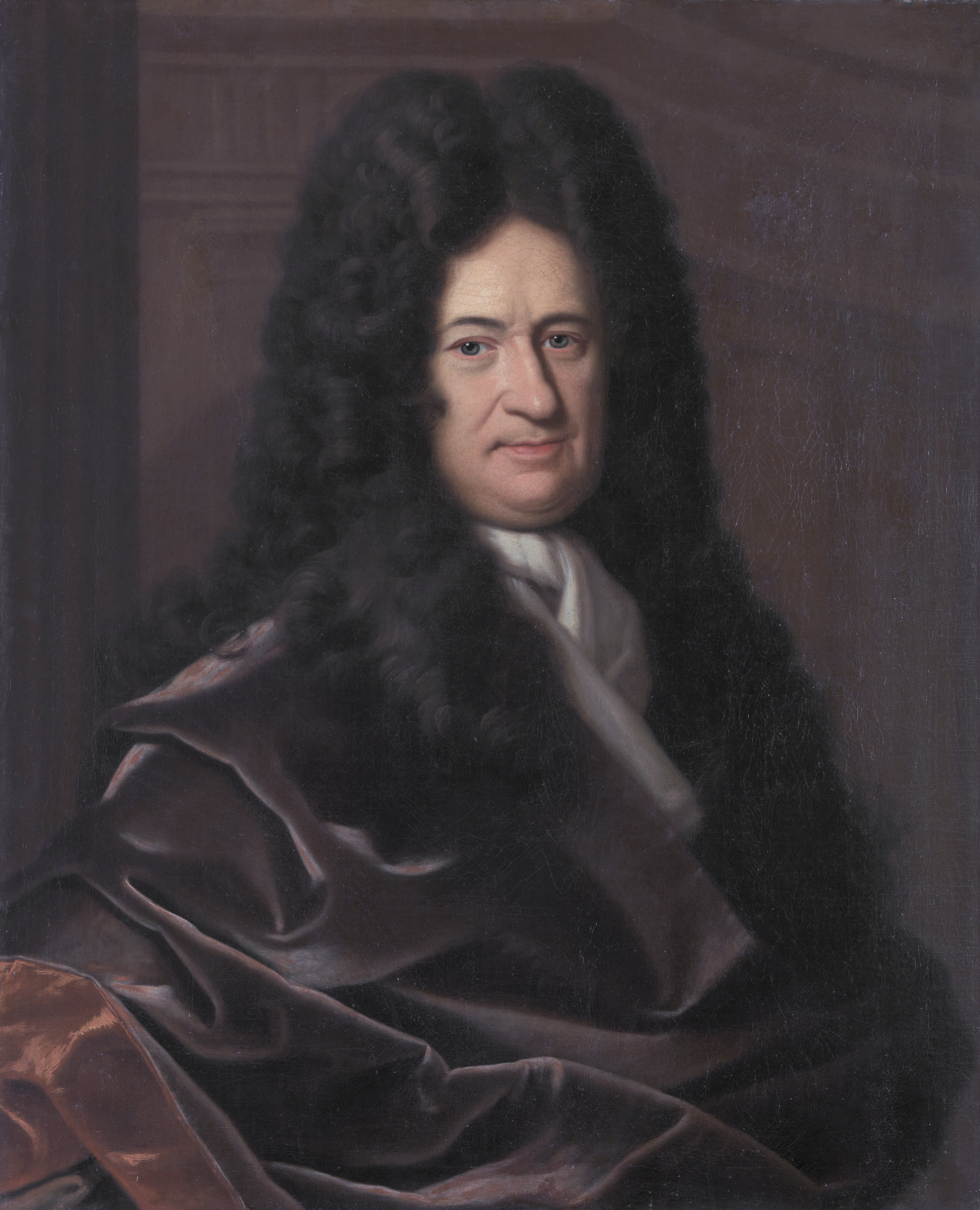
Gottfried Wilhelm Leibniz, a German polymath who wrote primarily in Latin and French. His fields of study were Metaphysics, Mathematics, Theodicy.

Information science, in studying the collection, classification, manipulation, storage, retrieval and dissemination of information has origins in the common stock of human knowledge. Information analysis has been carried out by scholars at least as early as the time of the Assyrian Empire with the emergence of cultural depositories, what is today known as libraries and archives. Institutionally, information science emerged in the 19th century along with many other social science disciplines. As a science, however, it finds its institutional roots in the history of science, beginning with publication of the first issues of Philosophical Transactions, generally considered the first scientific journal, in 1665 by the Royal Society.

The institutionalization of science occurred throughout the 18th century. In 1731, Benjamin Franklin established the Library Company of Philadelphia, the first library owned by a group of public citizens, which quickly expanded beyond the realm of books and became a center of scientific experimentation, and which hosted public exhibitions of scientific experiments. Benjamin Franklin invested a town in Massachusetts with a collection of books that the town voted to make available to all free of charge, forming the first public library of the United States. Academie de Chirurgia (Paris) published Memoires pour les Chirurgiens, generally considered to be the first medical journal, in 1736. The American Philosophical Society, patterned on the Royal Society (London), was founded in Philadelphia in 1743. As numerous other scientific journals and societies were founded, Alois Senefelder developed the concept of lithography for use in mass printing work in Germany in 1796.

=== 19th century ===
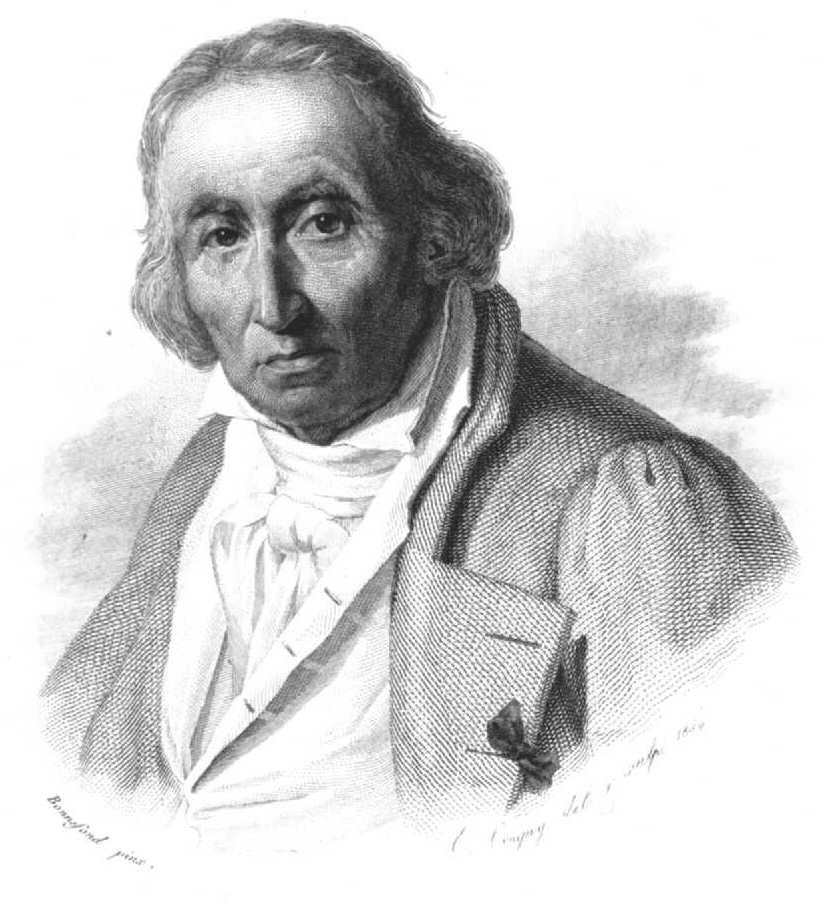
Joseph Marie Jacquard

By the 19th century the first signs of information science emerged as separate and distinct from other sciences and social sciences but in conjunction with communication and computation. In 1801, Joseph Marie Jacquard invented a punched card system to control operations of the cloth weaving loom in France. It was the first use of "memory storage of patterns" system. As chemistry journals emerged throughout the 1820s and 1830s, Charles Babbage developed his "difference engine", the first step towards the modern computer, in 1822 and his "analytical engine" by 1834. By 1843 Richard Hoe developed the rotary press, and in 1844 Samuel Morse sent the first public telegraph message. By 1848 William F. Poole begins the Index to Periodical Literature, the first general periodical literature index in the US.

In 1854 George Boole published An Investigation into Laws of Thought..., which lays the foundations for Boolean algebra, which is later used in information retrieval. In 1860 a congress was held at Karlsruhe Technische Hochschule to discuss the feasibility of establishing a systematic and rational nomenclature for chemistry. The congress did not reach any conclusive results, but several key participants returned home with Stanislao Cannizzaro's outline (1858), which ultimately convinces them of the validity of his scheme for calculating atomic weights.

By 1865, the Smithsonian Institution began a catalog of current scientific papers, which became the International Catalogue of Scientific Papers in 1902. The following year the Royal Society began publication of its Catalogue of Papers in London. In 1868, Christopher Sholes, Carlos Glidden, and S. W. Soule produced the first practical typewriter. By 1872 Lord Kelvin devised an analogue computer to predict the tides, and by 1875 Frank Stephen Baldwin was granted the first US patent for a practical calculating machine that performs four arithmetic functions. Alexander Graham Bell and Thomas Edison invented the telephone and phonograph in 1876 and 1877 respectively, and the American Library Association was founded in Philadelphia. In 1879 Index Medicus was first issued by the Library of the Surgeon General, U.S. Army, with John Shaw Billings as librarian, and later the library issues Index Catalogue, which achieved an international reputation as the most complete catalog of medical literature.

=== European documentation ===
The discipline of documentation science, which marks the earliest theoretical foundations of modern information science, emerged in the late part of the 19th century in Europe together with several more scientific indexes whose purpose was to organize scholarly literature. Many information science historians cite Paul Otlet and Henri La Fontaine as the fathers of information science with the founding of the International Institute of Bibliography (IIB) in 1895. A second generation of European Documentalists emerged after the Second World War, most notably Suzanne Briet. However, "information science" as a term is not popularly used in academia until sometime in the latter part of the 20th century.

Documentalists emphasized the utilitarian integration of technology and technique toward specific social goals. According to Ronald Day, "As an organized system of techniques and technologies, documentation was understood as a player in the historical development of global organization in modernity – indeed, a major player inasmuch as that organization was dependent on the organization and transmission of information." Otlet and Lafontaine (who won the Nobel Prize in 1913) not only envisioned later technical innovations but also projected a global vision for information and information technologies that speaks directly to postwar visions of a global "information society". Otlet and Lafontaine established numerous organizations dedicated to standardization, bibliography, international associations, and consequently, international cooperation. These organizations were fundamental for ensuring international production in commerce, information, communication and modern economic development, and they later found their global form in such institutions as the League of Nations and the United Nations. Otlet designed the Universal Decimal Classification, based on Melvil Dewey's decimal classification system.

Although he lived decades before computers and networks emerged, what he discussed prefigured what ultimately became the World Wide Web. His vision of a great network of knowledge focused on documents and included the notions of hyperlinks, search engines, remote access, and social networks.

Otlet not only imagined that all the world's knowledge should be interlinked and made available remotely to anyone, but he also proceeded to build a structured document collection. This collection involved standardized paper sheets and cards filed in custom-designed cabinets according to a hierarchical index (which culled information worldwide from diverse sources) and a commercial information retrieval service (which answered written requests by copying relevant information from index cards). Users of this service were even warned if their query was likely to produce more than 50 results per search. By 1937 documentation had formally been institutionalized, as evidenced by the founding of the American Documentation Institute (ADI), later called the American Society for Information Science and Technology.

=== Transition to modern information science ===
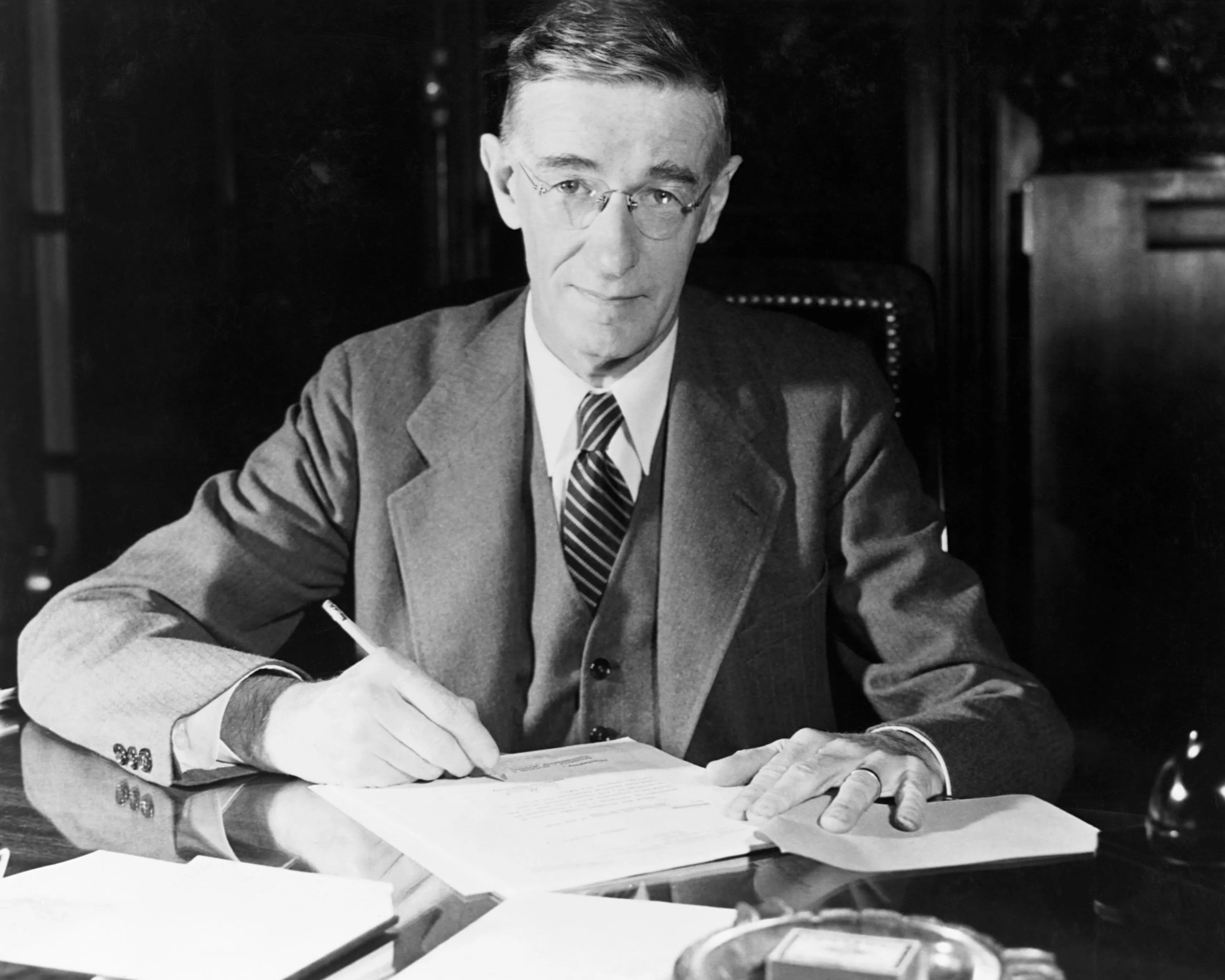
Vannevar Bush, a famous information scientist, c. 1940–1944

With the 1950s came increasing awareness of the potential of automatic devices for literature searching and information storage and retrieval. As these concepts grew in magnitude and potential, so did the variety of information science interests. By the 1960s and 70s, there was a move from batch processing to online modes, from mainframe to mini and microcomputers. Additionally, traditional boundaries among disciplines began to fade and many information science scholars joined with other programs. They further made themselves multidisciplinary by incorporating disciplines in the sciences, humanities and social sciences, as well as other professional programs, such as law and medicine in their curriculum.

Among the individuals who had distinct opportunities to facilitate interdisciplinary activity targeted at scientific communication was Foster E. Mohrhardt, director of the National Agricultural Library from 1954 to 1968.

By the 1980s, large databases, such as Grateful Med at the National Library of Medicine, and user-oriented services such as Dialog and Compuserve, were for the first time accessible by individuals from their personal computers. The 1980s also saw the emergence of numerous special interest groups to respond to the changes. By the end of the decade, special interest groups were available involving non-print media, social sciences, energy and the environment, and community information systems. Today, information science largely examines technical bases, social consequences, and theoretical understanding of online databases, widespread use of databases in government, industry, and education, and the development of the Internet and World Wide Web.

== Information dissemination in the 21st century ==
=== Changing definition ===
Dissemination has historically been interpreted as unilateral communication of information. With the advent of the internet, and the explosion in popularity of online communities, social media has changed the information landscape in many respects, and creates both new modes of communication and new types of information", changing the interpretation of the definition of dissemination. The nature of social networks allows for faster diffusion of information than through organizational sources. The internet has changed the way we view, use, create, and store information; now it is time to re-evaluate the way we share and spread it.

=== Impact of social media on people and industry ===
Social media networks provide an open information environment for people who have limited time or access to traditional outlets of information diffusion, creating an "increasingly mobile and social world [that] demands...new types of information skills". Social media integration as an access point can be a useful and mutually beneficial tool for users and providers. All major news providers have visibility and an access point through networks such as Facebook and Twitter, maximizing their breadth of audience. Through social media, users are directed to provide and engage with information from people they know. The ability to share, vote, and comment on content increases its reach farther and wider than traditional methods- as people tend to include others in their circle of knowledge or solicit their opinion. Sharing through social media has become so influential that publishers must appeal to their online audience if they desire to succeed, as changes in the public opinion expressed on major social networking sites can have a lasting impact on engagement. It is often mutually beneficial for publishers and social networks to promote new content to improve both user base experiences. Social media allows interaction through easily accessible tools; The Wall Street Journal offers an app through Facebook, and The Washington Post offers an independent social app that was downloaded by 19.5 million users in six months, demonstrating the growing demand for this form of information.

=== Social media's power to facilitate topics ===
The connections and networks sustained through social media help information providers learn what is important to people. The connections people have throughout the world enable the exchange of information at an unprecedented rate. It is for this reason that these networks have been realized for the potential they provide. "Most news media monitor Twitter for breaking news", as well as news anchors frequently request the audience to tweet pictures of events. The users and viewers of the shared information have earned "opinion-making and agenda-setting power". This channel has been recognized for the usefulness of providing targeted information based on public demand.

== Research sectors and applications ==
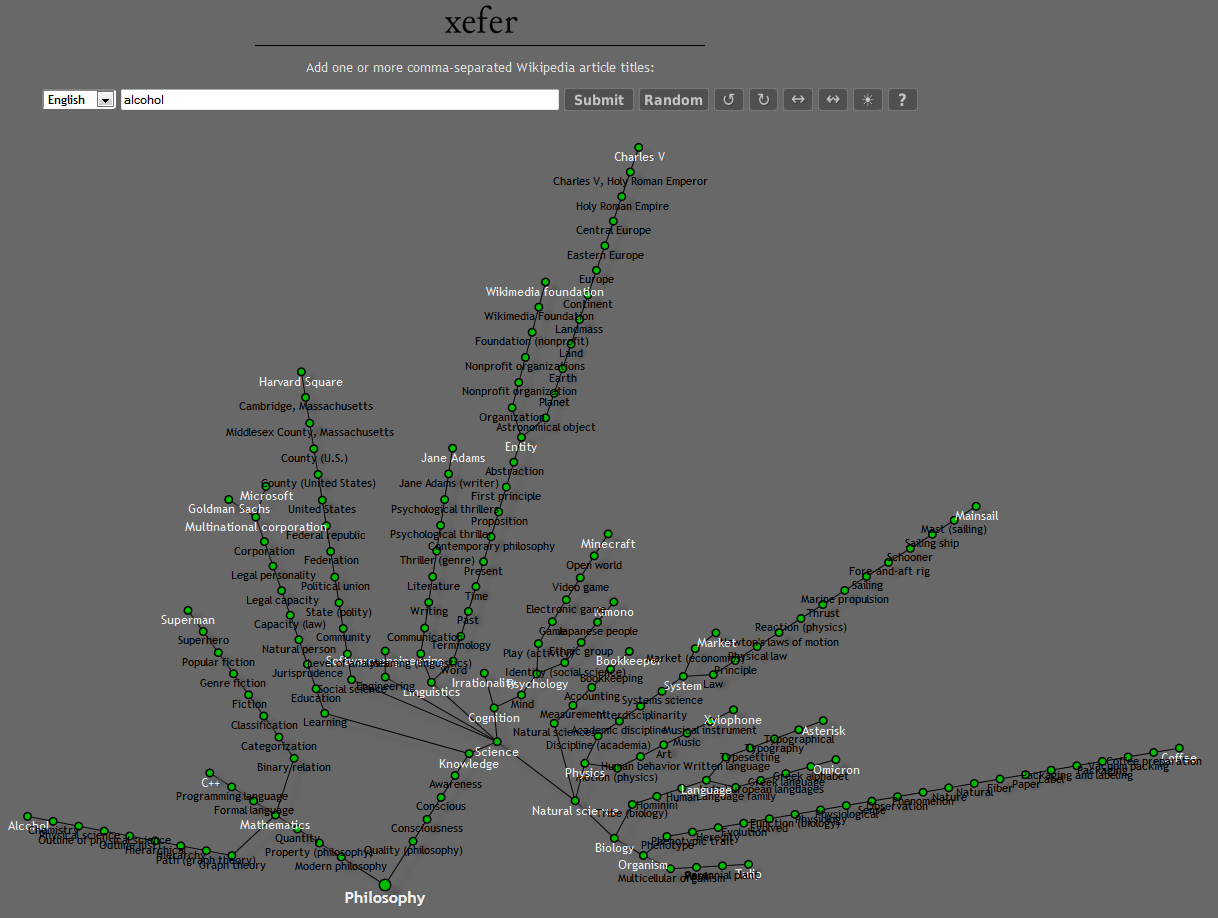
This graph shows links between Wikipedia articles. Information science includes studying how topics relate to each other, and how readers relate concepts to each other.

The following areas are some of those that information science investigates and develops.

=== Information access ===
Information access is an area of research at the intersection of Informatics, Information Science, Information Security, Language Technology, and Computer Science. The objectives of information access research are to automate the processing of large and unwieldy amounts of information and to simplify users' access to it. What about assigning privileges and restricting access to unauthorized users? The extent of access should be defined in the level of clearance granted for the information. Applicable technologies include information retrieval, text mining, text editing, machine translation, and text categorisation. In discussion, information access is often defined as concerning the insurance of free and closed or public access to information and is brought up in discussions on copyright, patent law, and public domain. Public libraries need resources to provide knowledge of information assurance.

=== Information architecture ===
Information architecture (IA) is the art and science of organizing and labelling websites, intranets, online communities and software to support usability. It is an emerging discipline and community of practice focused on bringing together principles of design and architecture to the digital landscape. Typically it involves a model or concept of information which is used and applied to activities that require explicit details of complex information systems. These activities include library systems and database development.

=== Information management ===
Information management (IM) is the collection and management of information from one or more sources and the distribution of that information to one or more audiences. This sometimes involves those who have a stake in, or a right to that information. Management means the organization of and control over the structure, processing and delivery of information. Throughout the 1970s this was largely limited to files, file maintenance, and the life cycle management of paper-based files, other media and records. With the proliferation of information technology starting in the 1970s, the job of information management took on a new light and also began to include the field of data maintenance.

=== Information retrieval ===
Information retrieval (IR) is the area of study concerned with searching for documents, for information within documents, and for metadata about documents, as well as that of searching structured storage, relational databases, and the World Wide Web. Automated information retrieval systems are used to reduce what has been called "information overload". Many universities and public libraries use IR systems to provide access to books, journals and other documents. Web search engines are the most visible IR applications.

An information retrieval process begins when a user enters a query into the system. Queries are formal statements of information needs, for example search strings in web search engines. In information retrieval a query does not uniquely identify a single object in the collection. Instead, several objects may match the query, perhaps with different degrees of relevancy.

An object is an entity that is represented by information in a database. User queries are matched against the database information. Depending on the application the data objects may be, for example, text documents, images, audio, mind maps or videos. Often the documents themselves are not kept or stored directly in the IR system, but are instead represented in the system by document surrogates or metadata.

Most IR systems compute a numeric score on how well each object in the database match the query, and rank the objects according to this value. The top ranking objects are then shown to the user. The process may then be iterated if the user wishes to refine the query.

=== Information seeking ===
Information seeking is the process or activity of attempting to obtain information in both human and technological contexts. Information seeking is related to, but different from, information retrieval (IR).

Much library and information science (LIS) research has focused on the information-seeking practices of practitioners within various fields of professional work. Studies have been carried out into the information-seeking behaviors of librarians, academics, medical professionals, engineers and lawyers (among others). Much of this research has drawn on the work done by Leckie, Pettigrew (now Fisher) and Sylvain, who in 1996 conducted an extensive review of the LIS literature (as well as the literature of other academic fields) on professionals' information seeking. The authors proposed an analytic model of professionals' information seeking behaviour, intended to be generalizable across the professions, thus providing a platform for future research in the area. The model was intended to "prompt new insights... and give rise to more refined and applicable theories of information seeking" (Leckie, Pettigrew & Sylvain 1996, p. 188). The model has been adapted by Wilkinson (2001) who proposes a model of the information seeking of lawyers. Recent studies in this topic address the concept of information-gathering that "provides a broader perspective that adheres better to professionals' work-related reality and desired skills." (Solomon & Bronstein 2021).

=== Information society ===
An information society is a society where the creation, distribution, diffusion, uses, integration and manipulation of information is a significant economic, political, and cultural activity. The aim of an information society is to gain competitive advantage internationally, through using IT in a creative and productive way. The knowledge economy is its economic counterpart, whereby wealth is created through the economic exploitation of understanding. People who have the means to partake in this form of society are sometimes called digital citizens.

Basically, an information society is the means of getting information from one place to another (Wark 1997, p. 22). As technology has become more advanced over time so too has the way we have adapted in sharing this information with each other.

Information society theory discusses the role of information and information technology in society, the question of which key concepts should be used for characterizing contemporary society, and how to define such concepts. It has become a specific branch of contemporary sociology.

=== Knowledge representation and reasoning ===
Knowledge representation (KR) is an area of artificial intelligence research aimed at representing knowledge in symbols to facilitate inferencing from those knowledge elements, creating new elements of knowledge. The KR can be made to be independent of the underlying knowledge model or knowledge base system (KBS) such as a semantic network.

Knowledge Representation (KR) research involves analysis of how to reason accurately and effectively and how best to use a set of symbols to represent a set of facts within a knowledge domain. A symbol vocabulary and a system of logic are combined to enable inferences about elements in the KR to create new KR sentences. Logic is used to supply formal semantics of how reasoning functions should be applied to the symbols in the KR system. Logic is also used to define how operators can process and reshape the knowledge. Examples of operators and operations include, negation, conjunction, adverbs, adjectives, quantifiers and modal operators. The logic is interpretation theory. These elements—symbols, operators, and interpretation theory—are what give sequences of symbols meaning within a KR.

== See also ==
- Computer and information science
- Category:Information science journals
- List of computer science awards § Information science awards
- Outline of information science
- Outline of information technology

== Sources ==
- Borko, H. (1968). "Information science: What is it?". American Documentation. 19 (1). Wiley: 3–5. doi:10.1002/asi.5090190103. ISSN 0096-946X.
- Leckie, Gloria J.; Pettigrew, Karen E.; Sylvain, Christian (1996). "Modeling the information seeking of professionals: A general model derived from research on engineers, health care professionals, and lawyers". Library Quarterly. 66 (2): 161–193. doi:10.1086/602864. S2CID 7829155.
- Wark, McKenzie (1997). The Virtual Republic. Allen & Unwin, St Leonards.
- Wilkinson, Margaret A (2001). "Information sources used by lawyers in problem-solving: An empirical exploration". Library & Information Science Research. 23 (3): 257–276. doi:10.1016/s0740-8188(01)00082-2. S2CID 59067811.
