= Information policy =

Set of laws that regulate information

Information policy is the set of all public laws, regulations, and policies that encourage, discourage, or regulate the creation, use, storage, access, and communication and dissemination of information. The concept encompasses any other decision-making practice with society-wide constitutive efforts that involve the flow of information and how it is processed.

Several fundamental issues that comprise information policy. Most prominent are public policy issues concerned with the use of information for democratization and commercialization of social life. These issues include the digital divide, intellectual property, economic regulations, freedom of expression, confidentiality or privacy of information, information security, access management, and regulating the dissemination of public information. The most common audience for information policy analysis includes undergraduate and graduate students, scholars, policymakers, policy analysts, as well as those members of the public who have taken an interest in understanding the effects of the laws and regulations involving information.

== Overview ==
Information policy is the central problem for information societies. As nations make the transition from industrialism to post-industrialism, information issues become increasingly critical. According to sociologist Daniel Bell, "what counts now is not raw muscle power or energy but information." While all societies have been to some extent based on information, information societies are almost wholly dependent on computerized information. Marc Uri Porat, the first researcher to use the term "information policy," wrote: "The foundation of the information economy, our new central fact, is the computer. Its ability to manipulate and process information represents a profound departure from our modest human abilities." The computer's combination with telecommunications, he continued, posed "the policy problems of the future."

Information policy became a prominent field of study during the latter half of the 20th century. It has since evolved from being seen as relatively unimportant to having a much more overarching significance since it establishes the conditions “under which all other decision making, public discourse, and political activity occur.” The growing awareness in the importance of information policy has sparked an interest in various groups to further study and analyze its magnitude.

Although information policy generally has a broader definition and encapsulates a multitude of components, its scope and impact can vary depending on the context. For example, in the context of an information lifecycle, information policy refers to the laws and policies that deal with the stages information goes through beginning with its creation, through its collection, organization, dissemination, and finally to its destruction. On the other hand, in the context of public administration, information policy is the means by which government employees, institutions, and information systems adapt themselves to an environment in rapid fluctuation and use information for decision-making.

Information policy is a combination of several varying disciplines including information science, economics, law, and public policy. Thus, its scope may differ when each of these disciplines analyses or uses it. The information sciences may be more concerned with technical advances and how this impacts information policy, while from a law perspective, issues such as privacy rights and intellectual property may be of greatest focus.

== History ==
The earliest sight of information policy was present around the mid-1900s. The stages to begin evolving from an industrial society to an information society sparked several other transformations. The common industrial technologies were beginning to be replaced by informational meta-technologies. Organizations began changing their form, several new architectures of knowledge developed, and most importantly, the information economy replaced industrial and agricultural economies.

By the 1970s, the concept of national information policy was created to protect the data and information that was used in creating public policies. The earliest adopters of information policy included the United States, Australia, as well as several European countries who all recognized the importance for a more standardized governance of information.

Elizabeth Orna contributed to a paper on information policies by providing a brief history of the development of ideas surrounding national and organizational information policies, from the beginning when the United Kingdom Ministry of Information was established in the First World War to present day.

In the 20th century, to cope with the privacy problems of databases, information policy evolved further safeguards. In the US, the federal Privacy Act provides individuals the right to inspect and correct personal information in federal data files.

== Types and importance ==
The types of information policy can be separated into two different categories. It can be discussed in the short-term focus exclusively on information science. It can also have a much broader context in relation to different subjects and be within a larger time period, for example dating back to Roman civilization, the Bill of Rights, or the Constitution.

The obvious reason for the need of information policy deals with the legal issues that can be associated with the advancement of technology. More precisely,—the digitization of the cultural content made the cost of the copy decreasing to nearly zero and increased the illegal exchange of files, online, via sharing web site or P2P technologies, or off line (copy of hard disks). As a result, there are many grey areas between what users can and cannot do, and this creates the need for some sort of regulation. Today, this has led to the creation of SOPA (Stop Online Piracy Act). Information policy will mark the boundaries needed to evaluate certain issues dealing with the creation, processing, exchange, access, and use of information.

Boundaries are essential for avoiding risks, such as financial losses from incomplete and uncoordinated exploitation of information, wasted time, failures of innovation, and reputation loss; for positive benefits, including negotiation and openness among those responsible for different aspects of information management; productive use of IT in supporting staff in their use of information; and the ability to initiate change to take advantage of changing environments.

== Issues ==
There are some issues around organizational information policies, which are the interaction between human beings and technology for using information, the issue to proceed information policy itself, whether top-down or middle-up-down, is the best way to approach information policy in an organization. Also, issues that information tends to be influenced by organization's culture that result in complexity of information flow. Moreover, the concern about valuing information is discussed by Orna, the fact that value of information is dependent on the user, and it can't be measured by price. Considering that information is an asset or intellectual capital that becomes valuable when it is used in productive ways.

== Convergence ==
Convergence essentially combines all forms of media, telecommunications, broadcasting, and computing by the use of a single technology: digital computers. It integrates diverse technological systems in the hopes of improving performance of similar tasks. Convergence is thought to be the result of the need for expansion into new markets due to competition and technological advances that have created a threat of new entrants into various segments of the value chain. As a result, previously disparate technologies interact with one other synergistically to deliver information in new and unique ways and allow for inventive solutions to be developed.

Nearly every innovative trend in the social industry involves adding data or layers of connectivity. Social networking sites have begun interacting with e-mail functionalities, search engines have begun integrating Internet searches with Facebook data, Twitter along with various other social media platforms have started to play a prominent role in the emergency management framework (mitigation, preparedness, response, and recovery) among several others.

In 2012 a prominent issue arose that deals with the convergence of social media with copyright infringement monitoring systems. The growing interest in this topic can be largely attributed to the recent anti-piracy bills: the Stop Online Piracy Act and the PROTECT IP Act. Various officials from all over the world have expressed an interest in forcing social networks to install and utilize monitoring systems to determine if users are illegally obtaining copyrighted material. For example, if implemented, these filters could prevent the illegal sharing of music over social networking platforms. The convergence of search engines and social networks could make this process even easier. Search engines such as Google, Yahoo, and Bing have begun to merge with social media platforms to link Internet searches to your social networking sites such as Facebook. This poses an even greater threat to users since their Internet searches can be monitored via their social networks.

The issue of converging social networks with piracy monitoring systems becomes controversial when it comes to protecting personal data and abiding by privacy laws. In order for a synergy such as this one to take place, regulatory convergence would need to be considered. Regulatory convergence is the merging of previously disparate industry-based laws and regulations into a single legal and regulatory framework.

== Internet governance ==
Internet governance has both narrow and broad definitions, thus, making it a complex concept to understand. When most people think of Internet governance, they think of the regulations of the content and conduct that are communicated and acted on through the Internet. Although this is certainly a broad component of Internet governance, additionally, there are more narrow elements to the definition that are often overlooked. Internet governance also encompasses the regulation of Internet infrastructure and the processes, systems, and institutions that regulate the fundamental systems that determine the capabilities of the Internet.

Architecture is the foundation of the Internet. The fundamental goal of the Internet architecture is to essentially create a network of networks by interconnecting various computer network systems globally. Protocols such as TCP/IP as well as other network protocols serve as the rules and conventions by which computers can communicate with each other. Thus, TCP/IP is often viewed as the most important institution of Internet governance. It serves as the backbone to network connectivity.

Organizations such as the Internet Corporation for Assigned Names and Numbers (ICANN) coordinate the various systems within the Internet on a global level to help preserve the operational stability of the Internet. For example, coordination of IP addresses and managing the Domain Name System (DNS) ensure computers and devices can correctly connect to the Internet and can communicate effectively globally. If regulation of these crucial elements of the Internet such as TCP/IP and DNS were governed by disparate principles, the Internet would no longer exist as it does today. Networks, computers, and peripherals would not be able to communicate and have the same accessibility if these foundational elements varied.

== Government roles ==
Like with any policy, there needs to be an agent to govern and regulate it. With information policy in a broader sense, the government has several roles and responsibilities. Some examples include providing accurate information, producing and maintaining information that meets the specific needs of the public, protecting the privacy and confidentiality of personal and sensitive information, and making informed decisions on which information should be disseminated and how to distribute it effectively, among others. Although the government plays an active role in information policy, the analysis of information policy should not only include the formal decision making processes by government entities, but also the formal and informal decisions of both the private and public sector of governance.

=== Security vs freedom of information ===
A persistent debate concerning the government role in information policy is the separation of security and freedom of information. Legislation such as the Uniting and Strengthening America by Providing Appropriate Tools Required to Intercept and Obstruct Terrorism (USA PATRIOT or USAPA) Act of 2001 is an example of security taking precedence over civil liberties. The USAPA affected several surveillance and privacy laws to include:

- Wire Tapping (Title III) which requires there be probable cause for real-time interception of voice and data communication.
- Electronic Communications Privacy Act (ECPA) regulates government access to email and other electronic communications.
- Foreign Intelligence Surveillance Act (FISA) authorizes the government to carry out electronic surveillance against any person, including Americans.

The USAPA was passed in October 2001, not long after 9/11 and without much contention from Congress. Civil liberties advocates argue that the changes made to the standing surveillance laws were done in an abrupt manner and without consideration to basic rights as outlined in the US constitution, specifically fourth amendment rights which protects against unreasonable search and seizure.

== Research methods and tools ==
The five broad methodological strands identified by Rowlands are current tools for information policy study:

1. Classification: Thetool demonstrates a wide range of issues and subjects on information policy. It helps research to understand the breadth of the subject. The published materials are reasonably well documented and described. It is also good for start-up literature review and research purposes.
2. Identification of policy issues and options: This tool relies on inputs for information; for example, interviews and questionnaires targeting policy makers and other stakeholders. It is a commonly used in the studies of on-the-job policy makers in government or industry.
3. Reductionism: The reductionist approach control factors to reduce ambiguity. The factors include constraining data collection, analysis and interpretation within the framework of a specific discipline. It helps researchers to notice how a specific factor relates to the overall environment.
4. Forecasting and scenario-building: The commonly used model is STEEP framework. It helps in reducing uncertainties for a topic that is under studies.
5. Process-oriented research and cases studies: It provides detailed contextual analyses of particular events. It helps researcher to experience the policy process in semi-real situation and study its outcome.

== The Future ==
In regard to the future of information policy, it should be flexible and changing to different circumstances as the ability to access, store, and share information grows. Galvin suggests that information policy might include setting a boundary to the uncertainty in this field. As information policy becomes a larger and more important topic, it will also become a greater subject to governmental regulation in regards to the future of technology as well. It will also include the studies of these subjects: information science, communications, library science, and technology studies.

The information policies will earn more advantages for national and organizational, such as getting the best from development of Web 2.0 nationally and in organization, influence people for paying attention to the socio aspect and socio-technical system, for securing preservation of digital content, bringing out information product, also respecting all users and making thinking time respectable.

In order to achieve this national organization, it will be important to focus not only on a domestic level but also nationally. Making domestic agencies cooperate internationally (and vice versa) though, will not be overly successful. A single nation can take the lead in establishing communication-based relationships specifically regarding the internet. These relations will need to be slowly and consistently established in order to truly unify any kind of information policy and decision-making. If information policy can be established and guided on a semi-national level, the degree of communication and cooperation throughout the world will increase dramatically. As information policy continues to shape many aspects of society, these international relations will become vital.

Information policy is playing a greater role in the economy leading to the production of goods and services, as well as selling them directly to consumers. The cost of information varies from a tangible good in that initial costs of the first unit are large and fixed; however, after that, marginal costs are relatively low. As an increase from the information services, information can be paralleled to that of manufacturing several years ago. The digitalization of information allows businesses to make better justified business decisions.

== See also ==
- Cyber Intelligence Sharing and Protection Act
- Cyberspace
- Executive Order 12333
- Foreign Intelligence Surveillance Act
- Social informatics
- Stop Online Piracy Act

== Sources ==
- Andersen, David Fadum; Dawes, Sharon S. (1991). Government information management: a primer and casebook. Englewood Cliffs, N.J: Prentice Hall. ISBN 978-0-13-361866-2 – via Internet Archive.
- Bell, Daniel (1973). The coming of post-industrial society: a venture in social forecasting. New York: Basic Books. ISBN 978-0-465-01281-7.
- Bozeman, Barry; Bretschneider, Stuart (1986). "Public Management Information Systems: Theory and Prescription". Public Administration Review. 46: 475–487. doi:10.2307/975569. ISSN 0033-3352. JSTOR 975569.
- Braman, S. (2006). "An introduction to information policy". Change of state: Information, policy, and power (PDF). Cambridge, MA: MIT Press. pp. 1–8. Archived from the original (PDF) on 2016-03-04 – via University of Wisconsin-Milwaukee.
- Braman, S. (2011). "Defining information policy". Journal of Information Policy. 1: 1–5. doi:10.5325/jinfopoli.1.2011.0001.
- Browne, M. (1997). "The Field of Information Policy: 1. Fundamental Concepts". Journal of Information Science. 23 (4): 273–282. doi:10.1177/016555159702300401.
- Duff, Alistair S. (2004). "The Past, Present, and Future of Information Policy". Information, Communication & Society. 7 (1): 69–87. doi:10.1080/1369118042000208906.
- Galvin, T.J. (1994). "Rights in Conflict: public policy in an information age". New Worlds in Information and Documentation : Proceedings of the 46th FID Conference and Congress.
- Garcia-Murillo, Martha; MacInnes, Ian (2003-01-01). "The impact of technological convergence on the regulation of ICT industries". International Journal on Media Management. 5 (1): 57–67. doi:10.1080/14241270309390019. ISSN 1424-1277.
- Heim, Kathleen M. (1986). "National Information Policy and a Mandate for Oversight by the Information Professions". Government Publications Review. 13: 21–37. doi:10.1016/0277-9390(86)90025-7.
- Hill, M. W. (1995). "Information Policies: premonitions and prospects". Journal of Information Science. 21 (4): 273–282. doi:10.1177/016555159502100403.
- Houck, 2012
- MacInnis, Deborah J. (2011). "A Framework for Conceptual Contributions in Marketing". SSRN Electronic Journal. doi:10.2139/ssrn.1845968. ISSN 1556-5068. SSRN 1845968.
- Mason, Marilyn Gell (1983). The federal role in library and information services. White Plains, N.Y.: Knowledge Industry Publishers Inc. ISBN 9780867290103 – via Internet Archive.
- McClure, Charles R., ed. (1989). United States government information policies: views and perspectives. Information management, policy, and services. Norwood, N.J: Ablex Publishing Co. ISBN 978-0-89391-563-6.
- Orna, Elizabeth (2008). "Information policies: yesterday, today, tomorrow". Journal of Information Science. 34 (4): 547–565. doi:10.1177/016555150809225 (inactive 1 July 2025).
- Porat, Marc Uri (1977). The Information Economy (Report). Office of Telecommunications.
- Reisinger, Don (2012-01-17). "Twitter shutting down for SOPA? That's just 'foolish,' CEO says". CNET.
- Reisinger, Markus (March 2012). "Platform competition for advertisers and users in media markets". International Journal of Industrial Organization. 30 (2): 243–252. doi:10.1016/j.ijindorg.2011.10.002.
- Rowlands, I. (1996). "Understanding Information Policy : Concepts, Frameworks, and Research Tools". Journal of Information Science. 22 (1): 13–25. doi:10.1177/016555159602200102.
- Solum, Lawrence B. (2008-09-03). Models of Internet Governance (Report). University of Illinois. SSRN 1136825. Archived from the original on 2025-01-02.
- Stanchak, 2010
- Stevens, John M.; MacGowan, Robert P. (1985). Information systems and public management. Praeger special studies. New York, NY: Praeger. ISBN 978-0-03-004447-2.
