= Institutionalisation =

Process of embedding some conception in an organisation

In sociology, institutionalisation (or institutionalization) is the process of embedding some conception (for example a belief, norm, social role, particular value or mode of behaviour) within an organisation, social system, or society as a whole.

The term may also be used to refer to committing a particular individual or group to an institution, such as a mental or welfare institution; or the adverse psychological effects of living in such an institution. The term may also be used in a political sense to apply to the creation or organisation of governmental institutions or particular bodies responsible for overseeing or implementing policy, for example in welfare or development. During the period of the Industrial Revolution in Europe many countries went through a period of "institutionalization", which saw a large expansion and development of the role of government within society, particularly into areas seen previously as the private sphere. Institutionalisation is also seen as an important part of the process of modernisation in developing countries, involving again the expansion and improved organisation of government structures.

== History ==
During the period from 1850 to 1930 many types of institutions were created by public subscription, Parliament and local authorities to provide housing, healthcare, education, and financial support for individuals in need. At the upper end of the scale, public boarding schools such as Eton and Harrow were founded or greatly extended to meet the growing demand for the education of the children of those in colonial service overseas. These were seen as models of social improvement, and many inferior imitations followed for the lower social orders. Virtually every borough in the UK was required by legislation to make provision for paupers, homeless, released prisoners, convicted criminals, orphans, disabled war veterans, older people with no means of support, deaf and blind schools, schools and colonies for those with learning disabilities or mental health problems.

Distinguishing features of such institutions were frequently, but not exclusively:

- communal dormitories
- communal kitchens and dining facilities
- rural, isolated locations
- restrictions on personal liberty and possessions
- uniforms
- oppressive, authoritarian regimes
- strict systems of rules and codes of conduct
- boards of visitors or trustees, usually drawn from the ranks of the upper middle classes, the so-called "great and good"
- hierarchical systems of management
- compulsory religious attendance
- involvement of inmates as unpaid or poorly rewarded labour in return for small privileges
- widespread abuse of human rights, dignity
- rigid separation of the sexes
- excessive reliance on medication and physical restraints

Many of these organisations, whilst originally expressing idealistic aspirations and aims, became "total" institutions within a generation or two of their foundation, providing in some cases cradle-to-grave housing, occupation and social control. Founding charters usually proclaimed beneficial outcomes of "reform" (or rehabilitation) of character through moral and occupation education and discipline, but in practice inmates were often trapped in a system that provided no obvious route of escape or promotion. As late as the 1950s, in Britain, several hundred thousand people lived in Victorian asylums and "colonies".

== See also ==
- Deinstitutionalisation
