= American Library Association Honorary Membership =

Award

Honorary Membership conferred by the American Library Association is the Association's highest award. "Honorary membership may be conferred on a living citizen of any country whose contribution to librarianship or a closely related field is so outstanding that it is of lasting importance to the advancement of the whole field of library service. It is intended to reflect honor upon the ALA as well as upon the individual." The Honorary Membership award was established in 1879.

The first Honorary Memberships were bestowed in 1879 to Charles William Eliot, President of Harvard University and Frederick O. Prince Trustee of the Boston Public Library.

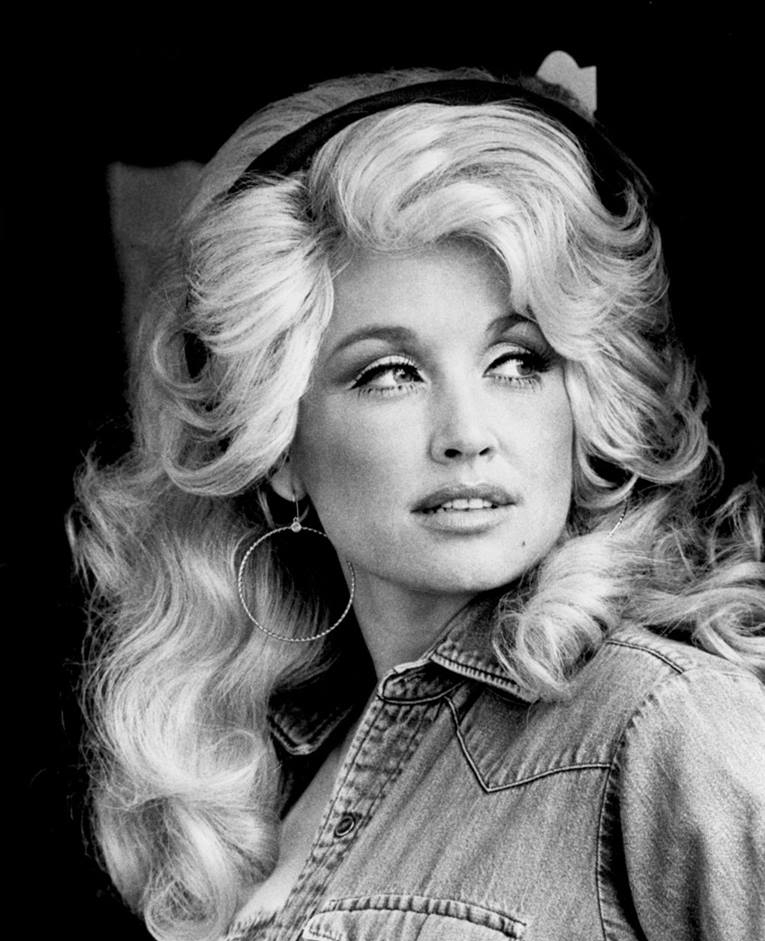
Dolly Parton-Honorary Member-2023

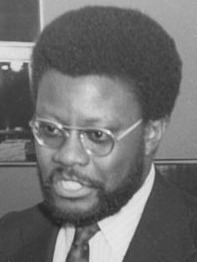
Robert Wedgeworth, Honorary Member, 2021

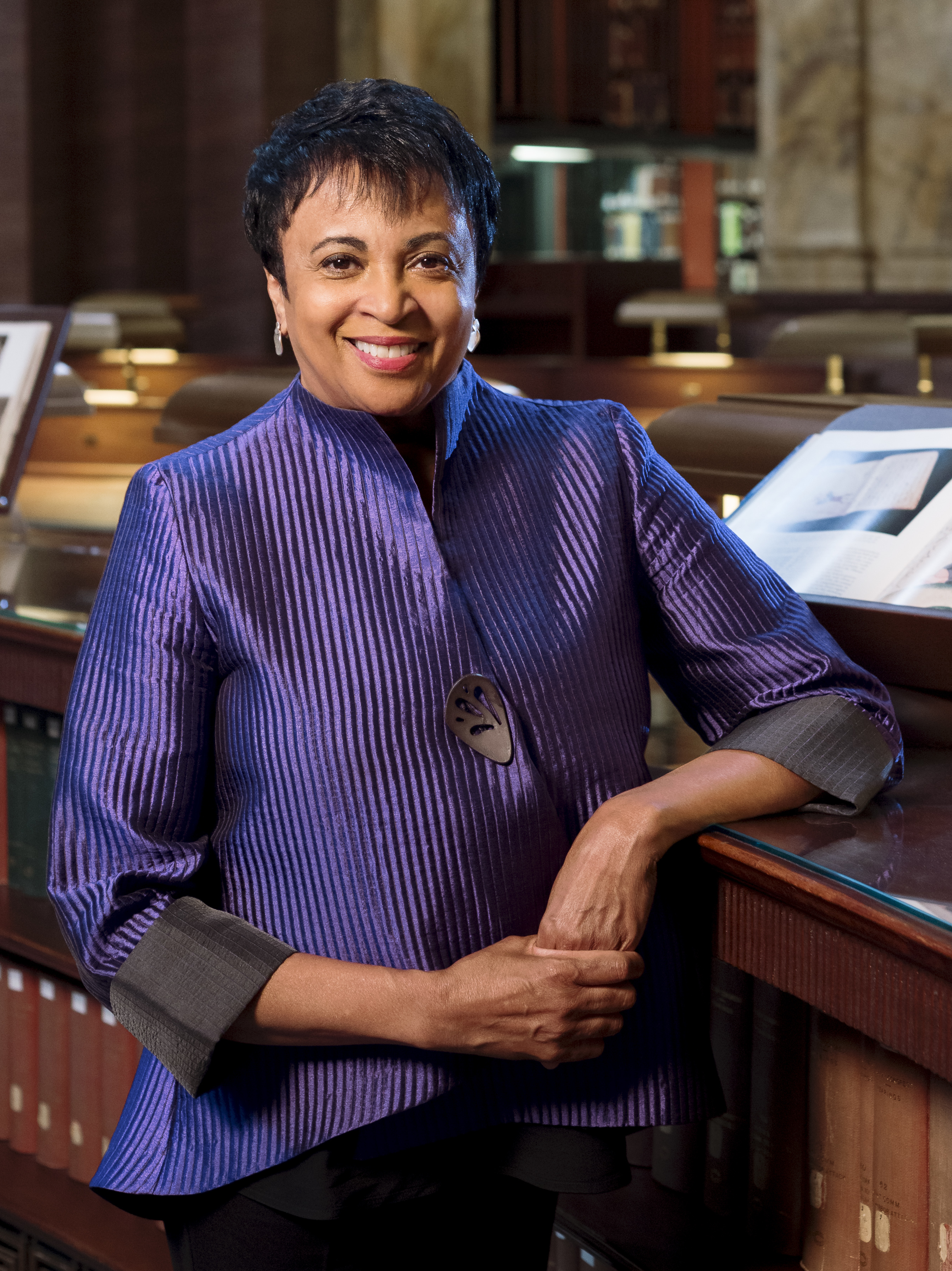
Librarian of Congress Carla Hayden, Honorary Member-2018

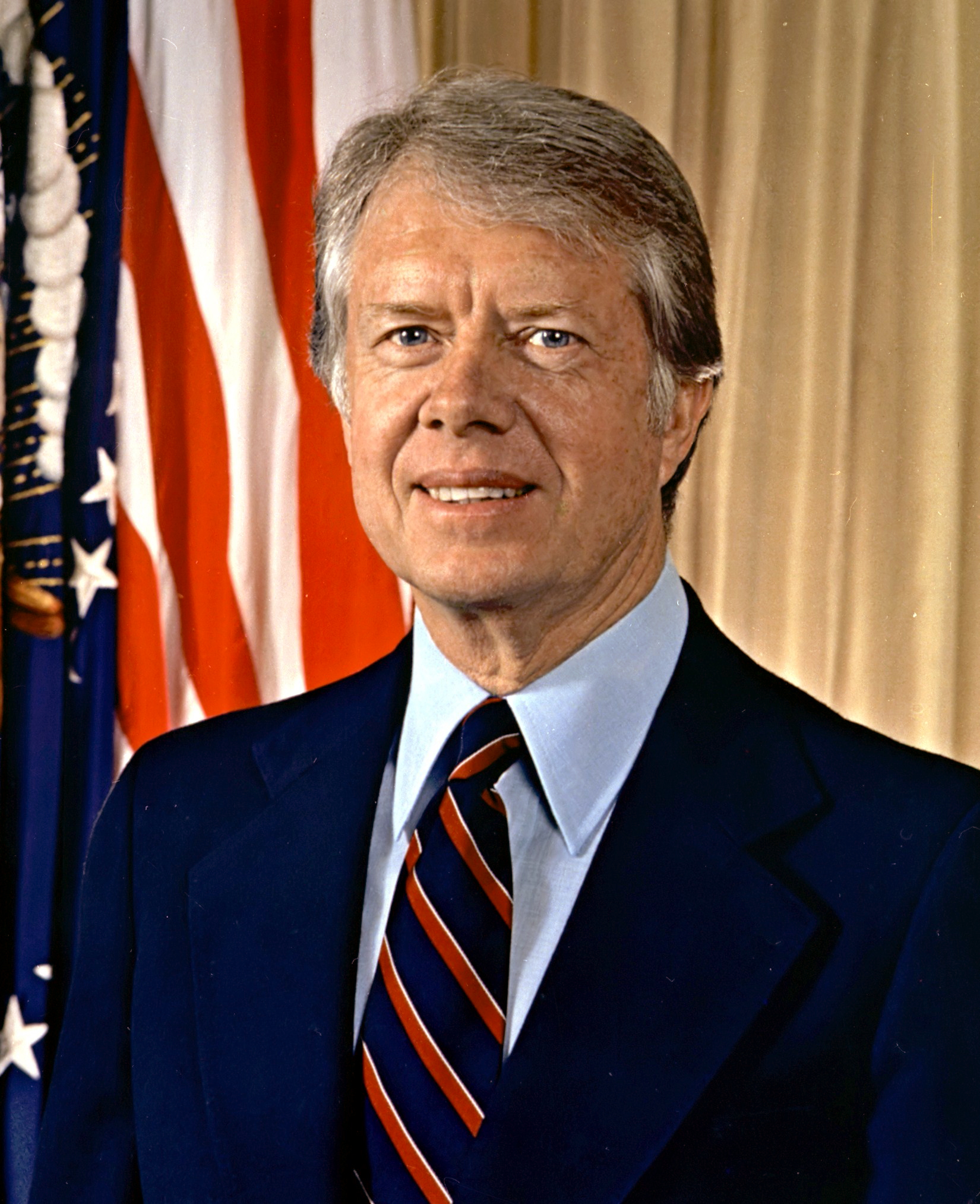
Jimmy Carter-Honorary Member-1994

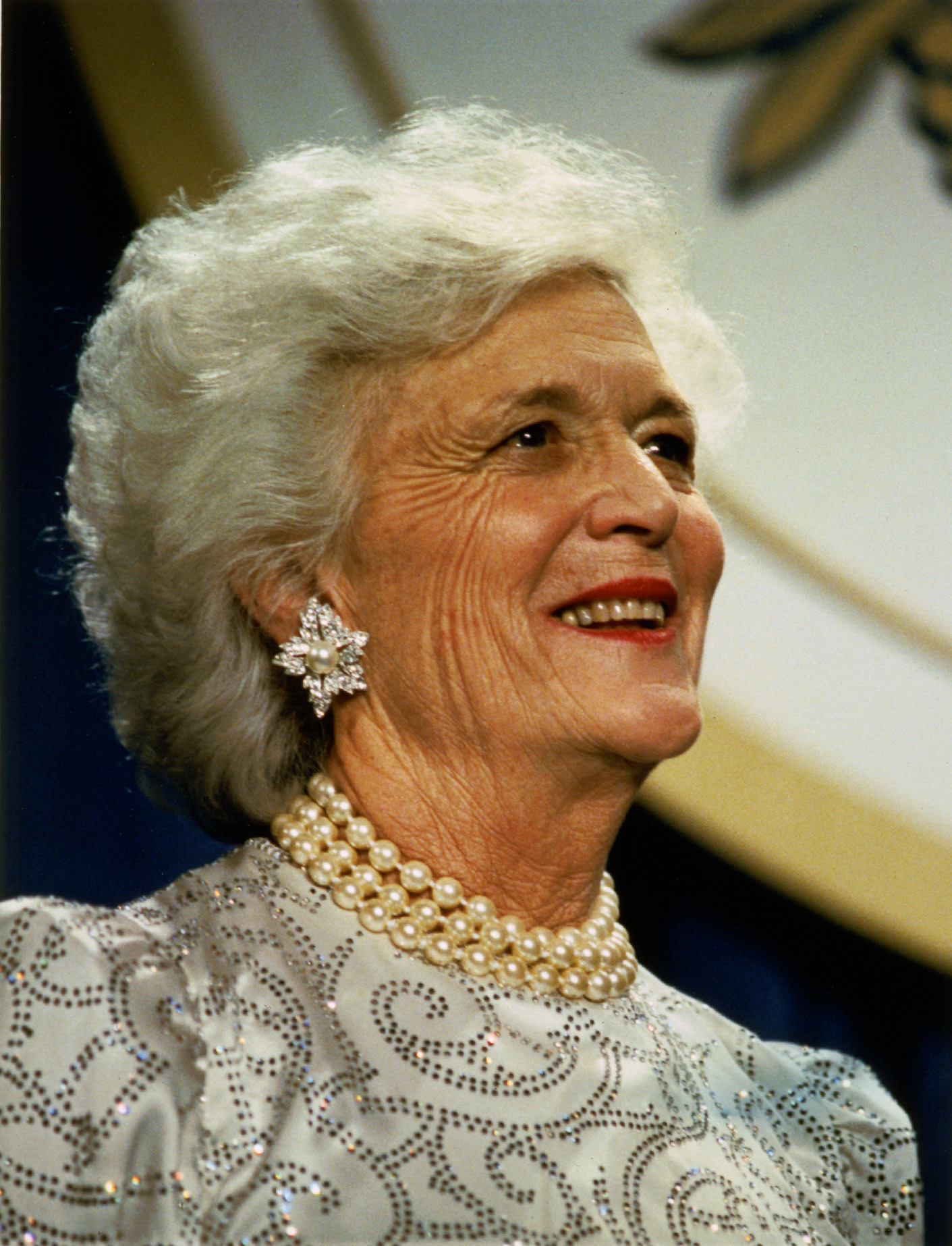
Barbara Bush-Honorary Member- 1990

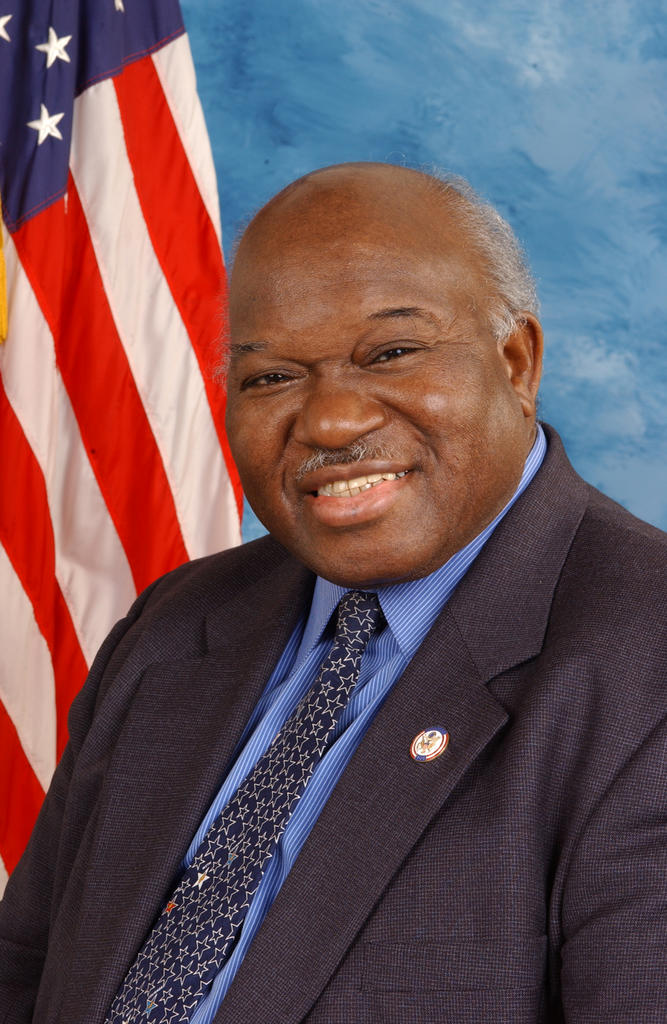
Major Owens-Honorary Member- 1987

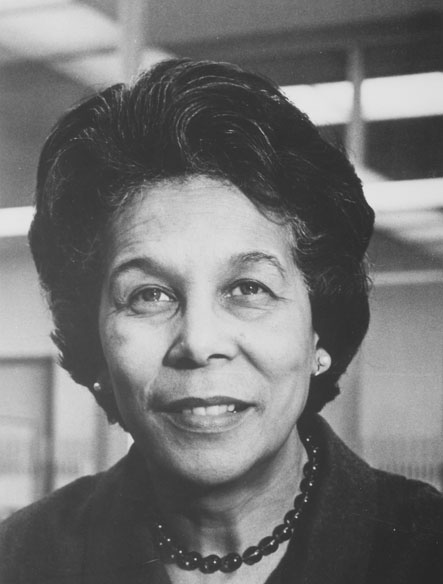
Clara Stanton Jones- Honorary Member-1983

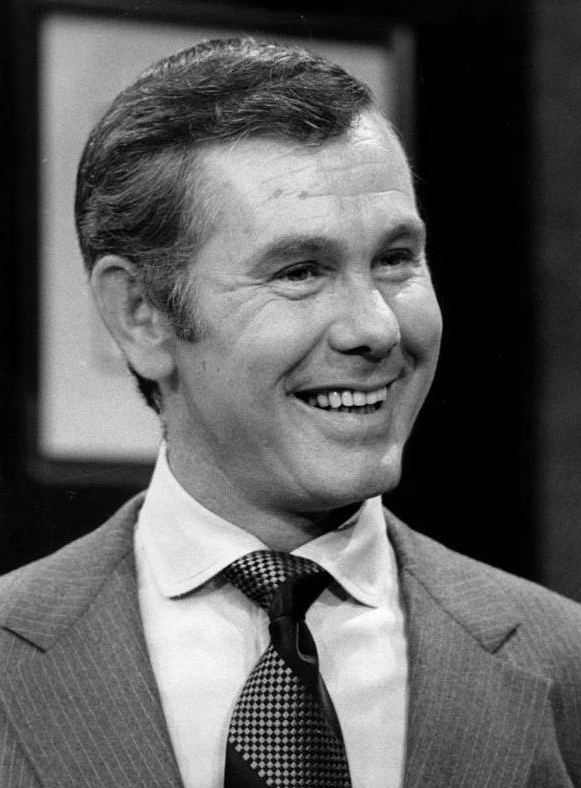
Johnny Carson-Honorary Member - 1983

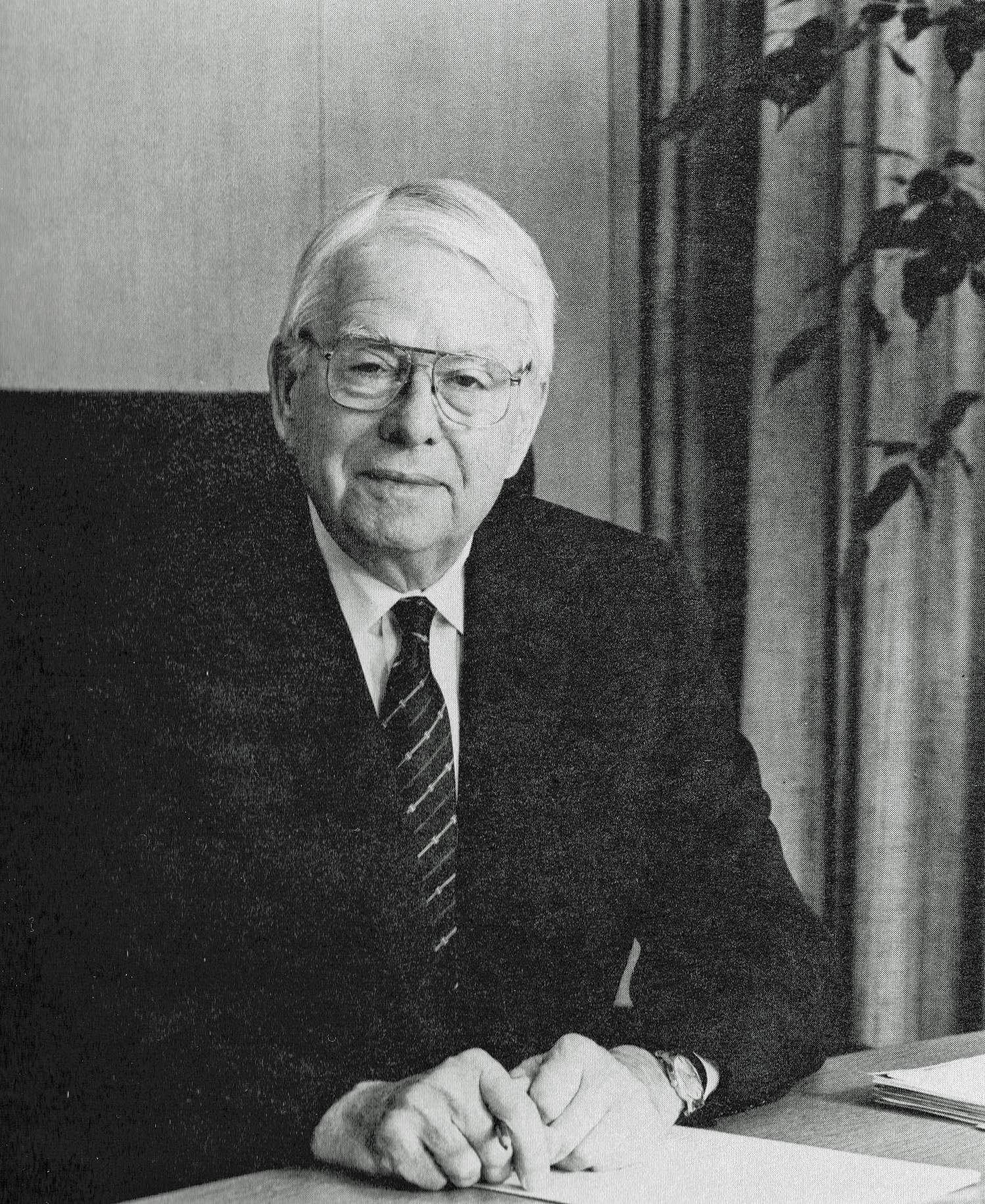
Frederick G. Kilgour Honorary Membership-1982

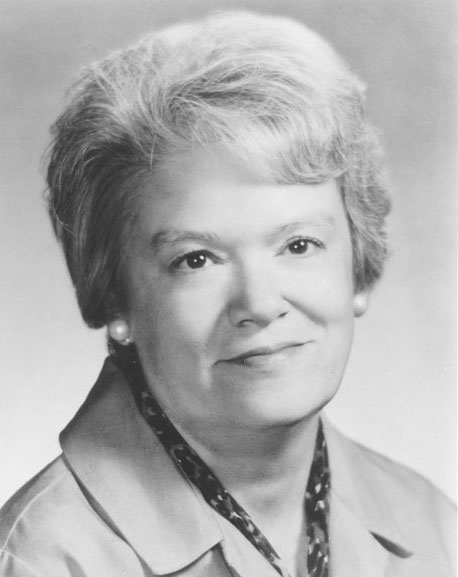
Allie Beth Martin-Honorary Member-1976

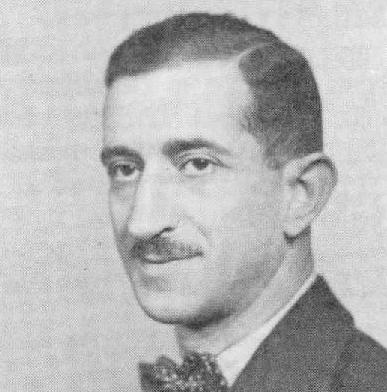
Ralph Robert Shaw - Honorary Member - 1970

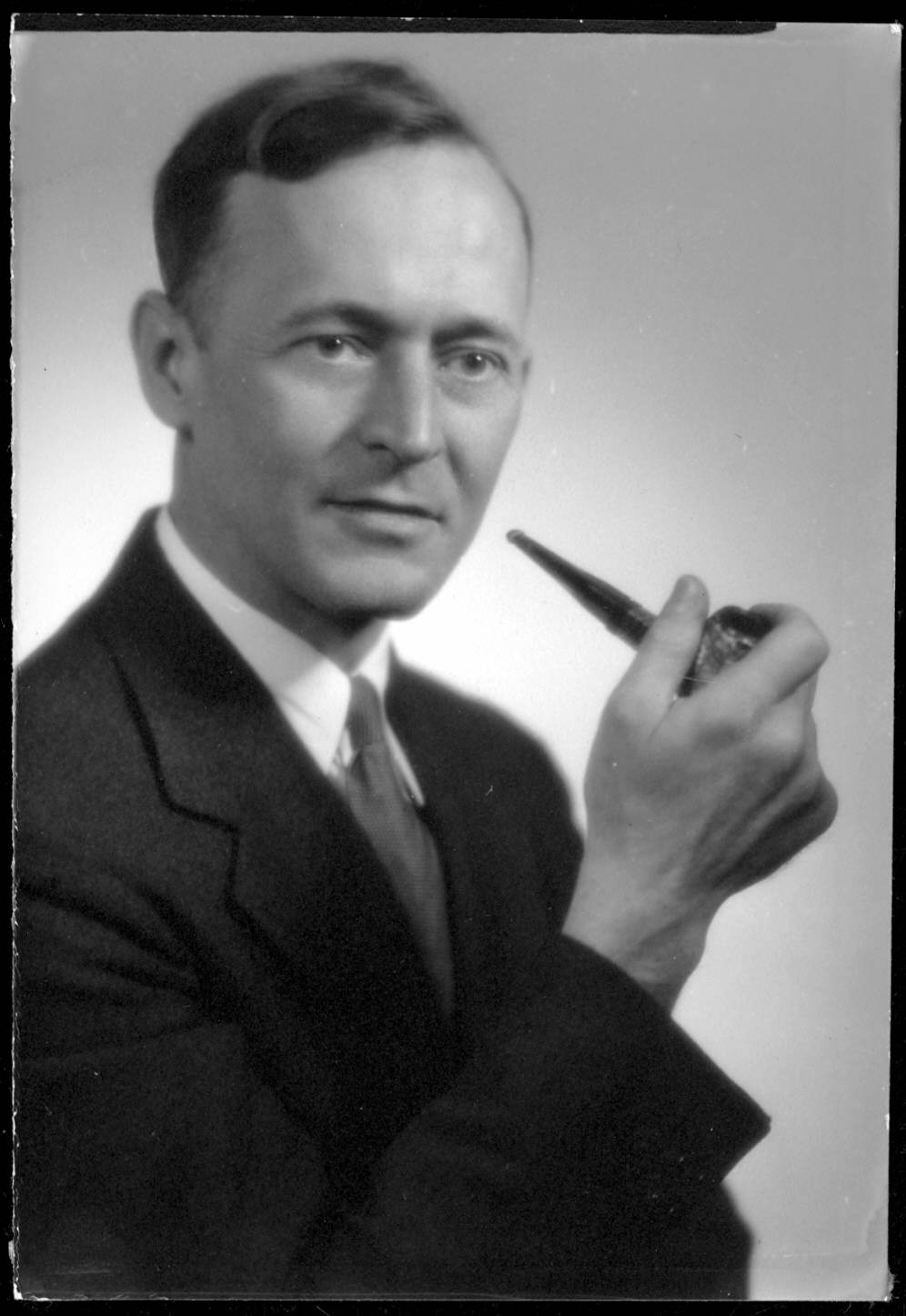
Verner Warren Clapp-Honorary Member -1967

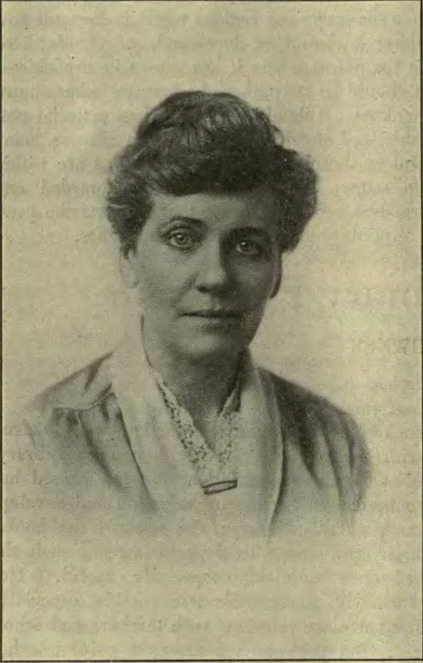
Linda Eastman-Honorary Member-1954

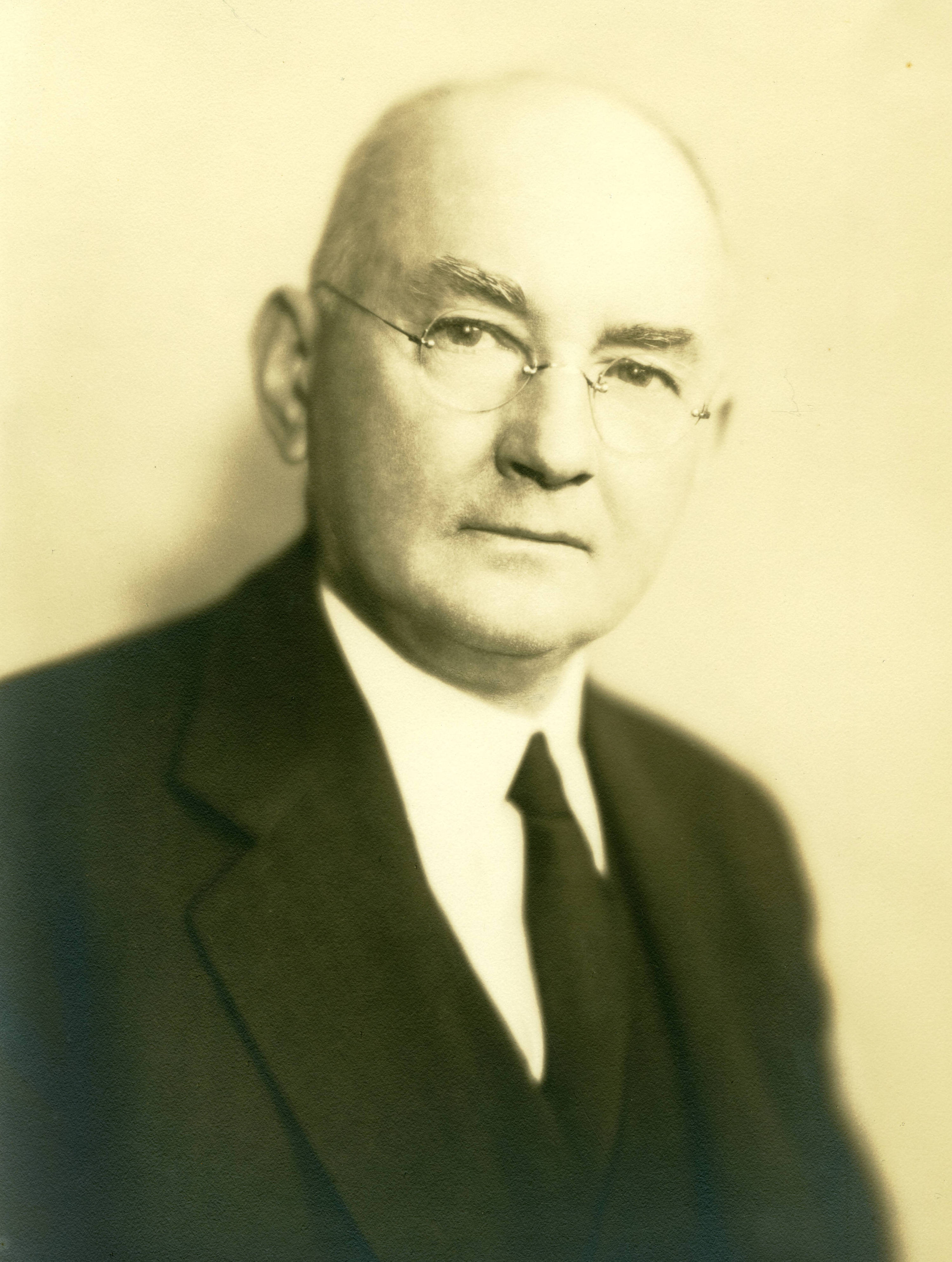
Louis Round Wilson - Honorary Member-1951

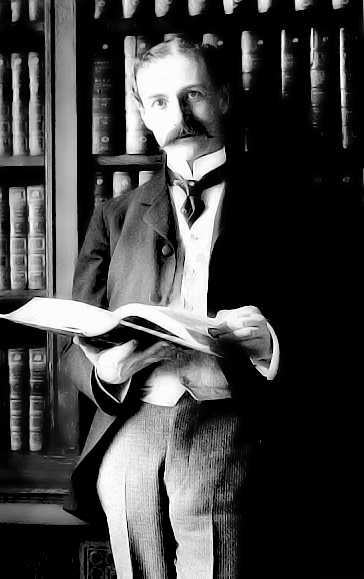
Herbert Putnam - Honorary Member -1940

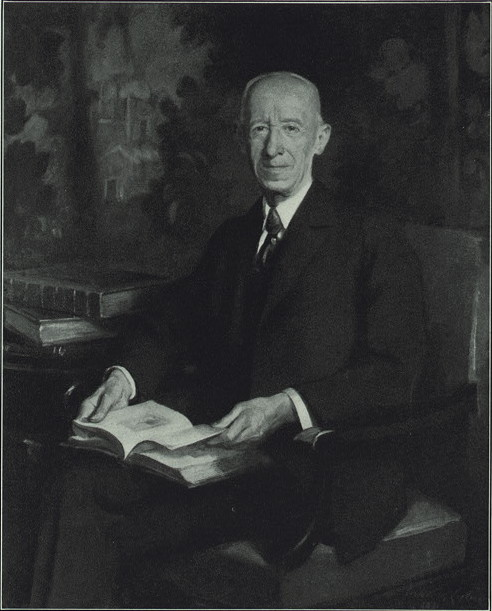
Wilberforce Eames - Honorary Member -1933

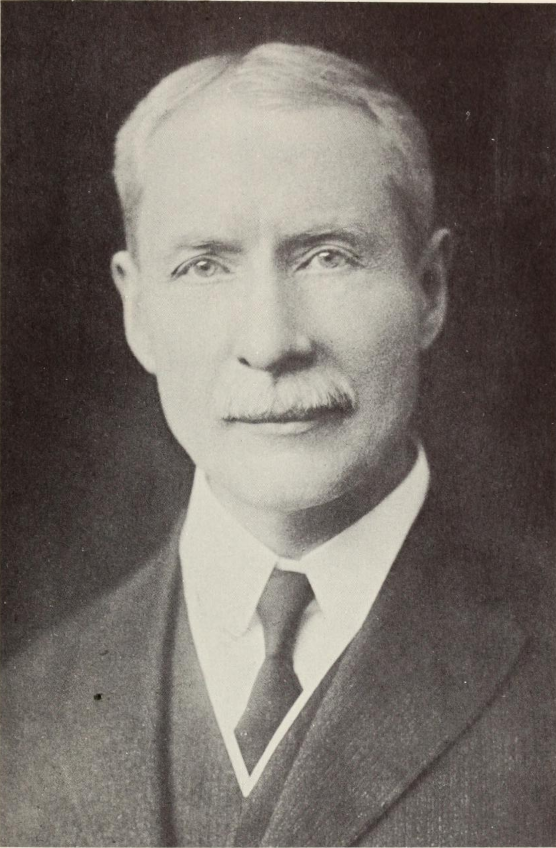
Charles Evans Honorary Member - 1933

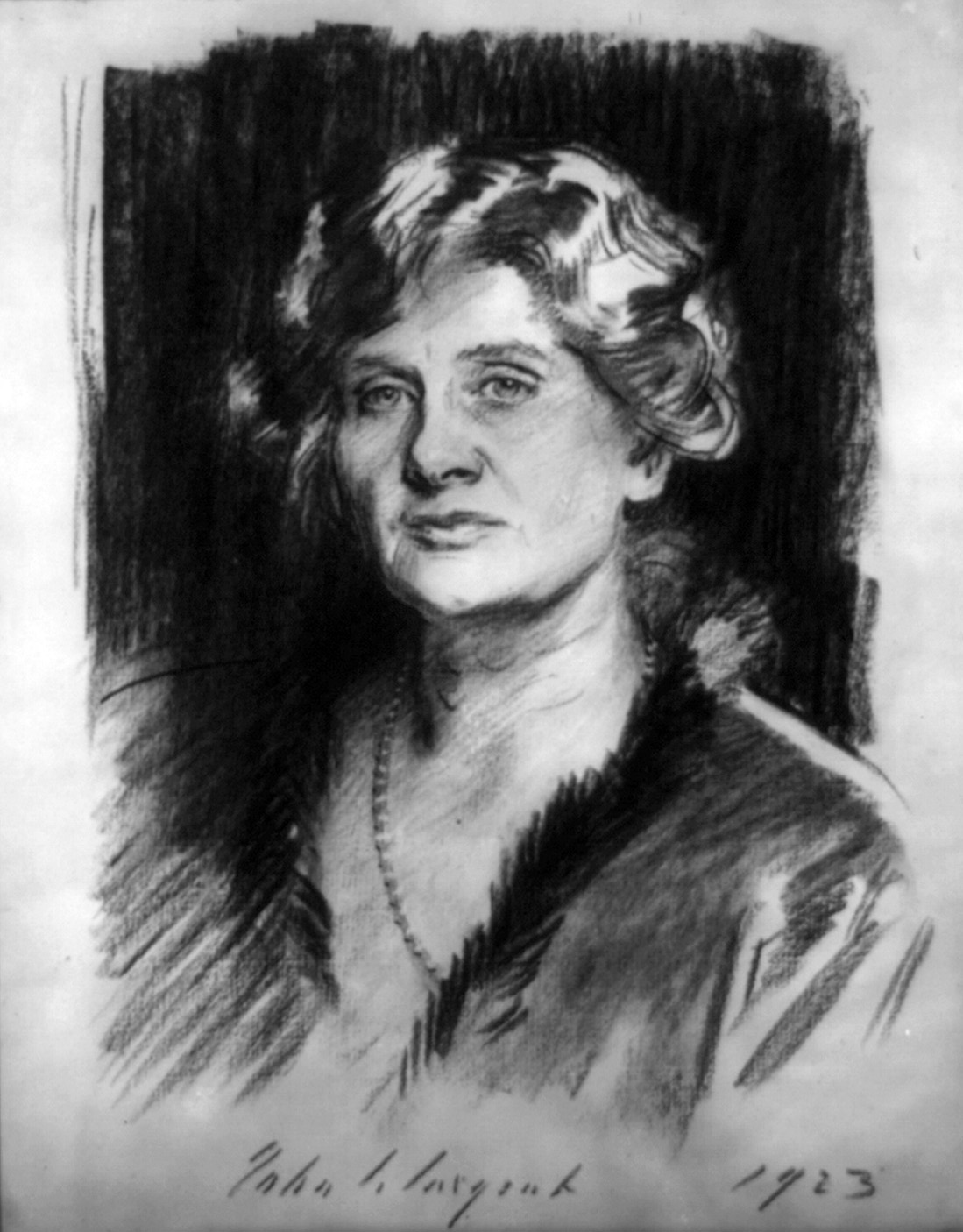
Elizabeth Sprague Coolidge - Honorary Member - 1930

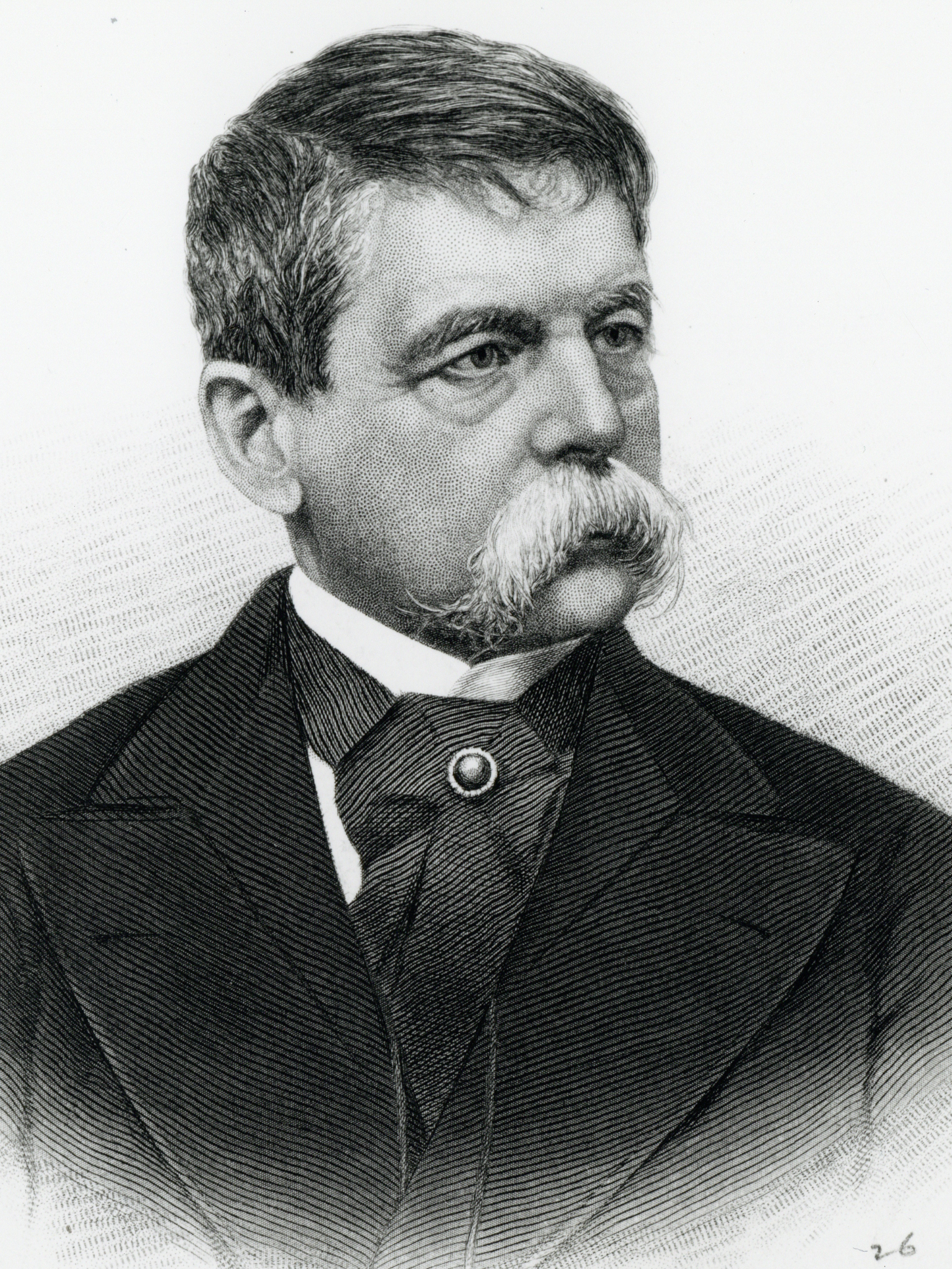
Frederick O. Prince - Honorary Member -1898

Honorary Membership	Date	Major accomplishments
Barbara J. Ford	2026	Director, Mortenson Center for International Library Programs at the University of Illinois at Urbana-Champaign libraries; President, American Library Association,1997-1998.
Robert R. Newlen	2026	Acting Librarian of Congress; Joseph W. Lippincott Award; ALA Medal of Excellence.
Skip Dye	2025	President of United for Libraries; Senior Vice President, Penguin Random House.
No Award	2024	
Dolly Parton	2023	Founder, Imagination Library, award-winning singer-songwriter, actress, businesswoman and philanthropist. Longstanding support and commitment to inspiring a love of books and reading.
Maureen Sullivan	2022	President, American Library Association, President Association of College and Research Libraries, President, Library Leadership and Management Association.
James G. Neal	2022	President and Treasurer, American Library Association
Robert Wedgeworth	2021	Executive Director, American Library Association; President, International Federation of Library Associations and Institutions
No Awards	2019–2020	
Carla Hayden	2018	Librarian of Congress
Ann K. Symons	2017	President and Treasurer, American Library Association
No Award	2015–2016	
Patricia Glass Schuman	2014	President and Treasurer, American Library Association, Joseph W. Lippincott Award, Founder, Neal-Schuman Publishers.
No Award	2013	
Jack Reed	2012	U. S. Senator, (D. RI)
Betty J. Turock	2011	President, American Library Association, ALA SPECTRUM founder, Professor & Dean, Rutgers School of Communication and Information.
Yohannes Gebregeorgis	2011	Founder of Ethiopia Reads
No award	2010	
Judith F. Krug	2009	Director, Office for Intellectual Freedom, American Library Association, Director Freedom to Read Foundation
Pat Mora	2008	Poet, author, founder of El día de los niños, el día de los libros
Effie Lee Morris	2008	President, Public Library Association, pioneering public library services for minorities and the visually-impaired.
Peggy Sullivan	2008	President, American Library Association, executive director, American Library Association, library historian.
David Cohen	2007	Contributions to multicultural librarianship and intellectual freedom
Alice L. Hagemeyer	2007	Passionate, lifelong interest in promoting information about the language, culture and achievements of deaf individuals.
Anita R. Schiller	2007	Groundbreaking efforts to enhance the status of women in librarianship.
Alphonse F. Trezza	2007	Executive Director of the National Commission on Libraries and Information Science, Director of the Illinois State Library.
Robert D. Stueart	2006	President, Association for Library and Information Science Education, Beta Phi Mu Award.
Lotsee Patterson	2005	Professor, founder of the American Indian Library Association, Beta Phi Mu Award.
Nettie Barcroft Taylor	2005	Director, Maryland State Library, Command Librarian for the U.S. Army in Heidelberg, Germany, Maryland Women's Hall of Fame
Sanford Berman	2004	For his accomplishments as a cataloging theorist and practitioner and for his commitment to making catalog records accessible to library users.
Norman Horrocks	2004	Director, School of Information Management, Dalhousie University, Officer of the Order of Canada.
Barbara Gittings	2003	Lifelong commitment to developing positive images of gays and lesbians in the literature and on library shelves and to ensuring equal access to information for all people.
Samuel F. Morrison	2003	Director, Broward County Library, founded the African-American Research Library and Cultural Center, Chief librarian Chicago Public Library oversaw design and construction, Harold Washington Library Center.
Lucille Cole Thomas	2003	Notable contributions to the profession as a librarian, educator and library trustee, her leadership role at the local, state, national and international levels, and unstinting contributions to the education of children and young adults.
E.J. Josey	2002	President, American Library Association, President Black Caucus of the American Library Association
Seymour Lubetzky	2002	Cataloging theorist ranked among the greatest minds in library science. Groundbreaking work devoted to modern cataloging in the 20th century place him with Antonio Panizzi and Charles Cutter.
Arnulfo Trejo	2001	Founder of REFORMA, Professor, University of Arizona, Founder Trejo Foster Foundation for Hispanic Library Education.
Jeanne Hurley Simon	2000	Chairperson of the National Commission on Libraries and Information Science.
Vartan Gregorian	2000	President, New York Public Library.
No Award	1999	
Wendell Ford	1998	U.S. Senator (D, KY). Library champion. Quote, “If information is the currency of democracy, then libraries are the banks.”
Bill Gates	1998	Funding free, public computer and Internet access in public libraries.Bill & Melinda Gates Foundation.
Melinda Gates	1998	Funding free, public computer and Internet access in public libraries. Bill & Melinda Gates Foundation.
K. Wayne Smith	1998	President and CEO of OCLC, CEO at World Book Encyclopedia.
Sidney R. Yates	1998	U.S.Congress (D, IL).Yates, Champion of libraries and arts.
Henriette Avram	1997	Developed the MARC format (Machine Readable Cataloging), Associate Librarian for Collections Services, Library of Congress.
Oprah Winfrey	1997	Oprah's Book Club
Eileen D. Cooke	1996	Director, ALA Washington Office, 1972–1993.
Mark Hatfield	1996	U.S. Senator (R, OR)
Nancy Kassebaum	1996	U.S. Senator (R, KS)
Paul Simon	1996	U.S. Senator (D, IL), Champion of public's access to government information.
Pat Williams	1996	U.S.Congressman (D-MT),
No Award	1995	
Jimmy Carter	1994	U.S. President 1977–1981, spoke at White House Conference on Libraries and Information Services.
Virginia Mathews	1994	Director, National Library Week, developer of Sesame Street, co-founded American Indian Library Association, organized 1979 and 1991 White House Conferences on Library and Information Services
Robert G. Vosper	1993	Director, libraries at the University of California, Los Angeles, President, American Library Association, President, Association of College and Research Libraries.
Joseph Becker	1992	Library networking pioneer. Award of Merit - Association for Information Science and Technology.
Miriam L. Hornback	1991	Secretariat to the American Library Association Council and executive board for 47 years. Attended 80 ALA Conferences.
Robert W. Frase	1991	Executive Director of American National Standards Institute Z39;Library Funding and Public Support.
Barbara Bush	1990	First Lady of the United States, Barbara Bush Foundation for Family Literacy
No Award	1989	
Ralph E. Ellsworth	1988	Director of libraries and professor of bibliography at the University of Colorado, author- Academic Library Buildings : A Guide to Architectural Issues and Solutions
Spencer Shaw	1988	Professor, Information School of the University of Washington, (1970–1986), president, Association for Library Service to Children.
Elizabeth W. Stone	1988	Dean, Catholic University of America, School of Library and Information Science, President American Library Association.
Eric Moon	1987	Editor-in-Chief, Library Journal, President, American Library Association.
Major Owens	1987	U.S. Congressman (D, NY), librarian - Brooklyn Public Library.
Frederick Gale Ruffner Jr.	1987	Founder, Gale Research, Decorated World War II veteran.
No Award	1986	
Virginia G. Young	1985	Library Trustee, author- The Library Trustee.
Lester Asheim	1984	Director, International Relations and Director. Office for Library Education, American Library Association. Professor, University of Chicago Graduate Library School and UNC School of Information and Library Science, Beta Phi Mu Award.
William D. Ford	1984	U.S. Congressman (D, MI)
Johnny Carson	1983	Tonight Show, books and authors.
Jack Dalton	1983	Dean, Columbia University School of Library Services, Director Office of International Relations, American Library Association.
Clara Stanton Jones	1983	Director Detroit Public Library, President, American Library Association.
Claiborne Pell	1983	U.S. Senator (D, RI)
George Aiken	1982	U.S. Senator (R, VT)
Carl A. Elliott	1982	U.S. Congressman (D, AL)
Virginia Haviland	1982	Founder, Center for Children's Literature, Library of Congress, chair, Newbery-Caldecott Award Committee, author.
Frederick G. Kilgour	1982	President of OCLC;Legion of Merit for intelligence work during World War II, “History of Library Computerization.”, Award of Merit - Association for Information Science and Technology.
John Brademas	1981	U.S. Congressman (D, IN)
Jacob Javits	1981	U.S. Senator (R, NY)
Lawrence Clark Powell	1981	University Librarian, UCLA Library, President Bibliographical Society of America, author, professor in Residence University of Arizona.
Bessie Boehm Moore	1980	Served on Arkansas Library Commission for 38 years, member National Commission on Libraries and Information Science,
Lowell A. Martin	1979	Educator, author, consultant.
Frances Neel Cheney	1978	Reference expert reviewed over 6,000 books for Wilson Library Bulletin, author- Fundamental Reference Sources.
Fred C. Cole	1978	President, Council on Library Resources, President, Washington and Lee University, Special Commendation of Surgeon General, U.S. Navy.
William S. Dix	1978	Librarian, Princeton University, President, American Library Association, primary author of The Freedom to Read statement.
No Award	1977	
Robert B. Downs	1976	University Librarian, University of Illinois at Urbana-Champaign, President, American Library Association, President, Illinois Library Association, author.
Mary V. Gaver	1976	President, American Library Association, President American Association of School Librarians, Beta Phi Mu Award.
Virginia Lacy Jones	1976	Dean, Atlanta University School of Library Sciences, President, Association for Library and Information Science Education, Beta Phi Mu Award.
Edmon Low	1976	Head librarian, Oklahoma State University 1940–1967 named in his honor: Edmon Low Library, President, Association of College and Research Libraries.
Herman Liebaers	1976	Director general of the central Belgian Royal Library
Allie Beth Martin	1976	President, American Library Association, Director, Tulsa City-County Library, Oklahoma; author- A Strategy for Public Library Change
Daniel Melcher	1976	President, R.R. Bowker Company; chairman Gale Research Company, and trustee, Montclair Public Library.
Mary U. Rothrock	1976	Supervisor, Tennessee Valley Authority libraries, President, Tennessee Library Association and Southeastern Library Association, President, American Library Association.
Jesse H. Shera	1976	President, Association for Library and Information Science Education, library historian,Beta Phi Mu Award, Award of Merit - Association for Information Science and Technology.
Alex P. Allain	1975	Intellectual Freedom advocate, Founder Freedom to Read Foundation, chair Louisiana Library Association Intellectual Freedom Committee, liaison officer in the French Navy during World War II
Augusta Baker	1975	Coordinator of Children's Services at New York Public Library, storyteller, known for contributions to children's literature, especially regarding the portrayal of Black Americans. Storyteller-in-Residence University of South Carolina.
William O. Douglas	1975	U.S. Supreme Court Justice
Carl D. Perkins	1975	U.S. Congressman (D, KY)
No Award	1974	
Germaine Krettek	1973	Director. American Library Association, Washington Office 1957–1972, secured funding for rural library service authorized under the Library Services Act.
David Horace Clift	1972	Executive Director, American Library Association, President, Connecticut Library Association, U.S. Army, Office of Strategic Services during World War II.
Luther H. Evans	1972	Librarian of Congress and Director-General of UNESCO.
Charlemae Rollins	1972	Head librarian, children's department, Chicago Public Library, President, Association for Library Service to Children, winner of Coretta Scott King Award in 1971 for Black Troubadour: Langston Hughes
Frank Francis	1971	British Museum Director.
Ralph R. Shaw	1971	Director, U.S. National Agricultural Library, Dean, Rutgers University Department of Library and Information Science, Founder, Scarecrow Press
Elizabeth Homer Morton	1970	Founding director of the Canadian Library Association. Order of Canada, 1968.
No Awards	1968–1969	
Verner Warren Clapp	1967	Library of Congress- many positions including Acting Librarian of Congress, author, founder of the United Nations Library, President of the Council on Library Resources.
John E. Fogarty	1966	U.S. Congressman (D, RI).
No Award	1965	
Joseph Lewis Wheeler	1964	Director, Enoch Pratt Free Library, author Library War Service during World War I.
Edwin C. Austin	1963	Chicago Attorney, American Library Association Trustee
Keyes DeWitt Metcalf	1963	Director, Harvard Library, President, American Library Association, author.
John Miller Chancellor	1962	Committee on Library Extension, Adult Education Specialist, author- The Library in the TVA Adult Education Program;Helping Adults to Learn.
No Awards	1957–1961	
Lister Hill	1956	U.S. Senate (D, AL)
No Award	1955	
Charles Harvey Brown	1954	Director, Iowa State University Library, U.S. Navy, World War I, founder Association of College and Research Libraries president, American Library Association.
Linda A. Eastman	1954	Head Librarian, Cleveland Public Library, president of the American Library Association.
Carleton B. Joeckel	1954	Director, Berkeley Public Library, Captain in World War I-Silver Star, President, California Library Association and Michigan Library Association, Professor, University of Chicago Graduate Library School, author.
Carl Hastings Milam	1954	Executive Director, American Library Association, Library War Service in World War I, Director, United Nations Library.
No Award	1953	
Harry Miller Lydenberg	1952	Director, New York Public Library, President, American Library Association, author.
William Warner Bishop	1951	President, American Library Association, President, International Federation of Library Associations, advisor to the Vatican Library.
Helen E. Haines	1951	Author of Living with Books, editor, lecturer.
Robert MacDonald Lester	1951	Carnegie Foundation administrator.
Louis Round Wilson	1951	Dean, University of Chicago Graduate Library School-golden age of library education-. The Louis Round Wilson Library at the University of North Carolina named for him. President, American Library Association
No Award	1950	
David H. Stevens	1949	Professor, University of Chicago, Director, Humanities Division of the Rockefeller Foundation, Advisor to Chicago Mayor's Commission
No Awards	1946–1948	
Frederic G. Melcher	1945	"The greatest all-round bookman in the English-speaking world," President, R.R. Bowker, Originator Newbery Medal and Caldecott Medal for children's literature.
Halsey William Wilson	1945	Publisher, founder of the H. W. Wilson Company, creator of the Readers' Guide, the Cumulative Book Index, and the Book Review Digest.
No Awards	1943–1944	
Theodore S. Chapman	1942	American Library Association Attorney
Frederick Paul Keppel	1942	President, Carnegie Corporation
No Award	1941	
Frank Pierce Hill	1940	Director, Newark Public Library, Chief Librarian Brooklyn Public Library, President, American Library Association.
Herbert Putnam	1940	Librarian of Congress, Librarian, Boston Public Library, President, American Library Association.
John H. Finley	1939	Professor of Polities at Princeton University, and Commissioner of Education of the State of New York
Ross A. Collins	1938	U.S. Congressman (D, MO).
No Awards	1934–1937	
Richard Rogers Bowker	1933	Editor, Publishers Weekly and Harper's Magazine, and founder, R. R. Bowker Company.
William L. Clements	1933	"One of the great Americana collectors of his or any other generation.", est. Bay City Public Library, Benefactor to William L. Clements Library, University of Michigan.
Wilberforce Eames	1933	"Dean of American bibliographers,"Chief of the American History Division at the New York Public Library.
Charles Evans	1933	Founder of the American Library Association, Bibliographer-American Bibliography, Director Indianapolis Public Library
Daniel Berkeley Updike	1933	Printer who was "one of the finest representatives of the Arts and Crafts movement in American book arts," historian of typography, founder Merrymount Press, author of Printing Types: Their History, Forms and Use.
No Awards	1931–1932	
Elizabeth Sprague Coolidge	1930	Benefactor, worked with Library of Congress to construct Coolidge Auditorium.
Herbert Clark Hoover	1929	U.S. President, 1929–1933.
No Award	1928	
Charles Alexander Nelson	1927	Bibliographer, cataloger of the Astor Library
No Awards	1920–1926	
Frank A. Vanderlip	1919	Library War Council Chairman, Founder, Federal Reserve System, Founder, first Montessori school in the United States,
No Awards	1900–1918	
Andrew Carnegie	1899	Industrialist and philanthropist. Funded 1,681 public library buildings in 1,412 U.S. communities between 1889 and 1923.
Bishop John H. Vincent	1898	Founder, Chautauqua Institution
No Awards	1896–1897	
Willard Fiske, Daniel Coit Gilman, Edwin H. Grant, S. Hastings Grant, Reuben Aldridge Guild, Edward Everett Hale, Ezekiel A. Harris, Charles W. Jencks, and Anson Judd Upson.	1895	At the 1895 conference "all survivors of the Librarians Convention of 1853" were elected to honorary membership.
No Award	1894	
Henry Barnard	1893	U.S. Commissioner of Education.
No Awards	1880–1892	
Frederick O. Prince	1879	Mayor of Boston, Trustee and President, Boston Public Library advocated and oversaw construction of the library's McKim Building in Copley Square.
Charles William Eliot	1879	President, Harvard University
