= Major Owens =

American politician (1936–2013)

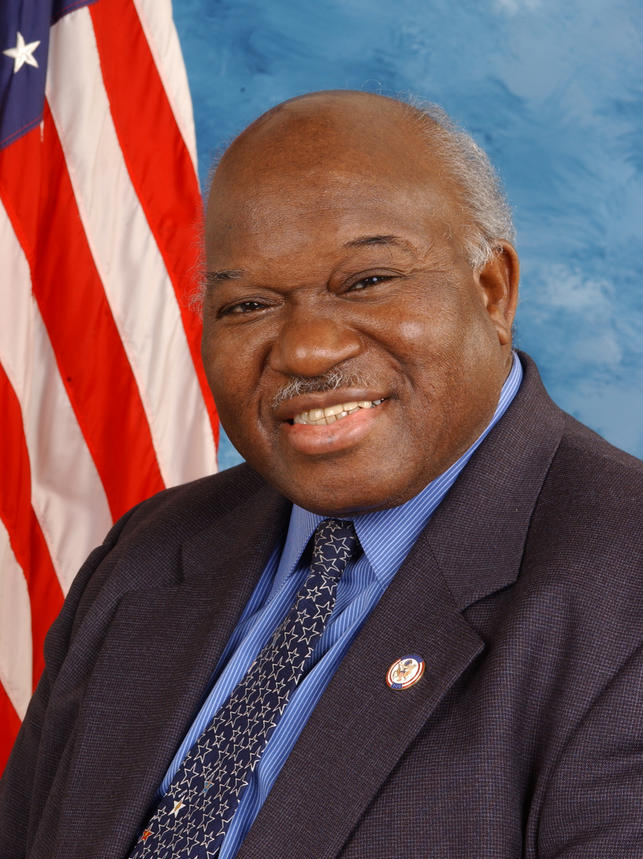
- Official portrait of Owens

Member of the U.S. House of Representatives from New York
- In office January 3, 1983 – January 3, 2007
- Preceded by: Shirley Chisholm
- Succeeded by: Yvette Clarke
- Constituency: 12th district (1983–1993); 11th district (1993–2007)

Member of the New York State Senate from the 17th district
- In office January 1, 1975 – December 31, 1982
- Preceded by: Chester J. Straub
- Succeeded by: Howard E. Babbush

Personal details
- Born: Major Robert Odell Owens; June 28, 1936 Collierville, Tennessee, U.S.
- Died: October 21, 2013 (aged 77) New York City, New York, U.S.
- Party: Democratic
- Spouse(s): Ethel Werfel; Maria Cuprill
- Children: 5, including Geoffrey
- Education: Morehouse College (BA); Clark Atlanta University (MS)
- Owens's voice Owens supporting the Embassy Employee Compensation Act. Recorded May 21, 2002

Major Robert Odell Owens (June 28, 1936 – October 21, 2013) was an American politician and librarian who served in the United States House of Representatives from 1983 to 2007, representing the New York's 11th and then 12th congressional district. He was first elected to succeed Representative Shirley Chisholm. Owens shepherded the Americans with Disabilities Act of 1990 through the House. He retired at the end of his term in January 2007 and was succeeded by Yvette Clarke.

== Early life and education ==
Owens was born on June 28, 1936, in Collierville, Tennessee, to Ezekiel and Edna Owens. He was raised in Memphis, Tennessee, and his father worked in a furniture factory as a laborer. He received a bachelor's degree in 1956 from Morehouse College, and a master's degree in library science in 1957 from Atlanta University, now known as Clark Atlanta.

== Career ==
=== Librarian ===
Owens began his career in librarianship. After obtaining his master's degree, Owens settled in Brooklyn, New York and began his career as a librarian at the Brooklyn Public Library from 1958 through the late 1960s. At the same time, Owens became active in the Congress of Racial Equality and other community groups. Owens, a community information librarian, became known for "placing Brooklyn Public Library collections in public places such as laundromats, stores, bars, and anywhere people gathered." In 1969, Owens worked with a group of other New York librarians, including Miriam Braverman, Anne Littlejohn, Betty-Carol Sellen, Joan Marshall, Hardy R. Franklin, Pat Schuman, Andrew Armitage, and Mitch Freedman, to establish the New York Social Responsibilities Round Table. This organization became part of the New York Library Association and its mission was "to create a central position for libraries and librarians in the battles for civil rights, social justice, peace, and ever-improved public access to education and information."

Although having moved from his career in librarianship into his political career, in 1979 and 1991, Owens was a featured speaker at the White House Conference on Libraries sponsored by the National Commission on Libraries and Information Science. In 1987, Owens was awarded the American Library Association Honorary Membership, its highest honor.

=== Politics ===
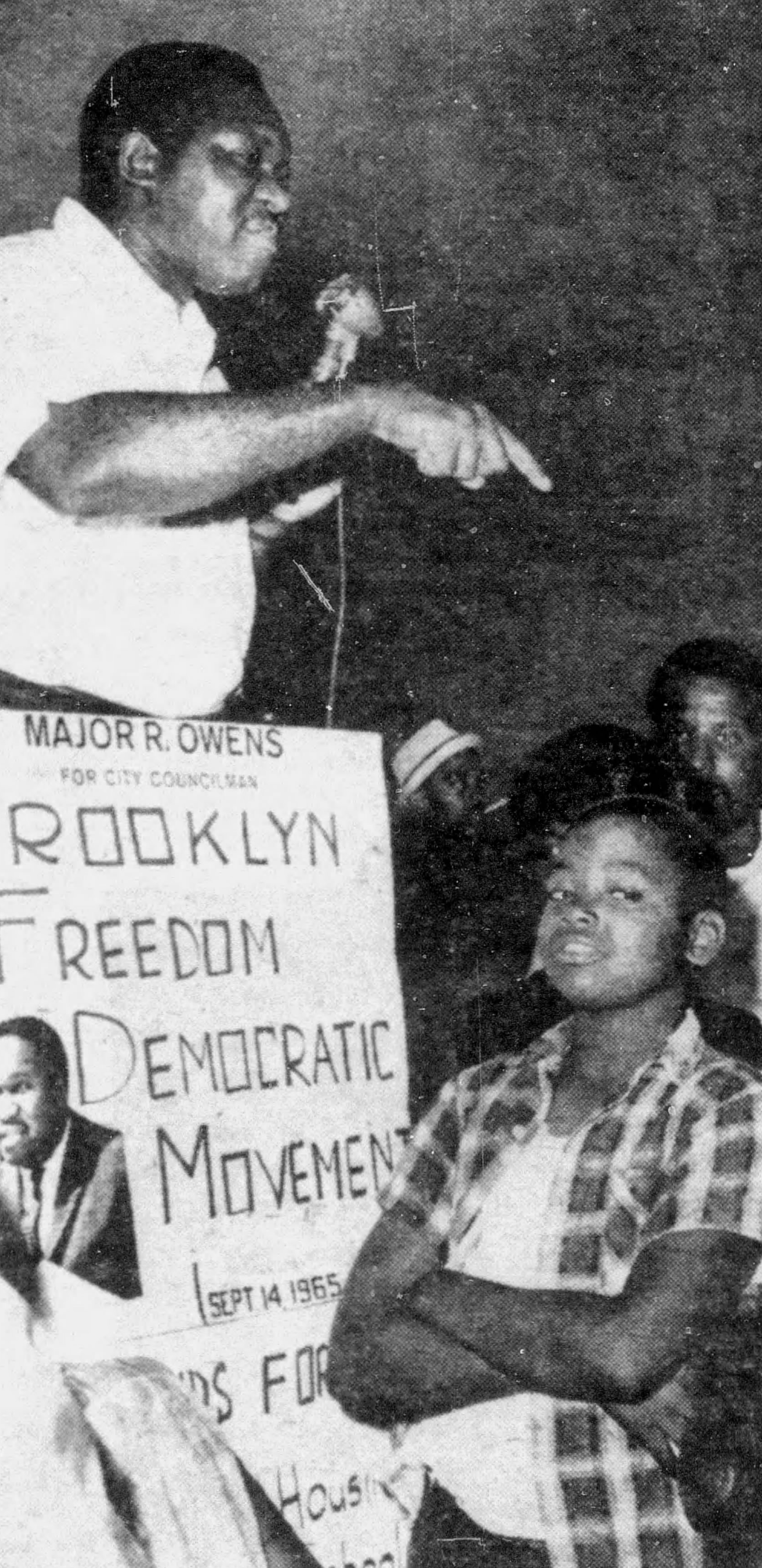
Owens campaigns for New York City Council, July 1965

In 1968, New York City mayor John Lindsay made Owens the commissioner of New York City's Community Development Agency. After serving in this position for approximately five years, he successfully ran for and was elected to the New York Senate. He was a member of the New York State Senate from 1975 to 1982, sitting in the 181st, 182nd, 183rd and 184th New York State Legislatures.

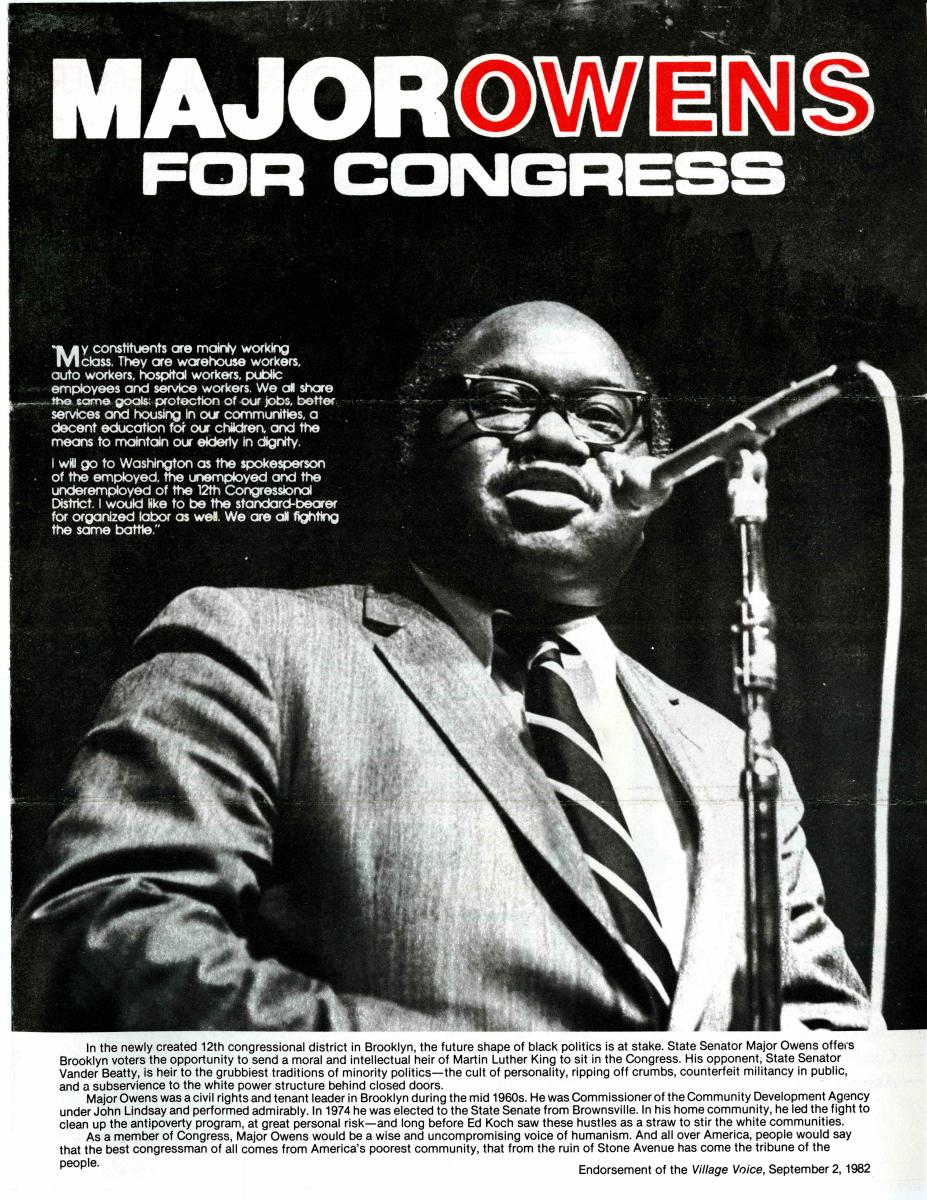
Campaign flyer, 1982

In 1982, he was elected to the U.S. House of Representatives, replacing the retiring Shirley Chisholm, where he remained until his retirement in 2006. Owens became known as "The Librarian In Congress." Owens's career in Congress is marked by his advocacy for and support of library funding and education issues; in particular public libraries, school libraries, and librarianship. In Congress, he worked closely with American Disability activist Justin Whitlock Dart who often was visiting his office in Capitol Hill and provided testimony before Owen's Subcommittee on Select Education in the House, during the late 1980s and early 1990s, prior to the passage of the ADA when it was being heatedly debated. Owens served as floor manager of the Americans with Disabilities Act (ADA) and aided in its enactment.

Owens represented a diverse district located within Brooklyn, New York, which included many African-Americans, Hispanic-Americans and Jewish Americans, including a large Hasidic Jewish community. His district included low income areas of Brownsville, a large Hasidic area of Crown Heights, the heavily Caribbean areas of Flatbush and East Flatbush, and the now upscale neighborhood of Park Slope. Although Owens won the 2004 Democratic primary with just 45.44% of the vote, he was re-elected in the 2004 general election with 94% of the vote. In 2006, Owens decided to retire at the end of his term (January 2007). In the 2006 election, Yvette Clarke, who had run against Owens in the 2004 primary, won the election and became Owens successor.

Owens was one of 31 House Democrats who voted to not count the 20 electoral votes from Ohio in the 2004 United States presidential election. Republican president George W. Bush won Ohio by 118,457 votes. Without Ohio's electoral votes, the election would have been decided by the U.S. House of Representatives, with each state having one vote in accordance with the Twelfth Amendment to the United States Constitution.

He was a member of the Congressional Progressive Caucus. He received an "A" on the Drum Major Institute's 2005 Congressional Scorecard on middle-class issues.

=== Later career ===
In 2006, Owens decided to not pursue re-election and retired from Congress, thereby ending his political career. Owens indicated that he wanted to spend his time writing novels and poetry. In 2006 after Owens's retirement decision, the Librarian of Congress announced that Owens would be appointed as a distinguished visiting scholar at the John W. Kluge Center with the position to commence in January 2007. During his time at the John W. Kluge Center, Owens's work focused "on a case study of the Congressional Black Caucus and its impact on national politics." Owens used his time at the Kluge Center to research and write his book The Peacock Elite: A Subjective Case Study of the Congressional Black Caucus and Its Impact on National Politics, which was published in 2011. Owens served as a senior fellow for the DuBois-Bunche Center for Public Policy at Medgar Evers College.

== Personal life ==
Owens was married twice. His first marriage to Ethel Werfel ended in divorce after twenty-five years. From his marriage to Ethel, Owens had three sons: Brooklyn politician Chris Owens, actor Geoffrey Owens (best known for playing "Elvin" on The Cosby Show), and Millard Owens. He then married Maria A. Cuprill (Maria Owens), and the couple had two children.

Owens died October 21, 2013 in New York City of congestive heart failure. He was 77.

== See also ==
- List of African-American United States representatives

U.S. House of Representatives
Preceded by Shirley Chisholm	Member of the U.S. House of Representatives from New York's 12th congressional district 1983–1993	Succeeded by Nydia Velázquez
Preceded by Edolphus Towns	Member of the U.S. House of Representatives from New York's 11th congressional district 1993–2007	Succeeded by Yvette Clarke
