= Marilyn Miller (disambiguation) =

Marilyn Miller (1898–1936) was an American Broadway musical actress.

Marilyn Miller may also refer to:

- Marilyn Miller (dancer), Aboriginal Australian dancer and arts administrator, daughter of Pat O'Shane and Mick Miller
- Marilyn Suzanne Miller (born 1950), American television writer and producer
- Marilyn T. Miller, American pediatric ophthalmologist
- Marilyn L. Miller (1930–2014), American librarian and educator

== See also ==
- Marilyn Monroe (1926–1962), American actress, model, and singer, married to Arthur Miller
