= Ralph E. Ellsworth =

American librarian and author

Ralph E. Ellsworth (September 22, 1907 – November 12, 2000) was an American academic librarian, educator, and author known for his writing about library architecture, administration, and professional leadership.

He is the only person elected twice as president of the Association of College and Research Libraries (ACRL), serving in 1951–1952 and 1961–1962. He was awarded American Library Association Honorary Membership in 1988.

== Education and Career ==
Ellsworth was born in Forest City, Iowa. He earned a B.A. from Oberlin College (1929), a B.S. in library science from Western Reserve University, and a Ph.D. from the University of Chicago Graduate Library School in 1937.

His first position was librarian at Adams State College in Alamosa, Colorado.

In 1937, he was appointed Director of Libraries and Professor of Bibliography at the University of Colorado Boulder. He oversaw substantial collection growth and designed the innovative Norlin Library, which opened in 1940 as the largest library building between Chicago and the West Coast. The facility featured divisional reading rooms, fluorescent lighting, and a deliberate design to function as a central teaching instrument integrated with campus academic life.

From 1943 to 1958, Ellsworth served as Director of Libraries at the University of Iowa. He designed a new main library building (completed in 1951).

A plan for the Center for Research Libraries (originally named the Midwest Inter-Library Center) was developed by Ellsworth, Errett Weir McDiarmid and Herman H. Fussler in 1948.

In 1958, Ellsworth returned to the University of Colorado as Director of Libraries until his retirement in 1972. He consulted widely on library architecture and lectured internationally on library design.

The Ralph E. Ellsworth Award was established in 1990 in honor of Ellsworth as an annual internal award from the University Libraries at the University of Colorado Boulder to recognize library faculty for outstanding contributions to the Libraries, the university, and the profession.

== Professional activities ==
Ellsworth was an advocate for greater autonomy for the Association of College and Research Libraries within the American Library Association during reorganization debates in the 1940s and early 1960s. He was twice elected president of the Association of College and Research Libraries serving in 1951–1952 and 1961–1962.

In 1982 the festschrift, Academic Librarianship: Yesterday, Today, and Tomorrow, was dedicated to Ellsworth and includes a bibliography of works by and about him.

He was awarded American Library Association Honorary Membership in 1988.

== Selected publications ==
- Ellsworth, Ralph E.; Kilpatrick, Norman L. (April 1948). "Midwest Reaches for the Stars". College & Research Libraries. 9 (2): 136–144.
- Ellsworth, Ralph E. (1968). Planning the College and University Library Building: A Book for Campus Planners and Architects. Boulder, CO: Pruett Press.
- Ellsworth, Ralph E. (1969). The Economics of Book Storage in College and University Libraries. Washington, DC: Association of Research Libraries. ISBN 0-8108-0297-X.
- Ellsworth, Ralph E. (1973). Planning Manual for Academic Library Buildings. Metuchen, NJ: Scarecrow Press. ISBN 0-8108-0680-0.
- Ellsworth, Ralph E. (1980). Ellsworth on Ellsworth: An Unchronological, Mostly True Account of Some Moments of Contact between “Library Science” and Me, since Our Confluence in 1931. Metuchen, NJ: Scarecrow Press. ISBN 0-8108-1311-4. - via ProQuest
