= Helen E. Haines =

American librarian (1872–1961)

- Born: February 9, 1872; New York City
- Died: August 26, 1961; Altadena
- Occupations: Librarian, writer
- Employer: R. R. Bowker
- Awards: Joseph W. Lippincott Award (1951); American Library Association Honorary Membership (1951)

Helen Elizabeth Haines (February 9, 1872–August 26, 1961) was an American writer, reviewer, teacher and lecturer. She was instrumental in the development of the library science profession, though she herself never worked as a librarian or earned a professional degree. Helen Haines is best known within the library community as the author of Living with Books, which served as one of the leading texts on book selection and readers' advisory. In addition, Haines dedicated her career to combatting against literary censorship and promoting intellectual freedom as a hallmark of the library profession. Born in the late Victorian period as the eldest of five girls and educated privately, she worked in publishing after being turned down for a library job. As a protégée of Charles Cutter, she became the managing editor of Library Journal in 1896. She also served as an officer of the American Library Association. In 1906, however, her health broke down, and she eventually had to leave both positions and relocate to southern California. For her service to librarianship, Andrew Carnegie awarded her an annual pension.

== Early life ==
Helen Elizabeth Haines was born in New York City on February 9, 1872. The daughter of Benjamin Reeve and Mary E. Haines, Helen received a private education.

== Career ==
Haines published her first work at 19, a history of New Mexico. In 1892, at the age of 21, she began her career within the library profession after working first as a secretary and then as an assistant editor under R.R. Bowker, the publisher of both Library Journal and Publishers' Weekly. Initially working under the supervision of Charles Ammi Cutter, Haines became the journal's managing editor in 1896. Her work was intimately connected to that of the American Library Association, and some of her main responsibilities included preparing the proceedings for the ALA. Indeed, by 1906, Haines was elected the second vice president of ALA, however, in 1907, when she was 35 years old, she contracted tuberculosis. As a result of her illness she was forced to take a 6-year break from all work except reading. It was at this time that Haines moved to Southern California to be with her sister who was working at the State Library of California.

She was a member of the Council of American Library Association and editor of its proceedings for ten years. From 1914 to 1926 she was a member of the faculty of the Library School of the Los Angeles Public Library; she gave courses in book selection for the School of Librarianship of the University of California. She was a contributor to the Saturday Review of Literature, The Bookman, New York Herald-Tribune, and more; she gave many annual series of lectures on books for the L. A. Public Library, Pasadena Public Library and Long Beach Public Library, and also for the Extension Dept. of the University of California. She compiled and edited various Bibliograph publications, including "American Catalogue" (1890–95) and "Annual Literary Index". She was a member of the American Library Association, California Library Association, Pasadena Library Club, Woman's Civic League of Pasadena, Friday Morning Club of Los Angeles.

Haines recovered her health and established herself as a library educator, writer, and activist in two key areas: support for popular fiction and for intellectual freedom. In 1935, she published Living with Books: The Art of Book Selection, which became a definitive library school text. One contemporary review, while praising Haines' "shrewd and discriminating observation, … acute and illuminating criticism," nevertheless complained that "there is a fearful lot of junk in some of her suggested lists of books". Perhaps the review was objecting to Haines' eclectic tastes; in a 1924 article, for instance, she advocated for "a rounded and representative collection, for readers of varied tastes, sophisticated as well as simple". In her annotated bibliography of Haines' work, Mary Robinson Sive notes that likewise, Haines' 1942 work What's in a Novel "did not receive unqualified critical acclaim because of its disregard of purely literary criteria".

She had a larger agenda that included everyone, even Black Americans, an idea that was controversial at the time of her writing. Haines’ “ideas about race relations and sex education were decades ahead of their time.” She believed a public library should indeed be public, and that they should promote education through reading. Haines was a strong believer and advocate for intellectual freedom, and “as a believer in the free exchange of ideas, she wore a bulls-eye on her back." In 1947, Los Angeles County demanded that all civil servants, including librarians, sign loyalty oaths or be branded as "probable communist subversives". Haines protested the order and urged the ALA to do the same. When they didn't take action against the decree, Haines took matters into her own hands by rewriting the ALA's Library Bill of Rights stating, "All patrons should have free access to books regardless of the author's race, nationality, religious beliefs or political ideas".

Haines continued to write widely and to advocate for libraries to feature modern fiction and a broad collection. Her career, however, became mired in controversy when she published a second edition of Living with Books in 1950. Initial reviewers were positive about this edition, which was explicit in its opposition to censorship. In the popular press, however, Haines was denounced as pro-Soviet because of her strong advocacy of the aforementioned intellectual freedom and her openness to works considered controversial. As Haines was largely undefended by others in the profession, she withdrew into retirement. She received the Joseph W. Lippincott Award in 1951 but ceased publishing. In 1951 she was awarded American Library Association Honorary Membership. She died in 1961.

== Personal life ==
She lived in Brooklyn, New York, and moved to California in 1908. She lived at 1175 North Mentor Avenue, Pasadena, California.

== Selected writings ==
=== Books ===
- What's in a novel (1942, Columbia University Press)
- Living with books: the art of book selection (1935, Columbia University Press)
- Glance again at the public libraries 1928)
- New lamps for old... (1899, Pennsylvania Library Club)

=== Journal articles ===
- Haines, H. E. (January 1, 1909). Library periodicals. Bulletin of Bibliography, 6, 2–5.

== Quotes ==
"From every book invisible threads reach out to other books, and as the mind comes to use and control those threads the whole panorama of the world's life, past and present, becomes constantly more varied and interesting." -Living With Books: the art of book selection (1935, Columbia University Press)

"All who care for books will possess some friends and intimates whose companionship cannot be restricted to a formal and limited visit."

== Quotes by other writers about Helen E. Haines ==
"In an increasingly virtual world, Haines's writing also serves to remind us that the library is a rare point of human contact for many of our users."
