= Betty J. Turock =

American librarian and educator (born 1936)

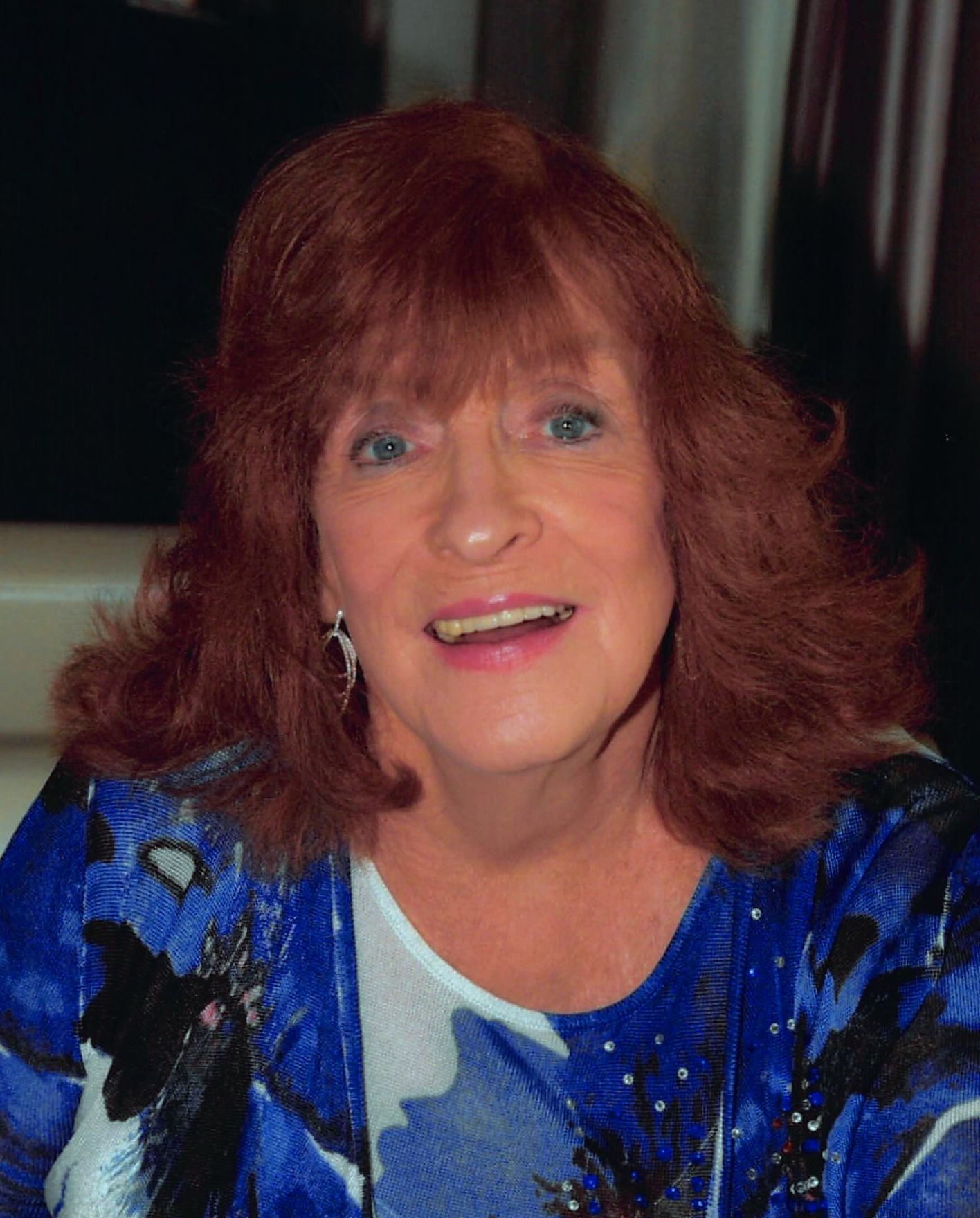
- Turock in 2017

President of the American Library Association
- In office 1995–1996
- Preceded by: Arthur Curley
- Succeeded by: Mary R. Somerville

Personal details
- Born: June 12, 1933 (age 93) Scranton, Pennsylvania, United States
- Spouse(s): Frank M. Turock (m. 1956, died 2005); Gus W. Friedrich (m. 2010)
- Children: David L. and B. Drew Turock
- Education: Syracuse University; Rutgers University
- Occupation: Librarian, educator
- Website: comminfo.rutgers.edu/turock-betty-j

Betty J. Turock is an American librarian and educator who served as president of the American Library Association from 1995 to 1996. She was a member of the faculty of the Rutgers School of Communication and Information for 22 years. Turock is best known for her advocacy for equity of access to electronic information via the Internet as well as for championing diversity in the library profession.

== Early life and education ==
Betty J. Turock was born in Scranton, Pennsylvania on June 12, 1936.

A child during the Great Depression, she was raised by her aunt and uncle Ruth (Sweetser) and David Argust, Jr. who had no children of their own. A surveyor, then mining engineer for the Hudson Coal Company, David was employed throughout the years of the historic economic downturn.

Turock graduated from Keystone Junior College in 1953 and received her bachelor’s degree from Syracuse University in 1955 (both Magna Cum Laude). She earned her Master of Library Science degree from Rutgers University during the social ferment of the late 1960’s and early 1970’s and a Ph.D. in Library and Information Science in 1981 also from Rutgers.

== Career ==
As the wife of a corporate nomad employed by AT&T’s Western Electric, Turock learned that time spent as a family in any local was indefinite. She began her career during her short-lived time in Raritan Township, NJ where she served on the initial Library Board of Trustees and was Chairman of the Education and Community Affairs Committee of the Woman’s Club where she started a scholarship program for high school students who aspired to go to college.

In 1963, she was appointed then elected to serve on the Raritan Township Board of Education becoming the only woman on the board. Her background in education, information, and community support contributed to the advancement of the entire school system. In 1966, Turock was honored with the “Woman of the Year” award by the Woman’s Club for her leading voice representing women on Raritan Township Board of Education, raising scholarship funds, implementing new policies, and for creating a better relationship between the board and the general public.

Turock’s husband was then relocated to Winston-Salem, North Carolina where she became the Head Librarian for the East Winston and Kernersville branches of the Forsyth County system headquarters in Winston Salem.

Until two years before she arrived at East Winston it was a segregated library for Blacks only. Here she learned that separate and equal did not exist, but separate and unequal did.Because of its history few people used East Winston. She enlisted members of the Black Panthers to help bring the library back in touch with its community. In an interview with Versed, the Bulletin of ALA’s Office for Diversity, Turock referred to her experience in Winston Salem as “deepening her appreciation for what the public library can do with equity at the heart of its mission.” In a 2017 speech to ALA’s Leadership Academy she amplified that message by remarking:

It was in East Winston I learned that even when we can’t predict the consequences, we must mix the library with the soul of the community to supply new directions in services desperately needed by emerging majority populations.

Turock held a number of managerial positions in school, public and academic libraries, including serving as Director of the Montclair Public Library, where she worked to "make the library an activist community center" and as Assistant Director of the Rochester and Monroe County New York Library System. She was appointed as Senior Advisor in the U.S. Department of Education's Office of Educational Research and Improvement. Turock shifted from library administration to educating future librarians upon completing her Ph.D. when she was invited to join the faculty of the Department of Library and Information Science in the newly formed Rutgers School of Communication, Information and Library Science. She served as the department chair from 1989 to 1995 and again from 2001 to 2002. From 2002 until her retirement in 2003 she was the Associate Dean of the School.

Dr. Turock has authored over 100 books, articles, and reports, and was the founding editor of The Bottom Line, a journal dedicated to the study of library finances. Her books include Evaluating Federally Funded Library Programs (1990), Serving the Older Adult: A Guide to Library Programs and Information Sources(1992), and Envisioning a Nation Connected: Librarians Define the Public Interest in the Information Superhighway (1996). She has lectured and worked as a consultant in the United States, Russia, India, China, Taiwan, and the U.S. Virgin Islands.

== ALA presidency ==
=== Equity of Access to Electronic Information ===
After serving in multiple leadership positions within the American Library Association, Turock was elected president, from 1995 to 1996. She focused national attention on the digital divide between the information rich and the information poor and promoted libraries as publicly funded points for access to electronic technologies for all regardless of their economic status James H. Billington, then Librarian of Congress, referred to her as “the Paul Revere of the Information Age." When the Telecommunications Act was up for renewal for the first time in 30 years, she testified before Congress and the Federal Communications Commission (FCC) to advocate for libraries as just and equitable sources of access. The Congress voted to pass the updated Act with libraries designated as points of Universal Services like the post office. As a result, the “E-Rate was established for schools and public libraries. Today, the E-Rate program funding is based on demand up to an annual Commission-established $3.9 billion, adjusted annually on the rate of inflation.”

During Turock’s time as president of the American Library Association she worked closely with Senator Paul Simon (ALA Honorary Member, 1996) and Jeanne Hurley Simon, chair of the National Commission on Libraries and Information Science (ALA Honorary Member, 2000) on the legislative policies that created the Institute of Museums and Library Services (1996). She oversaw implementation of the American Library Association’s Office for Information Technology Policy with Elizabeth Martinez (Executive Director of ALA (1996).

=== Diversity in the Library Profession ===
A prominent goal of Turock's presidency, announced when she was a candidate for office, was to increase diversity and equity within ALA. E.J. Josey, a mentor to her often said with disdain, "ALA appoints one minority Fellow a year. In 50 years we'll have 50 minority Fellows and they call that progress.”

When elected she held a series of mini-Summits, composed of representatives from all ALA caucuses, racial and ethnic affiliates, that produced a position paper in which a diversity initiative was outlined to replace ALA’s sporadic interest with long term commitment. Recruiting and funding the education of at least fifty students from racial and ethnic emerging majority populations each year became a part of ALA’s agenda for action. Turock’s efforts, along with those of then-ALA Executive Director Elizabeth Martinez, resulted in the formation of ALA's Spectrum Initiative, including the Spectrum Scholarship Program, which continues to fund members of underrepresented students to attend library and information science programs for their master’s degrees.

Spectrum’s initial approval did not mean the life of the scholarships program was secure. Turock became the fundraising leader of ALA campaigns during its formative years. She worked with the Endowment Trustees to ensure their vote for using $1million for Spectrum. Sarah Long, ALA President 1999 to 2000 turn to Dr. Turock to chair the campaign that would create the Spectrum Endowment. When ALA sold one of its Chicago buildings she asked equity legend, E.J. Josey, to join her in petitioning the Executive Board, led by Carla Hayden, ALA President 2003 to 2004, Librarian of Congress (2016 - 2025), to appropriate $1million from the sale to Spectrum.

Hayden’s Executive Board voted affirmatively. At the 2009 ALA Conference, ALA President Camila Alire (2009-2010), Immediate Past President, Jim Rettig,(2008-2009) and President-Elect Roberta Stevens (2010-2011) announced the Spectrum Presidential Initiative to raise another $1 million to ensure continued funding for the Spectrum Scholars and the Endowment that supported them. Turock chaired this campaign also, which exceeded its goal and raised $1.23 million. Annually the Turock Family Foundation funds one Spectrum Scholarship.

=== The Summit: A Nation Connected ===
The centerpiece of Turock’s year, “Envisioning a Nation Connected”, brought a nationally renowned panel of 20 experts from the public and private sectors together with 30 library leaders, to define the public interest in the information superhighway and its effect on libraries and library service for the future. The summit in February 1996 was hosted by the Annenberg Center for Health Sciences. Funding was provided in part by the John D. and Catherine T. MacArthur Foundation and the W.K. Kellogg Foundation.

=== New Jersey Library Association Equity Initiative ===
In 2022, Turock worked alongside the Executive Board of the New Jersey Library Association, Kate Jaggers (President of the NJLA, 2022), and Tracie Hall (Executive Director of ALA, 2022) on the creation of the New Jersey Library Association Equity Initiative. The program was developed because the number of students exceeded the scholarships available offered by Spectrum. Since their initiation, NJLA has awarded 32 equity scholarships and has spent a total of $272,000 in funding through the collaboration of NJLA, NJ State Library, and LibraryLinkNJ.

== Selected publications ==
- Turock, Betty. (2024). "At a Crossroads." American Libraries 55 (1/2): 6.
- Turock, Betty J. (2003). "Diversity: A Necessity." Library Journal 128 (20): 10.
- Turock, Betty J. (2001). "Women and Leadership." Journal of Library Administration 32 (3/4): 111–32.
- Turock, Betty J. (1996). "Diversity Reclaimed." American Libraries 27 (March): 25.
- Turock, Betty J. (1996). Envisioning a Nation Connected : Librarians Define the Public Interest in the Information Superhighway. Chicago: American Library Association.
- Turock, Betty J, and Carol C Henderson. (1996) "A Model for a New Approach to Federal Government Information Access and Dissemination." Journal of Government Information an International Review of Policy, Issues and Resources. 23, no. 3: 227–40.
- Turock, Betty J. and United States Office of Educational Research and Improvement. (1990). Library Programs: Evaluating Federally Funded Public Library Programs. Washington D.C: Office of Educational Research and Improvement U.S. Dept. of Education
- Turock, Betty J. (1987). "Public Library Service for Older Adults: Update 1984." Library Quarterly 57 (April): 137–70.
- Turock, Betty J.(1986) The Public Library in the Bibliographic Network.1986; 2021. New York: Haworth.
- Turock, Betty J. (1982). Serving the Older Adult: A Guide to Library Programs and Information Sources. New York: Bowker.
- Turock Betty J (1981) Public Library Services for Aging in the Eighties : A 1981 White House Conference on Aging Background Paper. New Brunswick N.J: Rutgers University Graduate School of Library and Information Studies.

== Awards and honors ==
In 2017, Keystone College renamed their School of Arts and Sciences to the Turock School of Arts and Sciences in honor of Betty Turock, her son David L. Turock, and her late husband, Frank M. Turock to recognize their decades of support. The family received Keystone's Presidential Medallion in 2000.

Turock has received numerous awards, including American Library Association Honorary Membership, the Association's highest honor, conferred for contribution to librarianship that it is so outstanding that it is of lasting importance to the advancement of the whole field of library service. In 2000, ALA honored her an Extraordinary Library Advocates of the Twentieth Century. Other honors received include:

- ALA Jesse Shera Award for Outstanding Research (1989)
- Rutgers University Distinguished Alumna Award (1994)
- New Jersey Library Leadership Award (1995)
- Rutgers Presidential Award for Distinguished Public Service (1997)
- American Library Association Equality Award (1998)
- Joseph W. Lippincott Award (2006)
- Rutgers Graduate School Distinguished Alumni Award (2011)
- American Library Association Honorary Membership (2011).
- Honorary Lifetime Membership in American Library Association (2012)
- New Jersey Library Association President’s Award (2023)
- New Jersey Library Association Lifetime Achievement Award (2025)
