= Montclair Public Library =

- Location: Montclair, New Jersey, US
- Established: 1869
- Branches: 2

Collection
- Size: 201,688

Access and use
- Circulation: 441,649
- Population served: 38,021
- Members: 30,413

Other information
- Budget: $3,418,043
- Director: Radwa Ali
- Employees: 36 FTE
- Website: montclairlibrary.org

- Montclair Public Library - Bellevue Avenue Branch
- U.S. National Register of Historic Places
- New Jersey Register of Historic Places
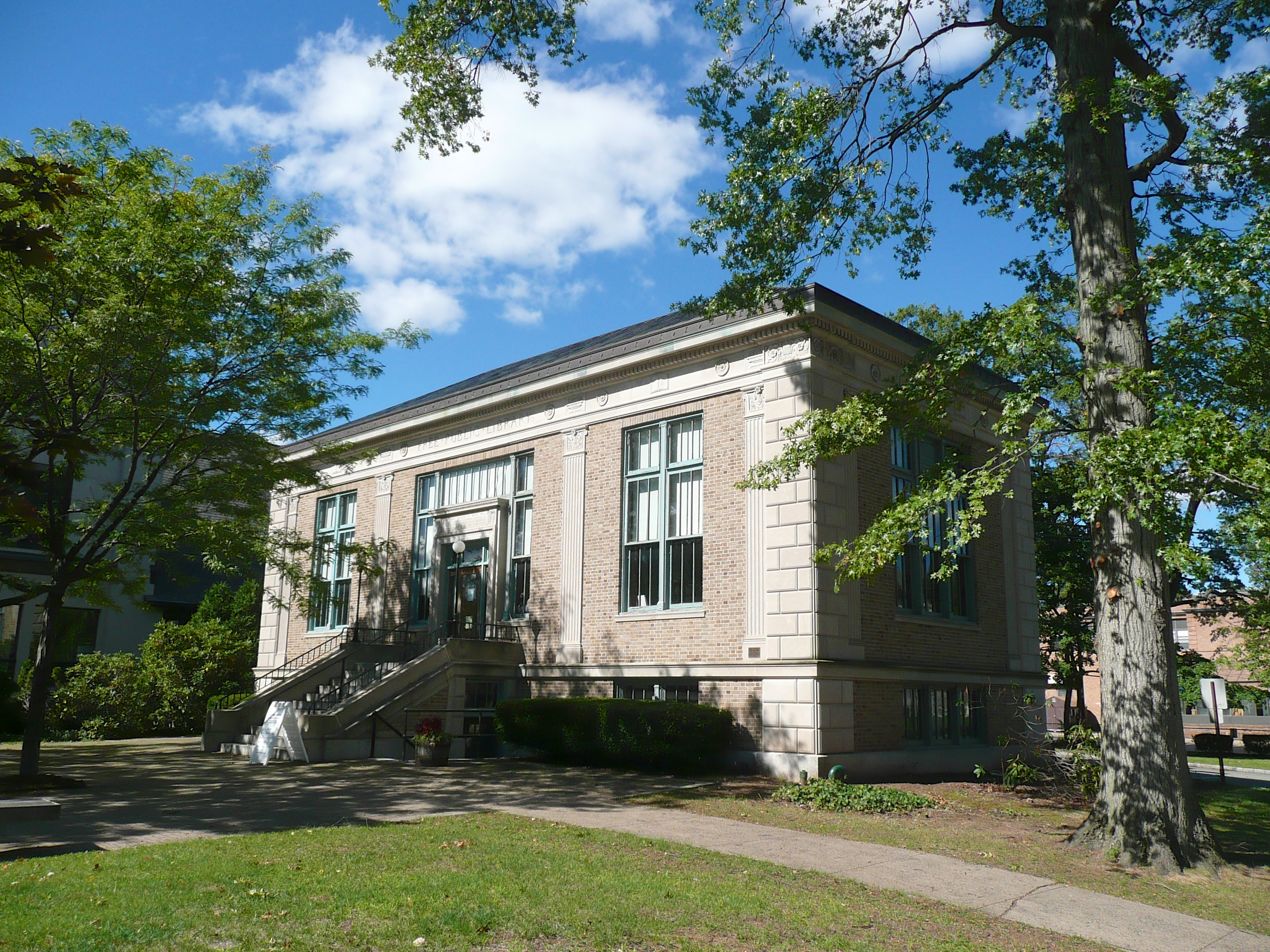

- Location within Essex County, New Jersey Location within New Jersey Location within the United States
- Location: 185 Bellevue Avenue, Montclair, New Jersey
- Coordinates: 40°50′29″N 74°12′19″W
- Area: less than one acre
- Built: 1925
- Architect: F.A. Nelson
- Architectural style: Classical Revival, Institutional
- MPS: Montclair MRA
- NRHP reference No.: 86003076
- NJRHP No.: 1189

Significant dates
- Added to NRHP: July 1, 1988
- Designated NJRHP: September 29, 1986

The Montclair Public Library is the public library for the township of Montclair located in Essex County, New Jersey, United States. It serves the residents from two buildings, the Main Library and the Bellevue Avenue Branch. It is a member of Bridging Communities, Connecting Library Services.

== History ==
The Montclair Public Library had its beginnings with the founding of the Montclair Library Association, a 30-person subscription-based organization started by Israel Crane in 1869. On April 12, 1893, citizens of Montclair voted to establish a free public library. It was housed on the second floor of Dr. John J.H. Love's office at 16 Church Street. Mary F. Weeks served as the first library director, until 1897. An abandoned inn (called Munn Tavern) was purchased and became the new home for the library in 1898.

A branch was established in 1899 in a rented room in the real estate office of John Mancini on Bellevue Avenue, near the Upper Montclair train station.

The first building constructed solely for the library was completed in 1904 with $40,000 from the Carnegie Corporation. This building at 73 Church Street served as the main library for 50 years. This building is now part of the Unitarian Church, located at the intersection of Valley Road and Church Street.

In 1913, the Carnegie Corporation gave Montclair a second sum of $40,000 for the construction of the Bellevue Avenue Branch. Designed by the architect Francis A. Nelson, the branch opened on December 26, 1914.

In 1927, Margery Quigley became the sixth director of the library. Her book Portrait of a Library OCLC 1750291, co-authored with William Marcus, the library board president, was revolutionary for changing the concept of public libraries from that of a place for quiet reading to that of a dynamic information center. It drew the attention of Director Hans Burger, who developed a film of the same name in 1940, which was distributed by the Museum of Modern Art and shown throughout the world under the auspices of the U.S. Department of State. In February 1942, IBM (International Business Machines Corporation) designed the first ever punch card data processing system for the library, also making the first public library in the United States to have a computerized circulation system.

In 1955, the Davella Mills Foundation donated the former site of Dr. Love's home, whose offices served as the first library, as the site for the new library building. They also contributed $250,000 toward the $800,000 construction cost. Designed by Ralph Walker of Voorhees, Walker, Foley and Smith, it was noted for its large glass windows and an absence of internal load bearing walls.

In 1996 the Main Library closed for an extensive renovation and expansion, reopening a year later. In 2002 it was named one of the top five libraries in the nation by Library Journal.

In 2025, a major donation by jazz educator Peter Bodge led to the creation of the Peter Bodge & Seed Artists Jazz Library. This is a permanent circulating special collection within the library.

== Directors ==
- Mary F. Weeks (1893–1897)
- S. Augusta Smith (1897–1909)
- Katherine School (1909–1912)
- Helen M. Hereling (1912–1915)
- Alta M. Barker (1915–1927)
- Margery C. Quigley (1927–1956)
- Ruth P. Tubby (1956–1968)
- Arthur Curley (1968–1975)
- Betty J. Turock (1975–1977)
- Phillip M. Clark (1978)
- Ellen Foth (acting, December 1978 – April 1979)
- Michael L. Connell (1979–1999)
- Carol W. Robinson (acting, 1999–2000)
- Howard W. Curtis (2000–2001)
- Cheryl M. McCoy (acting, 2001; director, 2002–2006)
- Mary Lou Skillin (acting, 2006)
- David Hinkley (2006–2016)
- Peter Coyl (2017–2021)
- Janet Torsney (2022–2024)
- Radwa Ali (2024–present)

== Prominent staff members and trustees ==
- Margery C. Quigley (1927–1956) library director. Served on ALA Council and executive board, and winner of the 1941 Wilson Publicity Honor Roll
- William Elder Marcus Jr. (1921–1946) member of the board of trustees. Recipient of the inaugural 1941 ALA Trustee Citation and author of numerous articles on public library trustees, as well as served on the Library Public Relations Council.
- Dr. Lillian M. Gilbreath (1943–1953), member of the Board of Trustees
- Zoia Horn (1952–1954) librarian, advocate for intellectual freedom
- Arthur Curley (1968–1975), library director, later served as ALA president from 1994 to 1995.
- Ella Gaines Yates (1970–1972), assistant director, later served on ALA Executive Board and as president of the Freedom to Read Foundation
- Betty J. Turock (1975–1977) library director, later served as ALA president from 1995 to 1996
