= Ella Gaines Yates =

American librarian (1927–2006)

State Librarian of Virginia
- In office 1986–1990
- Preceded by: Donald Rucker Haynes
- Succeeded by: John C. Tyson

President of the Freedom to Read Foundation
- In office 1985–1986

Personal details
- Born: June 14, 1927 Atlanta, Georgia, U.S.
- Died: June 27, 2006 (aged 79)
- Education: Clark Atlanta University Spelman College
- Occupation: Librarian

Ella Gaines Yates (June 14, 1927 – June 27, 2006) was an American librarian who served as the first African-American director of the Atlanta-Fulton Public Library System in Georgia.

== Early life and education ==
Yates was born into a well known and wealthy family in Atlanta, Georgia. She attended Booker T. Washington High School. She was accepted to Spelman College on July 13, 1944. She wrote in her admission letter to the college, "I wish to come to Spelman, because I feel there is no other college anywhere in the world finer for a girl to receive training to prepare her for higher gain in life. I have always looked forward to entering Spelman College, because Spelman students have a certain air about them that denotes character and culture. I would naturally fall in line." Yates graduated with a bachelor's degree from Spelman in 1949. She met her husband, Clayton Yates, at Morehouse College.

== Career ==
Yates received an MLS degree from Atlanta University in 1951, and went on to be a prominent member of African-American librarianship. She was hired as the assistant branch librarian at the Brooklyn Public Library from 1951 to 1955. She then went to the Orange Public Library in New Jersey to become head of the children's department, East Orange Public Library a branch librarian, and Montclair Public Library as an assistant director from 1970 to 1972.

Yates was a member of the American Library Association (ALA) and the Black Caucus of ALA. She was a member of the NAACP, and helped found the Association's Coretta Scott King Book Award. She published an article entitled "Sexism in the Library Profession." She served as a research writer for the U.S. Civil Rights Commission, and was a member of the Delta Sigma Theta sorority. She created her own firm, Yates Library Consultants. She was a visiting professor at Atlanta University Graduate School of Library and Information Science from 1976 to 1981. Yates became the Atlanta Public Library's (later Atlanta-Fulton County Library) director in 1976, serving for five years.

Yates and her family moved to Seattle, Washington, where she established a Library and Learning Resource Center for the Seattle Opportunities Industrialization Center. She also began teaching at the University of Washington's Graduate Library School. She accepted a position as State Librarian of the Virginia State Library in 1986, as the first African-American and the first woman appointed to this position. Yates enjoyed this position, but her tenure was mired in controversy, and she was dismissed in 1990. She returned to the Atlanta-Fulton Public Library as interim director in 1998, but left the position on December 31 due to disputes with the library board.

Under her leadership, the Atlanta-Fulton Public Library built its central branch on Margaret Mitchell Square in downtown Atlanta. Yates saw the state-of-the-art facility through its planning and construction stages and presided at the May 1980 dedication ceremonies. She was the first African American librarian in the country to have a major metropolitan library built during her tenure.

She was so concerned about the city receiving a fair deal that she found time to earn a doctoral degree from Atlanta Law School in 1979 so she could understand contracts.

Yates expanded library services for the disabled, ethnic groups, and prisoners. She brought the library into the Fulton County Jail, making it the first penal institution in the country with a public library branch.

== Death ==
Yates died on June 27, 2006, of pancreatic cancer, at the age of 79.
