= Reuben Guild =

American librarian (1822–1899)

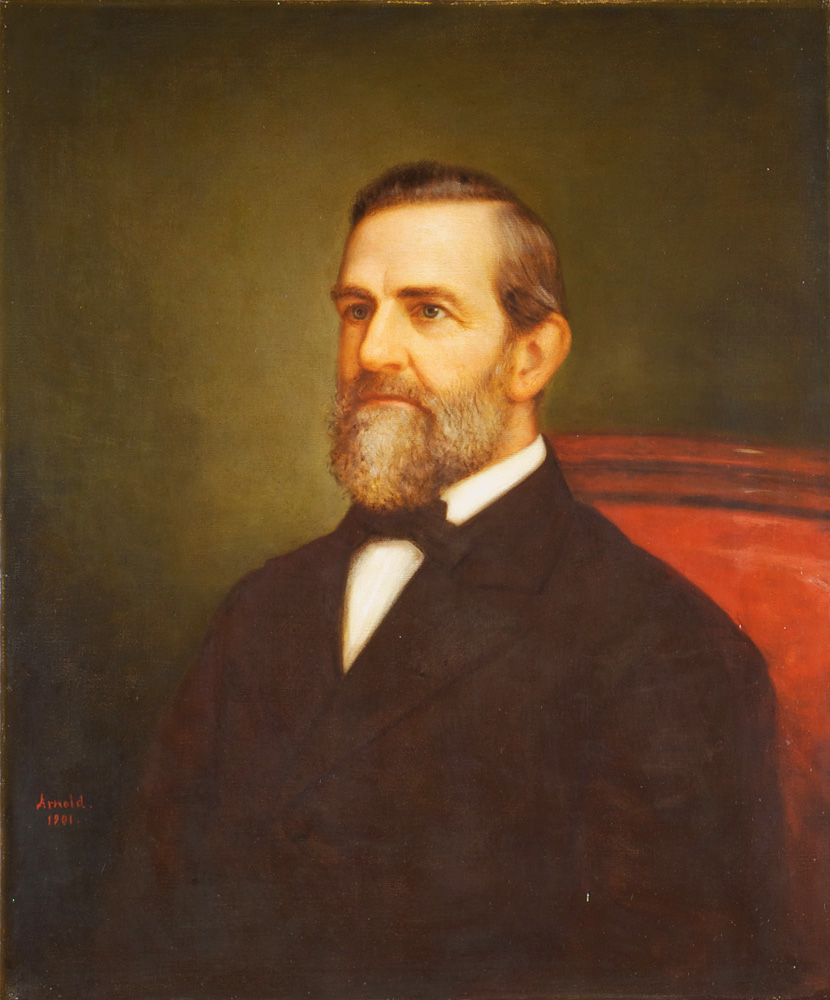
- Born: May 4, 1822; Westwood
- Died: May 13, 1899
- Education: Brown University
- Occupation: Librarian
- Employer: Brown University
- Awards: American Library Association Honorary Membership (1895)

Reuben Aldridge Guild (May 4, 1822 – 1899) was the librarian of Brown University from 1848 to 1893. He was born in Dedham, Massachusetts.

He was a member of the Baldwin Place Baptist Church in Boston. He later went on to study the History of the Baptist church in North America. He was particularly interested in Roger Williams who is credited with founding the first Baptist church on American soil.

On his graduation from Brown in 1847, he became assistant librarian, and in March 1848 succeeded his former teacher, Charles Coffin Jewett, as librarian. He was the historian of Brown University, keeping scrapbooks of clippings about the university beginning in 1851. Guild was elected a member of the American Antiquarian Society in 1876. He was awarded American Library Association Honorary Membership in 1895.

He died in Providence on May 13, 1899, at the age of 77.

== Works include ==
- The Life, Times and Correspondence of James Manning.
- Early History of Brown University in 1864.
- History of Brown University with Illustrative Documents in 1867.
- The Early History of Brown University in 1897.

== Sources ==
- Encyclopedia Brunoniana
