= Lucille Cole Thomas =

American librarian (1921–2019)

- Born: October 1, 1921
- Died: June 15, 2019 (aged 97)
- Education: Bennett College; New York University; Columbia University
- Occupation: Librarian

Lucille Cole Thomas (October 1, 1921 – June 15, 2019) was an American librarian. Thomas had a long career supporting library services for children with the New York City Board of Education. She was the first African American president of the New York Library Association. She also served as president of the International Association of School Librarianship and the American Association of School Librarians.

== Personal life and education ==
Lucile Cole Thomas was born October 1, 1921.

She received a Bachelor of Arts degree from Bennett College in 1941. While she worked as a librarian at Brooklyn Public Library, she earned a Masters of Arts degree in English from New York University and a Masters in Library Science from Columbia University. Thomas was awarded an honorary doctorate from Bennett College.

== Career ==
Thomas began her career as a school teacher in Madison, Georgia where she met and married her husband and subsequently moved to Macon, Georgia. She moved to Brooklyn with her husband in 1955 and started work as a librarian at Brooklyn Public Library.

In 1956 Thomas started a long career with the New York City New York City Board of Education. From 1956 to 1968 she was a librarian for the Board of Education; she worked as supervisor of library services from 1968 to 1977. From 1977 to 1983 she worked in the role of assistant director of the office of library, media, and telecommunications.

New York City mayor David Dinkins appointed Thomas to the Brooklyn Public Library's Board of Trustees in 1993. She served as president of the board from 2003 to 2006.

She was also an adjunct professor for the library school of Queens College, City University of New York.

== Leadership and advocacy ==
Thomas was the president of the New York City School Librarians Association from 1970 to 1972, the first African American to serve in that role. She was also the first African American president of the New York Library Association when she was elected to that role in 1978. She founded School Library Media Day in 1974 through the New York Library Association, which is celebrated as School Library Month and School Library Day. She established and directed the New York City public schools' Citywide Storytelling Festival, first held in 1978.

From 1989 to 1995 Thomas was the president of the International Association of School Librarianship. She also served as the president of the New York Library Club. She held multiple leadership roles in the American Library Association, including twenty-two years of service on ALA Council and six years as a member of the Executive Board from 1985 to 1991.

In 2002 Thomas testified before the Committee on Education and the Workforce in favor of reauthorizing the Museum and Library Service Act, providing funding to the Institute of Museum and Library Services.

== Awards and honors ==
Jesse Owens Elementary School (P.S. 026) in Brooklyn dedicated the Lucile C. Thomas Library in 1980.

In 1995 Thomas was the fifth recipient of the Black Caucus of the American Library Association's highest honor, the Trailblazers Award, given to recipients whose "pioneering contributions have been outstanding and unique".

In 2003 she received American Library Association Honorary Membership, the Association's highest honor, in recognition of her "notable contributions to the profession as a librarian, educator and library trustee, her leadership role at the local, state, national and international levels, and her unstinting contributions to the education of children and young adults."

The Dr. Lucille C. Thomas Award for Excellence in Librarianship was established in 2017 by the Brooklyn Public Library.

=== Additional awards and honors ===
- Distinguished Alumni Award, Columbia University (1986)
- Grolier Foundation Award (1988)
- Distinguished Service Award, American Association of School Librarians (1994)
- John Ames Humphrey Award, OCLC/Forest Press (1995)
- Silver Award from the U.S. National Commission on Libraries and Information Science (1996)
- Role of Honor, Freedom to Read Foundation (2007)
