= Patricia G. Schuman =

American librarian

Patricia Glass Schuman
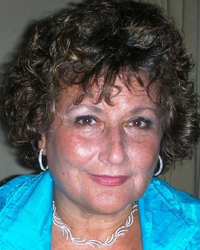
- Schuman in 2013

President of the American Library Association
- In office 1991–1992
- Preceded by: Richard M. Dougherty
- Succeeded by: Marilyn L. Miller

Personal details
- Born: 15 March 1943 (age 83)
- Occupation: Librarian

Patricia Glass Schuman (born 1943) is an American librarian and publisher who served as president of the American Library Association from 1991 to 1992. She is known for her advocacy for the public’s “Right to Know,” highlighting library funding cuts, censorship, and restricted access to government information.

== Career ==
Schuman is a graduate of the University of Cincinnati and the Columbia University School of Library Service.

Schuman worked at the Brooklyn Public Library, Brandeis High School and New York Technical College and served as senior acquisitions editor for the Book Division and editor of the Library/Education Book Program at R.R. Bowker Company and associate editor at School Library Journal. '

In 1976, Schuman founded Neal-Schuman Publishers with John Vincent Neal. The company specialized in education resources for librarians, educators and information professionals. The company became part of ALA Publishing in 2011.

She served the American Library Association as its first woman treasurer (1984–1988) and led efforts to endow a scholarship fund. Schuman was a founding member of the ALA's Social Responsibilities Roundtable and the Feminist Task Force.

Schuman was visiting lecturer at many programs of library and information science including Syracuse University School of Information Studies, Pratt Institute School of Library and Information Studies, Long Island University School of Library and Information Studies, Ecoles des Sciences de líInformation, Morocco, Columbia University School of Library Service, Rutgers University School of Library and Information Studies, and St. John's University School of Library Service.

== Presidency of the American Library Association ==
As President of the American Library Association, Schuman launched a nationwide campaign to focus attention on the public's right to know including censorship and access to government information. She implemented media training for association leaders, established a speaker's network, and founded the Library Advocacy Now! effort.

Gloria Steinem, invited by ALA President, Patricia Glass Schuman, at American Library Association, General Session 1992.

"ALA President's Column." American Libraries:

- July/August, 1991 – "Passivity is not a Virtue"
- September, 1991 – "The Right to Know: You Can Make It Happen!"
- October, 1991 – "Power to the People – In Washington and Moscow"
- November, 1991 – "Strategies for Surmounting Navel-Gazing"
- December, 1991 – "Fighting for the Right to Know"
- January, 1992 – "Inequalities Will Not Build the American Dream"
- February, 1992 – "Cynicism, Euphemisms, and Seductive Hyperbole About Privatization"
- March, 1992 – "The Same Old Song"
- April, 1992 – "The Right to Know: Haves and Have-nots"
- May, 1992 – "Librarians and Support Staff: We All Make It Happen"
- June, 1992 – "The Adventure of Being ALA President"

In a 2024 interview published in the journal, Florida Libraries, Schuman reflected on the importance of advocacy to maintain support for libraries.

In 2026 Schuman wrote for the Library Journal “Faith in Our Future”| LJ150 series." Her essay, "Library Advocacy NOW!," is an assessment of the need for library associations to "refocus our efforts in ways that will ensure libraries can continue to thrive for the next 150 years."

== Awards ==
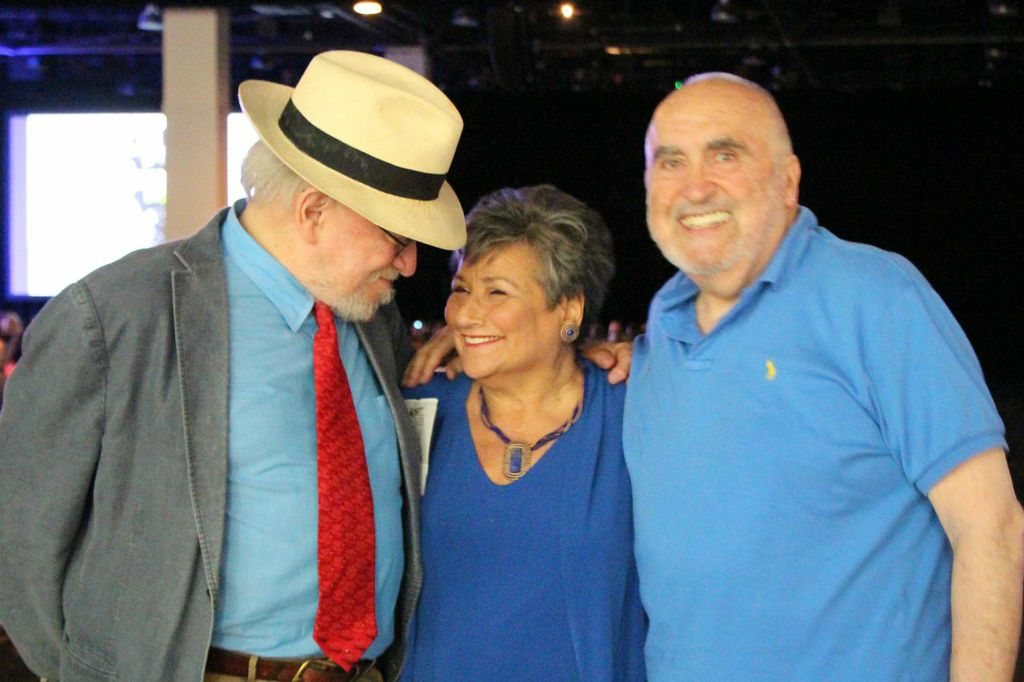
Pat Schuman with Mitch Freedman and John N. Berry after receiving ALA Honorary Membership in 2014.

- 2014. American Library Association Honorary Membership.
- 2007. Eileen Cooke Award.
- 2001.Joseph W. Lippincott Award in 2001.
- 1993 American Library Association Equality Award.
- 1983 Fannie Simon Award of the Special Libraries Association.

== Selected publications ==
- "Library Advocacy NOW!: Faith in Our Future". Library Journal. Media Source Inc. September 1, 2026. ISSN 0363-0277.
- "Your Right to Know: The Call to Action" (American Library Association, 1992) ISBN 0838934285
- "Women, Power and Libraries." Library Journal (January, 1984) translated into Japanese and published in Toshokan-Kai/The Library World (November, 1984)
- "Library and information services for meeting personal needs: a discussion guide" (National Commission on Libraries and Information Science, 1979)
- Schuman, Patricia Glass, and Kathleen Weibel. "The Women Arisen." American Libraries 10, no. 6 (1979): 322–26.
- Schuman, Patricia. 1976. Social Responsibilities and Libraries : A Library Journal/School Library Journal Selection. New York: R.R. Bowker Co.
- "Materials for occupational education: An annotated source guide" (R. R. Bowker, 1971) ISBN 0835204065

Non-profit organization positions
Preceded by Richard M. Dougherty	President of the American Library Association; 1991–1992	Succeeded by Marilyn L. Miller
