= Arthur Curley =

American librarian (1938–1998)

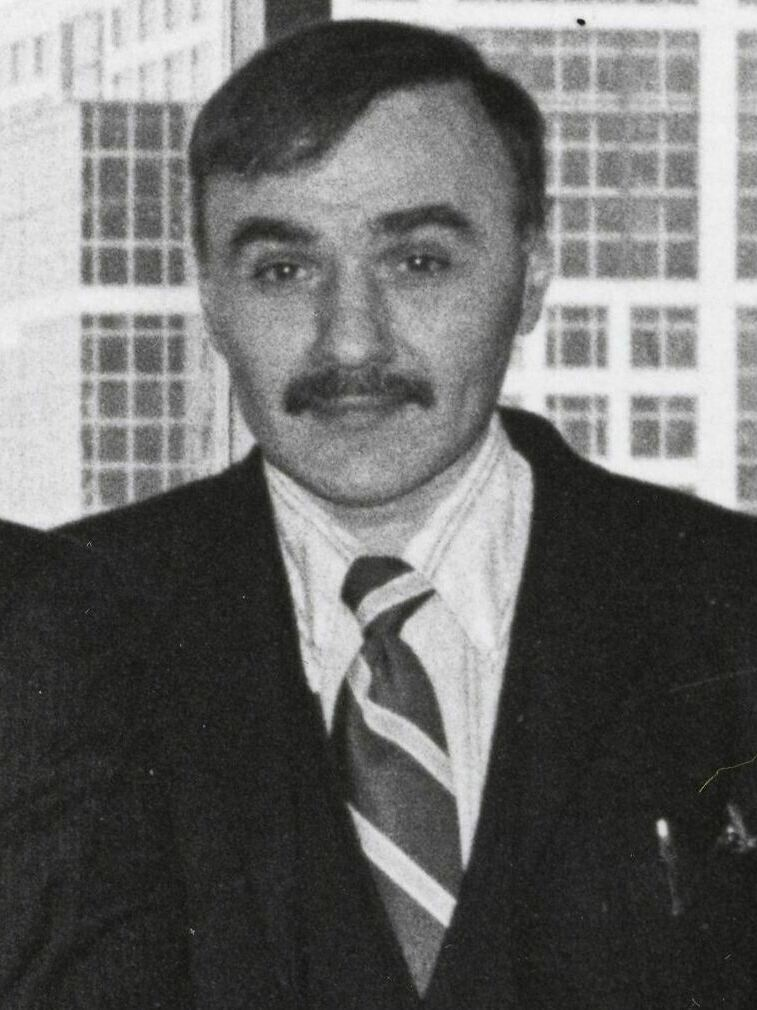

President of the American Library Association
- In office 1994–1995
- Preceded by: Hardy R. Franklin
- Succeeded by: Betty J. Turock

Personal details
- Born: January 22, 1938 Boston, Massachusetts, US
- Died: March 31, 1998 (aged 60) Boston, Massachusetts, US
- Education: Harvard University; Simmons College
- Occupation: Librarian

Arthur Curley (January 22, 1938 – March 31, 1998) was an American librarian who was listed as one of the 100 most important library leaders of the 20th century by journal American Libraries.

== Early life and education ==
Arthur Curley was born in Boston on January 22, 1938, to Irish parents. His mother is credited with having high expectations for him, and for correctly presuming that he would attend the prestigious Boston Latin secondary school. Later, he studied political science at Harvard University, graduating in 1959 before earning his Master of Library Science degree at Simmons College in 1962.

== Career ==
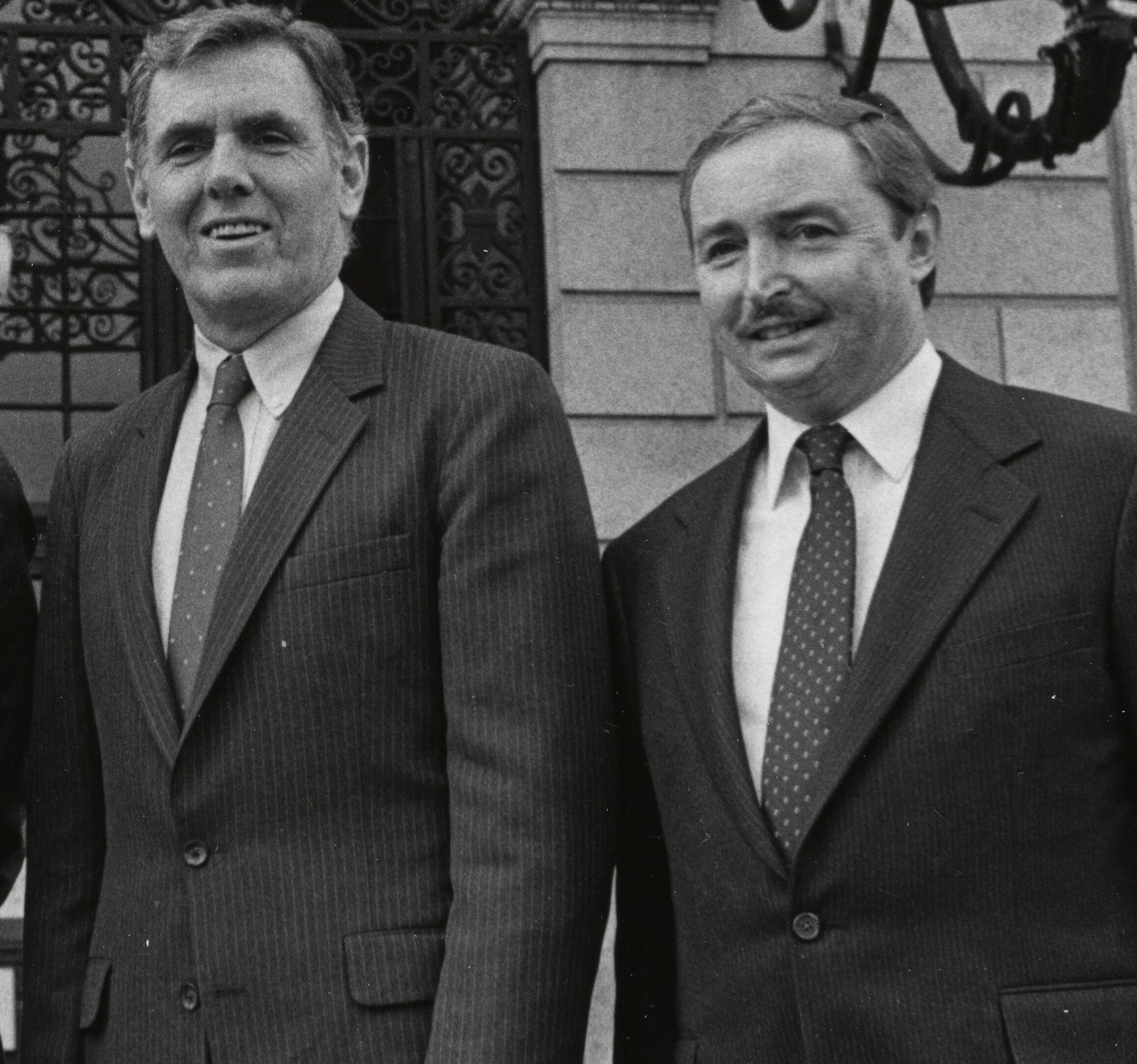
Curley (right) with Boston Mayor Raymond Flynn circa 1984–1987

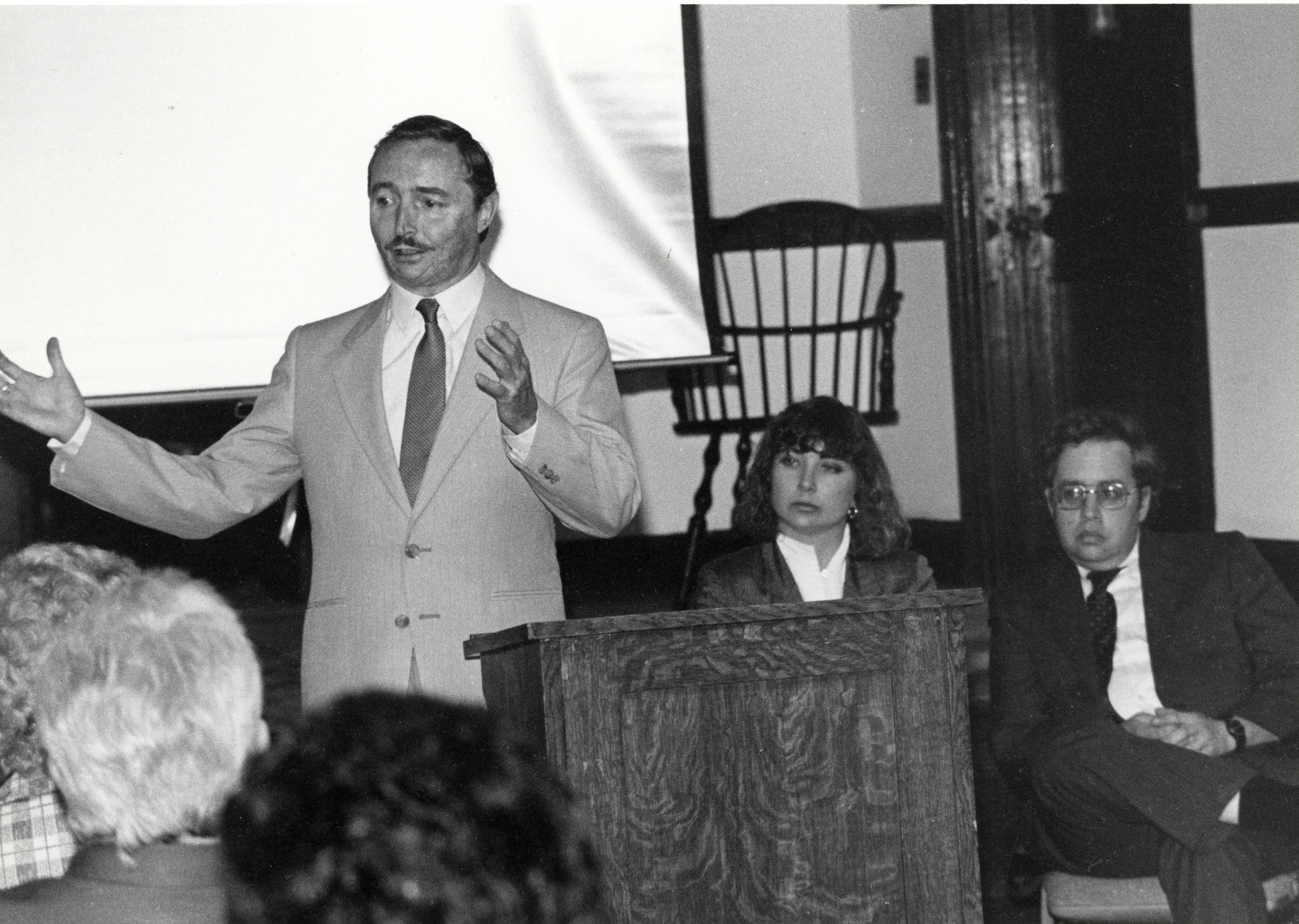
Curley (left) speaking circa 1984–1987

Curley's first position in a library was at the Connolly branch of the Boston Public Library system in a so-called "pre-professional position". By the time he had completed his library degree, he had already been appointed as director of the Avon Public library. He worked from 1961 to 1964. Though this was a directorship in title, he was the only employee, and responsible for virtually every component of the library.

In 1964, Curley was appointed as the director of the Palatine Public Library in Illinois, where he served until 1969.

Throughout his career he remained primarily in the Atlantic North East and Mid-West regions, typically taking positions as deputy director or director. Notably he "served as deputy director of the New York Public Library Research Libraries in 1980-1985 and deputy director of public services at Detroit Public Library from 1997 to 1980".

He was the director of the Boston Public Library from 1985 until 1996.

== American Library Association ==
Arthur Curley was President of the American Library Association in 1994-1995. He was a member of the ALA Council, the association's governing body, (1970-74, 1981-87) and Executive Board (1983-87). He was chair of the Intellectual Freedom Committee from 1991 to 1994.

Notable public writing during his presidency include:

- Curley, A. (1994). "Libraries: an American value". American Libraries. 25: 691.
- Curley, A. (1995). "Why Americans can't wait". American Libraries. 26: 204.
- Curley, A. (1995). "Support ALA goal 2000". American Libraries. 26: 284.
- Curley, A. (1995). "Celebrating libraries". American Libraries. 26: 380.
- Curley, A. (1995). "ALA president's message". American Libraries. 26: 510.

After his death in 1998 the American Library Association established the Arthur Curley Memorial Lecture held at ALA Midwinter Conferences. The lectures were intended to explore the intersection of libraries with intellectual, cultural, and political spheres.

== Views ==
Curley was known to be politically astute, and was tremendously concerned with how the function of the library as an institution was viewed by the public. Although he understood the important role of providing information, he was emphatic that libraries needed to be seen first and foremost as "humanistic institutions". He saw libraries as embodying the best of America's hopes and as the physical "repository of their values and aspirations" for each and every community. As such, he believed that a strong commitment to collection building based on community needs was essential at every library and he was fiercely critical of "libraries [that] lowered their collection building sights in the name of resource-sharing or 'access over ownership'".

His belief in the power of libraries as valuable community institutions was enormous. During a speech he remarked,

I have always felt that I could go into any town, community, hamlet anywhere in this country, and if you blindfolded me so I didn’t know what community I was in, took me into the public library and suddenly took the blindfold off and let me look around for about ten minutes I think I could tell you more about the values of that community than I could derive from countless hours spent poring over census tracts and other sources of statistical information about it. Why? Because a library is a representative of intangible values and those intangible values more than ever are important to us as a society at this time..

Despite his love of the cultural aspects a library can provide, Curley was in no way technophobic. He encouraged librarians to see their work and especially their role as a key part of the information revolution. Imploring his peers in 1994 at a symposium at Rutgers School of Communication, Information, and Library Studies he said, "We need to be people for whom this is one more technological development, like the telephone or the electric typewriter, which we view with optimism because it will help us to do our jobs". However, he was particularly concerned with how this new technology and new forms of media could further divide populations based on class and other social factors depending on the relative levels of access. It was his belief that technological improvements should "arise from public commitment rather than fortuitous private philanthropy".

== Legacy ==
In addition to being widely regarded as one of the most eloquent library advocates, Curley's energy and achievement for committee work within library organizations were enormous. When he became president of ALA in 1994 he ran on the theme "Libraries: An American Value" platform. Presently, he may be best known for the lecture series bearing his name, the Arthur Curley Memorial Lecture, which is devoted to the same theme and takes place each mid-winter meeting.

He was a founding member of ALA’s Social Responsibility Round Table which exists to make the ALA more democratic and to equip librarians to help address social inequality and other human rights issues. He was also chair of the Intellectual Freedom Committee from 1991 to 1994.

During his presidency he founded Library Advocacy Now, which has facilitated important training for library advocates. Rather than merely promoting best practices "for Curley, LAN represented the first step of a grassroots effort of the ALA's 'awaking to activism'". The rhetorical force of his visions for the role libraries can have in society continues to be important for many librarians and library advocates.

== Notes ==
Non-profit organization positions
Preceded by Hardy R. Franklin	President of the American Library Association; 1994–1995	Succeeded by Betty J. Turock
