= Neal-Schuman Publishers =

Imprint of the American Library Association

Neal-Schuman Publishers, Inc. is an imprint of the American Library Association. Its headquarters are in Chicago. The imprint publishes professional books intended for archivists, knowledge managers, and librarians.

== History ==
Patricia Glass Schuman and John Vincent Neal founded the publisher in 1976. Originally the company packaged library reference books and professional books published by other companies. Beginning in 1979, Neal-Schuman began marketing and publishing its own books.

In 2011 Neal-Schuman had a headquarters in New York City and an office in London. It had over 500 in-print backlist titles. It also marketed and/or copublished around 200 books and monographs. During that year ALA Publishing acquired Neal-Schuman, with the takeover effective on December 23, 2011. In the following three months, ALA planned to move Neal-Schuman operations from New York City to Chicago.
