= Marilyn L. Miller =

American librarian and educator (1930–2014)

President of the American Library Association
- In office 1992–1993
- Preceded by: Patricia G. Schuman
- Succeeded by: Hardy R. Franklin

Personal details
- Born: Marilyn Lea Miller; October 9, 1930 St. Joseph, Missouri, US
- Died: May 22, 2014 (aged 83) Greensboro, North Carolina, US
- Education: University of Kansas; University of Michigan
- Occupation: Librarian

Marilyn Lea Miller (October 9, 1930 – May 22, 2014) was an American librarian and educator and president of the American Library Association from 1992 to 1993. She was also President of the Association for Library Service to Children (1979–80), and the American Association of School Librarians (1986–87).

== Early life and education ==
Miller was born in St. Joseph, Missouri to James Irving Miller and Merna Liggett Miller. She received her bachelor's degree in education from the University of Kansas in 1952 and went on to receive her master's and doctorate degrees in 1959 and 1976 respectively from the University of Michigan.

== Career ==
She was a school librarian in Kansas from 1952 to 1961 when she became the first school library consultant for the Kansas State Department of Public Instruction. She was President of the Kansas Library Association and the Kansas Association of School Librarians.

She taught at the School of Librarianship, Western Michigan University from 1966-1977 and was president of the Michigan Association for Media in Education.

In 1977, she joined the School of Library Science at the University of North Carolina at Chapel Hill as an associate professor.

She became chair of the Department of Library Science and Information Studies at the University of North Carolina at Greensboro (UNCG) in 1987. She edited a series of School Library Journal reports summarizing specific developments in public and private school library media programs in the United States. She retired from that position in 1995. While at UNCG, Miller established a distance education program for the program.

She wrote Pioneers and Leaders in Library Services to Youth a Biographical Dictionary.

She served on Greensboro Public Library Board and Friends of the Library, and on the North Carolina State Library Commission.

== Legacy ==
The North Carolina Library Association, Women's Issues in Librarianship Roundtable gives the "Marilyn Miller Award for Professional Commitment."

== Awards and honors ==
- Distinguished School Library Media Specialist Award, Kansas Association of School Librarians (1987)
- Distinguished Alumna Award, the School of Information and Library Studies, the University of Michigan (1988)
- Award for Professional Contributions to Library and Information Science Education, Association for Library and Information Science Education (1999)
- Distinguished Service Award, Association for Library Services to Children (2005)

Non-profit organization positions
Preceded by Patricia G. Schuman	President of the American Library Association; 1992–1993	Succeeded by Hardy R. Franklin
