= Hardy R. Franklin =

American librarian

President of the American Library Association
- In office 1993–1994
- Preceded by: Marilyn L. Miller
- Succeeded by: Arthur Curley

Personal details
- Born: May 9, 1929; Rome, Georgia, US
- Died: August 22, 2004 (aged 75); Washington, D.C., US
- Education: Morehouse College; Atlanta University; Rutgers University
- Occupation: Librarian

Hardy Rogers Franklin (May 9, 1929 – August 22, 2004) was an American librarian and served as president of the American Library Association from 1993 to 1994.

Franklin received a bachelor's degree from Morehouse College and began a career as a teacher and librarian in Conyers, Georgia. He served as a librarian in the U.S. Army from 1953 to 1955 in Okinawa, Japan. He received a master's degree in library science from Atlanta University in 1956 and moved to New York to work at the Brooklyn Public Library.

In 1971, after graduating from Rutgers University with a doctorate in library science, he taught at Queens College.

Franklin moved to Washington, D.C. in 1974 to lead the District of Columbia Public Library. In DC, he led an effort to dedicate a mural to the Reverend Martin Luther King Jr. and extended the library's online catalog to high schools and the University of the District of Columbia. Franklin established community libraries, an arts library and a weekly "dial-a-story" program.

== Publications ==
- "Customer service : the heart of a library : inaugural address, June 30, 1993, New Orleans" (American Library Association, 1993)
- "Keeping Libraries Open" Paper presented at the American Library Association Annual Conference (95th, Chicago, Illinois, July 18–24, 1976) ERIC 127 996
- "Where Are We Going?" Paper presented at the American Library Association Annual Conference (95th, Chicago, Illinois, July 18–24, 1976) ERIC 127 997
- "The relationship between adult communication practices and public library use in a northern, urban, black ghetto" (1971)

Non-profit organization positions
Preceded by Marilyn L. Miller	President of the American Library Association; 1993–1994	Succeeded by Arthur Curley
