= Library War Council =

Poster from 1917 encouraging people to donate.

The United States Library War Council was founded in 1917 by the American Library Association as part of the Library War Service. Its aim was to raise funds as well as solicit books donations so that American troops overseas during WWI could avail themselves of library services while serving the country. The council's headquarters existed in the Library of Congress starting in October 1917.

== Background ==
On June 22, 1917, the American Library Association voted to create the War Service Committee and sub-committees. In August of the same year, a vote was held to green-light a fundraising campaign. The project's first campaign for funds ran from August 23, 1917, through November 1, 1917. During this time, Matthew S. Dudgeon was appointed Camp Libraries Director.

One of the council's projects involved collecting books to send to American troops overseas during WWI. Another object was to provide overall library services to the troops. In total, the council held three campaigns to provide servicepersons with books and other amenities commonly found in libraries. Posters solicited the public for funds as well as book donations. Some campaigns solicited for money alone, while others were in solicitation of books. Various articles appeared in newspapers and magazines drawing attention to the cause and enlisting the public's interest in the education of soldiers. For example, Eveline W. Brainerd's "Reading At the Front," published January 19, 1918 in The Independent, read:

"Scant as the libraries at the front have been and still are, little as they hold of recent publications, they are yet circulating thousands of books and do fine service all of the daytime."

== Chairmen ==
The movement was headed by various chairmen such as Frank A. Vanderlip (1919), a banker, journalist, and former Assistant Secretary of the Treasury, and Everett Perry (1917), Head Librarian of the Los Angeles Central Library, in charge of the Southwestern Division.
