= Henrietta M. Smith =

American academic (1922–2021)

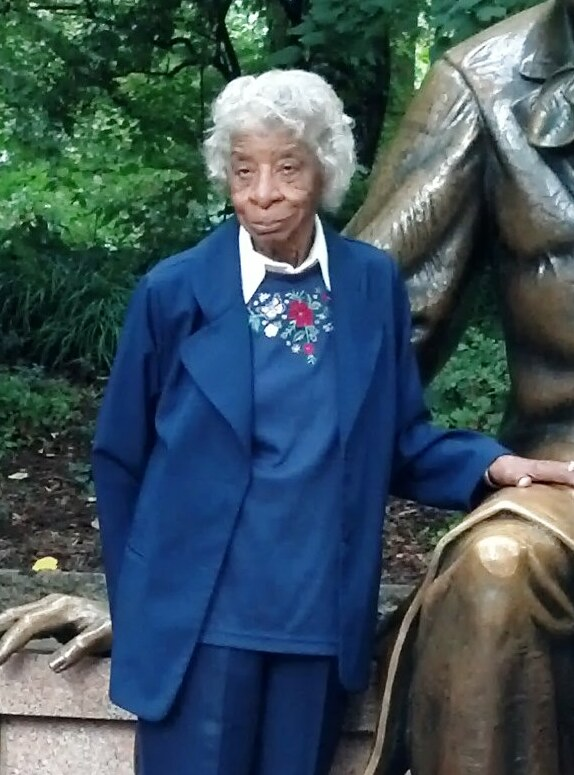
- Smith in 2014
- Born: Henrietta Mays; May 2, 1922; New York City, U.S.
- Died: April 21, 2021 (aged 98); Delray Beach, Florida, U.S.
- Education: Hunter College, B.A, 1943; Columbia University, B.S. and M.S. in Library Science; University of Miami, Ed.D., curriculum and supervision
- Occupations: Professor, historian and scholar of African American children's literature, librarian, storyteller
- Employer(s): New York Public Library, Florida Atlantic University, Broward County, University of South Florida
- Spouse: Isiah C. Smith
- Children: 2

Henrietta M. Smith (May 2, 1922 – April 21, 2021) was an American academic, librarian, and storyteller, who edited four editions of the Coretta Scott King Award collection published by the American Library Association. In 2008, she was honored with the Association for Library Service to Children (ALSC) Distinguished Service Award, which recognizes significant contributions to library service to children and ALSC. She is also the recipient of the 2011 Coretta Scott King-Virginia Hamilton Award for Lifetime Achievement for her body of work as a significant and lasting literary contribution. She was honored during the 2014 Carle Honors Celebration by the Eric Carle Museum of Picture Book Art for her life's work as a champion of diversity in children's literature.

== Education ==
Henrietta Mays Smith was born on May 2, 1922, in Harlem, New York City. She is the daughter of Nettie Johnson and Henry Lucas Mays. Smith originally wanted to be a Latin instructor, but eventually studied English and history at Hunter College, and received her B.A. in 1943. Then she attended Columbia University, and earned her B.S. and M.S. in Library Science in 1946 and 1959. In 1975, she completed her doctorate degree in curriculum and supervision at the University of Miami in Coral Gables, Florida.

== Library career and contributions ==
After graduating, Smith wanted to come to the South "to see if what they said was true." She applied at libraries in Historically black colleges and universities and accepted the highest paying offer, that of cataloger at Florida A&M University in Tallahassee, a position she held for two years. She married Isiah C. Smith who would become a civil rights attorney. They returned to New York where Smith worked at the Countee Cullen branch of the New York Public Library as a children's librarian and storyteller under the mentorship of librarian Augusta Braxton Baker, telling stories at locations such as the Hans Christian Andersen Statue in Central Park. The couple later moved to live and work in Delray Beach, Florida.

In Florida Smith worked as a school librarian and consultant for Broward County, where she built the children's book collection for the Pompano Beach Branch Library. After earning the doctorate she taught at Florida Atlantic University as an instructor in the College of Education. In 1985 she was recruited to teach at the University of South Florida, School of Information. She was the first Black professor at the School. Upon retirement she was honored as Emeritus Professor. Classes Smith taught included History of Children's Literature and Multicultural Materials for Children and Young Adults. Smith wrote "Poetry of the African Diaspora: In Search of Common Ground Between Anglo and Latin America" and in 2000 wrote the introduction to Lift Every Voice and Sing: A Pictorial Tribute to the Negro National Anthem. She was part of the Alice G. Smith Lecture Committee at the University of South Florida, School of Information that celebrated the Lecture's founder and brought Ashley Bryan as 10th lecturer.

Smith edited four volumes about the history of the Coretta Scott King Award and was chair of the Coretta Scott King Task Force. Proceeds from Smith's book. "Coretta Scott King Awards Books: From Vision to Reality." were donated to the Coretta Scott King Book Award. She worked with the Broward County Library to establish the Ashley Bryan Art Series at the Broward County's African-American Research Library and Cultural Center (AARLCC) in Fort Lauderdale.

Smith was an active American Library Association member in many divisions for more than 40 years. She was on the ALSC (Association for Library Service to Children) Legislation Committee and Oral History Committee, the Young Adult Library Services Association Quick Picks Committee and the AASL (American Association of School Librarians) Cultural Diversity Task Force. She was a board member of the Florida Association of Media in Education (FAME ) and the Florida Library Association.

Smith was also involved with Storytelling International, which teaches and develops multicultural storytelling and the oral tradition. She told stories with Esther Martinez, also known as P'oe Tswa (Blue Water), in New Mexico and contributed to Martinez' 2004 book, My Life in San Juan Pueblo: Stories of Esther Martinez.

In 2006, at age 84, Smith traveled with a medical team down the Amazon River telling stories to children in the small villages of Enseada, Itapiranga and Nova Esperança.

In 2014 REFORMA, The National Association to Promote Library & Information Services to Latinos and the Spanish Speaking and ALSC honored Smith at the 20th anniversary of the Pura Belpré Award. In a tribute to Smith, the REFORMA de Florida Task Force noted, "Dr. Smith was a member of REFORMA and REFORMA de Florida, and a supporter since we first tried to reorganize the chapter in 2011. Dr. Smith was a champion for diversity and representation in children's literature, long before #OwnVoices was a hashtag or “We Need Diverse Books” was trending."

In 2025 she was included in The Legacy of Black Women in Librarianship : When They Dared to Be Powerful with a chapter titled, "A Fulfilling Legacy of Florida Firsts: The Pioneering Impact of Henrietta Mays Smith.

== Awards received and professional memberships ==
In 2008, Smith was honored with the ALSC (Association for Library Service to Children) Distinguished Service Award. She was honored with the Employment Service Human Resource Champions Award and the 2011 Coretta Scott King-Virginia Hamilton Practitioner Award for Lifetime Achievement. In 2014, she received the Carle Honors Mentor award from The Eric Carle Museum of Picture Book Art for her life's work as a champion of diversity in children's literature. The citation reads: "Dr. Henrietta Mays Smith is widely recognized for her contributions as an influential children's librarian, scholar, and author and as a strong advocate for quality and diversity in children's literature." She was the first librarian to receive this honor.

Smith served on numerous committees, including the book selection committees for the Pura Belpré, Newbery, and Caldecott awards. She was a storytelling consultant in Albuquerque, New Mexico.

== Delta Sigma Theta ==
Smith was a founding member and first president of the South Palm Beach County Alumnae Chapter of Delta Sigma Theta in 1984. She was honored as a "Woman of Excellence" in 2011.
