= Clearwater Public Library System =

Public library system in Florida

Coordinates: 27.9675°N 82.8011°W

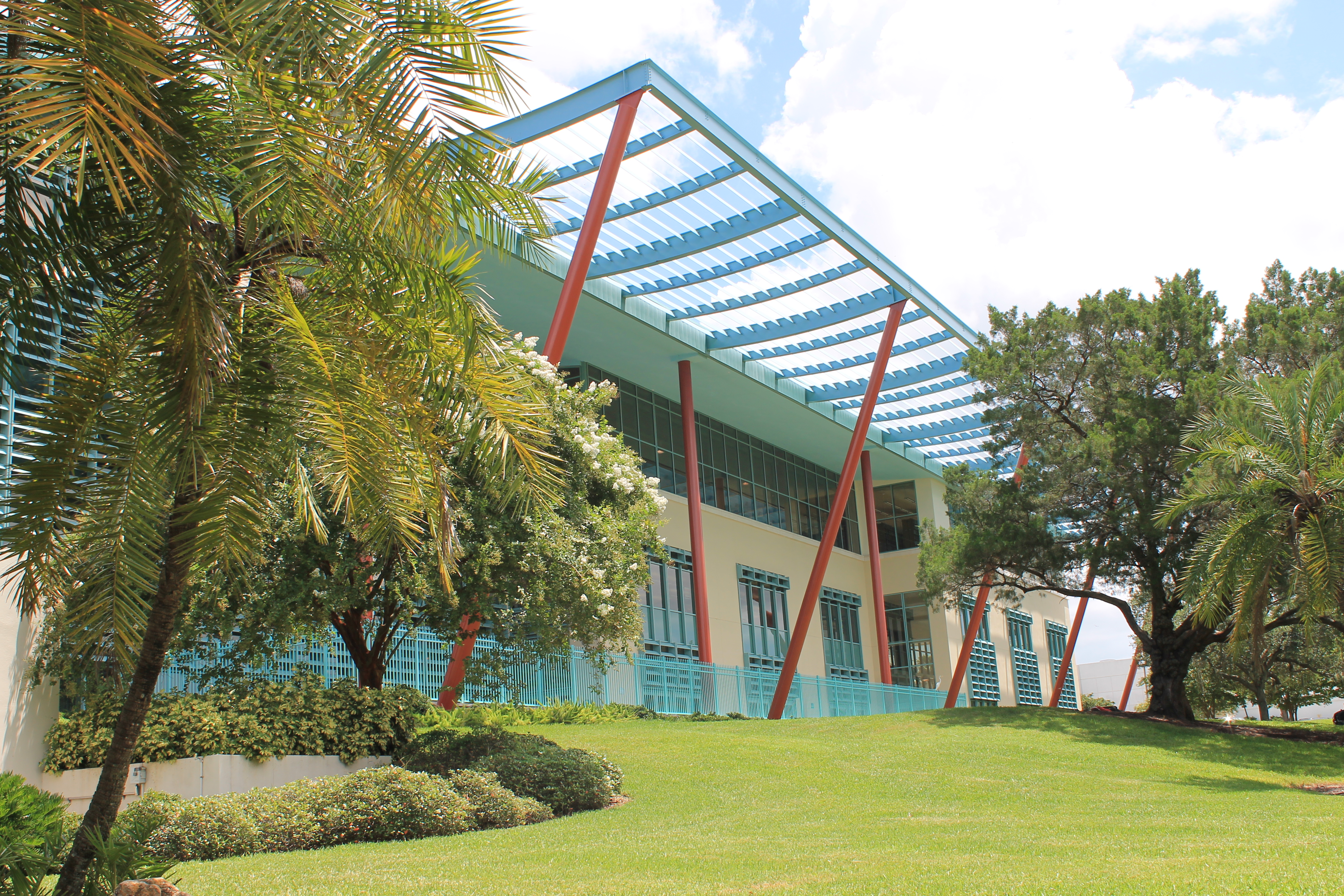
- Main Branch, Osceola Avenue
- Location: Clearwater, Florida, United States of America
- Type: Public library
- Branches: 5

Access and use
- Population served: 134,000

Other information
- Budget: 6.07 Million
- Website: www.myclearwater.com/cpl/

The Clearwater Public Library System (CPLS) is a public library system with five branches that provides service to the citizens of Clearwater, Florida and Pinellas County. The library system was founded in 1911. It is a member of the Pinellas Public Library Cooperative.

== History ==
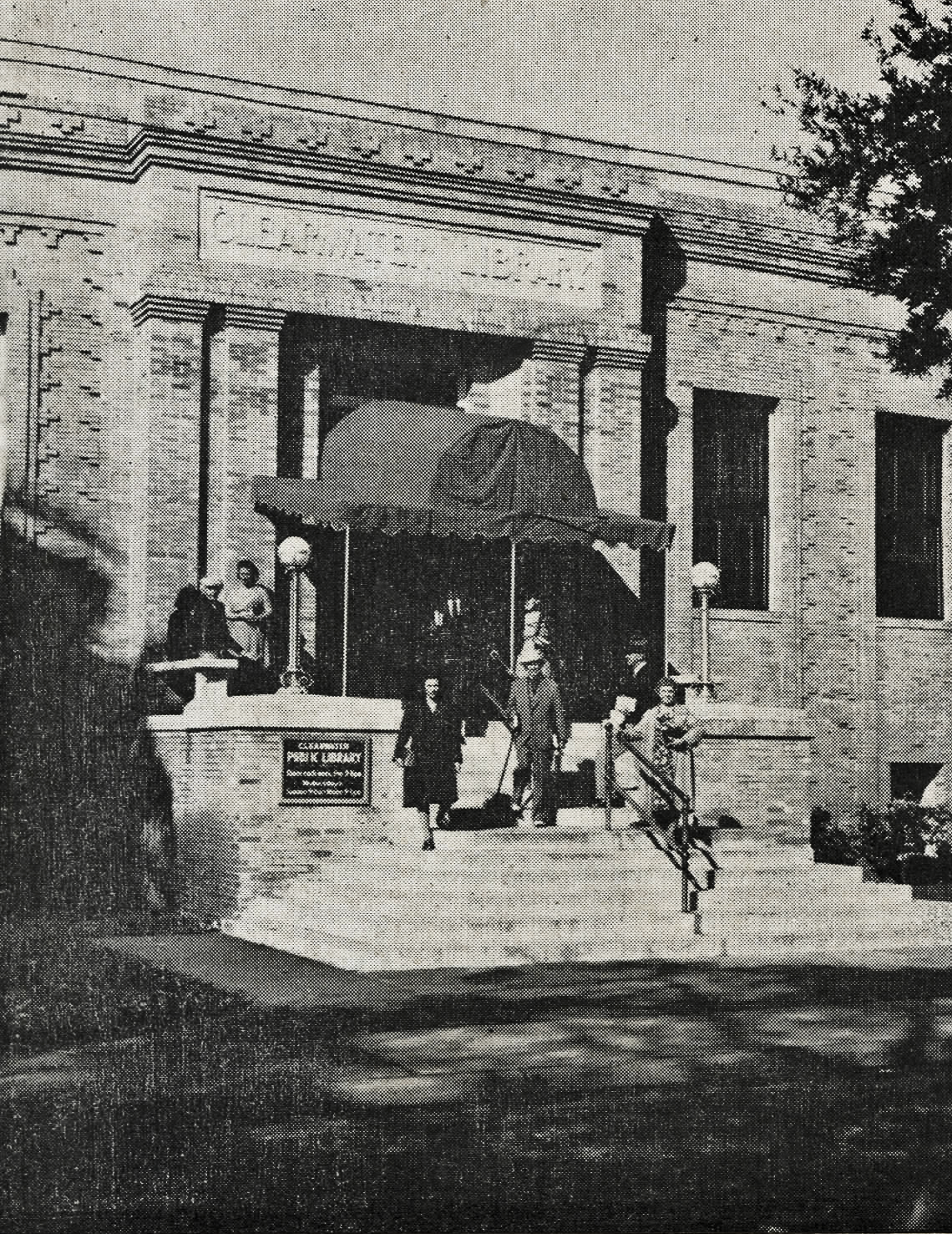
The Clearwater Public Library, 1946.

Prior to the opening of the free public library system in 1916, there was the Clearwater Library Association (which was a subscription library) which was founded in 1911. Over the next few years, talks began for the planning of a free public library. Carnegie granted $10,000 for the construction of the first public library. A special tax was used to purchase the site and to fund the maintenance of the building, which would be located on Osceola and Sunset. The building was designed by architect F.J. Kennard of Tampa, and G.A. Miller was awarded the contract for construction. Margaret Duncan was the first librarian (and then Library Director) appointed to the Clearwater Public Library. When Duncan left in 1918, the position was filled in 1920 by Grace Mease. By 1920, over half of the city's population were library cardholders. A few more staff were hired to support daily library duties and maintenance. The Depression years hit the library negatively as it did elsewhere; the resulting budget cuts were both necessary and devastating. When a $40 ceiling repair request was denied by the City Manager, the librarian purchased the supplies and paid someone to repair it for less than $14. The librarian was reimbursed by the City Manager for the expense. Another extreme budget cut led to Mease's dismissal, and assistant Annie Owens was promoted to Library Director, without the pay increase.

Talks within the Library Board to establish a branch for African-American residents dated back to 1917, but did not come to fruition until 1950. The North Greenwood location was opened at Pennsylvania and Cedar Street on March 15, 1950, and was headed by librarian Christine Wigfall Morris. With growth at North Greenwood came the need for a larger site, and a new building was erected in 1962 on Palmetto Street. The Beach Branch was established in July 1961 at 40 Causeway Boulevard, and was then moved to the Pelican Walk Shopping Center in 1999. In 2008, in partnership with the City of Clearwater Parks and Recreation Department, the Beach Branch became a part of the Clearwater Beach Recreation Complex.

The Main Library was expanded in 1939 after space became a major concern, as materials were overflowing the shelves to the floor and the catalog cards were in cardboard boxes. In 1942, again the building was assessed and many repairs and renovations were done. This same year, Sarah Byers was appointed to succeed Annie Owens as Library Director after Owens was struck and killed in March 1942 from an automobile accident. Byers was well qualified for the position due to her experience as an assistant since 1934. Due to the higher cost of living at the time, the City Manager increased Byers’ salary to $137.59 per month. Against recommendations from consultants to demolish the Carnegie building and start new for the Main library, more renovations and an extension by Joseph Lawrence Coggan were completed in 1961.

In 1971, Byers was replaced by Elliott Hardaway. His experience in libraries and management from the University of South Florida allowed him to bring up staffing to reach American Library Association standards after hiring professional librarians to fill Reference and Children’s Services positions. Nancy Zussy came on board as Library Director in 1978, and funding was provided to again renovate and improve the Main Library. Belleair philanthropists Henry and Elizabeth Adler donated $500,000, the City of Clearwater provided $800,000, and there was a $200,000 LSCA grant.

After resigning as Library Director to serve as Deputy Director of the Washington State Library, Zussy was replaced by Aleta Cozart who served as interim Director until 1981 when Linda Mielke was appointed. Mielke had extensive experience in marketing and management after coordinating twenty-three libraries in Maryland, and her experience later helped bring two more libraries into the Clearwater Public Library System. The East Branch broke ground in May 1984 after the City Commission approved a .25 millage increase to provide more buildings to Clearwater citizens, officially opening to the public in 1985 at Drew and Belcher Streets. A Management Team of Division Managers led the library system in 1991 after Linda Mielke accepted a position in Anne Arundel County, Maryland. This management team was supervised by then Deputy City Manager, Kathy Rice, and was made up of the following: Althea Andersen, Carolyn Moore, Marsha McGrath, and Linda Lange. Later on October 1, 1992, Dr. Arlita Hallam was hired as the new Library Director.

John Szabo became Library Director in 1998 with previous experience as director at the Robinson Public Library District and Palm Harbor Public Library. Szabo was later replaced by Barbara Pickell after leaving to become director of the Atlanta-Fulton Public Library System in 2005. In July 2000, voters approved the plan build a new Main Library, which was designed by Robert A.M. Stern, Dean of the Yale University School of Architecture. The grand opening was May 1, 2004. Barbara Pickell was hired as Library Director after working for the Fairfield County District Library System in Ohio. During her time as director, Pickell aided in the relocation of the Countryside branch and the introduction of a library Maker Space. After 11 years as director, Pickell retired and was replaced by Assistant Director Jennifer Obermaier. The Countryside Branch was moved to a new facility in 2015 and the East Branch was also relocated in 2018. The Countryside Branch is now located next to a recreation complex at 2642 Sabal Springs Dr. in Clearwater Florida. The East Branch has changed its name to the Clearwater East Community Library, and is located on the Clearwater St. Petersburg College campus. It is a joint-use facility open to both student and public patrons.

== Current Services ==
=== Holdings ===
The Clearwater Public Library System maintains a collection of books, e-books and e-audiobooks, music, DVDs, and video games. In addition to those items, access is expanded via services such as reserves within the wider Pinellas Public Library Cooperative and well as access to Libby, Hoopla, and Kanopy, services that allow patrons to check out ebooks, digital audiobooks and stream videos. The library system also subscribes to databases that provide patrons with 24-7 access to journals, articles, and abstracts under several categories.

In 2017, CPLS established the Thingamabrary collection, which consists of nonstandard items available for check out by the public. Thingamabrary holdings consists of items like ukuleles, tools, tech kits, board games, and bike locks.

In 2023, the Countryside branch started the Clearwater Seed Library, where patrons can check out seeds for gardening. This collection was expanded in January 2024 when the East branch began a seed library. Varieties at each branch include vegetables, fruits, flowers, and herbs offered on a seasonal rotation.

The Christine Wigfall Morris African American Collection is housed at the North Greenwood branch. The collection of African American literature and history consists of more than 4,300 items, including biographies, literature, magazines, music, and films.

In 1962, the Clearwater Power Squadron Boating Club donated 300 books to the library in honor of Carl Robert Wickman, a fellow squadron member and author. This initial donation created the Wickman Collection of Books of the Sea, which is housed at the Main library. Over the years, the library and Power Squadron continued adding to the collection and it currently consists of more than 2,000 books focused on marine topics.

The Clearwater Public Library System contains archives of historical local newspapers and photographs. The library also offers an archive of local historical yearbooks and city directories.

In addition to these services, the Clearwater Public Library System also offers Maker Studios. These are makerspaces where patrons can design, create, and explore using library equipment, software, and resources. The Clearwater Main Library and the Clearwater Countryside Library are the two homes of the Maker Studios. The Clearwater Main Library offers four different Maker Studios: the Creation Studio for Arts and Design, the Discovery Studio of Creative Learning, the Innovation Studio of Technology and Business, and the Heritage Studio of Community Memory. Each offers classes, drop-in sessions, and one-on-one training. The Countryside Library has the Maker Studio titled Studio@Countryside, which offers computers with digital arts, video and audio post-production, and office productivity software. This studio requires a reservation.

In 2020, the Heritage Studio began the Memvelope service. With this service, residents of Pinellas County can drop-off items to be digitized at no cost. A variety of formats are accepted for digitization, including VHS, cassettes, vinyl records, 16mm film, Super 8, photographs, and negatives.

== Awards and honors ==
In 2020, the library system's Prison Letter Program was awarded the Florida Library Association's Intellectual Freedom Award. The program answers reference questions and provides research assistance to prison inmates throughout Florida.

== Branches ==
| Name | Address | Image |
|---|---|---|
| Beach Branch | 69 Bay Esplanade Clearwater | The Beach Branch |
| Countryside Branch | 2642 Sabal Springs Dr Clearwater | |
| East Community Branch | 2465 Drew St Clearwater | New Clearwater Library East Branch at SPC |
| Main Library | 100 North Osceola Ave Clearwater | |
| North Greenwood Library | 905 N Martin Luther King Jr. Ave | |

== Directors of the Clearwater Public Library System ==
| Year | Name |
|---|---|
| 1911 | Miss Thomson |
| 1911 | Margaret Duncan |
| 1913 | Marie Allen |
| 1914 | Miss Garrett |
| 1915 | Margaret Duncan |
| 1916 | Margaret Duncan & Constance Chase (apprentice) |
| 1918 | Constance Chase |
| 1920 | Grace Mease |
| 1932 | Annie Owen |
| 1942 | Sarah Byers |
| 1971 | Elliott Hardaway |
| 1976 | Althea Andersen (Interim) |
| 1978 | Nancy Zussy |
| 1980 | Aleta Cozart (Interim) |
| 1981 | Linda Mielke |
| 1991 | Althea Andersen, Linda Lange, Marsha McGrath, Carolyn Moore (co-directors) |
| 1992 | Arlita Hallam |
| 1999 | John Szabo |
| 2005 | Barbara Pickell |
| 2017 | Jennifer Obermaier |
