= African-American Research Library and Cultural Center =

Public library in Fort Lauderdale, Florida, USA

- African-American Research Library and Cultural Center
- 26.129045955644468°N 80.17575790270564°W
- Location: Fort Lauderdale, Florida, United States
- Established: October 26, 2002
- Branch of: Broward County Library

Other information
- Website: www.broward.org/Library/Pages/default.aspx

The African-American Research Library and Cultural Center is a library located at 2650 Sistrunk Boulevard in Fort Lauderdale, Florida, in the United States. A branch of the Broward County Library, it opened on October 26, 2002.

== The library building ==
The 60,000-square-foot (5,600 m^{2}) facility has a 300-seat auditorium, 5,000-square-foot art gallery, and Small Business Resource Center. Since its opening, the center has hosted more than 38 major exhibits and served more than 895,000 customers. It is the sixth-largest library in the Broward County Library System and the third of its kind in the nation.

=== History ===
Samuel F. Morrison, while director of the Broward County Libraries Division, was inspired to build an ethnically-focused library after a visit to the Auburn Avenue Research Library on African American Culture and History. At that time, the Auburn Avenue Research Library and the Schomburg Center for Research in Black Culture in New York City were the only two research libraries in African-American culture in the nation. Morrison, however, was determined to "build a library in the African-American area, with county funds."

=== Funding ===
Between 1990 and 1995, Morrison engaged in numerous conversations and negotiations with county officials on the construction of the library. Funds had already been saved to replace the smaller Von D. Mizell Branch Library in Fort Lauderdale. The Broward County Commission had provided the land and $5 million towards the new library. Morrison, however, had plans for a much larger library and research facility and needed an additional $7 million to complete his vision.

The remaining funds were received largely through fundraising. A $600,000 grant was issued by the National Endowment for the Humanities and was matched by other organizations and philanthropists, such as the Sun-Sentinel, Blockbuster Entertainment Group, and Dianne and Michael Bienes. $50,000 was donated by The Links and $250,000 donated by Publix Charities. Businessman, Wayne Huizenga donated $1 million towards the library. Additional funds were raised from churches, clubs, and other interested organizations.

=== Construction ===
The groundbreaking ceremony occurred on October 23, 1999. After additional fundraising, construction of the building began in April 2001. PAWA Complex International – the largest African-American-owned architectural company in Florida – created the architectural design of the facility. Cecil Hayes – the first African American listed in the Architectural Digest top 100 – created the building's interior design and the artistic designer was Gary Moore. According to Morrison, over 50 percent of the construction contracts were done by African-American corporations. On October 26, 2002, the construction of the AARLCC was complete and finally opened to the public.

== AARLCC Special Collections ==
The African American Research Library's Special Collections houses over one million items, including rare books, artifacts, artwork, manuscripts, photographs, and reference materials focusing on the history and culture of people of African, African-American and Caribbean descent. African artifacts from the collection can be viewed in 3D through the use of Augmented reality (AR) via the Virtual AARLCC project, which was funded by a Library Services and Technology Act grant in order to expand access to the library's unique Special Collections.

Notable collections in the archive include:

- Alex Haley Collection – Contains the works of Alex Haley, photos from the Roots television show, photos of West Africa, and eight unfinished manuscripts by Haley. Portions of this collection are available on the Broward County Library website in its Digital Archives.
- Daniel Johnson Collection - Contains over 5,000 volumes pertaining to “African-American, Caribbean, Oceania and African Books and Ephemera.” These include writings in a variety of topics such as, slavery, civil rights, sports, politics, and the arts. Authors in this collection include: Leopold Sedar Senghot, Angela Davis, John Hope Franklin, James B. Duke, James Weldon Johnson, and Maya Angelou.<\
- Dorothy Porter Wesley Collection – Contains the library and papers of Dorothy Porter Wesley, one of the most important librarians of the 20th century, who collected research materials on art, Black history, women's studies, and Africans in the United States.
- Sixto Campano Collection – Contains 1,000 pieces of sheet music dating from the mid nineteenth century to World War II documenting the history of African-Americans in theatre.
- Kitty Oliver Oral Histories – Contains printed transcripts, photographs and videos of over 100 interviews from individuals discussing race relations in Broward and Palm Beach Counties during the 1960s and 1970s. Portions of this collection are available on the Broward County Library website in its Digital Archives.
- Hewitt Haitian Art Collection – Contains several pieces of art donated by John and Vivian Hewitt, who amassed one of the largest collections of Haitian art in the nation, as well as the Hewitt's personal books and papers.

== Ashley Bryan Art Series ==
The Ashley Bryan Art Series is one of AARLCC's signature events, established in 2002. The Ashley Bryan Art Series honors Ashley Bryan's commitment to creating books wherein children of color could see themselves and their culture. Dr. Henrietta M. Smith, Professor Emerita at the University of South Florida, School of Information, worked with Ashley Bryan to establish a children's book author and illustrator art series. "The series began with Ashley Bryan submitting eight original art pieces to the library to serve as core of the art collection." It became "a children's book author and illustrator series which has brought Coretta Scott King Award winning authors and illustrators whose work reflected African culture to the library". "The Ashley Bryan Art series has had a long-lasting cultural effect upon the community, bringing children and families into the library and engaging youth with children’s book art and illustrations." In 2012, the African American Research Library and Cultural Center commemorated 10 years of the Ashley Bryan Art series. Each year, the invited illustrator donates an original piece of artwork to the AARLCC Special Collections' Ashley Bryan Art Series Collection.

"The Ashley Bryan Project: A Resource of Exceptional Children's Books and Book Art by Authors / Illustrators of African Descent" launched in the spring of 2021 and "offers useful information for scholars, students, parents, art aficionados and those who simply love great children's books." The project comes from the work of author and illustrator Ashley Bryan and Dr. Henrietta Smith and was funded by a 2020 American Library Association Carnegie-Whitney Grant, which "provides funds for the preparation of popular and/or scholarly reading lists, webliographies, indexes, and other library resources used by all library patrons in the United States." Among the fifteen author/illustrators who received the Coretta Scott King Book Award included in this project are Kadir Nelson, Javaka Steptoe, Charles Smith, Jr., E.B. Lewis and Laura Freeman. The Ashley Bryan Project Resource Guide "includes an annotated reading list, digital images of original children's book art by the Ashley Bryan Art Series illustrators, themed book lists, information on higher education and careers in the arts, how to become a published author or illustrator, and class instruction guides."
