= Connie May Fowler =

American poet (born 1960)

- Born: January 3, 1960 (age 66)
- Education: University of Tampa (BA); University of Kansas (MA)
- Occupations: Novelist; essayist; memoirist; screenwriter; poet
- Writing career
- Genre: Magic realism
- Website: www.conniemayfowler.com

Connie May Fowler (born January 3, 1960) is an American novelist, essayist, memoirist, screenwriter, and poet. Her semi-autobiographical novel, Before Women had Wings, received the 1996 Southern Book Critics Circle Award and the Francis Buck Award (National League of American Pen Women). She adapted the novel for Oprah Winfrey and the subsequent Emmy-winning film starred Winfrey, Ellen Barkin, Julia Stiles, and Tina Majorino. Remembering Blue received the Chautauqua South Literary Award. Three of Fowler's novels were Dublin International Literary Award nominees. Her other novels include Sugar Cage and River of Hidden Dreams. The Problem with Murmur Lee was Redbook's premier book club selection. Her memoir, When Katie Wakes, explores her family's generational cycle of domestic violence. How Clarissa Burden Learned to Fly, a novel often compared to Virginia Woolf's Mrs. Dalloway in term of its structure, was published in 2010. Her latest book, a memoir titled "A Million Fragile bones," was published April 20, 2017 by Twisted Road Publications. It explores her life on an isolated barrier island and the horrific impact and aftermath of the BP Deepwater Horizon oil spill. Her books have been translated into eighteen languages.

Booklist says of "A Million Fragile Bones, "Fowler's elegy to her lost home and chronicle of BP's criminal negligence and the toxic decimation of this coastal haven is uniquely intimate and affecting in its precise elucidation of this tragic, largely invisible apocalypse, offering powerful testimony to the unacceptable risks and profound consequences of reckless oil drilling."

Fowler's essays, touching on a wide range of topics such as family history, the environment, child abuse, domestic violence, Sumo wrestling, popular culture, music, personal relationships, and food have been published in a variety of publications including The New York Times, The Times, Japan Times, International Herald Tribune, Oxford American, Best Life, "The Sun Magazine," and Forum.

In 2007, Fowler performed at New York City's The Players Club with actresses Kathleen Chalfont, Penny Fuller, and others in a performance based on The Other Woman, an anthology that includes Fowler's essay “The Uterine Blues.” In 2003, Fowler performed in a charity benefit performance of The Vagina Monologues with Jane Fonda and Rosie Perez.

Other publications her work has been cited in include Reclaiming Class: Women Poverty, And the Promise of Higher Education in America, essay by Nell Sullivan, Temple University Press, 2003; Poverty and Children's Adjustment (Developmental Clinical Psychology and Psychiatry) by Suniya Luthar, Transforming Nurses' Stress and Anger: Steps Toward Healing by Sandra P. Thomas, Ph.D., Editors on Editing: What Writers Need to Know About What Editors Do by Gerald C. Gross, Reading Adoption: Family and Difference in Fiction and Drama by Marianne Novy, Secrets of the Zona Rosa: How Writing (and Sisterhood) Can Change Women's Lives by Rosemary Daniell, The Tomorrow Trap: Unlocking the Secrets of the Procrastination-Protection Syndrome by Karen Peterson, The Book Lover's Cookbook: Recipes Inspired by Celebrated Works of Literature, and the Passages That Feature Them by Shaunda Kennedy Wenger, and Oprah Winfrey (Just the Facts Biographies) by Katherine E. Krohn.

Fowler graduated Chamberlain High School in Tampa, Florida in 1976.

Fowler splits her time between Florida, the Yucatan, and Vermont. She earned a Bachelor of Arts (English Literature) from the University of Tampa and a Masters of Arts (English Literature with an Emphasis in Creative Writing) from the University of Kansas where she studied with the novelist Carolyn Doty.

Her most recent memoir, A Million Fragile Bones, was released in April 2017. Her most recent novel, How Clarissa Burden Learned to Fly, was published by Grand Central/Hachette Book Group in April 2010. Her short story "Do Not Enter the Memory" was published in the fall/2010 edition of Oxford American. An excerpt from A Million Fragile Bones was published in the January 2017 issue of The Sun Magazine.

Fowler is a core faculty member of the MFA in Writing program at the Vermont College of Fine Arts and directs their VCFA Novel Retreat. She, along with her husband Bill Hinson, are founders and directors of the Yucatan Writing Conference (formerly the St. Augustine Writers Conference).

Fowler's papers are held at the Bienes Museum of the Modern Book in the rare book department of the Broward County Library in Fort Lauderdale, Florida, United States.

== Works ==
=== Novels and memoirs ===
- A Million Fragile Bones, 2017
- How Clarissa Burden Learned to Fly, 2010
- The Problem with Murmur Lee, 2005
- When Katie Wakes, 2002
- Remembering Blue, 2000
- Before Women had Wings, 1996
- River of Hidden Dreams, 1994
- Sugar Cage, 1992

=== Poetry ===
- "Two Thing Thing Poets: Steve Sleboda and Connie May," UT Review, Vol. 5, 1977.
- “A Soliloquy of a Seven Year Old,” “Crowded Closets,” Ann Arbor Review, Vol. 27, Washtenaw Community College, 1977.
- “You Have Created Me,” Goethe's Notes: A Literary Magazine, Vol. 6, 1978.
- “A Purity of Crabs,” “America: The Invitation and Rejection,” “A Celebration of Nothingness,” Outside the Museum: Contemporary Writings — An Anthology, Ann Arbor Review, Vol. 28, Washtenaw Community College, 1978.
- “Genetic Lace,” “The Fear,” Open Twenty-four Hours: Collective Consciousness, Vol. 3, 1984.
- “Kateland,” “Ybor City Number One,” The Midwest Quarterly, A Journal of Contemporary Thought, Vol. XXIX, Pittsburg State University, 1988.
- “Homesick,” Roberts Writing Awards 1988, The H.G. Roberts Foundation, 1988.
