= Susan Butler =

Susan Butler may refer to:

- Susan Dart Butler (1888–1959), American librarian
- Susan Butler (American writer) (born 1932)
- Susan M. Butler (born 1948), Australian lexicographer
- Susan Bulkeley Butler, American businesswoman
