= Maria Chavez-Hernandez =

American librarian & educator (1950–2008)

- Occupations: Librarian; reformer; advocate

Maria Chavez-Hernandez (1950 – March 19, 2008) was an American librarian, educator, and advocate for information and library access for immigrant and underserved populations.

== Personal life and education ==
Chavez-Hernandez was born in Managua, Nicaragua, and became the oldest of 11 children. She received her bachelor's degree in psychology from the University of Puerto Rico (1972), a Master of Library Science from the University of Pittsburgh (1979), and her Ph.D. in Library Science and Information Studies from Florida State University (1991). She worked as a librarian in Puerto Rico and Florida.

She married Miguel Hernandez and had three daughters. In 2008, she died of cancer.

== Librarianship ==
Chavez-Hernandez was an active member of the Florida Library Association, the Association for Library and Information Science Education (ALISE), the National Education Association (NEA), and the National Association to Promote Library Services to Latinos and the Spanish Speaking (REFORMA). She worked as a Library and Information Science professor at Florida State University until her death. Her tenure at Florida State University focused on her work with immigrant populations.

=== Contributions to the Florida Association for Volunteer Action in the Caribbean and the Americas ===
Chavez-Hernandez volunteered as FAVACA's Internet consultant for five years, during which time she worked on connecting information repositories, improving Internet skills, and improving student access to information in Belize. In the Dominican Republic, she developed a research center and a cultural center for children. While in the Dominican Republic, she worked closely with President Leonel Fernández, who was interested in having her consult with the country's national library service. In Nicaragua, she gave workshops on how to better utilize Internet searching. Specifically, she worked on the following projects.

- Library Science Focus on Dominican Republic Training
- Fundacion Sur Futuro Builds Sustainable Programs
- Dominican Republic Receives Library Science Training
- Florida Information Specialists Train Belizean Counterparts
- Florida Information Specialists Guide Library Development in Belize
- Professor Offers Computer Skills in her Native Nicaragua

== Legacy ==
The Florida Library Association created an award to honor Dr. Chavez-Hernandez. Specifically, the award is the "Maria Chavez-Hernandez Libraries Change Peoples Lives Award" to celebrate the "dynamic spirit of her work in expanding the opportunities of information access to under-served and immigrant populations" by rewarding librarians who have "made a demonstrably positive and big difference in the lives of Florida's library users."

== Publications ==
- Chávez-Hernández, M. (1996). "The establishment of a library networking model for the Caribbean region: a Delphi study". Journal of Interlibrary Loan, Document Delivery & Electronic Reserves, 7(2), 51–75.
- Chavez-Hernandez, M. M., & Rodriguez-Mori, H. H. (2007). "Spanish Language Subject Headings: Their Impact on Information Access". Alcts Papers on Library Technical Services and Collections, (14), 66–75.
