= John Szabo =

American librarian

John F. Szabo
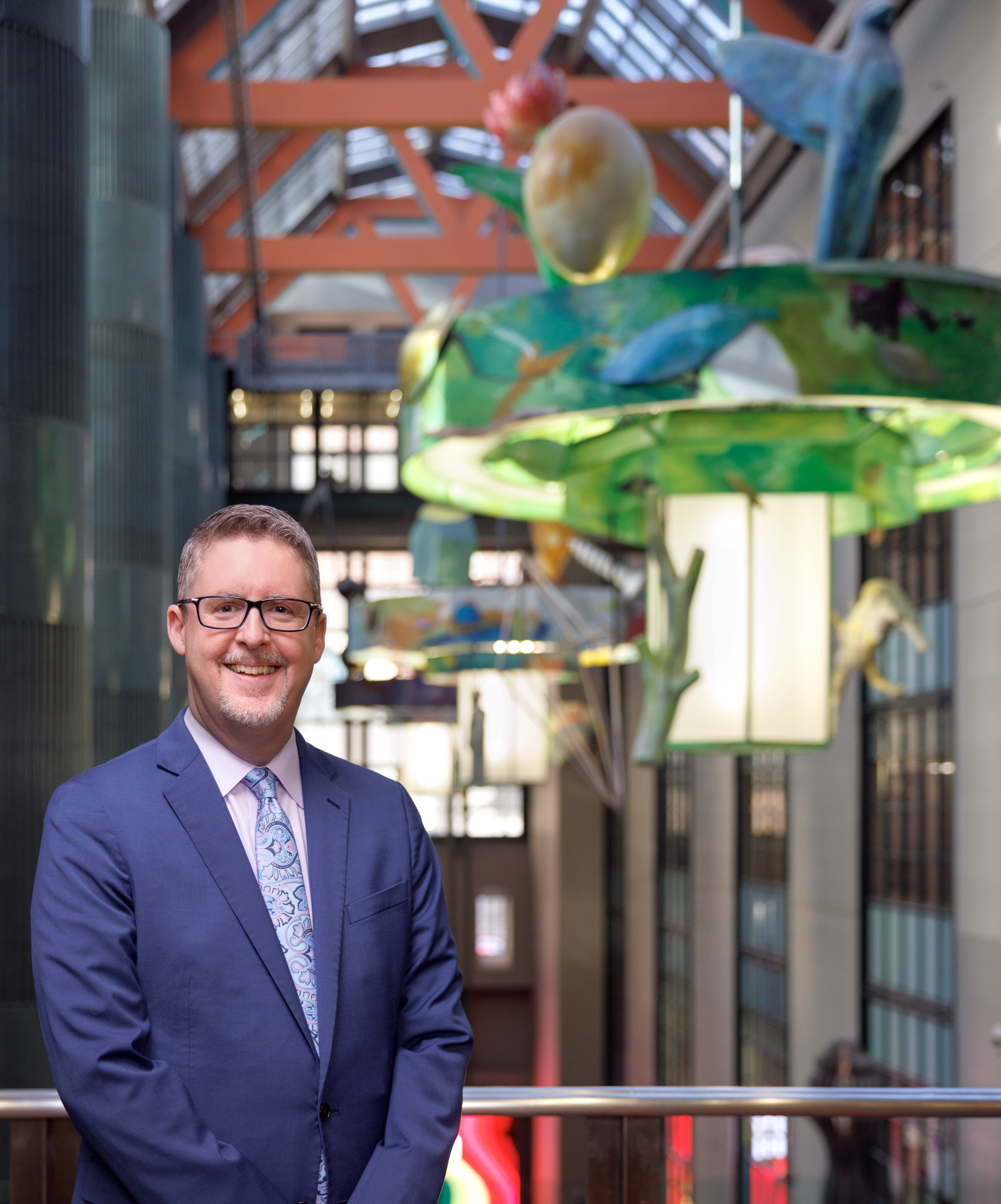
- John F. Szabo in the Tom Bradley wing of Los Angeles Public Library's Central Library.
- Born: 1968 (age 57–58); Orlando, Florida, U.S.
- Occupation: Librarian

John F. Szabo (born 1968) is an American librarian, library executive, and the twentieth City Librarian of Los Angeles, the chief executive of the Los Angeles Public Library. He previously served as the Director of the Atlanta-Fulton Public Library System, Clearwater (FL) Public Library System, Palm Harbor (FL) Public Library, and the Robinson (IL) Public Library District. In 2015, the Los Angeles Public Library won the National Medal for Museum and Library Service, the nation's highest honor for a library or museum. Awarded by the Institute for Museum and Library Services (IMLS), the medal was presented by First Lady Michelle Obama at a White House ceremony.

== Biography ==
Szabo was born in Orlando, Florida, and grew up in Montgomery, Alabama. At age 16, Szabo started working as a library clerk at Gunter Air Force Base in Montgomery.

Szabo received his bachelor's degree in telecommunications from the University of Alabama and his master's degree in information and library studies at the University of Michigan.

Szabo was appointed director of the public library district serving the city of Robinson and Crawford County, Illinois. His experience then extended to the Atlanta-Fulton Public Library System (Director 2005-2012), Clearwater Public Library System in Florida, and Palm Harbor Public Library, also in Florida. During his Florida tenure, he served as Florida Library Association president. Szabo became City Librarian of Los Angeles in 2012.

== Honors ==
- Betsy Plank Distinguished Achievement Award from the University of Alabama College of Communication and Information Sciences (2020)
- Featured in New York Times best seller and Washington Post top 10 book of the year The Library Book by Susan Orlean (2019)
- Named as a "Culture Czar" in "The Gay List: 50 Icons and Iconoclasts Who are Transforming the City." Los Angeles Magazine, Pride Issue (2019)
- Award of recognition from the University of Guadalajara Foundation and the Universidad de Guadalajara for support of the Mexican community of Los Angeles
- Alumni Achievement Award, University of Michigan School of Information (2010)
- Librarian of the Year, Library Journal (2025)

== Publications ==
- Szabo, John, (2009) Death and Dying: An Annotated Bibliography of the Thanatological Literature., Scarecrow Press, ISBN 978-0810872752
- Szabo, John, (2015) The Bayeux Tapestry: A Critically Annotated Bibliography., Rowman & Littlefield Publishers, ISBN 978-1442251557
