= Florida Libraries =

- Discipline: Library science
- Language: English

Publication details
- Publisher: Florida Library Association (United States)
- Frequency: Bi-annually

Standard abbreviations
- ISO 4: Fla. Libr.

Indexing
- ISSN: 0046-4147
- OCLC no.: 423607607

Florida Libraries began publication in July, 1949. It is the official journal of the Florida Library Association and is published bi-annually. The journal publishes articles related to librarianship in Florida, and while some of them are scholarly, others will are informal in tone and content. The journal has an open access policy, meaning that it is available freely upon publication. Past issues are archived on their website, and they are available in pdf format.

The journal accepts manuscripts from librarians throughout the Southeastern United States, but gives preference to submissions from librarians affiliated with Florida libraries and institutions. Part of the journal's mission is to create a space for Florida librarians to be published, as well as to provide support for the region's professionals with its content. Articles include "original research, case studies, literature reviews, reflective essays, conference reports, student scholarship, and book reviews." Articles cover challenges and ideas regarding librarianship in public, academic, and special collections settings. Articles also cover archival resources in Florida.

== History ==
Prior to the Florida Libraries publication, the Florida Library Association first published the Florida Library Bulletin from 1927 through 1935. Florida Libraries became the successor to this initial publication, arising 14 years afterward. Though Florida Libraries began its run in July of 1949, the journal suspended publication between October 1949 and June 1951 for reasons that are unclear.

Regular publication of Florida Libraries began in the later 20th century, with the earliest available digital copy of the journal being from 1998.

Marcia Gebhardt was editor for 2013- 2018. Karen Urbec was editor from 2019-2022. Vanessa Reyes was editor in 2023.

In 2024, Mary Daniels became editor-in-chief of Florida Libraries and noted that the goals and content of the publication would remain in line with previous goals and content published in the journal.

In 2026, Jorge Perez became editor-in-chief.

Archives of the journal are held at the University of South Florida Tampa Library.
