= Archie L. McNeal =

Academic librarian (1912 – 1999)

Archie Liddell McNeal (1912 – 1999) was an academic librarian, university library director, and leader in professional library associations.

== Education and career ==
McNeal was born September 3, 1912, in Ruleville, Mississippi. He earned the B.S. in library science from Peabody Library School in 1936 and the Ph.D. from the University of Chicago Graduate Library School in 1951.

McNeal began his library career in Tennessee at East Tennessee State College and the University of Tennessee. During this period, he was president of the Tennessee Library Association (1940–42).

He served in the U.S. Army from 1942 to 1946 during World War II.

After military service he returned to East Tennessee State College, where he had been librarian before the war and had been placed on military leave. He later worked at the University of Tennessee.

In 1952, McNeal was appointed the first director of libraries at the University of Miami in Coral Gables, Florida. He oversaw the planning and construction of the Otto G. Richter Library which opened in 1962. He retired in 1979.

== Professional activity ==
McNeal served in many elected positions in the American Library Association. He served on its executive board and council in the 1960s. He chaired the Intellectual Freedom Committee. He was also president of both the Library Administration Division and the Association of College and Research Libraries.

He was a founding member and president of the Association of Caribbean University, Research, and Institutional Libraries.

During his career he was also active in the states in which he worked, elected president of the Tennessee Library Association (1940–1942) and the Florida Library Association (1958–1959).

== Selected publications ==
- McNeal, Archie L. (March 1953). "Library Service to Rural Areas: A Proposal". Rural Sociology. 18: 61–64.
- McNeal, Archie L. (October 1954). "Financial Problems of University Libraries". College & Research Libraries. 15 (4): 407–20.
- McNeal, Archie L. (May 1959). "Academic and Research Libraries in India". College & Research Libraries. 20 (3): 243–49. doi:10.5860/crl_20_03_243. hdl:2142/37159.
- McNeal, Archie L. (1961). "Divisional Organization in the University Library". In Vandiver, LaNelle (ed.). University of Tennessee Library Lectures, Numbers Ten, Eleven, and Twelve, 1958–1960. Knoxville: University of Tennessee. pp. 39–50.
- McNeal, Archie L. (April 1965). "Intellectual Freedom and Censorship". Teachers College Record. 66 (7): 547–58.
- McNeal, Archie L. (June 1965). "The Library in the South: Socioeconomic and Cultural Aspects". Wilson Library Bulletin. 39: 867–68+.
