= Helen Virginia Stelle =

American librarian (1884–1947)

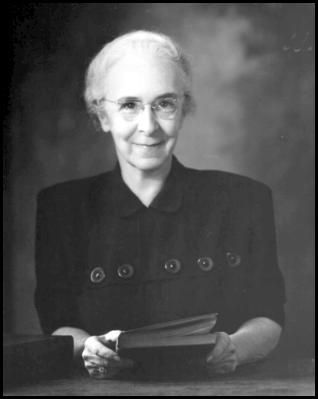
Helen Virginia Stelle

Helen Virginia Stelle (1884-September 21, 1947) was the first director of the Tampa Free Library (now the Tampa-Hillsborough County Public Library System) and one of the founders of the Florida Library Association.

== Early life and education ==
Stelle was born in 1884 in Alton, Illinois, to Oliver Stelle and Clara Cotter Stelle. She attended school and was a librarian at Shurtleff College in Illinois from 1903 to 1906. Stelle moved to Brooklyn, New York where she received her degree in librarianship in 1913 from the Pratt Institute School of Library Science. Afterwards, she went to Wisconsin where she worked as a reference librarian for the Superior Public Library from 1914 to 1916.

== Director of Tampa Free library ==
In 1917, Stelle was hired by the Board of Trustees of the Tampa Free Library to serve as its first director. The brand new Tampa Free Library was funded by well known industrialist and philanthropist, Andrew Carnegie, who donated $50,000 for the library to be built, along with funds supplemented by the city. Although the library had been built by 1915, it officially opened in April 1917 and Stelle was in the receiving line, along with the Library Board, to greet its first visitors. In opening the new library, Stelle had the difficult task of not only buying the materials to stock the shelves but also in "selling" the idea of a library to the community. The location of the library was inconvenient for people to access and the residents of Tampa were at first, uninterested in any library services. Stelle was able to secure a donation of 4000 volumes from Mr. and Mrs. L.H. Lothridge to start the library collection and worked with Mayor Curtis Hixon to bring bus routes near the library to increase accessibility. Stelle oversaw the daily operations of the library which included organizing staff and selecting new materials. She also reported regularly to the Carnegie Corporation about the finances and state of the Carnegie libraries in Tampa.

After seven years as director, Stelle was able to add 25,621 books to the collection, as well as 141 periodical subscriptions. Her and her staff also conducted "story hours" for children at some of the local branches with a monthly attendance of over 1,000. More proof of her success was given in 1927, when Stelle presented to the Rotary Club in Tampa and showed how the library "operated at a lower cost per book and patron than any library in a city of like population". Under her direction, library service in the Tampa area expanded to included eight new branches and the addition of bookmobile service.

In 1932, Stelle took a leave of absence from the Tampa Free Library and traveled to Charleston, South Carolina, to oversee and organize the opening of a new library. Stelle was recommended for the task by the American Library Association due to her successful record in Tampa. While in Charleston, Stelle evaluated the current library staff and conditions of the facility. She noted that many of the staff, particularly those working at the African American branch, needed proper library training and that many files and records in the library were inaccurate or out of order. She recommended enlarging the library's collection and emphasized obtaining more children's books for their simplicity, perceiving county elementary students to process limited reading skills; and that Susan Dart Butler, founder of the African American branch, attend Hampton Institute, Hampton, Virginia, with pay for training in library science.

== Professional memberships ==
Stelle was also one of the founding members of the Florida Library Association, which traces its earliest beginnings to 1906 with meetings of the Teachers or Education Association. In 1920, she gathered library colleagues together for a meeting in Orlando to formally re-establish the Association and served as Chairman in 1920 and then President in 1922 and 1931. As part of her membership in the Florida Library Association, Stelle authored the 1935 "Florida Library Survey" which gave an account on the state of library service in Florida at the time. In it, Stelle sets several goals that Florida libraries should strive to meet including, better library service for elementary students, those whose reading ability is low, and resources for adult education.

In addition to her membership with the Florida Library Association, Stelle was also a member of the Florida State Library Board, the American Library Association, the Tampa Art Institute, and the Women's Club of Tampa. In 1930 she served as vice president of the Southeastern Library Association and in 1934, president of the Southwestern Library Association.

== Death ==
Stelle died on September 21, 1947, and was buried in her hometown of Alton, Illinois. A Tampa Tribune obituary stated she "devoted her life to the development of the public library system in Tampa".
