= Alphonse F. Trezza =

Alphonse F. Trezza (December 27, 1920 – July 15, 2009) was an American librarian, library administrator and educator.

Trezza served in the U.S. Air Forces from 1942 to 1945 as a first lieutenant in the Pacific Theater. He was awarded an Air Medal and clusters.

== Education and career ==
Trezza earned a B.A. from the University of Pennsylvania and the M.S. from Drexel University.

He was executive director of the Catholic Library Association and editor of Catholic Library World from 1956 to 1960.

He was associate executive director of the American Library Association from 1960 to 1967 and Illinois State Librarian from 1969 to 1974.

From 1974 to 1980 he was executive director of the National Commission on Libraries and Information Science and from 1980 to 1982 director of the intergovernmental library, Cooperation Project Federal Library Committee at the Library of Congress.

In 1982 he joined the faculty at Florida State University School of Library and Information Studies as a professor, a position he held until his retirement in 1993.

== Professional associations ==
Alphonse F. Trezza was active in many library associations and held leadership positions including:

- National Chairman Catholic Book Week, 1954—1956.
- Illinois Library Association chairman, legislative committee 1964—1969, and executive board member.
- President, Chicago Library Club 1969.
- American Library Association Executive Board, 1974-1979; Nominating Committee Chair 1988—1989; legislation committee 1989-1991.
- International Federation of Library Associations and Institutions-statistics committee 1976—1985.
- Association for Library and Information Science Education, government relations committee 1985—1987.
- Florida Library Association: President 1991—1992; Intellectual Freedom committee; editor Florida Libraries.

== Honors and awards ==
- Illinois Library Association: Special Librarian’s Citation in 1965; and Librarian’s Citation in 1974, Illinois Library Luminary Honor Roll.
- American Library Association Exceptional Achievement Award from the Association of Specialized and Cooperative Library Agencies in 1981; Joseph W. Lippincott Award in 1989 and American Library Association Honorary Membership in 2007.

Trezza received a Doctorate of Humane Letters (Honoris Causa) from Rosary College in River Forest, Illinois.

== Selected publications ==
- Trezza, A. F. (Ed.). (1990). Commitment to service: The library's mission. G. K. Hall.
- Trezza, A. F. (Ed.). (1985). Public libraries and the challenges of the next two decades. Libraries Unlimited.
- Trezza, A. F. (1974). Relationship and involvement of the state library agencies with the national program proposed by NCLIS (National Program for Libraries and Information Services, Related paper no. 1). National Commission on Libraries and Information Science.
- Trezza, A. F. (1972). Library buildings. ALA Editions.
