= Isiah C. Smith =

American judge

Isiah Courtney Smith
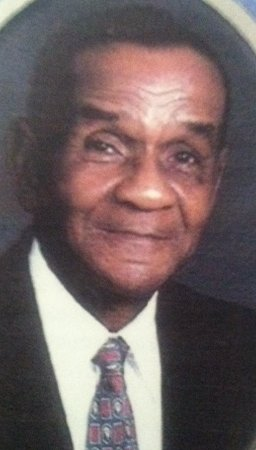
- Born: September 15, 1922; Lake Helen, Florida
- Died: February 29, 2012 (aged 89)
- Education: Florida A&M College, B.A. in history, 1947; Brooklyn Law School, 1954
- Occupations: Lawyer, Delray Beach City Prosecutor, Circuit Court Judge for Palm Beach County
- Spouse: Henrietta M. Smith

Isiah C. Smith (1922–2012) was a judge and civil rights attorney. He was Palm Beach County, Florida's third black lawyer. He and William Holland, Palm Beach County's first black attorney, fought successfully to integrate the county's schools, golf courses, department stores, airport taxi service, and the Florida Turnpike's restaurants and bathrooms through lawsuits and negotiations in the mid-1950s. While working with Holland at their practice, Smith also served part-time as Delray Beach City Prosecutor from 1970 to 1977. In 1986, he was appointed by Governor Bob Graham to become a circuit judge for Palm Beach County. He stepped down in 1992, having reached the age of 70, the mandatory retirement age in Florida for jurists.

== Early life ==
Born Isiah Courtney Smith on September 15, 1922, in a log cabin near Lake Helen, Florida, a small town near Sanford, and known to most who knew him as I.C., Smith walked eight miles to elementary school because "The city had a school bus for the whites, all our friends, and we had to walk." Consequently, his father bought land and eventually moved the family next to the black school. In 1940, he graduated from Euclid High School in Deland and enrolled at then Florida A&M College. While there he met William Holland, who would become Palm Beach County's first black attorney and a pioneer in Florida's civil rights movement. Smith and Holland promised each other that they would open a law practice in Florida to serve "the people of our community." However, before he could graduate, the United States entered World War II and Smith volunteered and was sent to the intake facility near Raiford.

Smith was at the facility for three weeks and had not been sworn in. Finally he marched through the segregated camp to the white officers and un-volunteered. A year later, he was drafted, and then rejected at the same camp. He suspected that they thought him to be a troublemaker. During the war he worked building locomotives in Chester, Pennsylvania, that were eventually sent to the Soviet Union. He returned to Florida A&M College after the war and soon met Henrietta Mays, a librarian at the college, who he was to marry. "He was very studious," she said. "He was the only student I knew who carried a dictionary in his back pocket all the time."

== Civil rights pioneer ==
After graduating with a history degree in 1947, Smith followed his wife-to-be to New York City, and they married on January 1, 1949. He enrolled at Brooklyn Law School, where he attended classes at night after working days in a factory making plastic horses. After he earned his law degree in 1954, his college friend Holland invited him back to Florida to join his practice in West Palm Beach. Smith became the county's third black lawyer. In 1955, the pair sued the West Palm Beach Commission to integrate the West Palm Beach municipal golf course. After initially losing their suit in the Palm Beach County courts, they won their case on appeal with the District Court of Appeals six months later.

In 1956 Holland and Smith sued the West Palm Beach School Board when Holland's six-year-old son was denied entrance to all-white Northboro Elementary, less than two miles from the Holland's home. After the county denied William Jr. entrance to the segregated school for two years, Holland and Smith filed a class-action suit. They fought their case in the courts for several years. To comply with one ruling, in 1961 Palm Beach County offered a plan that resulted in four black students transferring to white high schools. By 1965, of the county's 15,000 minority students, 137 attended predominantly white schools. The county's public schools were integrated by 1973.

In 1956 the law firm of Holland and Smith successfully fought to eliminate separate eating and bathroom facilities on the newly opened Florida Turnpike. By the late 1950s, they had also integrated the county's department stores and the airport's taxi service.

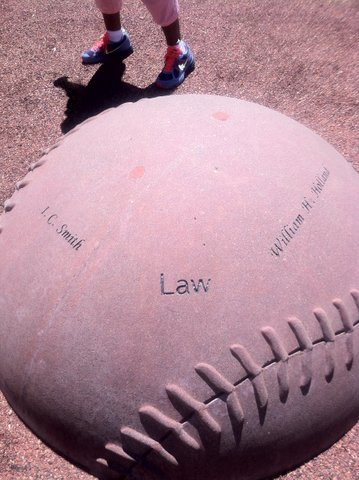
Judge I.C. Smith and William Holland honored on Baseball Memorial at Coleman Park, West Palm Beach

== Later years ==
Smith practiced law with Holland for 32 years, including the years that he was a Delray city prosecutor. He served in that position from 1970 until 1977, when Florida abolished municipal courts. He then applied for judgeships twice, to no avail, but did so once more. This time he was appointed by Gov. Bob Graham to be a circuit judge for Palm Beach County in July 1986. Two months later he was challenged by a Wellington, Florida lawyer for the four-year term. Smith won and was unopposed in 1990. Judge Smith left his position at the bench in September 1992. Florida law requires judges to retire after their 70th birthday.

Smith served as a church administrator at Trinity Methodist Church, West Palm Beach, and he sang in the Gospel Choir and the Male Choir. He also was a member of Phi Beta Sigma fraternity. Smith and his wife had two children; Robin, who became a Delray Beach police officer, and Cynthia, who is now a reverend. Smith and his partner William W. Holland were honored as Civil Rights pioneers in Coleman Park where Negro league legends played ball. Smith died on February 29, 2012, in Delray Beach, Florida at the age of 89.
