= Lake Helen, Florida =

- City
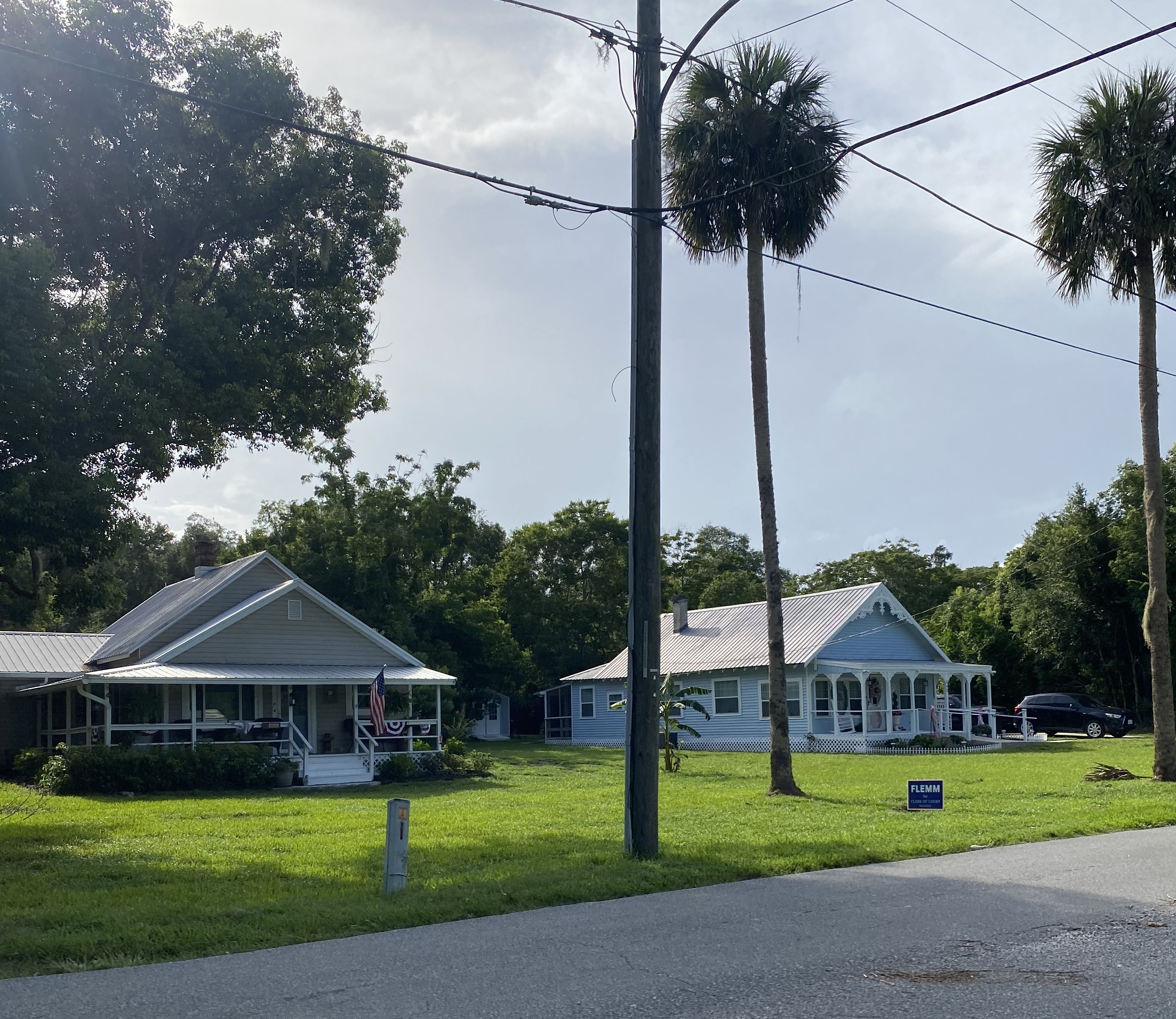
- A Lake Helen neighborhood in July 2024

- Seal
- Motto: "The Gem of Florida"
- Location in Volusia County and the state of Florida
- Coordinates: 28°59′30″N 81°14′45″W
- Country: United States
- State: Florida
- County: Volusia
- Settled (Prevatt Settlement): c. 1858–1883
- Founded (Lake Helen): c. 1884–1885
- Incorporated (City of Lake Helen): 1888

Government
  - Type: Commission-Manager
  - Mayor: Roger F. Eckert
  - Vice Mayor: Heather Rutledge
  - Commissioners: Earl Farmer, Sean P. Abshire, and Charlene Bishop
  - City Administrator: John K. Brant
  - City Clerk: Roxann Reid Goodman

Area
  - Total: 4.72 sq mi (12.23 km^{2})
  - Land: 4.56 sq mi (11.80 km^{2})
  - Water: 0.17 sq mi (0.43 km^{2})
- Elevation: 52 ft (16 m)

Population (2020)
  - Total: 2,842
  - Density: 624.1/sq mi (240.95/km^{2})
- Time zone: UTC-5 (Eastern (EST))
  - Summer (DST): UTC-4 (EDT)
- ZIP code: 32744
- Area code: 386
- FIPS code: 12-38025
- GNIS feature ID: 2404864
- Website: http://www.lakehelen.org/

Lake Helen is a city in Volusia County, Florida, United States. It is part of the Deltona–Daytona Beach–Ormond Beach, Florida Metropolitan Statistical Area. The population was 2,842 at the 2020 census.

== Geography ==
According to the United States Census Bureau, the city has a total area of 4.6 square miles (11.8 km^{2}), of which 4.4 square miles (11.5 km^{2}) is land and 0.12 square miles (0.3 km^{2}) (2.82%) is water.

=== Climate ===
The climate for the City of Lake Helen is characterized by hot, humid summers and generally mild to cool winters. According to the Köppen Climate Classification system, Lake Helen has a humid subtropical climate zone, abbreviated "Cfa" on climate maps.

== Demographics ==
Historical population
Census	Pop.	Note	%±
1900	203		—
1910	646		218.2%
1920	978		51.4%
1930	850		−13.1%
1940	587		−30.9%
1950	926		57.8%
1960	1,096		18.4%
1970	1,303		18.9%
1980	2,047		57.1%
1990	2,344		14.5%
2000	2,743		17.0%
2010	2,624		−4.3%
2020	2,842		8.3%
U.S. Decennial Census

=== Racial and ethnic composition ===
Lake Helen racial composition (Hispanics excluded from racial categories) (NH = Non-Hispanic)
Race	Pop 2010	Pop 2020	% 2010	% 2020
White (NH)	2,209	2,320	84.18%	81.63%
Black or African American (NH)	240	194	9.15%	6.83%
Native American or Alaska Native (NH)	4	2	0.15%	0.07%
Asian (NH)	9	4	0.34%	0.14%
Pacific Islander or Native Hawaiian (NH)	0	2	0.00%	0.07%
Some other race (NH)	9	8	0.34%	0.28%
Two or more races/Multiracial (NH)	39	116	1.49%	4.08%
Hispanic or Latino (any race)	114	196	4.34%	6.90%
Total	2,624	2,842		

=== 2020 census ===
As of the 2020 census, Lake Helen had a population of 2,842. The median age was 50.2 years. 17.8% of residents were under the age of 18 and 25.3% of residents were 65 years of age or older. For every 100 females there were 87.8 males, and for every 100 females age 18 and over there were 86.4 males age 18 and over.

As of 2020, 61.1% of residents lived in urban areas, while 38.9% lived in rural areas.

In 2020, there were 1,200 households in Lake Helen, of which 24.3% had children under the age of 18 living in them. Of all households, 47.0% were married-couple households, 16.0% were households with a male householder and no spouse or partner present, and 28.9% were households with a female householder and no spouse or partner present. About 26.2% of all households were made up of individuals and 12.4% had someone living alone who was 65 years of age or older.

In 2020, there were 1,314 housing units, of which 8.7% were vacant. The homeowner vacancy rate was 3.2% and the rental vacancy rate was 5.6%.

According to the 2020 American Community Survey, there were 650 families residing in the city.

=== 2010 census ===
As of the 2010 United States census, there were 2,624 people, 1,049 households, and 767 families residing in the city.

=== 2000 census ===
As of the census of 2000, there were 2,743 people, 1,124 households, and 774 families residing in the city. The population density was 650.1 inhabitants per square mile (251.0/km^{2}). There were 1,204 housing units at an average density of 285.3 per square mile (110.2/km^{2}). The racial makeup of the city was 87.02% White, 10.68% African American, 0.29% Native American, 0.29% Asian, 0.04% Pacific Islander, 0.95% from other races, and 0.73% from two or more races. Hispanic or Latino of any race were 2.95% of the population.

In 2000, there were 1,124 households, out of which 26.0% had children under the age of 18 living with them, 52.0% were married couples living together, 12.8% had a female householder with no husband present, and 31.1% were non-families. 25.7% of all households were made up of individuals, and 11.2% had someone living alone who was 65 years of age or older. The average household size was 2.44 and the average family size was 2.91.

In 2000, in the city, the population was spread out, with 22.3% under the age of 18, 6.7% from 18 to 24, 24.6% from 25 to 44, 25.7% from 45 to 64, and 20.7% who were 65 years of age or older. The median age was 43 years. For every 100 females, there were 89.8 males. For every 100 females age 18 and over, there were 85.1 males.

In 2000, the median income for a household in the city was $34,577, and the median income for a family was $39,688. Males had a median income of $30,000 versus $22,774 for females. The per capita income for the city was $17,158. About 7.5% of families and 9.7% of the population were below the poverty line, including 9.4% of those under age 18 and 11.2% of those age 65 or over.

== Media ==
An episode of WCW Monday Nitro from February 17, 1997, featured a home movie filmed during the preceding week by NWO members Kevin Nash, Scott Hall and Syxx. In the video the three are driving through Lake Helen as the city's name appears on the side of a building that is captured on the video. The NWO members cross paths with the Steiner Brothers in their car and run them off the road.

== Notable people ==
- Isiah C. Smith, a civil rights attorney and leader who was born in Lake Helen.
