= North Greenwood Cemetery =

Historically African American cemetery in Clearwater, Florida, US

- Interactive map of North Greenwood Cemetery

Details
- Established: 1940
- Closed: 1954
- Location: Clearwater, Florida
- Country: United States
- Coordinates: 27°58′40″N 82°47′08″W
- Owned by: City of Clearwater
- Size: 1.5 acres (0.61 ha)
- No. of interments: over 375

North Greenwood Cemetery was a historically African American cemetery in North Greenwood neighborhood of Clearwater, Florida, United States. The cemetery covered about 1.5 acres (0.61 ha). In 1954, some of the bodies were relocated and the site turned over to the local school board. The Palmetto Elementary School was constructed on the site. In 2021, researchers found evidence of 29 graves remaining at the site.

== Reclamation and Historical marker ==
Founded in 1940 to be the burial place of African American residents of Clearwater, the cemetery comprised 1.5 acres (0.61 ha). In 1954, to make room for additional school buildings and a city pool, approximately 375 graves were moved from the site. Residents had suspected that not all of the graves had been moved. The City of Clearwater partnered with archeologists and historians in 2021. Their work revealed that 29 graves remained, containing human remains.

A historical marker was placed on the site in December 2022.
