= Christine Wigfall Morris =

American librarian

- Morris in 2010
- Born: March 24, 1922; Register, Georgia
- Died: December 7, 2014 (aged 92); Clearwater, Florida
- Occupation: Librarian
- Known for: First African American librarian in Clearwater, Florida
- Spouse: Willie J. Morris
- Parent(s): Eddie and Hattie Wigfall

Christine Wigfall Morris (March 24, 1922 – December 7, 2014) was an American librarian. She was the first African American to become a librarian in Clearwater, Florida. She was known for inspiring a whole generation of local children to read.

== Career ==
In 1949, Morris was employed by the city of Clearwater, Florida, to work at its main library, making her the first African American to work as a librarian in that municipality. Before being hired, she had never set foot inside a library due to the segregation laws of that time. Soon afterwards, she became the director of the "Negro Library", which opened in 1950. A local resident, Horace Carson, had convinced the City Commission to fund the new library, after which he asked Morris to work there.

As director of the newly founded library, Morris undertook all tasks, including storytelling and even sweeping. She often had to lobby for additional books, encouraging the children to read and learn as much as they could. She also helped upgrade the library's location from a tiny rented space to a larger official one in 1962. The architect who designed the new building was Eugene Beach. Morris asked him to construct a structure with a circular shape so she could "supervise library activities by herself if necessary." The building was renamed the North Greenwood Library in 1983 after she retired.

In addition to her library duties, Morris helped increase voter registration and prepare students for high school equivalency tests. Even after her retirement in 1983, she remained involved in local committees. She asked that the city rethink its decision about reducing library hours, so children would not be denied access.

In 2010, she co-wrote the volume "Christine Wigfall Morris: Stories of Family, Community, and History" to document her experiences. She also has a book collection named after her at the North Greenwood Library.

== Background ==
Morris was born on March 24, 1922, in Register, Georgia to parents Eddie and Hattie Wigfall. She also had a sister named Louise. In 1926, the family moved to Clearwater, Florida, where her parents opened a dry cleaning business. She attended a segregated high school, graduating in 1941. She then studied home economics and English at Bethune-Cookman University. She was married to Willie J. Morris and they had no children. She died on December 7, 2014.
