= Samuel F. Morrison =

American librarian

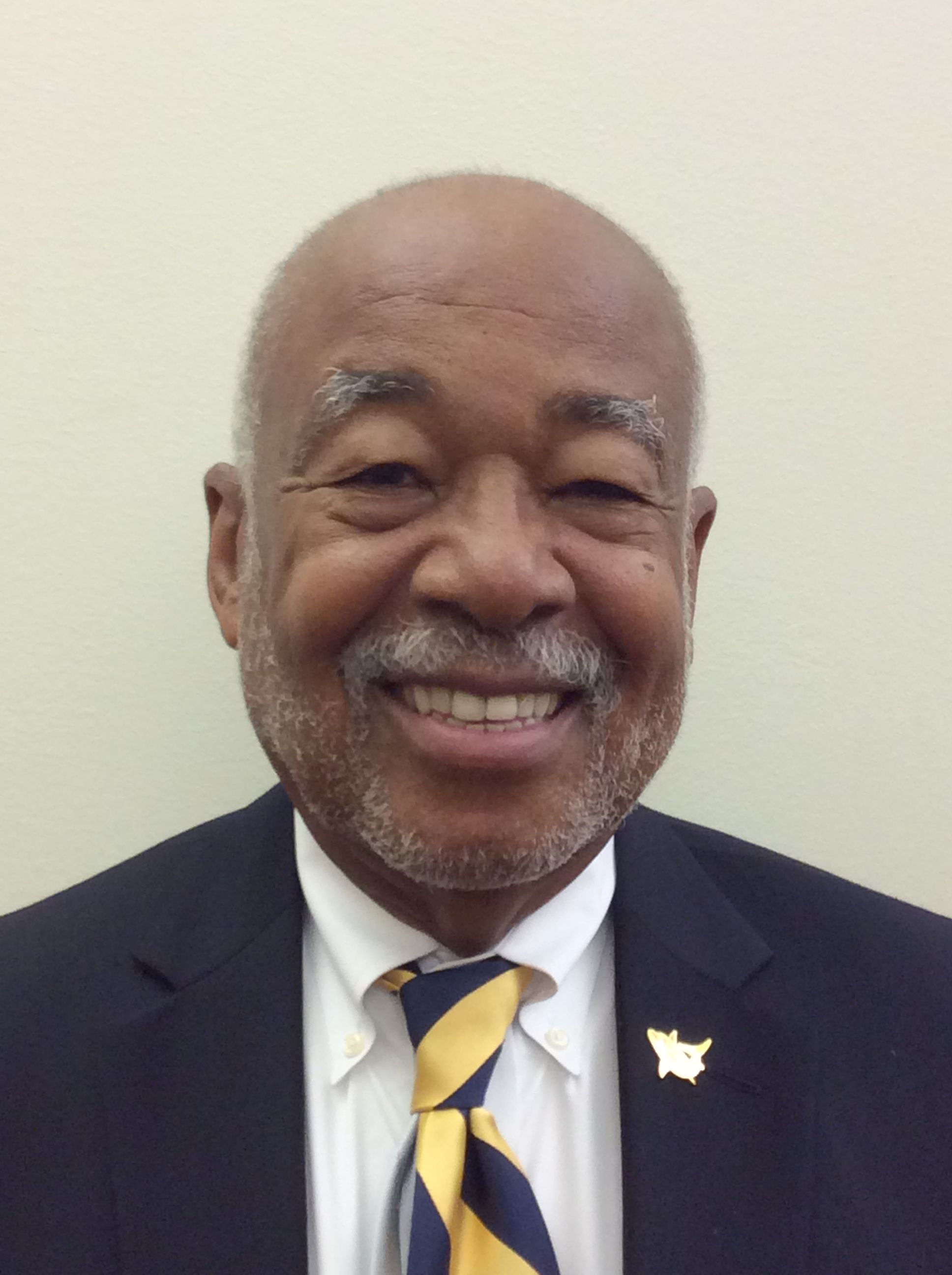
- Born: December 19, 1936 (age 89); Flagstaff, Arizona, US
- Education: Compton Junior College (AA), California State University (BA), University of Illinois (MLS)
- Occupations: Library director, librarian

Samuel F. Morrison (born December 19, 1936) is an American librarian. Morrison was director of the Broward County Library system for 13 years and the catalyst behind the system's establishment of the African-American Research Library and Cultural Center. He also served as the chief librarian of the Chicago Public Library from 1987 to 1989, overseeing the design and construction of the Harold Washington Library.

== Early life and education ==
Samuel F. Morrison was born in Flagstaff, Arizona, on December 19, 1936. He grew up in Phoenix, Arizona. Morrison received an associate degree from Compton Junior College in 1955 and went on to serve in the United States Air Force from 1955 to 1959. In the 1960s Morrison worked as a manager for Lucky supermarkets in Los Angeles, California.

Morrison earned his bachelor's degree in English from California State University, Los Angeles in 1971 and a Master of Library Science degree from the University of Illinois at Urbana–Champaign in 1972. He also studied at the John F. Kennedy School of Government at Harvard University, completing those studies in 1989.

== Work in libraries ==
Morrison began the Frostproof Living Learning Library Center, an experimental project in Frostproof, Florida funded by the Library Services and Construction Act providing library services to migrant workers. He directed the library from 1972 to 1974.

Morrison was hired by the newly formed Broward County Library system as the assistant to the director in August 1974 and became deputy director in 1976, working in that role for eleven years.

In May 1987 Morrison was appointed by Chicago mayor Harold Washington to oversee construction of the Chicago Public Library central branch. For the next three years he served as Deputy Commissioner/Chief Librarian, supervising library staff while working with the city and its consultants and serving as the library board's liaison with contractors building the new library, which would become the Harold Washington branch.

In 1990 Morrison returned to the Broward County Library, this time as the director of the library system. During Morrison's years with Broward County Library, the system grew from four branches to thirty-eight branches; the system was named Library Journal's "Library of the Year" in 1996.

Inspired by a visit to the Auburn Avenue Research Library on African American Culture and History in Atlanta, Morrison began promoting and fundraising for the creation of the Broward County Library's African-American Research Library and Cultural Center. The 60,000 square-foot AARLCC opened in Fort Lauderdale in 2002 and became not only a research library, but an education and community center as well as a gathering place for celebrations of African American history and culture.

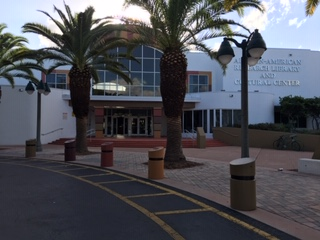
_{African American Research Library and Cultural Center, Fort Lauderdale, Florida}

Morrison retired from his role as director of the Broward County Library in 2003.

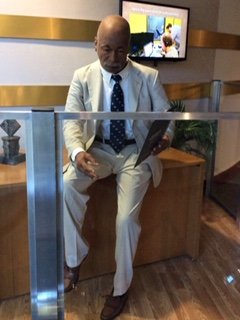
Animatronic of Samuel F. Morrison at African American Research Library and Cultural Center, Fort Lauderdale, Florida

== Awards and leadership ==
Morrison was elected president of the Florida Library Association 1981 and served on the association's executive board. His conference theme was "Florida Libraries: Resource for the Future".

The DEMCO/Black Caucus of the American Library Association Award For Excellence in Librarianship was awarded to Morrison in 1997 for the promotion of African Americans in librarianship.

In 2003, Morrison was recognized with the American Library Association Honorary Membership, its highest honor. He was nominated "for his long and distinguished career in librarianship, his tireless and unflagging promotion of library services, his vision in establishing landmark partnerships between libraries and other community organizations, and his commitment to developing the next generation of librarians as a mentor and supporter of library education."

Other notable awards include the National Urban League's Diversity Champion Award (1998), the NAACP President's Award (1998), the University of Illinois Graduate School of Library and Information Science Distinguished Alumnus Award (1999), and the Florida Library Association Lifetime Achievement Award (2018).

An animatronic version of Morrison resides at the African-American Research Library and Cultural Center in recognition of his many contributions to the culture of Broward County. The animatronic gives a selection of phrases in Morrison's voice, one of which says "I see the African-American Research Library and Cultural Center as a bridge and a beacon. It is a symbol of hope, a span across cultures and a shining light for a world in which knowledge is the true power."
