= North Greenwood =

North Greenwood is a historically African-American neighborhood in Clearwater, Florida. Home to the North Greenwood Library, former North Greenwood Cemetery, churches, a community center, and an African American history museum in a former school building (Curtis School), the area was once home to orange groves. Jack Russell Stadium where the Philadelphia Phillies held Spring training was established on city property. Pinellas Institute served black students.

North Greenwood Cemetery was rediscovered and partially excavated. A historical marker commemorates its history.

North Clearwater Performing Arts Academy home to the Dundu Dole Urban Ballet was established in North Greenwood.

The video Da Hood Gone Wild contrasting the nearby beaches with fights and drug activity in the neighborhood. Marches were held. The Blue Chip Bar was razed by the city. The recreation center and library were built. Buccaneer Field was built and anti-drug and anti-violence campaigns launched. 10News reported on the video and reactions to it.

North Greenwood Recreation & Aquatic Complex includes a playground, gym, pool, and fitness center.

In 2023 the Tampa Bay Times reported on a rejuvenation and redevelopment plan for the "struggling" 6,200 resident neighborhood. The Times described the area as a having been "a vibrant hub of Black entrepreneurship in the city." The proposal would establish a Community Redevelopment Agency in the area.

O'Neal Larkin has been involved in community revitalization efforts and hosts an annual Thanksgiving meal and celebration.

Clearwater Heights was another African American community in Clearwater.

== See also ==
- Joseph W. Hatchett
