= Before Women Had Wings =

1997 American television film

- UK DVD cover
- Genre: Drama
- Based on: Before Women Had Wings by Connie May Fowler
- Written by: Connie May Fowler
- Directed by: Lloyd Kramer
- Presented by: Oprah Winfrey
- Starring: Ellen Barkin; Oprah Winfrey; Tina Majorino; Julia Stiles; Burt Young; John Savage
- Music by: Anton Sanko
- Country of origin: United States
- Original language: English

Production
- Executive producer: Kate Forte
- Producer: Jay Benson
- Cinematography: Ericson Core
- Editor: Stephen Semel
- Running time: 96 minutes
- Production company: Harpo Films

Original release
- Network: ABC
- Release: November 2, 1997

Before Women Had Wings is a 1997 American drama television film directed by Lloyd Kramer and written by Connie May Fowler, based on her 1996 semi-autobiographical novel. It stars Ellen Barkin, Oprah Winfrey, Tina Majorino, Julia Stiles, Burt Young, and John Savage. In the film, set in 1960s Tampa, Florida, a woman whose abusive husband had committed suicide begins violently abusing her two daughters. It is only then that a kindly woman becomes good friends with her youngest daughter and helps the daughter escape her tortured life.

The film was shot in Ojai, California. It was produced by Winfrey's Harpo Films for ABC as the first entry of the "Oprah Winfrey Presents" series, and is the only film in the series in which Winfrey stars. It premiered on ABC on November 2, 1997. Barkin won a Primetime Emmy Award and a Satellite Award for her performance.

== Plot ==
In the 1960s, 9-year-old Avocet Abigale "Bird" Jackson lives with her family in a Florida citrus grove. Life is hard for Bird and her teenage sister Phoebe, constantly putting up with their parents' arguments. Their father, Billy, is always beating their mother, Glory Marie, and every time things seem to go right between Glory Marie and Billy, yet another argument begins. Unable to put up with it any longer, Glory Marie tells Billy she's taking the girls and leaving him. He punches her and knocks her teeth out, then drives off in the car. Later that evening, a policeman shows up at the door to tell them that Billy has killed himself.

Set on starting a new life, Glory Marie takes her daughters and moves to a motel in Tampa, where she gets a job as a bookkeeper in the motel office run by Louis Ippolito. They move into an old trailer because there are no rooms. Bird becomes friends with a kind woman, Zora Williams, whom Glory Marie warns her to stay away from. Glory Marie begins to drink heavily, and beats Phoebe with a brush for staying out late with Louis' son L.J. She later hits Bird on the head with a mug for asking for a bike for Christmas. Glory Marie's estranged son, Hank, comes to visit for Christmas, as he left home because of his parents and there is still some friction between them. Bird spends more and more time with Zora, behind Glory Marie's back, and realizes there can be a better life for her. Phoebe finally stands up to Glory Marie; when she calls Phoebe a tramp for the way she's dressed and slaps her, Phoebe slaps her back.

When Glory Marie discovers that Bird has been visiting Zora, she violently beats her with a belt and leaves. Phoebe takes her to Zora. When Glory Marie returns the next morning, she barges into Zora's and demands her daughters come back with her, but Zora has a word with her and tells her she understands. When her husband died, she ignored her daughter, but she never hit her, and she is going to see her daughter again, but she is not going anywhere until she knows Glory Marie's daughters are safe. Glory Marie makes the hardest decision of her life when she decides to send her daughters away with Zora. On their last day together, Glory Marie makes them dinner, washes, folds and packs all their clothes, and she brushes Bird's hair, with the same brush she used to beat Phoebe. When the girls leave with Zora, Bird is unsure if she will ever see her mother again.

== Cast ==
- Ellen Barkin as Glory Marie Jackson
- Oprah Winfrey as Zora Williams
- Tina Majorino as Avocet Abigale "Bird" Jackson
- Julia Stiles as Phoebe Jackson
- John Savage as Billy Jackson
- Burt Young as Louis Ippolito
- William Lee Scott as Hank Jackson
- Louis Crugnali as L.J. Ippolito
- David Hart as The Sheriff

== Production ==
The film was produced by Oprah Winfrey's company Harpo Films for ABC as the first of the six-entry "Oprah Winfrey Presents" series. It is the only film in the series in which Winfrey stars. Filming took place in Ojai, California.

== Awards and nominations ==
| Year | Award | Category | Nominee(s) | Result | Ref. |
|---|---|---|---|---|---|
| 1998 | Artios Awards | Best Casting for TV Movie of the Week | Francine Maisler | Nominated | |
| 1998 | Golden Globe Awards | Best Actress in a Miniseries or Motion Picture Made for Television | Ellen Barkin | Nominated | |
| 1998 | Primetime Emmy Awards | Outstanding Lead Actress in a Miniseries or a Movie | Ellen Barkin | Won | |
| 1998 | Satellite Awards | Best Actress in a Supporting Role in a Series, Miniseries or a Motion Picture Made for Television | Ellen Barkin | Won | |
| 1998 | Young Artist Awards | Best Performance in a TV Movie/Pilot/Mini-Series: Supporting Young Actress | Tina Majorino | Nominated | |
| 1998 | YoungStar Awards | Best Young Actress in a Mini-Series/Made for TV Film | Tina Majorino | Nominated | |
