= North Greenwood Library =

Coordinates: 27.975102°N 82.791396°W

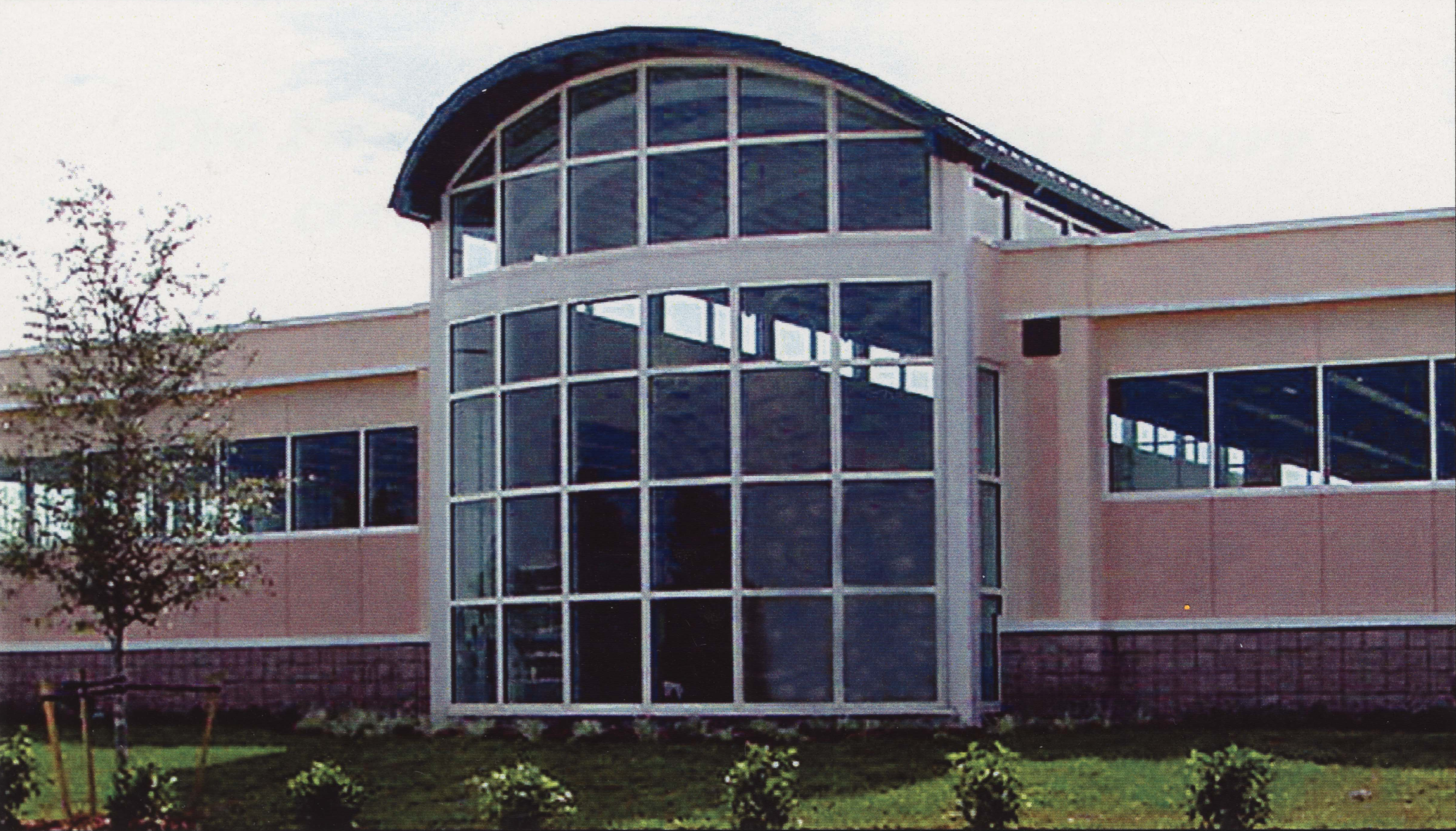
Rear view of North Greenwood Library

The North Greenwood Library is a public library in the North Greenwood neighborhood of Clearwater, Florida. It is part of the Clearwater Library System which, in turn, is part of the Pinellas Public Library Cooperative. Located at 905 N Martin Luther King Jr. Ave, its current Branch Manager is Christa Smith.

== Services ==
The North Greenwood Library's patrons can check out a variety of materials including books, magazines, DVDs, Blu-rays, video games, and a ukulele kit. There is a computer lab with free internet access and free Wi-Fi throughout the library. For non library members, there are two 15 minute express computers. The library offers paid copy and scanning services. It does not have a fax machine. The library has one community room that is used for programs and can be reserved through the online calendar. The newly renovated children's area has Lego tables and coloring areas as well as coloring materials. There is a high definition television that kids can use to watch G or PG rated DVDs and Blu-rays with librarian permission. Also with librarian permission, children are allowed to use a video game console to play video games using the television. All books are free to be read inside the library without needing to be checked out. With a library card issued from North Greenwood and other Clearwater Libraries, patrons have access to online applications and materials such as Libby (service), Pronunciator, Zinio, 3M, and Hoopla.

== History ==
During the 1940s, the black community felt that they should have a library for their children and the future generations. In 1949, Horace Carson, a Clearwater resident and African-American civic leader, initiated a project to convince the City Commission to bring a library to the community. The City Commission agreed to fund a library as long as the community found a building and librarian willing to work there. The library, simply referred to as the "Negro Library", first opened on March 15, 1950 on the corner of Pennsylvania and Cedar Street in a rented building space. Christine Wigfall Morris was the librarian who first opened the doors of the library and was the first black Librarian to work in Clearwater, Fl.

The library, loved by both the community and "Miss Chris", outgrew its rented space so a building was officially built for the collection on Palmetto street. The new building, named the Northeast Library and designed by Eugene Beach, was meant to be run by a single librarian— Christine Morris. It opened in September, 1962 with a collection of 15,000 books. Christine Morris worked tirelessly to keep the library open acting as not only a librarian, but also janitor and community counselor. It was not until 1983, after Morris' retirement, that the library received its current name of North Greenwood Library.

In 1970 the "Edward Allen Henry Jr. Special Collection on Negro Culture and History" was added to the library. In 2002 the special collection's name was changed to "The Christine Wigfall Morris African American Collection" in honor of her decades of work and dedication to the library and the community. In an interview, Christine Morris commented that the community believed the whole library should be named in her honor but the city said she would have to be deceased in order for it to be allowed. She preferred to be alive and see the collection named after herself than to be dead and not see the whole building named.

North Greenwood's current location at the corner of N. Martin Luther King Jr. Ave and Palmetto St was built in 2002. Its grand opening was January 18, 2003.

2009 proved to be a worrisome year for North Greenwood Library, as well as East Library, as budget cuts threatened to close the facility and move the collection to a space inside the North Greenwood Recreation center. In protest of closing the library, the NAACP and local ministers staged marches to save the library. After two months of debate, protests, and voting, it was decided that taxes would be raised and the libraries would stay open but with reduced hours. While many people disagreed with the tax increase, one counsel member remarked how surprised she was that so many of her constituents were willing to accept the tax increase if it meant the libraries stayed open.
