= Susan Dart Butler =

American librarian

- Photo of Susan Dart Butler
- Born: 1888; Charleston, South Carolina
- Died: June 24, 1959 (aged 70–71)
- Occupation: Librarian

Susan Dart Butler (1888 – June 24, 1959) was an American librarian and milliner.

== Early life and education ==
Susan Dart was born in Charleston, South Carolina in 1888 as the oldest child of Reverend John Lewis Dart (1854–1915) and Julia Pierre. She was named after her grandmother, Susan Fenwick, who prior to the Civil War was able to purchase her husband as a free person of color. Reverend Dart, a Baptist, was born free and attended Newton Theological Seminary. Butler attended a private school in 1895, but due to overcrowding, her father established the Charleston Normal and Industrial Institute known locally as Dart Hall, which was located on their property able to serve 150 African American schoolchildren.

Butler attended Atlanta University and later lived in Boston to attend the McDowell Millinery School from 1908 to 1912. In 1912, she married Nathaniel Lowe Butler, a building contractor and real estate agent, and the couple relocated to Charleston where she was a milliner until 1918. In 1918, she gave birth to her only child, Nathaniel Lowe Butler, Jr. She co-founded the Charleston Federation of Women's Clubs, helping improve community life for South Carolina youth.

== Career ==
In 1917, Butler became the treasurer and highest-ranking member of the Charleston branch in the NAACP. One of the campaigns of the newly established branch was for Black teachers to teach Black youth in the schools and in 1920, the school district began to employ African American teachers. In 1918, she ended her millinery business and returned to Reverend Dart's school to reestablish the kindergarten program after his death.

As a member of the Charleston Interracial Committee, Butler and other prominent women within the community, including her mother Julia and Clelia McGowan the city's first alderwoman, turned their attention to convincing residents of Charleston of the need for a library. McGowan began to distribute traveling libraries throughout South Carolina. Butler happened to see a young student request a poetry book that her school didn't have from Dart Hall and recognized chaired a subcommittee to survey the quality and condition of books found in local black schools, churches and civic organizations. The survey found that many books were in poor condition.

In 1927, Butler opened a reading room three days a week for African Americans at Dart Hall. The room was previously used for printing the newspaper Southern Reporter from 1905 to 1913 and the damage to the floor prompted Butler to replace the floorboards. She used books from her father's collection, operating the room at her expense. The Charleston Free Library was founded in 1929 with financing from the Rosenwald Fund and the Carnegie Fund. The library received much of the funding because of Dart Hall because the funds were looking to finance libraries for Black patrons. The library consisted of two branches, one for White patrons and the other, Dart Hall, for Black patrons. White patrons were able to use the temporary location until the library was completed but Black patrons needed to wait until July 1931 when Charleston Free Library adopted Dart Hall as a branch. The Dart family rented it to Charleston County for $1 a year until 1952 when the County purchased it as a branch.

The branch was staffed by three African American librarians and 3,600 books were in circulation. Helen Virginia Stelle oversaw the creation of the new library. While the majority of white librarians employed weren't trained as librarians, Stelle was particularly critical of Dart Hall librarians in her review wrote that Dart Hall was in terrible condition and the head librarian, Julia Macbeth, was incompetent. Stelle though Butler would be competent as a librarian but technical work would be too complicated. Stelle proposed Butler attend Hampton Institute, Hampton, Virginia with pay for training in library science to complement her previously informal training at Dart Hall Library and traveling throughout the South to see how various libraries were organized. Butler became head librarian in 1932 upon her return. Stelle also recommended that circulating children's books be very simple since elementary county students were perceived as having limited reading skills and often rejected requests for challenging adult material as well. Butler actively contested these ideas telling children to "pick something harder" and receiving financial assistance from outside sources to purchased more intellectual materials and the acquisition of secondhand books. Butler also worked with the librarians to create programs for children and adults to encourage reading and use of the library which resulted in an increase of patronage.

In May 1957, Susan Dart Butler retired from the library. She died June 24, 1959.
