= Register, Georgia =

- Town
- Location in Bulloch County and the state of Georgia
- Coordinates: 32°21′59″N 81°53′1″W
- Country: United States
- State: Georgia
- County: Bulloch

Area
  - Total: 0.78 sq mi (2.03 km^{2})
  - Land: 0.78 sq mi (2.02 km^{2})
  - Water: 0.0077 sq mi (0.02 km^{2})
- Elevation: 194 ft (59 m)

Population (2020)
  - Total: 157
  - Density: 201.7/sq mi (77.89/km^{2})
- Time zone: UTC-5 (Eastern (EST))
  - Summer (DST): UTC-4 (EDT)
- ZIP code: 30452
- Area code: 912
- FIPS code: 13-64372
- GNIS feature ID: 0332824

Register is a town in Bulloch County, Georgia, United States. The population was 157 in 2020. The community was named after Frank Register, a pioneer citizen.

== Geography ==
Register is located at 32°21′59″N 81°53′1″W (32.366495, -81.883543). According to the United States Census Bureau, the town has a total area of 0.8 square miles (2.1 km^{2}), all land.

== Demographics ==
Historical population
Census	Pop.	Note	%±
1990	195		—
2000	164		−15.9%
2010	175		6.7%
2020	157		−10.3%
U.S. Decennial Census

As of the census of 2000, there were 164 people, 68 households, and 39 families residing in the town. In 2020, its population declined to 157.
