= Florida Library Association =

Professional association for librarians in Florida

- Nickname: FLA
- Formation: 1920; 106 years ago
- Tax ID no.: 59-1159907
- Headquarters: Tallahassee, FL
- Leader: Jennifer Abdelnour, Executive Director
- Parent organization: American Library Association
- Website: www.flalib.org

The Florida Library Association (FLA) is a regional, non-profit organization that promotes professional discourse and opportunities for the library community in Florida. The FLA publishes the Florida Libraries Journal.

== History ==
The Florida Library Association began meeting in 1906, but it was officially formed in 1920 by Helen Virginia Stelle, director of the Tampa Public Library. In addition to its publication, Florida Libraries, the FLA provides a forum for issues and advocacy.

Prior to any formal organization, the first state-wide assembly of Florida librarians took place in December 1906 in St. Augustine. On April 26 and 27, 1920, the Florida Library Association was officially established.

The institution started out with 23 charter members whose primary goal was to embolden the state government, to establish a state library agency, and to endorse legislation that allowed for counties to establish their own libraries within their own communities. They were successful in their efforts, and in 1925 the state library was established. In 1931 a county library law was sanctioned. The first chairman and then-president of the Florida Library Association was Helen Virginia Stelle.

Each year since 1920, with the exception of 1943-1945 (due to WWII), the conference has taken place in various libraries throughout the state. This federation and assembly of Florida librarians have brought about progress in discourse, activism, and forward-thinking adaptations to the way libraries function throughout the state. Themes which over its history have informed the FLA assembly, its mission, and its activism include “The Enlightened South” in 1966, “Threshold of a New Decade” in 1969, libraries as a “Renewable Resource” in 1986, and “Diverse Libraries to Serve Floridians” in 2000.

The 1935 Florida Library Survey statement demonstrates the FLA's commitment to its mission by indicating that the organization “must take the lead to inform citizens of the desirability of library service to meet their practical and cultural needs.”

== List of presidents ==
Year	President
2026	Marina Morgan
2025	Allison Grubbs
2024	Jorge Perez
2023	Douglas Crane
2022	Shane Roopnarine
2021	Phyllis Gorshe
2020	Laura Spears
2019	Eric Head
2018	Sarah J. Hammill
2017	Elana Karshmer
2016	Gene Coppola
2015	Linda McCarthy
2014	Gladys Roberts
2013	Barbara J. Stites
2012	Gloria Colvin
2011	John Callahan
2010	Wendy Breeden
2009	Mercedes Clement
2008	Charlie Parker
2007	Sol Hirsch
2006	Nancy Pike
2005	Derrie Perez
2004	John Szabo
2003	Marta Westall
2002	Betty Johnson
2001	Mary Brown
2000	Madison Mosley
1999	Mary Jane Little
1998	Patricia DeSalvo
1997	Eileen Cobb
1996	Elizabeth Curry
1995	Helen Moeller
1994	Susan Anderson
1993	Ann Williams
1992	Alphonse F. Trezza
1991	Linda O'Connor-Levy
1990	Thomas Reitz
1989	Althea Jenkins
1988	John D. Hales
1987	Lydia Acosta
1986	James Wheeler
1985	John McCrossan
1984	Jean Rhein
1983	Harold Goldstein
1982	Ada Seltzer
1981	Samuel F. Morrison
1979-1980	Bernadette Storck
1979	John DePew
1978	Glenn Miller
1977	Eloise Harbeson
1976	Ed Sintz
1975	Virginia Grazier
1974	Dennis Robison
1973	David Kantor
1972	Leo Meirose
1971	Lynn Walker
1970	Cecil Beach
1969	DeLyle Runge
1968	Verna Nistendirk
1967	Elizabeth B. Mann
1966	Margaret Chapman
1965	Harry Brinton
1964	Thomas Dreier
1963	Ruth Rockwood
1962	Betty S. Lunnon
1961	Elliott Hardaway
1960	Frank B. Sessa
1959	Archie L. McNeal
1958	Helen L. Keepfe
1957	Dorothy Dodd
1956	Elizabeth Peeler
1955	William Frieze
1954	Dr. Louis Shores
1953	Alice Pearce
1952	Paul A.T. Noon
1951	Clara E. Wendel
1950	Stanley L. West
1949	Sara Malcolm Krentzman
1948	Betty W. Service
1947	Ida Kelley Cresap
1945-1946	Eulah Mae Snider
1943-1944	Wesley Summers
1942	Bertha Aldrich
1941	Olive Brumbaugh
1940	R.W. Severance
1939	Henrie Mae Eddy
1937-1938	Mary Bright
1936	Carl Bohnenberger
1934-1935	William F. Yust
1932-1933	Louise Richardson
1931	Helen V. Stelle
1929-1930	Joseph F. Marron
1928	Olive Brumbaugh
1926-1927	Anne VanNess Brown
1924-1925	Cora Miltimore
1923	Louise Gamsby
1922	Helen V. Stelle
1921	Joseph F. Marron
1920	Helen V. Stelle (Convener)
1907-1910	George Burwell Utley
1905-1906	Carolyn Palmer

== Advocacy ==
The FLA addresses important and impactful issues that affect Florida's libraries and intellectual freedom. Its Statement on Professional Education states that Librarians and Library Directors must have a master's degree in Library and Information Sciences or Studies to uphold professional standards. The Statement on Privatization of Publicly-Supported Libraries advocates that efforts to privatize libraries by for-profit organizations should be opposed.

The FLA organizes an annual Library Legislative Day during which librarians, library advocates, and other supporters meet both virtually and in person at the Florida State Capitol in Tallahassee to speak with legislators in order to raise awareness of library issues.

In 2024 Vice President/President-Elect Jorge Perez flew to Washington, DC to participate in the Chief Officers of State Library Agencies "Voices for Libraries event."

=== Friends of Florida Libraries Honor Roll ===
The Friends of Florida Libraries Honor Roll supports FLA advocacy activities within the state government. Every year, the Friends of Florida Libraries sponsors a Library Day in Tallahassee in order to advocate for funding, library related legislation, and awareness.

== Scholarships ==
The FLA provides multiple scholarships annually for students to enroll in programs of library and information science.

- Study at Florida State University MSLIS graduate program.
- Study at the University of South Florida MLIS graduate program, named for Bernadette Storck, a FLA past-president and archivist.
- Study by a Minority student attending either Florida State University or the University of South Florida.

== Court cases ==
In 2006, the FLA filed an amicus curiae memorandum in the United States District Court in support of an ACLU and Miami-Dade Student Government Association lawsuit. The Miami-Dade County School Board removed the book Vamos a Cuba and "A Visit to..." book series from the Miami-Dade School Board libraries and classrooms. In early 2009, the 11th Circuit Court of Appeals reversed the decision to return the book to the school libraries.

== Censorship issues ==
The FLA supports the Florida Association for Media in Education (FAME) in their opposition to filed Florida legislation HB855 and SB1454, which has been criticized by the National Coalition Against Censorship for weakening First Amendment rights to freedom of speech by "authorizing any Florida resident (even if they have no connection to a particular school or library) to sue for injunctions to remove material they deem controversial and burden school districts with legal fees and court action."

== Public awareness tools ==
The FLA works to show the benefits of Florida's libraries. On their website, the Association promotes several tools and information sources, including Return on Investment information, data to support advocacy messages, Access Studies, and recommended readings.

== Archives ==
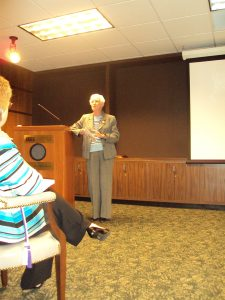
Bernadette E. Storck- Florida Library Association Past President and Archivist

The Florida Library Association records are available for research at the University of South Florida Libraries Tampa Special Collections. The collection consists of 144 boxes of historical research material and institutional records, ranging from 1905 to 2015. Included in the repository are meeting minutes, treasurer's reports, conference programs, planning material, newspaper clippings, photographs, committee records, and other associated subject files. They were organized by Bernadette E. Storck, 1979-1980 FLA president. The collection is available to affiliated University of South Florida researchers and the general public.

The "Florida Library History Project" organized by FLA members is also available at the University of South Florida, Tampa Library, Special Collections.

== See also ==
- List of libraries in the United States
