= Broward County Library =

Public library system in Florida

Broward County Library System
- Location: Broward County, Florida, United States
- Type: Public library system
- Established: 1974
- Branches: 38

Collection
- Size: 3 million items

Access and use
- Circulation: 10.5 million
- Population served: 1,909,632

Other information
- Director: Allison Grubbs
- Website: broward.org/library

The Broward County Library is a public library system in Broward County, Florida, in the United States. The system contains 37 branch locations and circulates over 9 million items annually. The system includes the Main Library in Fort Lauderdale, five regional libraries, and various branches. According to the Broward County Library’s 2024 Annual Report, library programs saw a 20% increase in attendance, serving more than 340,000 people. Total circulation of books exceeded 8.5 million, also reflecting a 20% year-over-year increase.

== History ==
From 1963 to 1972, activists established a library subcommittee to improve library service in Broward County. The report generated by the committee received wide media attention and was supported by County Commissioner Robert Hubener. On January 9, 1973, the Broward County Commission approved the establishment of a library system.

In 1974, the Broward County Libraries, also called the Libraries Division, was officially established, bringing four existing municipal libraries together to establish the system comprising the Fort Lauderdale Library and its three branch libraries of Fort Lauderdale, Riverland, and Mizel, as well as the Hollywood Library, all with a budget of about $1.3 million. The system began issuing borrower cards on June 17, 1974, for 270,000 items.

By 1978, a bond issue approved and provided funding for the system's expansion, allowing for the addition of thirteen further branches, all joining over the course of the 1980s. The last of the 1978 bond issue libraries built was the Imperial Point Library, opening in April 1988. Over the following three decades, many of the municipalities in Broward County elected to join the library system. These included Coral Springs, Lauderhill, Hallandale, Dania Beach, Margate, Sunrise, Deerfield Beach, North Lauderdale, and Pompano Beach.

In 1980, the construction of the Main Library was funded. Library-system director Cecil Beach was involved in all phases of the Main Library project, from planning to completion. On April 29, 1984, the Main Library opened and became one of two flagship libraries in the system. The Main library was designed by Robert F. Gatje of Marcel Breuer Associates. The building was constructed as an eight-story structure with a six-story atrium, a 300-seat auditorium, and a special collections area hosting the Bines Museum of the Modern Book. When it opened, the Main Library also immediately functioned as a full-service research library, in addition to hosting the Broward Community Technology Center, a Talking Books library, the NationsBank Small Business Resource Center, and the Florida Diagnostic and Learning Resources System media Center.

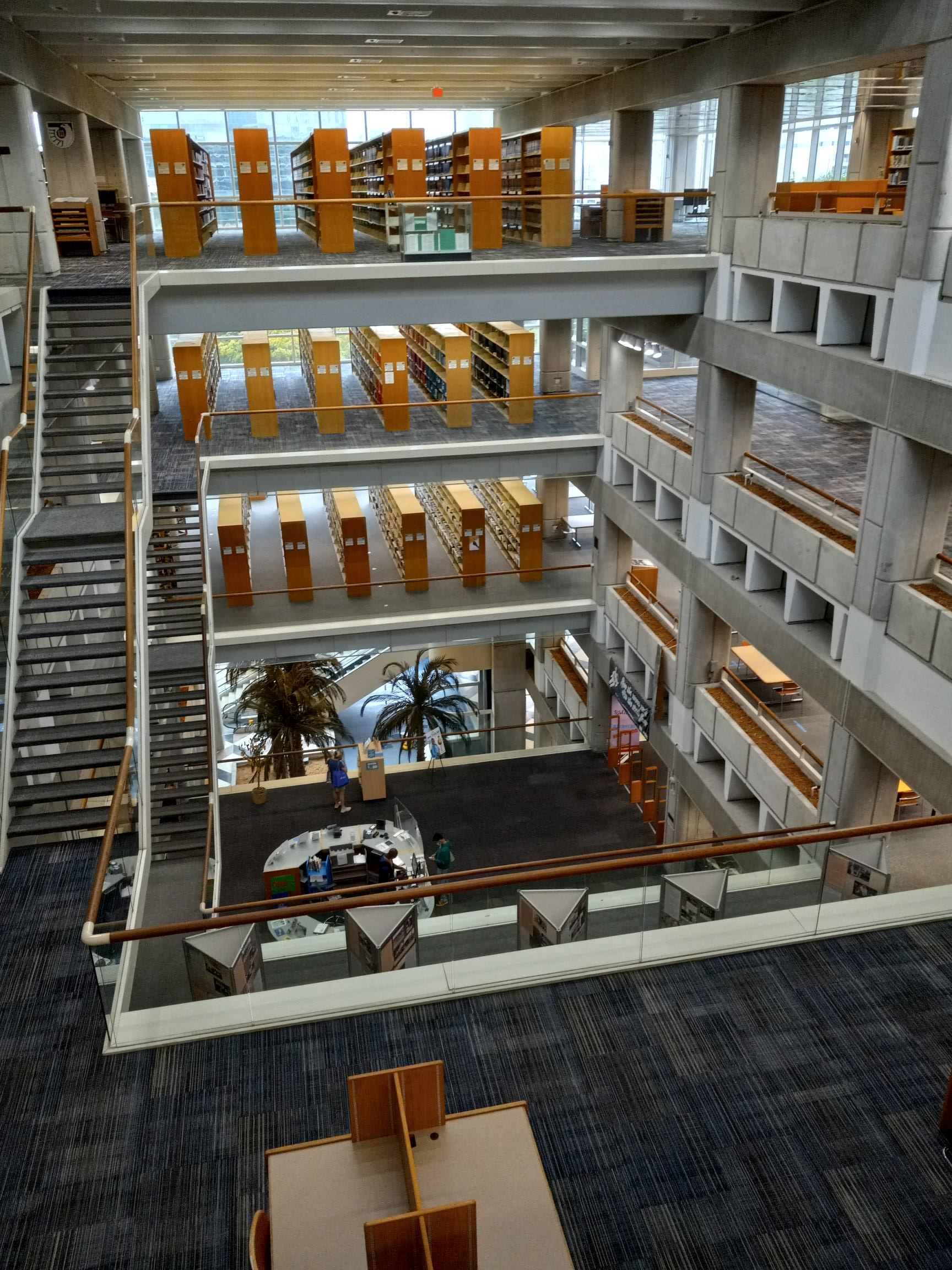
Broward County Main Library interior view

In 1983, the South Regional Library located on the South Campus of Broward Community College became the first joint-use public-college library in the State of Florida.

The library system was named "Library of the Year" in 1996 by Library Journal and Gale Research. That same year, the Bienes Museum of the Modern Book, then called the Bienes Center for the Literary Arts, opened as Broward County Library's rare book archive. By 1998, the Broward County Library was the ninth largest library system in the United States, employing over 700 part-time and full-time employees with at least 200 being professional librarians, as well as engaging over 2,000 volunteers to assist with library operations across the county. The system expanded further after a 1999 bond issue succeeded in approving further funding to expand the system to include a total of 37 library branches, alongside acquiring new technology for patron use.

The second of Broward County Libraries' two flagship libraries, the African American Research Library and Cultural center, opened on October 26, 2002.

Kelvin Watson was appointed as library-system director in 2017. Upon his resignation Allison Grubbs was named director in 2021.

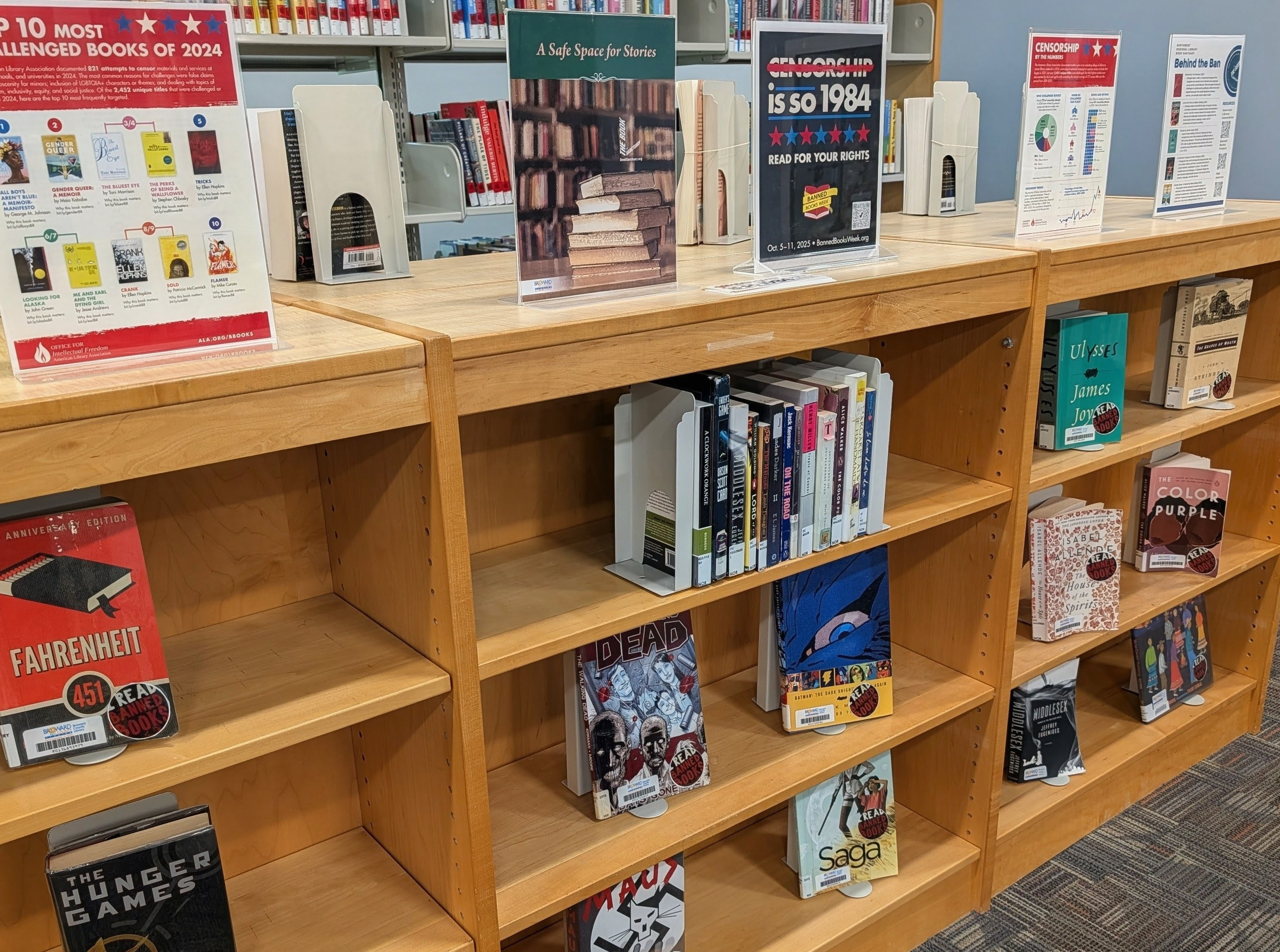
Book Sanctuary at the Northwest Regional Library.

January 2018 saw Broward County Libraries host their first chalk art festival, at the time called “Chalk Lit,” at the Main Library. In later years the festival’s name was changed to “Art Lit” and the host library and theme for the festival change every year.

In October 2022, the Broward County Library ceased charging late fines to patrons in addition to past fines.

In November 2023, the Broward County Library opened up Book Sanctuaries all throughout their library branches. This allows patrons access to books that have been challenged or restricted.

== Awards and recognition ==
The library has been recognized by the Florida Library Association for its partnership with the Florida Panthers Foundation, and by the National Association of County Information Officers for photography, video, website content, and public engagement campaigns. The National Association of Counties has acknowledged Broward County Library’s non-resident e-card program and its “Peace Love Libraries” 50th Anniversary celebration.

In 2025, the Southeast Florida Library Information Network (SEFLIN) honored former library director Samuel Morrison with its Library of the Year Lifetime Achievement Award. Broward County Library also received multiple MarCom Awards, including Platinum for its Freegal Quest campaign and several Gold awards for its 50th Anniversary campaign, Broward County Library Magazine, promotional photography, and video work. It received honorable mentions for its “I Read Banned Books” initiatives and its Senior and Family Spotlight e-newsletters.

In 2026, the Florida Library Association named Broward County Library Library of the Year, citing the system’s innovation, service quality, and system wide contributions. The same year, the Westside Gazette received the association’s Media Partner Award for its collaboration with the library, while the African American Research Library and Cultural Center’s Saturday School program earned the Intellectual Freedom Award. The library also received an FLA Communications Award for its “Freegal Wizard” digital resources campaign.

== Branches ==
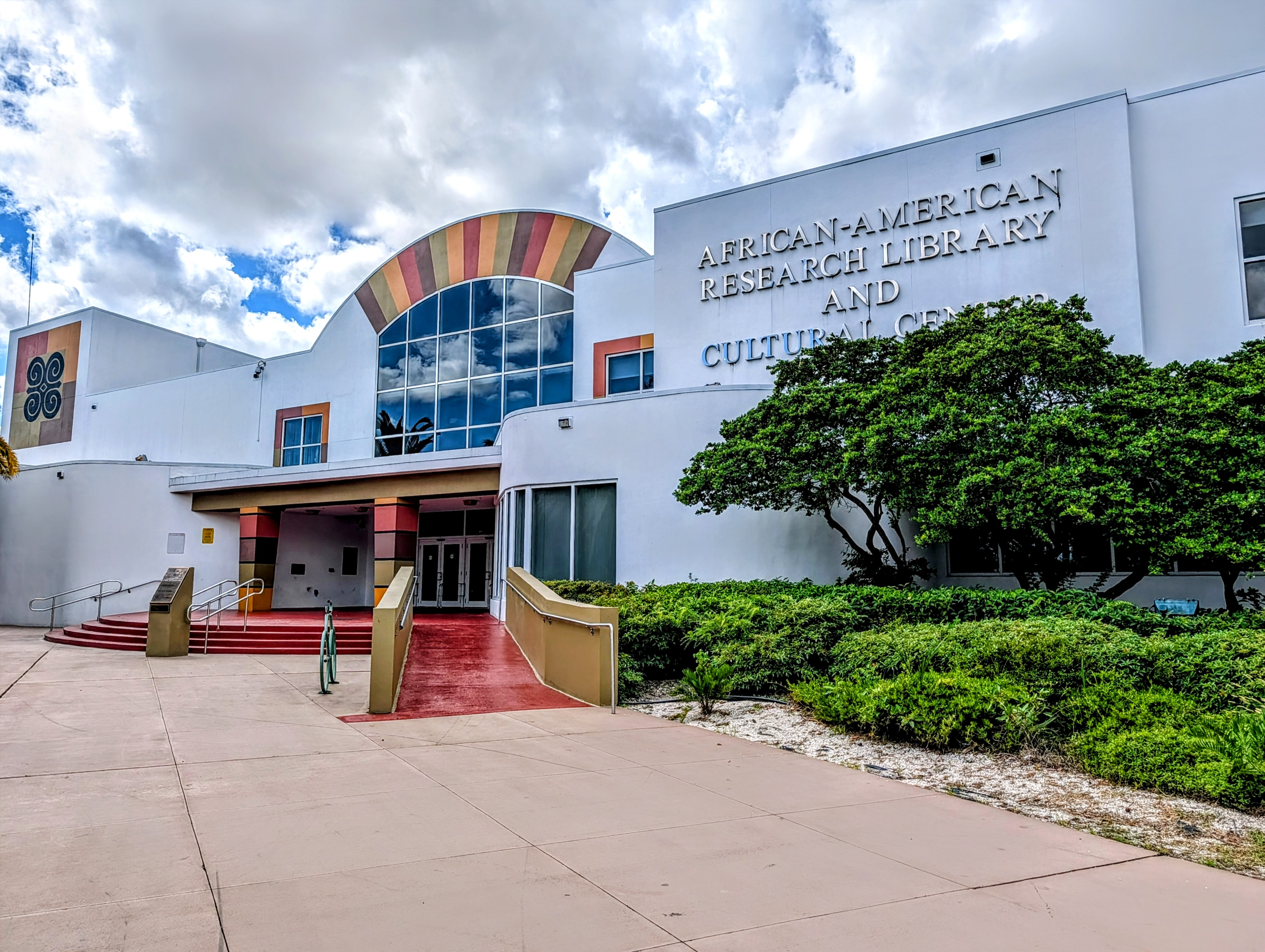
African American Research and Cultural Center in Fort Lauderdale, Florida.

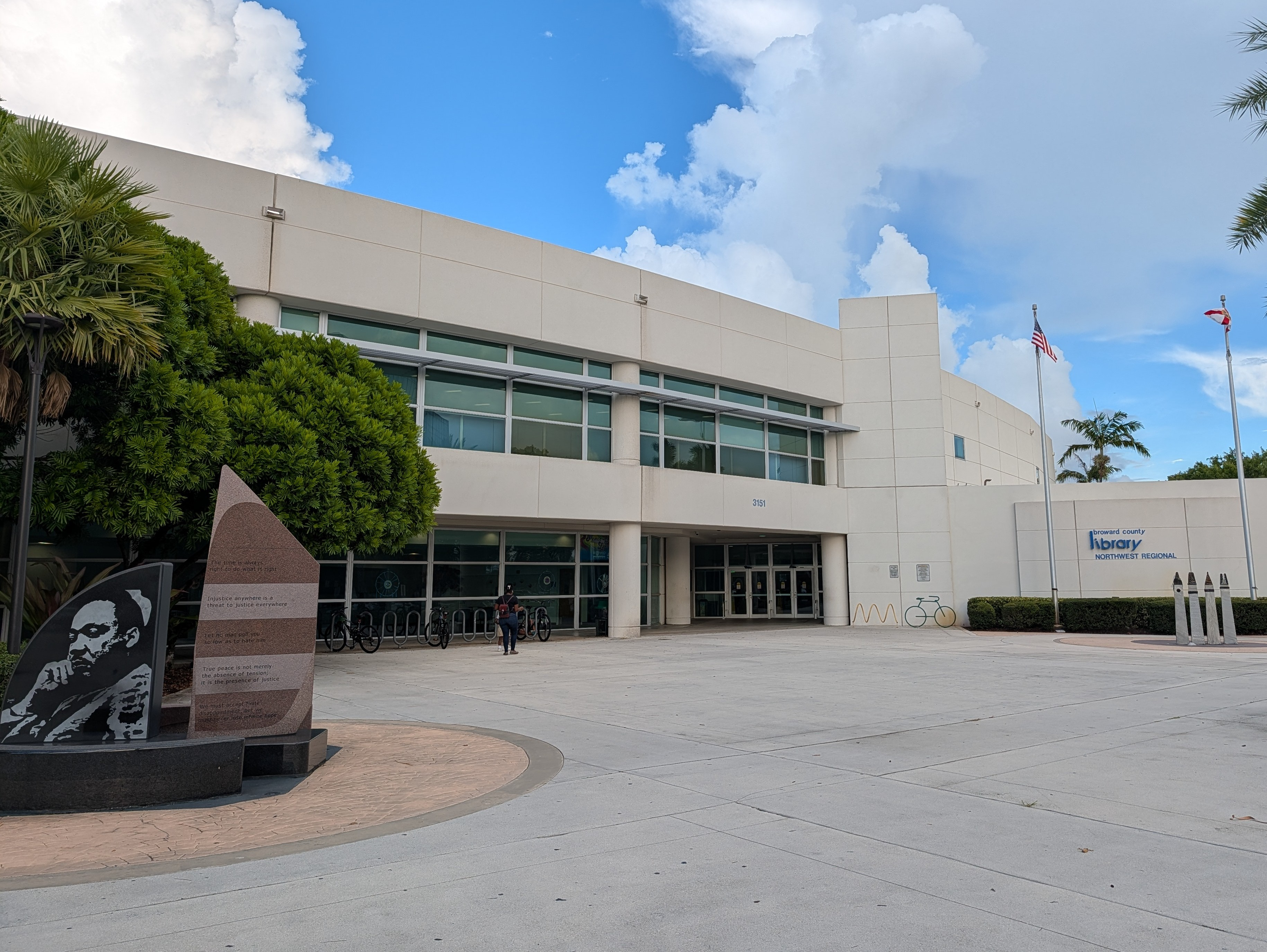
Northwest Regional Library in Coral Springs, Florida.

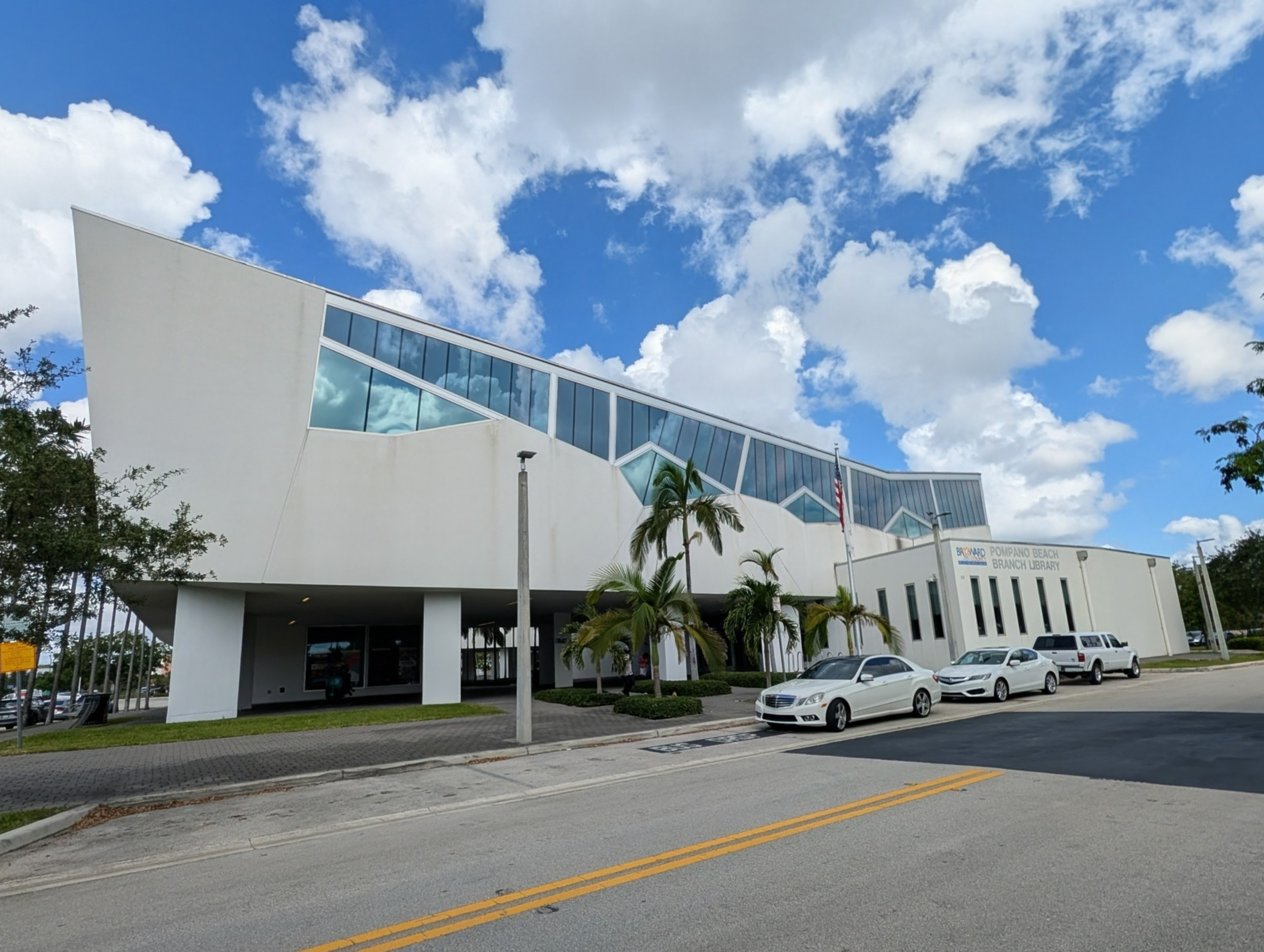
Pompano Beach Library and Cultural Center in Pompano Beach, Florida.

The library system has 37 branches located throughout the county:

- African American Research Library & Cultural Center | AF
- Beach Branch | BE
- Broward County Law Library
- Carver Ranches Branch | CR
- Century Plaza/Leon Slatin Branch | CP
- Dania Beach Paul DeMaio Branch | DA
- Davie/Cooper City Branch | DC
- Deerfield Beach Percy White Branch | DB
- Fort Lauderdale Reading Center | FL
- Galt Ocean Mile Reading Center | GO
- Hallandale Beach Branch | HL
- Hollywood Beach Bernice P. Oster Branch | HB
- Hollywood Branch | HO
- Imperial Point Branch | IP
- Jan Moran Collier City Learning Library | CC
- Lauderdale Lakes Branch Library/Educational and Cultural Center | LL
- Lauderhill Central Park Library | LH
- Lauderhill Towne Centre Library | LC
- Main Library | MN
- Margate Catharine Young Branch | MG
- Miramar Branch Library & Education Center | MI
- North Lauderdale Saraniero Branch | NL
- North Regional/Broward College Library | NR
- Northwest Regional Library | NO
- Nova Southeastern University Alvin Sherman Library Research and Information Technology Center | NV |joint use
- Pembroke Pines/Walter C. Young Resource Center | PE
- Pompano Beach Library and Cultural Center | PO
- Riverland Branch | RV
- South Regional/Broward College Library | SR
- Southwest Regional Library | SW
- Stirling Road Branch | SL
- Sunrise Dan Pearl Branch | SN
- Tamarac Branch | TA
- Tyrone Bryant Branch | BR
- West Regional Library | WR
- Weston Branch | WE
- Young at Art | YB

== African-American Research Library and Cultural Center ==
On October 26, 2002, the Broward County Library opened the African-American Research Library and Cultural Center in Fort Lauderdale, Florida. Samuel F. Morrison the library director, was inspired to build the library after a visit to the Atlanta–Fulton Public Library System, Auburn Avenue Research Library on African American Culture and History.

The African-American Research Library and Cultural Center is a 60,000 square-foot facility with a 300-seat auditorium, a 5,000-square-foot art gallery, and Small Business Resource Center. Since its opening, the Center has hosted more than 38 major exhibits and served more than 895,000 customers.
