= Oralia Garza de Cortes =

- Occupations: Librarian, advocate, and scholar

Oralia Garza de Cortes is a librarian, advocate, bibliographer, and scholar. She has been honored by REFORMA with the Lifetime Achievement Award which recognizes excellence in librarianship over a career for one who has made significant and lasting contributions to Latino and Spanish-speaking communities.

She served as the president of REFORMA from 2000 to 2001. She is also a cofounder with Sandra Rios Balderrama of the Pura Belpré Award, named after New York Public Library's first Latina librarian, which honors outstanding Latino authors and illustrators who create works for children. She holds a Master's of Library and Information Science from the University of Texas at Austin, obtained in 1988.

== Career ==
She currently works Austin, Texas as a Latino Children's Literature Consultant. She works to ensure equity of access to books, library services, and book publishing. Specifically, Garza de Cortes advocates for Latino children's access and publishing standards for books written by and featuring Latino protagonists and storylines. However, Garza de Cortes works to represent marginalized and disadvantaged children outside of the Latino community as well. She has worked toward providing information access and literacy advocacy for child refugees recently, and spoke about this work at the 2016 ALA annual conference in Orlando, Florida. Garza de Cortes has served on the Caldecott Committee in the year 2000 and the board of directors of Association for Library Service to Children, and was the first Latina in either of those positions.

== Honors, decorations, awards and distinctions ==
- 2012. Advocacy Award from the Joint Conference of Librarians of Color.
- 2013."Women in Library History" by the Feminist Task Force of the American Library Association.
- 2015. Library Journal's Movers and Shakers. Garza de Cortes worked with Lucía Gonzalez and Patrick Sullivan to create a program to provide books and backpacks to children in detention centers working through immigration processes or awaiting deportation.
- 2022. Elizabeth Martinez Lifetime Achievement Award by REFORMA.
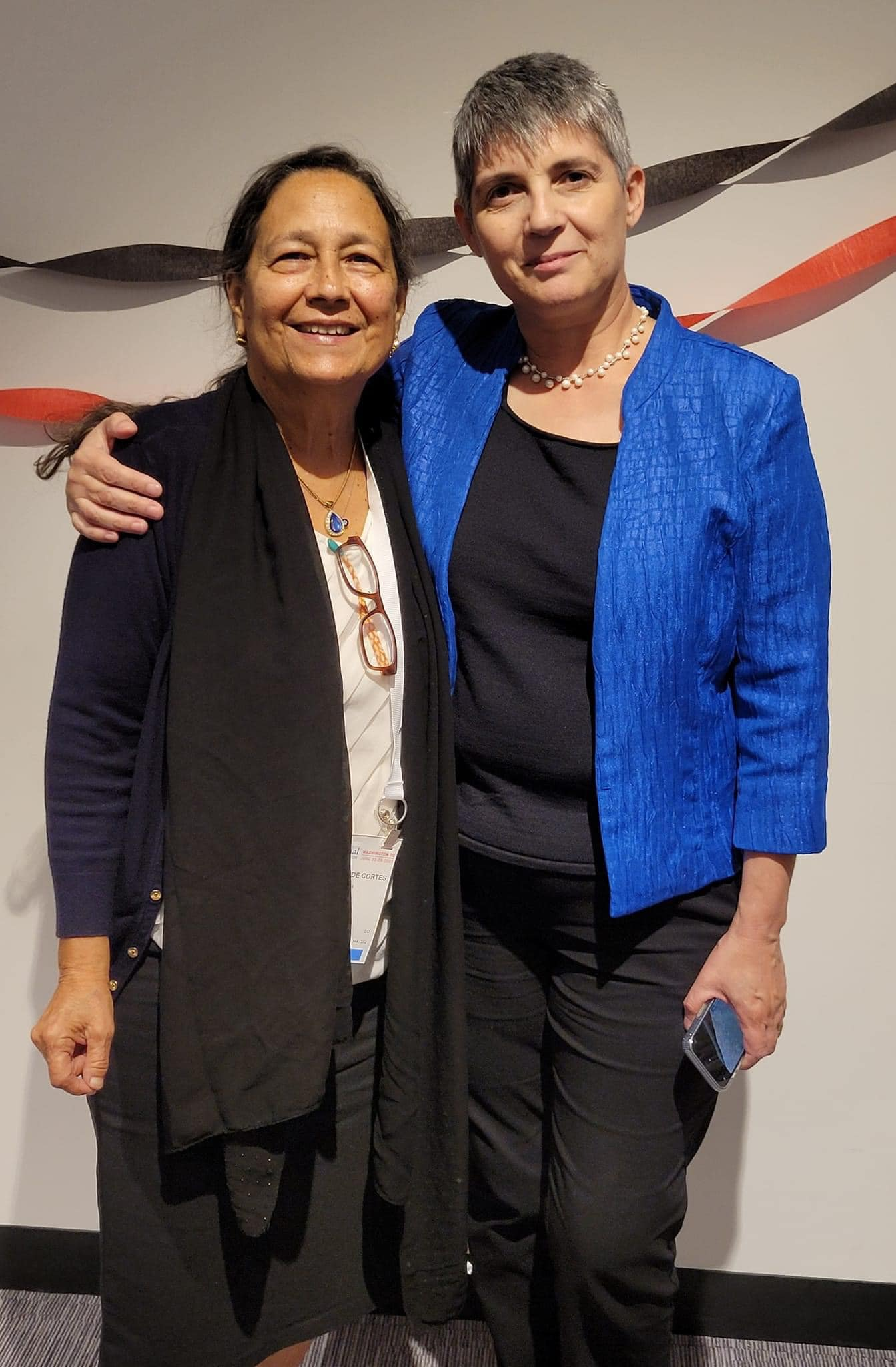
  REFORMA 2022 Award Recipients: Oralia Garza de Cortes, L (Elizabeth Martinez Lifetime Achievement Award) and Alicia K Long, R (Arnulfo Trejo, Librarian of the Year Award.)
- 2024. Association for Library Service to Children (ALSC) Distinguished Service Award.

== Selected works ==
Contributor, "Public Library Services and Latino Children: Getting it right in the Twenty-First Century" in Ayala, John and Sal Guereña, editors. Pathways to Progress: Issues and Advances to Latino Librarianship. Libraries Unlimited, 2011.

Contributor, Celebrating Culture, Reading, & Family Literacy @ the Library with the Latino Reading and Literacy Programs El día de los niños/El día de los libros (Día) and Noche de Cuentos. Paper presented by Jamie Cambell Naidoo at World Library and Information Congress, 76th IFLA International Federation of Library Associations General Conference and Assembly, Gothenburg, 2010.

Desarrollando la cultural de lectores en la comunidad con el programa comunitario El día de los niños/El día de los libros/ Developing a Culture of Reading in the Community through El día de los niños/El día de los libros. Proceedings of the Mexican Library Association, Zacatecas, Mexico, 2010.

Contributor, "Give them what they need: Library Services for Latino Children." In Whole Library Handbook: Current Data, Professional Advise, and Curiosa About Libraries and Library Services. Edited by George M. Eberhart. American Library Association, 2006.

Contributor, "The Pura Belpré Awards: Celebrating Latino Authors and Illustrators." Edited by Rose Zertuche Trevino. Chicago: American Library Association, 2006.

Contributor, "The Power of Language: To Imagine, to Learn, to Act / El Poder del Idioma: Para Imaginar, aprender y actuar" in The Power of Language/El Poder de la Palabra: Selected Papers from the Second REFORMA National Conference. Libraries Unlimited, 2001.

Contributor, "Give them what they need: Library Services for Latino Children" in Library Services for Hispanic Youth. Edited by Kathleen de la Peña McCook and Barbara Immroth, McFarland, 2000.

Contributor, “Behind the Golden Door: The Latino Immigrant Child in Literature and Films for Children. In The New Press Guide to Multicultural Resources for Young Readers. Edited by Dahne Muse. New York: The New Press, 1997.

Co-author, "Mexican American's Children's Literature in the 1990s: Toward Authenticity" in Using Multiethnic Literature in the K-8 Classroom. Edited by Violet J. Harris. Christopher-Gordon Publishers, 1997.
