= Arnulfo Trejo =

American academic (1922–2002)

Arnulfo Duenes Trejo
- Arnulfo Trejo Memorial Photo from REFORMA
- Born: August 15, 1922; Villa Vicente Guerrero, Durango, Mexico
- Died: July 5, 2002 (aged 79); Tucson, Arizona, United States
- Occupations: Professor & Writer
- Spouse(s): Annette M. Foster Trejo (2nd); Ninfa Trejo (3rd)
- Children: 3

Arnulfo Duenes Trejo (August 15, 1922 – July 5, 2002) was a writer and Professor of Library Science at the University of Arizona. He was a leader in the movement to increase library collections of Latino literature and Spanish-language materials in the United States. He was also instrumental in efforts to train more Latino and Spanish-speaking people as professional librarians.

== Biography ==
Trejo was born in Villa Vicente Guerrero, Durango, Mexico.

He moved to the United States at the age of three, gaining American citizenship in 1944 during his service with the U.S. Army during World War II with the 143 Infantry Division in the South Pacific. He was awarded the Purple Heart and the Bronze Star.

He earned a B.A. in Education, University of Arizona, 1949; M.A. in Spanish Language and Literature, University of the Americas, 1951; M.A. in Library Science, Kent State University, 1953; Litt.D. (with honors), National University of Mexico, 1959.

When he started his position as a Professor of Library Science at the University of Arizona in 1965, Trejo was one of only five Hispanic librarians in the nation.

In 1971 he and Elizabeth Martinez founded the National Association of Spanish Speaking Librarians in the United States, which would later be called REFORMA; it is today a prominent organization for Latino librarians as well as for librarians serving Latino communities. Trejo was inspired to help start REFORMA after a screening of the film I Am Joaquin, based on the epic poem “I Am Joaquin” by Corky Gonzalez, and exploring the struggles and exploitation of Mexican Americans. He served as president of the organization from 1971 to 1974. In recognition of his importance to the organization, REFORMA's Librarian of the Year Award is named after Trejo; it is the Arnulfo D. Trejo Librarian of the Year (LOTY) award.

In 1975 he founded the Graduate Library Institute for Spanish-speaking Americans (GLISA), an American Library Association-accredited master's degree program for training librarians. During the institute's four-year existence Trejo was directly involved in recruiting Latino students into the program and contributed to their education.

In 1980 Trejo cofounded Hispanic Books Distributors, a Spanish language book seller aimed at increasing the availability of Spanish-language materials to libraries in the United States.

== Trejo Foster Foundation for Hispanic Library Education ==
In 1992, Trejo, his sister Luisa Duenes Trejo, and his second wife, Annette M. Foster Trejo, created the Trejo Foster Foundation for Hispanic Library Education (TFF) which has sponsored national institutes for library education to serve the information needs of Latinos. The TFF was formed as a “think-tank” to address issues concerning library and information science education.

- I. Status of Hispanic Library and Information Science; A National Institute for Educational Change. University of Arizona, School of Information Resources and Library Science.Tucson, Arizona. Director, Charlie D. Hurt. July 29–31, 1993.
- II. Latino Populations and the Public Library. University of Texas-Austin. Graduate School of Library and Information Science. Austin, Texas. Director Brooke E. Sheldon. November 12–15, 1995.
- III. Hispanic Leadership in Libraries. Rutgers University, School of Communications, Information, and Library Studies. Co-Directors: Betty J. Turock and Martín Gómez. New Jersey. August 8–10, 1997.
- IV. Library Services to Youth of Hispanic Heritage. University of South Florida, School of Library and Information Science. Director, Kathleen de la Peña McCook.Tampa, Florida. March 12–14, 1999. Dr. Arnulfo Trejo participated introducing Dr. Isabel Schon for the Alice G. Smith Lecture which was held during the Institute.
- V. Bridging Borders: Building Hispanic Library Education and Services in a Global Perspective. University of Wisconsin-Madison, School of Library and Information Studies and University of Wisconsin-Milwaukee, School of Information Studies. Madison, Wisconsin. Co-Directors: Louise S. Robbins and Mohammed M. Aman. July 20–22, 2001.

His third wife Ninfa Trejo (married in 1995), continues the work of the Trejo Foster Foundation as President of the Foundation.

- VI Institute August 15–17. 2003. “Memoria Voz y Patrimonio: The first conference on Latino-Hispanic Film, Print and Sound Archives”

Director: Clara Chu, Graduate School of Education and Information Science, University of California Los Angeles, Los Angeles (UCLA), California.

- VII. The University of Arizona School of Information Resources and Library Science and the Arizona Health Sciences Library seventh biannual Trejo Foster Foundation Institute focusing on issues of health information services for Hispanic constituencies. July 12–14, 2007. The University of Arizona, Tucson, Arizona. Director:Jana Bradley.
- VIII. Institute November 5–6, 2010. “Engaging and Serving Hispanic/Latino and Spanish-speaking Communities: Best Practices, Challenges, and Strategies” Graduate School of Library and Information Science, Simmons College, Boston, Massachusetts. Co-Directors: Howard Rodriguez-Mori and Michèle Cloonan. Co-sponsored by the Simmons College, University of Rhode Island, Southern Connecticut State University, Massachusetts Board of Library Commissioners, New England Library Association and REFORMA National and Northeast Chapter.
- IX "Education & Library Services: Connecting Borders" October 5, 2012 - October 6, 2012. Director: Javier Tarango, Department of Philosophy and Letters of the Chihuahua Autonomous University, Chihuahua, Chih. México. Chihuahua City, Mexico.

== Legacy, honors and death ==
- Simón Bolivar Award, Colegio de Bibliotecónomos of Venezuela, 1970; *El Tiradito Awards, El Tiradito Foundation, 1973 and 1975;
- annual award from League of Mexican-American Women, 1973; *Rosenzweig Award, Arizona State Library Association, 1976; *Distinguished Alumni Award, Kent State University School of Library Science.
- Christopher F. Grippo, and University of Arizona Graduate Library School. 1984. Festschrift in Honor of Dr. Arnulfo D. Trejo. Tucson, Ariz.: Graduate Library School, College of Education, University of Arizona.
- In 2001, the American Library Association awarded Trejo American Library Association Honorary Membership an honor conferred on a living citizen of any country whose contribution to librarianship or a closely related field is so outstanding that it is of lasting importance to the advancement of the whole field of library service. It is intended to reflect honor upon the ALA as well as upon the individual.

Arnulfo Trejo died in his home in Tucson, Arizona in 2002, at the age of 79. He was survived by his wife, Ninfa, and daughters, Rachel, Rebecca and Ruth.

An assessment of his career by Felipe Meneses-Tello expanded and deepened an understanding of the legacy of Arnulfo Trejo among the Ibero-American library community.

== Publications ==
- Bibliografía Comentada Sobre Administración de Negocios (title means Annotated Bibliography on Business Administration), Addison-Wesley, 1967, 2nd edition published as Bibliografía Comentada Sobre Adminsitración de Negocios y Disciplinas Conexas, 1967.
- Dicionario Etimólogico del Léxico de la Delincuencia (title means Etymological Dictionary of the Language of Delinquency), UTEHA, 1969.
- (Editor) Directory of Spanish-Speaking/Spanish Surnamed Librarians in the United States, Bureau of School Services, College of Education, University of Arizona, 1973, revised edition published as Quién es Quién: A Who's Who of Hispanic-Heritage Librarians in the United States, Bureau of School Services, College of Education, University of Arizona, 1986.
- Bibliografía Chicana: A Guide to Information Services, Gale, 1975.
- (Editor and contributor) Proceedings of the April 28–29, 1978, Seminario on Library and Information Services for the Spanish-Speaking: A Contribution to the Arizona Pre-White House Conference, Graduate Library Institute for Spanish-Speaking Americans (Tucson, Arizona), 1978.
- (Editor and contributor) The Chicanos: As We See Ourselves (essays by fourteen Chicano scholars), University of Arizona Press, 1979.
- Contributor to American Libraries, Arizona Highways, Folklore Americas, Wilson Library Bulletin, and other magazines.
