= Children's Literature Lecture Award =

- Awarded for: body of work in the field of children's literature
- Country: United States
- Presented by: Association for Library Service to Children, a division of the American Library Association
- First award: 1970
- Website: www.ala.org/alsc/awardsgrants/profawards/chll

The Children's Literature Lecture Award (known as the May Hill Arbuthnot Lecture from 1970 to 2020) is an annual event sponsored by the Association for Library Service to Children (ALSC), a division of the American Library Association. The organization counts selection as the lecturer among its "Book & Media Awards", for selection recognizes a career contribution to children's literature. At the same time, the lecturer "shall prepare a paper considered to be a significant contribution to the field of children's literature", to be delivered as the Children's Literature Lecture and to be published in the ALSC journal Children & Libraries.

The lecture was funded in 1969 to honor the educator May Hill Arbuthnot and first held in 1970. Arbuthnot was one creator of "Dick and Jane" readers and she wrote the first three editions of Children and Books (Scott, Foresman 1947, 1957, 1964). When informed of the new honorary lecture in her name, "she recalled 'that long stretch of years when I was dashing from one end of the country to the other, bringing children and books together by way of the spoken word.'" It was renamed the "Children's Literature Lecture Award" in January 2020.

The lecturer may be an "author, critic, librarian, historian, or teacher of children's literature, of any country". The Children's Literature Lecture Award Committee selects one from a list of nominations, a process currently completed in January 15 to 18 months before the event. Then institutions apply to be the host: any "library school, department of education in college or university, or a children's library system". Several months later the same committee selects the host institution from the applicants.

== Lectures ==
May Hill Arbuthnot Lectures
Year	Lecturer	Title	Host	City, State
2026	Cynthia Leitich Smith	tba	tba	tba
2025	Kyle Lukoff	"What Do We Ask Books To Do"	Multnomah County Library	Portland, Oregon
2024	Rita Williams-Garcia	"A Funny Thing About Memory"	Carnegie Library of Pittsburgh	Pittsburgh, Pennsylvania
2023	Bryan Collier	"Dreamwalker"	Dayton Metro Library; University of Dayton	Dayton, Ohio
2022	No lecturer selected due to delays in lectures caused by COVID-19			
2021	Rudine Sims Bishop	Due to "unforeseen circumstances", no lecture was given. Instead, a "virtual celebration of Dr. Bishop's work and her impact on the field of children's literature" was hosted by ALSC.	Hosted virtually due to the COVID-19 pandemic	
2020	Neil Gaiman		Sacramento Public Library	Sacramento, California
2019	Debbie Reese	"An Indigenous Critique of Whiteness in Children's Literature"	University of Wisconsin–Madison	Madison, Wisconsin
2018	Naomi Shihab Nye	"REFRESHMENTS WILL BE SERVED - Our Lives of Reading & Writing"	Western Washington University; Whatcom County Library System	Bellingham, Washington
2017	Jacqueline Woodson	"What Gets Left Behind: Stories From The Great Migration"	South Carolina State Library; The city of Columbia, South Carolina	Columbia, South Carolina
2016	Pat Mora	"Bookjoy! ¡Alegría en los libros!"	Santa Barbara Public Library System	Santa Barbara, California
2015	Brian Selznick	"Love Is a Dangerous Angel: Thoughts on Queerness and Family in Children's Books"	DC Public Library	Washington, DC
2014	Andrea Davis Pinkney	"Rejoice the Legacy" (YouTube recording. Pinkney appears 12:15 minutes in.)	Children's Literature Research Collections; University of Minnesota Libraries	Minneapolis, Minnesota
2013	Michael Morpurgo	"War Boy to War Horse"	Nazareth College; Youth Services Section of the New York Library Association	Rochester, New York
2012	Peter Sís	"Reading in the Dark" (MUOhio recording)	Miami University	Oxford, Ohio
2011	Lois Lowry	"Unleaving: The Staying Power of Gold" (brief YouTube recording)	St. Louis County Library	Ladue, Missouri
2010	Kathleen T. Horning	"Can Children's Books Save the World? Advocates for Diversity in Children's Books and Libraries"	Riverside County Library System	Riverside, California
2009	Walter Dean Myers	"The Geography of the Heart"	Langston Hughes Library at the Children's Defense Fund Alex Haley Farm	Clinton, Tennessee
2008	David Macaulay	"Thirteen Studios" (YouTube recording)	South Central Library System	Madison, Wisconsin
2007	Kevin Henkes	"Books As Shelter: Going Home Again and Again"	McConnell Center for the Study of Youth Literature, University of Kentucky SLIS	Lexington, Kentucky
2006	Russell Freedman	"The Past Isn't Past: How History Speaks, and What It Says to the Next Generation"	Williamsburg Regional Library; The Library of Virginia; Virginia Foundation for the Humanities	Williamsburg, Virginia
2005	Richard Jackson	"Mutuality"	Free Library of Philadelphia; Julia R. Masterman Laboratory and Demonstration School	Philadelphia, Pennsylvania
2004	Ursula K. Le Guin	"Cheek by Jowl: Animals in Children's Literature"	Maricopa County Library District; Arizona State University; Arizona Center for the Book	Phoenix, Arizona
2003	Maurice Sendak	"Descent into Limbo"	Cambridge Public Library; Children's Literature, Inc.	Cambridge, Massachusetts
2002	Philip Pullman	"So She Went Into the Garden"	Le Frak Hall, Queens College Graduate School of Library and Information Studies	Flushing, New York
2001	Susan Cooper	"Time and Again"	Scottish Rite Center; Multnomah County Library	Portland, Oregon
2000	Hazel Rochman	"A Stranger Comes to Town"	Thomas J. Dodd Research Center at the University of Connecticut	Storrs, Connecticut
1999	Lillian N. Gerhardt	"Editorial License: On Library Selection Connections"	San Jose State University School of Library and Information Science	San Jose, California
1998	Susan Hirschman	"Instead of a Lecture"	Richland County Public Library; College of Library and Information Science at the university of South Carolina	Columbia, South Carolina
1997	Katherine Paterson	"In Search of Wonder"	Northern State University	Aberdeen, South Dakota
1996	Zena Sutherland	"A Life in Review"	Dallas Public Library	Dallas, Texas
1995	Leonard Everett Fisher	"Imaginings and Images"	University of Wisconsin	Milwaukee, Wisconsin
1994	Margaret K. McElderry	"Across the Years, Across the Seas: Notes from an Errant Editor"	Coronado Public Library	Coronado, California
1993	Virginia Hamilton	"Everything of Value: Moral Realism in the Literature for Children"	Virginia Center for the Book	Richmond, Virginia
1992	Charlotte S. Huck	"Developing Lifetime Readers"	Montana Library Association annual conference	Bozeman, Montana
1991	Iona Opie	"The Nature and Function of Children's Lore"	Library of Congress	Washington, DC
1990	Ashley Bryan	"A Tender Bridge"	New Orleans Public Library	New Orleans, Louisiana
1989	Margaret Mahy	"A Dissolving Ghost: Possible Operations of Truth in Children's Books and the Lives of Children"	University of Pittsburgh	Pittsburgh, Pennsylvania
1988	John Bierhorst	"Pushing up the Sun a Little"	University of Oklahoma	Norman, Oklahoma
1987	James Archibald Houston	"A Primitive View of the World"	Northern Illinois University	DeKalb, Illinois
1986	Aidan Chambers	"All of a Tremble to See His Danger"	University of Arkansas	Little Rock, Arkansas
1985	Patricia Wrightson	"Stones into Pools"	Indiana University; Stone Hills Area Library Services Authority	Bloomington, Indiana
1984	Fritz Eichenberg	"Bell, Book and Candle"	Minneapolis Public Library and Information Center	Minneapolis, Minnesota
1983	Leland B. Jacobs	"Children and the Voices of Literature"	Center for the Study of Literature for Young People at the University of Georgia	Athens, Georgia
1982	Dorothy Butler	"From Books to Buttons: Reflections From the Thirties to the Eighties"	Florida State University	Orlando, Florida
1981	Virginia Betancourt	"Information: A Necessity for Survival: Strategies for the Promotion of Children's Books in a Developing Country"	Texas Woman's University	Denton, Texas
1980	Horst Kunze	"German Children's Literature From Its Beginning to the Nineteenth Century: A Historical Perspective"	University of Wisconsin	Milwaukee, Wisconsin
1979	Sheila Egoff	"Beyond the Garden Wall: Some Observations on Current Trends in Children's Literature"	University of South Carolina	Columbia, South Carolina
1978	Uriel Ofek	"Tom and Laura from Right to Left: American Children's Books Experienced by Young Hebrew Readers"	Boston Public Library	Boston, Massachusetts
1977	Shigeo Watanabe	"One of the Dozens"	Boise State University	Boise, Idaho
1976	Jean Fritz	"The Education of an American"	Los Angeles Public Library	Los Angeles, California
1975	Mollie Hunter	"Talent Is Not Enough"	Drexel University	Philadelphia, Pennsylvania
1974	Ivan Southall	"Real Adventure Belongs To Us"	University of Washington	Seattle, Washington
1973	Bettina Hürlimann	"Fortunate Moments in Children's Books"	University of Missouri	Kansas City, Missouri
1972	Mary Ørvig	"One World in Children's Books"	University of Chicago	Chicago, Illinois
1971	John Rowe Townsend	"Standards of Criticism for Children's Literature"	Atlanta Memorial Arts Center	Atlanta, Georgia
1970	Margery Fisher	"Rights and Wrongs"	Case Western Reserve University	Cleveland, Ohio

== Repeat lectures ==
University of Wisconsin–Milwaukee has hosted two lectures.

Two lecture titles allude to The Secret Garden, a 1911 novel by Frances Hodgson Burnett.

== See also ==
- Jean E. Coleman Library Outreach Lecture
- Alice G. Smith Lecture
