= May Hill Arbuthnot =

American writer

- Born: May Hill; August 27, 1884; Mason City, Iowa
- Died: October 2, 1969 (aged 85)
- Education: University of Chicago, Columbia University
- Occupation: Associate professor
- Known for: Children's literacy advocate

May Hill Arbuthnot (August 27, 1884 – October 2, 1969) was an American educator, editor, writer, and critic who devoted her career to the awareness and importance of children's literature. Her efforts expanded and enriched the selection of books for children, libraries, and children's librarians alike. She was selected for American Libraries article "100 Most Important Leaders we had for the 20th Century".

== Early history and education ==
Born in Mason City, Iowa, to Frank and Mary (Seville) Hill in 1884, May Hill grew up in many different cities, going to school in Massachusetts, Minnesota, and Illinois. She grew up fond of books, with both a mother and father who were avid readers, and spent time reading the Book of Common Prayer. May Hill graduated from Hyde Park High School in Chicago, Illinois, in 1912. Because of financial issues, May Hill did not attend college towards her baccalaureate until nine years later. Instead, she received a k-primary supervisor certificate from the University of Chicago in 1913. Hill eventually went on to receive her baccalaureate from the same university in 1922. May also earned her graduate degree from Columbia University in 1924. May Hill married Charles Crisswell Arbuthnot in 1932. They met later in her career, while he was head of the economics department at Western Reserve University (now Case Western Reserve University).

== Career ==
=== Early career ===
May Hill Arbuthnot held many jobs while she was continuing her education. She was a kindergarten teacher and director in Wisconsin, lead a teacher training program in New York City, and taught children's literature at the University of Chicago. In Pioneers and Leaders in Library Services to Youth, Marilyn Miller describes how Arbuthnot contributed to the beginning of nursery training schools in Ohio. In 1922, she became the principle of a kindergarten primary training school in Cleveland, Ohio. In 1927, with her valiant efforts, this training school became the department of elementary education at Western Reserve University. After directing this move, Arbuthnot became an associate professor at the university. This school became a key school in teaching and training professionals and parents alike in the development of children and children's literacy. She continued this career until 1950, which was her year of retirement. Arbuthnot also contributed in other ways to children's literacy. She was a review editor where she reviewed children's books for Children's Education from 1933 to 1943 and then for Elementary English from 1948 to 1950.

=== Published books ===
May Hill Arbuthnot's biggest contribution to the field of library and information science was her wide array of published books. For higher education Arbuthnot authored the textbook, Children and Books. First published in 1947, the book has gone on for multiple editions, co-authored by Zena Sutherland. This book was used in children's literature classes for many decades. Another contribution to children's literacy was the Basic Reader Series. In 1947, Arbuthnot and William S. Gray, a friend from the University of Chicago, developed and co-authored this series for early readers. The series was quite popular, and is now well known as the first of the Dick and Jane series. Besides the popularity of this series, it did not come without criticism. Some critics believed Arbuthnot "valued function over literary merit". Even after Arbuthnot retired from being an associate professor at the university, she continued to publish books and give lectures. Some of her last contributions to the publishing world are her anthologies. After retirement, she built many anthologies that were made to point educators of children to collections of books that would accompany their teachings. Two of the well known anthologies include Time for Poetry (1951), and Arbuthnot Anthology of Children's Literature (1953). Both of these have continued on with multiple editions.

== Awards ==
May Hill Arbuthnot received two awards after her retirement. In 1959, the Women's National Book Association honored her with the Constance Lindsay Skinner Medal (now named WNBA Award). This award honors "a living American woman who derives part or all of her income from books and allied arts, and who has done meritorious work in the world of books beyond the duties or responsibilities of her profession or occupation". In 1964, she was recognized with the Regina Medal from the Catholic Library Association. This medal honors excellence in the field of children's literature. Its recipient is recognized for their "continued, distinguished contribution to children's literature without regard to the nature of the contribution".

== The Arbuthnot Honor Lecture and Arbuthnot Award ==
First established in 1969 by the Association for Library Service to Children (ALSC), a division of the American Library Association (ALA), and in conjunction with Scott, Foresman and Co., the Arbuthnot Honor Lecture is put on by a person in the profession of children's literature. This includes historians, librarians, educators, critics, or authors. In the inaugural lecture, Arbuthnot spoke of the importance of the "spoken word", that she spent many years "…bringing children and books together by way of spoken word". The Arbuthnot Award, given out by the International Reading Association, is a yearly $800 awarded to excellence in teaching having to do with children or young adult literature at the college level.

== Conclusion ==
Her philosophy can be further explained by her introduction to the book, The Real Mother Goose, by Blanche Fisher Wright. In this introduction, she explains her idea of the importance of books for children. She believed a very simple philosophy of books to be possible of garnering huge interest from children, and in turn, children will increase their literacy skills by enjoying and rereading them over and over. Also, parents have the ability to help children learn just by reading and interacting with them. She describes how the hardware of the book helps to facilitate learning. She goes on to describe this learning style by saying, "As a result, children will know more words and speak them more crisply and clearly than they would have without Mother Goose. Above all, they will carry with them some feeling for the fun, freshness and sheer delight of poetry. All this because of Mother Goose."

== Selected works ==
- May Hill Arbuthnot (1947). Children and Books. Chicago: Scott, Foresman. Four editions appeared with Arbuthnot as sole author; four more editions had appeared by 1991 with Zena Sutherland as the first author, jointly with May Arbuthnot (8th ed. has ISBN 0-673-46357-5).
