= Rose Treviño =

American children's librarian (1951–2010)

Rose Treviño

Rose Violet Zertuche Treviño (December 17, 1951 – April 30, 2010) born in San Antonio, Texas was a distinguished children's librarian, advocate of library services for Latinos and the first Hispanic branch manager in San Antonio, Texas. Treviño created the nation's first bilingual 'Born to Read' program and was the first Latino to serve as chair of the Newbery Award committee. She also served as the Youth Services Coordinator for the Houston Public Library System. A commemorative scholarship for Latinos and/or Spanish speakers pursuing a degree in young adult or children librarianship was created by REFORMA, the National Association to Promote Library and Information Services to Latinos and the Spanish Speaking, in her name.

== Early life ==
Treviño was born in San Antonio, Texas and was the granddaughter of Mexican immigrants. She was the oldest of five siblings and the first in her family to graduate from college and to earn a master's degree. She credits her passion for books and libraries to her mother, Mary Zertuche, who read to her and took her to the library regularly. She completed high school at Providence High School in San Antonio, Texas. In 1975, Treviño earned a master's degree in Library Science degree from Our Lady of the Lake University in San Antonio, Texas.

== Career ==
In 1975, Treviño started her 35-year career as a children's librarian. She worked for the San Antonio Library System for 28 years and with Houston Public Library, serving one of the largest Spanish-speaking communities in the United States for the last seven years of her career before retiring. She was an active member of the American Library Association, the Texas Library Association, the Association for Library Service to Children, the Public Library Association, and REFORMA, serving on many committees. Treviño worked arduously to create and promote children library services for Latinos. Treviño was awarded the prestigious Siddie Joe Johnson Award for distinguished service to children. She was the author of the book Read Me a Rhyme in Spanish and English (2009), and editor of the book The Pura Belpré Awards: Celebrating Latino Authors and Illustrators (2006). Treviño served as chair of the Pura Belpré Awards Committee and, in 2009, was chair of the Newbery Award and presented the medal to author Neil Geiman for The Graveyard Book (HarperCollins, 2008). She retired in October 2009 and died of cancer on April 30, 2010.

== Published works ==
=== Author ===
Read Me a Rhyme in Spanish and English, American Library Association Editions (January 1, 2009).

=== Editor ===
The Pura Belpré Awards: Celebrating Latino Authors and Illustrators, American Library Association Editions (June 30, 2006).
