= Fisher Wright =

Fisher Wright may refer to:

- Fisher-Wright population, a term in population genetics
- Blanche Fisher Wright (1887-1971)?, American children's book illustrator
