= Library services for migrant farmworkers in the United States =

Library services for migrant farmworkers include specialized outreach models, collection development, and information designed to meet agricultural workers' needs. Migrant and seasonal farmworkers (MSFWs) face information gaps and challenges because they live far from urban centers, work long hours, have limited access to devices and internet connectivity, and encounter language barriers. In library and information science (LIS), researchers argue that serving this population requires services beyond traditional library offerings focused on books, reading, and physical spaces. Programs serving this population commonly use mobile libraries, bilingual collections, flexible registration policies, and dedicated community outreach groups to bring information, literacy, education, health programs, and legal services directly to rural and agricultural populations.

== Background ==
Demographically, according to the National Agricultural Workers Survey, approximately 78% of U.S. crop workers identify as Hispanic, along with a growing presence of people of Indigenous descent from Mexico and Central America. Migrant farmworkers contribute to the agricultural economy, often traveling long distances to work seasonal harvests. Historically, however, scholars have described migrant farmworkers as being largely excluded from the design and planning of public services. In library and information science, professional organizations such as the American Library Association (ALA) and REFORMA have advocated for equitable access to information for these communities, recognizing that traditional library services often do not reach them.

== Information barriers ==
Migrant agricultural workers face barriers to accessing public libraries and the services and information they offer.

=== Geographic barriers ===
Some farmworkers live in employer-provided camps, while others live in rural community housing isolated from urban centers. Many of these workers lack transportation and work 10- to 12-hour days, making it difficult to visit a public library.

=== Language barriers ===
Limited English proficiency impacts access to information and library programs. Additionally, in recent years, the number of workers who speak Indigenous languages (such as Mixtec or Triqui) has grown, meaning even Spanish-language collections may not be sufficient.

=== Institutional fear ===
Because libraries are government-funded institutions, undocumented farmworkers or those with families where several members lack legal immigration status may avoid approaching libraries and sharing personal information to obtain a library card, fearing this could expose them to immigration agencies. They also often lack proof of address because frequent moves between work sites make it difficult to provide one.

== Outreach and service strategies ==
To address these barriers, public libraries have developed specialized programs and services for agricultural communities.

=== Mobile libraries and bookmobiles ===
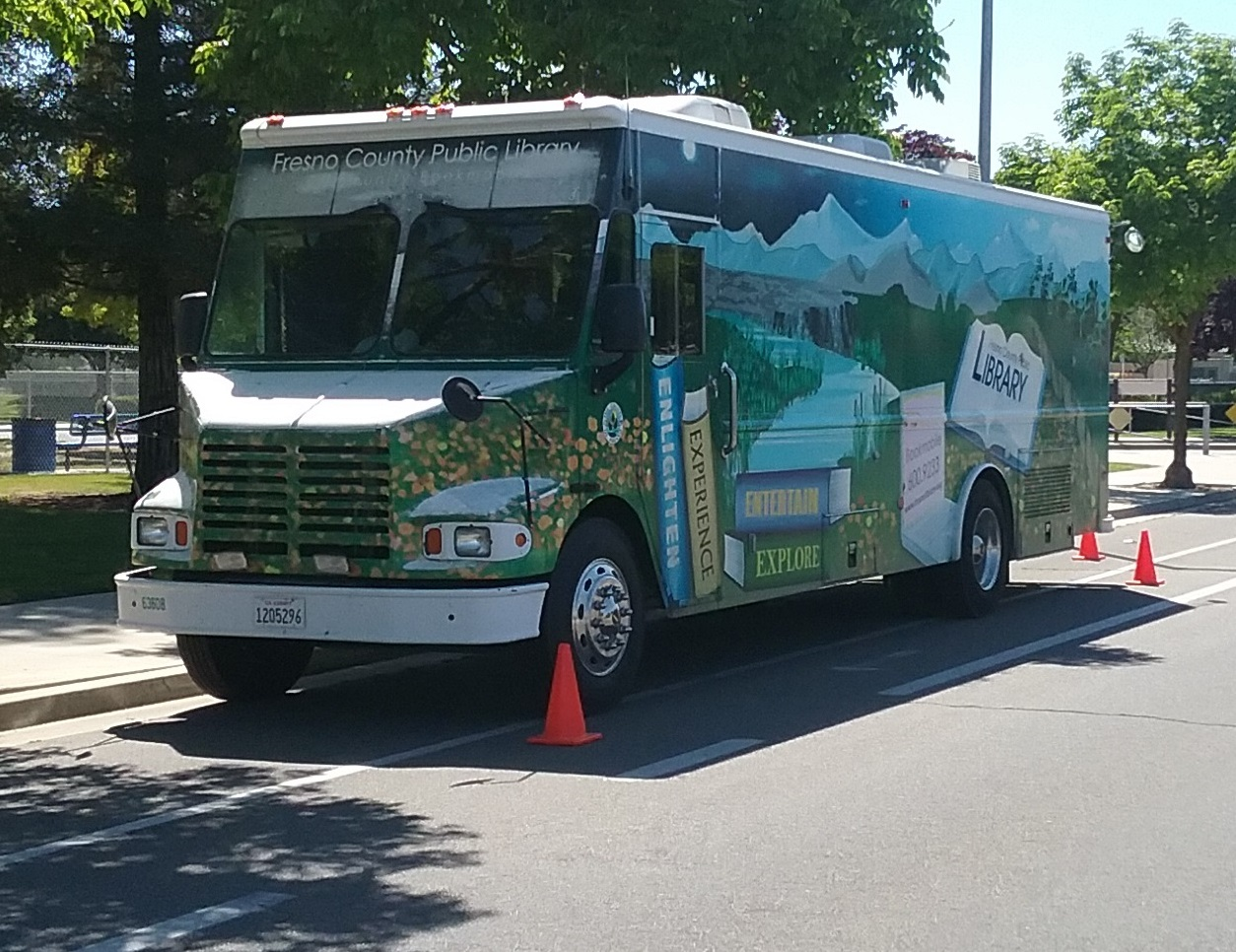
Bookmobile of the Fresno County Public Library in California (2019)

Mobile units, such as the Yolo County Library's bookmobile, travel to migrant housing centers, community centers, and rural areas. These mobile libraries include Wi-Fi, laptops, and access to books and other materials.

=== Culturally relevant collections ===
Some mobile libraries select materials to meet these communities' needs, such as bilingual books, English language learning books, novels, and audiobooks.

=== Civic and legal information ===
Some libraries partner with health and legal organizations to provide these communities with information on health, safety, legal resources, labor rights protections, and immigration resources.

=== Alternative registration policies ===
Some libraries accept alternative forms of proof of residence to issue library cards.
