= Lucia M. Gonzalez =

American writer

Lucia M Gonzalez
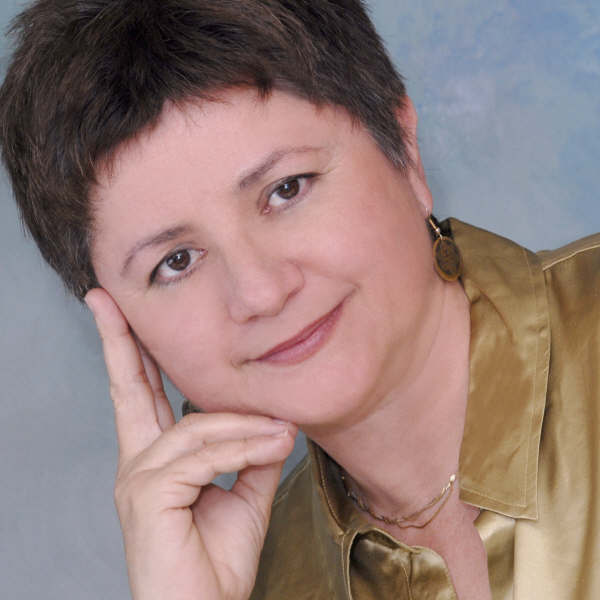
- Born: Lucia Martinez; 13 December 1957 (age 68); Caimito, Cuba^{1}
- Occupations: Author, Librarian, Storyteller, Puppeteer.
- Writing career
- Genres: Storytelling, Folklore, Fun, Historical Fiction, Latino Children's Literature
- Website: luciagonzalezbooks.com

Lucia M. Gonzalez is a children's author and librarian. In 2020 she was elected as president of the Association for Library Service to Children of the American Library Association. She was president of REFORMA in 2010-2011.

== Personal life ==
She was born in Caimito del Guayabal, Cuba. She moved with her parents and sister to the United States in 1970, at the age of 12. Since then she has lived in Florida, California, Spain and Venezuela.

== Education ==
She attended North Miami Senior High (1976) She received her Bachelor of Arts in History from University of California, Santa Barbara, in July 1983, And her Master of Arts, in Library and Information Science, from the School of Information, University of South Florida Tampa Bay, Florida, in April 1991.

== Career ==
An accomplished storyteller, puppeteer, and children's librarian, Gonzalez started her career in library services to children in 1987 after receiving the Bachelor of Arts Degree in History from the University of California, Santa Barbara, and while pursuing her Masters in Library Science at the University of South Florida. She is the author of the bilingual books The Bossy Gallito winner of the Pura Belpré Award for Children's Literature Honor Medal and named one of New York Public Library's 100 Picture Books Everyone Should Know; and Señor Cat's Romance and Other Favorite Stories from Latin America, an Americas Award Commended Title. Gonzalez was named the 1998 Jean Key Gates Distinguished Alumna by the University of South Florida School of Library and Information Science. Her book, The Storyteller's Candle is a bilingual picture book illustrated by Lulu Delacre, winner of the 2008 Pura Belpré Children's Literature Honor Medal.

=== Professional library experience ===
- Library Director, North Miami Public Library (2011–2023)
- Associate Director for Programming, Youth Services and Family Literacy, Broward County Library (2004-2009)
- Assistant Section Manager. Broward County Library, Youth Services, Main Library (2003)
- Programs Coordinator for the Miami-Dade Public Library System (2000–2003)
- Children’s Department Manager, West Kendall Regional Library (1994–1999)
- Children’s Librarian / Assistant Branch Manager, Hispanic Branch Library (1994–99)
- Children’s Outreach Librarian, Imagination Factory (1990–1992)

=== Professional affiliations ===
- American Library Association (ALA)
- Association of Library Service to Children (ALSC)
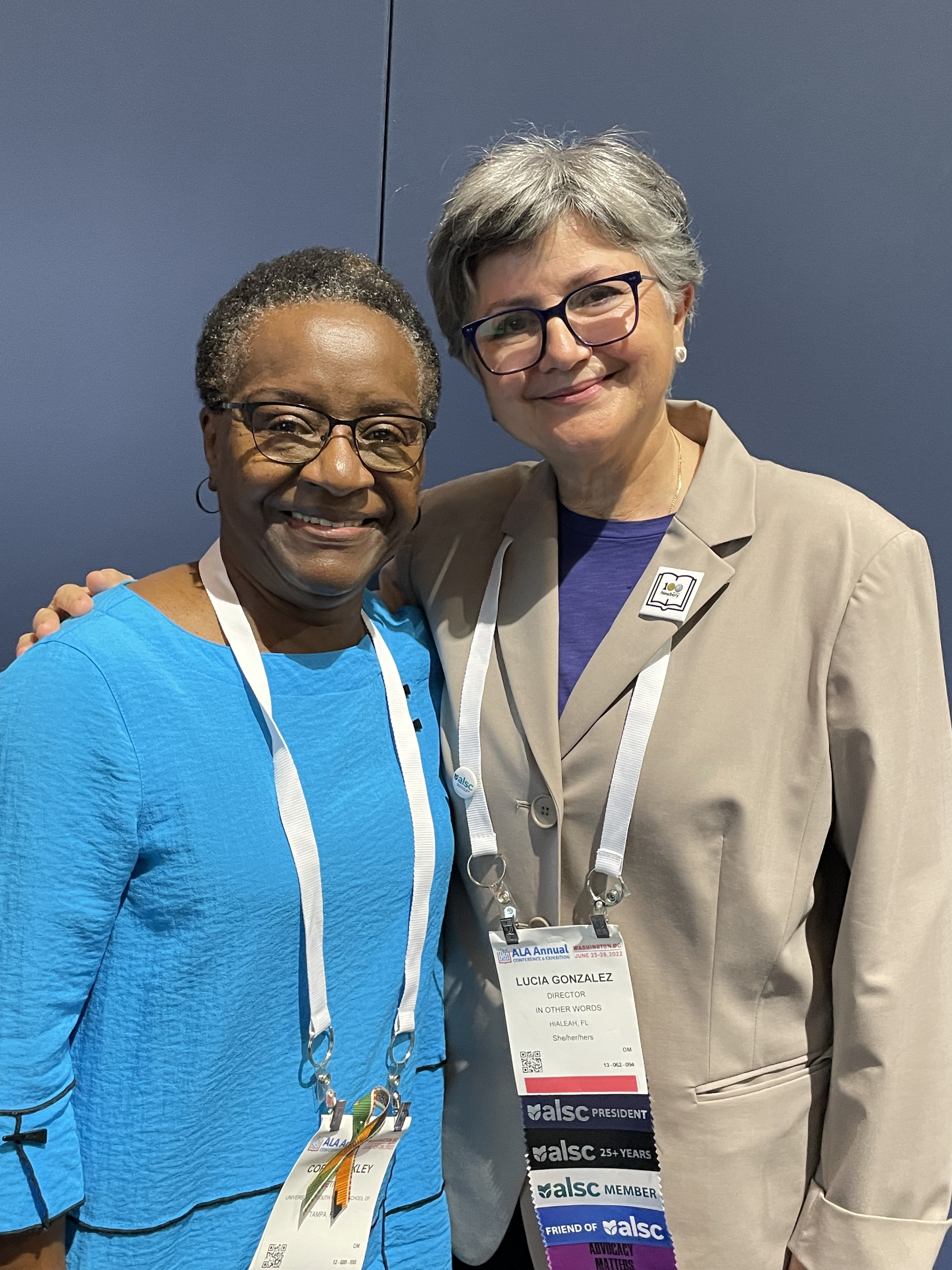
  Lucia Gonzalez, President of ALSC 2021-2022, with Speaker, Dr.Cora Dunkley at ALSC President's Program in Washington, DC.
- Ethnic Materials and Information Exchange Round Table (ALA / EMIERT)
- Florida Library Association (FLA)
- National Storytelling Association (NSA)
- REFORMA (The National Association to Promote Library & Information Services to Latinos and the Spanish Speaking)

=== Presentations highlights ===
- 2021 University of South Florida School of Information Alice G. Smith Lecture "Changing the Face of Librarianship: REFORMA and Library Services to Latino Communities," with Alicia K. Long.
- ALA Annual Conferences (1995, 1997, 1998; 2006, 2008) – Presentations included participation in panels discussing Latino children’s literature, bilingual books, bilingual programs and multicultural services in libraries, as well as storytelling performances and multiple author events.
- REFORMA National Conference III (2008) – Panel presenter, The Bilingual Mind. Noche de Cuentos @ the Border, program coordinator and performer.
- University of South Carolina’s Latino Children’s Literature Conference (2008 and 2009).
- Texas Library Association (1995 and 2009) – Author presentation: Latina Heroines Among Us: Writing the Community-Based Biography.
- Miami Book Fair International (1996, 2001, 2003, and 2008)- Author presentations to schools
- Novello Festival of Reading (October 1998 and 2008).
- International American School of Warsaw (Poland, 1999).
- ContArte Festival of the Word (Cuba, 2003) – Storytelling.
- National Council of Teachers of English 87th Convention (1997).
- Shenandoah University (1997).
- Texas Woman’s University Children’s Literature Conferences (1997).

== Awards and honors ==
- 2024. "Lucia Martinez Gonzalez Tot Lot," a children's playground, dedicated by City of North Miami adjacent to the North Miami Public Library where Gonzalez served as director until 2023.
- 2023 Elizabeth Martinez Lifetime Achievement Award.
- 2021-2022 President of the Association of Library Service to Children.
- 2008 Pura Belpré Children’s Literature Honor Medal for The Storyteller's Candle/La velita de los cuentos.
- 1996 ALA/ALSC Pura Belpré Children’s Literature Honor Medal for The Bossy Gallito.
- Selected by the USF/SLIS Alumni Society as the School’s 1998 "Outstanding Graduate."

== Publications ==
- The Storyteller's Candle / La velita de los cuentos.
- Picture Books in Spanish: A Best of the Best Backlist. Criticas Magazine. May/June, 2002.
- "Cultural Integration at the Library". Library Services to Youth of Hispanic Heritage: Proceedings from the Trejo Foster Foundation Fourth National Institute. McFarland & Company Inc., 1999.
- Señor Cat’s Romance and other Favorite Stories from Latin America.
- The Bossy Gallito.
- Juan Bobo and the Buñuelos. From Sea to Shining Sea: An Anthology of American Folklore.
