= Zena Sutherland =

American journalist

- Born: 1915; Winthrop, Massachusetts, U.S.
- Died: June 12, 2002 (aged 86); Chicago, Illinois, U.S.
- Notable work: Children and Books

Zena Sutherland (1915 – June 12, 2002) was an American reviewer of children's literature. She is best known for her editorship and contributions to the Bulletin of the Center for Children's Books and as the author of the library science textbook Children and Books.

== Early life and education ==
Sutherland was born in Winthrop, Massachusetts in 1915 but was raised in Chicago by her mother after her parents’ divorce. She graduated from the University of Chicago in 1937. In 1966, she received her master's, also from the University of Chicago, in library science.

== Career ==
She edited the Bulletin of the Center for Children's Books for almost 30 years. From 1966 until 1972, Sutherland also wrote a monthly column for the Saturday Review called Books for Young People before becoming the children's books editor for the Chicago Tribune between 1972 and 1984.

Sutherland was a faculty member at the University of Chicago Graduate Library School between 1972 and 1986 where she taught two classes, "Children's Literature" and "Literature for Young Adults".

She was the graduate school advisor for Dr. Carla Hayden who was appointed as Librarian of Congress in 2016.

During Sutherland's 40-year career of reviewing children's literature, she wrote 19 books and reviewed over 30,000 children's books.

Sutherland also wrote the textbook, Children and Books. Several editions were co-authored by Sutherland and May Hill Arbuthnot. Sutherland wrote five additional editions, the last of which was published in 1996, after Arbuthnot's death in 1969.

Two of her former students established the Zena Sutherland Lecture Series in 1983 in her honor. It was funded by proceeds from the volume, Celebrating Children’s Books: Essays on Children’s Literature in Honor of Zena Sutherland.

In 1995, the Zena Sutherland Awards for Excellence in Children's Literature was established by Philip Matsikas, Donna Schatt and Karen Putman.

In 1996 she received the Children's Literature Lecture Award (known as the May Hill Arbuthnot Lecture from 1970- 2020). The lecture is given by an individual who has made a significant contribution to the field of children's literature. Sutherland's lecture was titled “A Life in Review,” presented at the Dallas Public Library.

She was honored with the Association for Library Service to Children. “Distinguished Service Award” in 1997.

She was awarded the Norman Maclean Faculty Award 1998 in recognition of her teaching career.

== Personal life ==
Sutherland married Roland Bailey in 1937 and they had three children, Stephen, Thomas and Katherine. They later divorced. She was married to her second husband, Alec Sutherland, from 1964 until his death in 1996. On June 12, 2002, Sutherland died of cancer while in hospital in Chicago.
