= Alice G. Smith Lecture =

Annual event at the University of South Florida

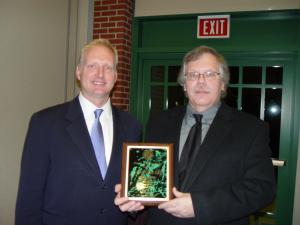
James E. Andrews, 2020 Lecturer & John M. Budd, 2009 Lecturer. Alice G. Smith Lecture.

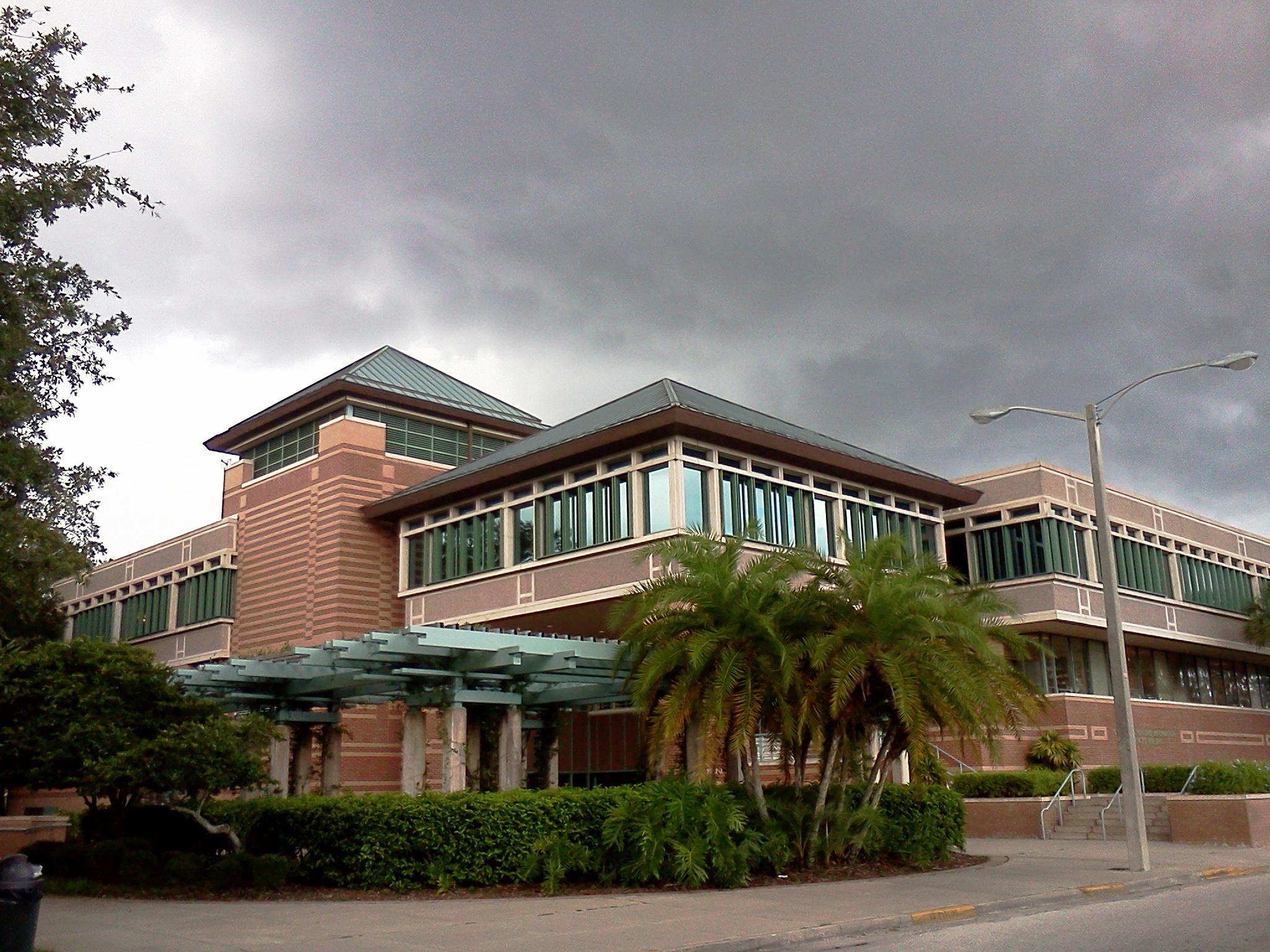
USF School of Information

The Alice G. Smith Lecture, established in 1989, is sponsored by the University of South Florida School of Information (part of the College of Arts and Sciences). The lecture is an annual recognition of a scholar or author whose achievements have been instrumental in the development of librarianship or information studies. The lecture series honors the memory of the School's first director, Alice Gullen Smith, known for her work with youth and bibliotherapy. The Lecture Fund was created with the purpose of memorializing the work of Smith, who was central to the School's first accreditation by the American Library Association in 1975.

Bernadette Storck, archivist for the Florida Library Association has provided an oral history of the development of libraries in Tampa, Florida that details the contributions of Smith including her establishment of the Tampa Book Fair that encouraged thousands of children to foster a love for books and reading

The lecture is usually presented at the Tampa campus of the University of South Florida, School of Information. However, the 2010 lecture was held at the Florida Atlantic University Library in Boca Raton; the 25th anniversary lecture was held at the annual conference of the Florida Library Association on May 7, 2014 in Orlando, Florida; the 30th lecture at the Robert W. Saunders Sr. Public Library a branch of the Tampa–Hillsborough County Public Library System in historic Ybor City and the 37th lecture at the Florida Library Association Conference in Orlando on May 13, 2026. The Tampa Bay Library Consortium was a community partner for the 2019 lecture.

The 31st lecture, given by James E. Andrews, was presented at the USFSI Sail Initiative, an interdisciplinary space for the study of information creation due to the COVID-19 pandemic.

== The lecturers ==
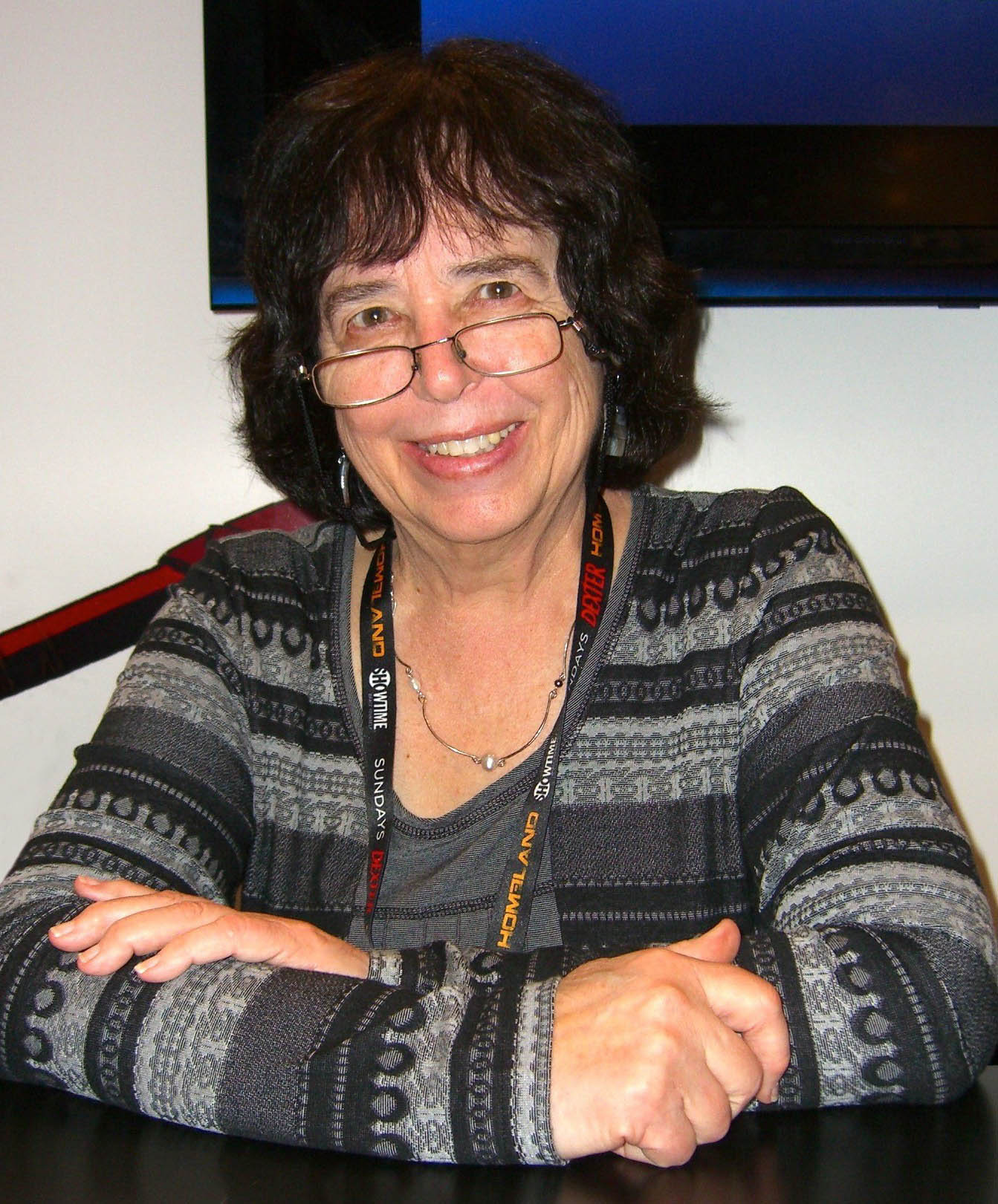
Jane Yolen

- 1989: Jane Yolen, author and storyteller, is the author of many books, including Owl Moon, The Devil's Arithmetic, and How do Dinosaurs Say Goodnight? Her books and stories have won an assortment of awards—two Nebulas, a World Fantasy Award, a Caldecott, the Golden Kite Award, three Mythopoeic awards, two Christopher Medals, a nomination for the National Book Award, and the Jewish Book Award, among many others. She is also the winner of the Kerlan Award from the University of Minnesota, and the Catholic Library's Regina Medal.
- 1990: Kenneth E. Dowlin was City Librarian for the City of San Francisco. Under his direction, a new, contemporary San Francisco Public Library was built.
- 1991: Miriam Drake, former Dean and Professor Emerita of Georgia Tech Library.Winner of the Hugh C. Atkinson Memorial Award.
- 1992: P.B. Mangla, Professor and Head of the Department of Library and Information Science at Delhi University.
- 1994: Mary Somerville is a retired Director of the Miami-Dade Public Library System She oversaw the reopening of hurricane-damaged libraries after Hurricane Andrew.
- 1996: Bernadette Storck was first director of the Pinellas Public Library Cooperative, president and later archivist of the Florida Library Association.
- 1998: Philip M. Turner served simultaneously as a dean and the lead administrator for distance and distributed learning for fifteen years at two institutions: the University of Alabama and the University of North Texas.
- 1999: Isabel Schon, Spanish-speaking and Latino children expert. Author of 25 books and more than 400 research and literary articles Her lecture was published in Library services to Youth of Hispanic Heritage as "From Dona Blanca to Don Quijote." Arnulfo Trejo, Founder of the Trejo Foster Institute for Hispanic Library Education introduced Schon.
- 2000: Satia Marshall Orange, director of the American Library Association
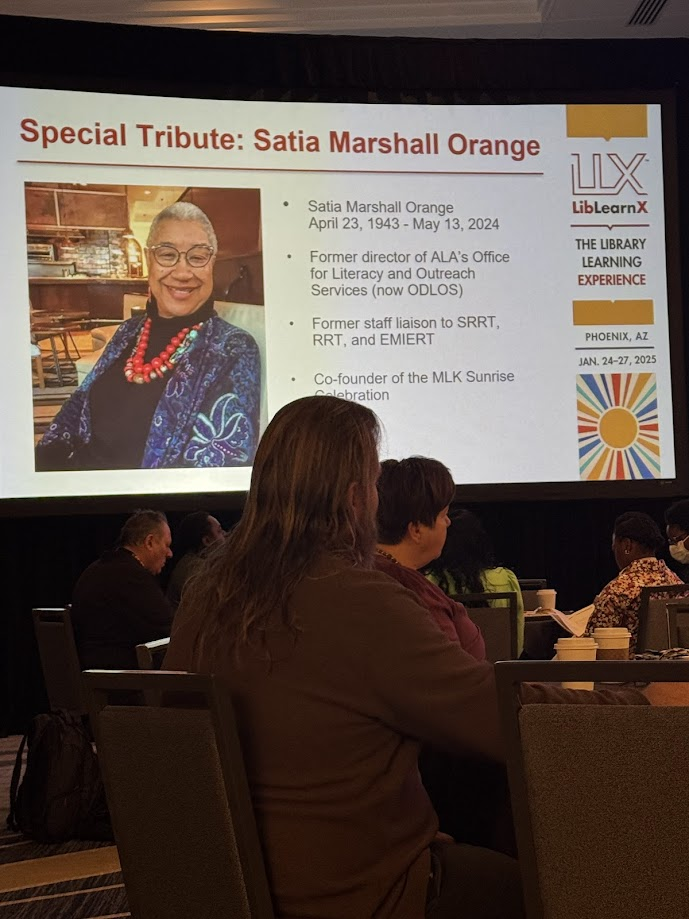
  Satia Marshall Orange tribute at 26th Annual Dr. Martin Luther King, Jr. Holiday Observance & Sunrise Celebration.January 26, 2025
  Office for Literacy and Outreach Services, focusing on areas such as service to people with disabilities, people of color, older adults, and homeless.

== 10th-anniversary lecture ==
- 2002: Robert S. Martin was the first librarian to direct the Institute of Museum and Library Services (IMLS), national President of Beta Phi Mu and a professor at the School of Library and Information Studies at Texas Woman's University. His lecture was titled "Libraries and the Twenty-first Century." Martin was honored with the Presidential Citizens Medal in 2008.
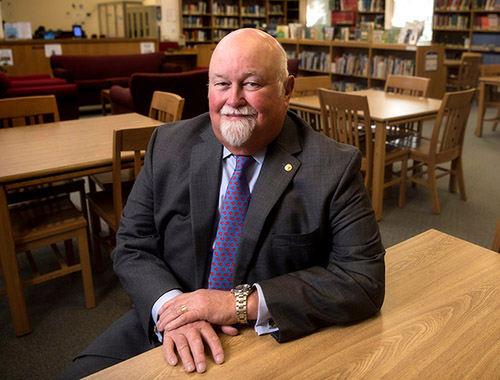
  Robert S. Martin, First Librarian to lead the U.S. Institute of Museum and Library Services
- 2003. Eugene Garfield chemist and leader in the field of library and information science. He is also a past American Society for Information Science & Technology (ASIS&T) president (1998–2000) and the president and founding editor of The Scientist.
- 2004: Samantha K. Hastings is director and professor at the University of South Carolina, School of Library and Information Science. She served as president American Society for Information Science & Technology (ASIS&T) in 2004.
- 2005: Tom W. Sloan was executive director of the Southeast Florida Library Information Network (SEFLIN). Lecture: "Leading 21st Century Libraries."
- 2006: Donald O. Case, professor at University of Kentucky College of Communication and Information Studies, was awarded a Fulbright Fellowship to lecture at the Universidade Nova de Lisboa, Portugal. Case's book, Looking for Information: A Survey of Research on Information Seeking, Needs, and Behavior (2002) was given the "Best Book of the Year" Award by the American Society for Information Science & Technology (ASIS&T).

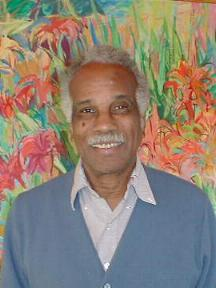
Ashley F. Bryan

- 2007. Ashley Bryan: In commemoration of the 10th anniversary of the death of Smith, author, illustrator, and storyteller Ashley Bryan was chosen to be the Smith Lecturer. He has been honored with the Coretta Scott King-Virginia Hamilton Lifetime Achievement Award. Henrietta M. Smith, professor emerita, made the introduction.
- 2009. John M. Budd, Professor in the School of Information Science and Learning Technologies at the University of Missouri. Among his publications are Knowledge and Knowing in Library and Information Science (2001), which won the 2002 ALA/Highsmith Library Literature Award, and Self-Examination: The Present and Future of Librarianship (2008). He received the Beta Phi Mu Award in 2020.
- 2010. Raymond Santiago was director of the Miami-Dade Public Library System (MDPLS) He won Library Journal Librarian of the Year Award for 2003. This lecture was held in connection with the 14th annual USF School of Library and Information Science East Coast Graduates Reception.
- 2011. C.J. Roberts is President and CEO of the Tampa Bay History Center. Located in downtown Tampa, the Tampa Bay History Center is a non-profit educational institution preserving and promoting historical materials and artifacts from the greater Tampa and Hillsborough County area. The lecture, "A Shared Mission: The Tampa Bay History center and the USF Libraries: Florida Studies Center Partnership," has been uploaded to YouTube.
- 2013: Anthony Betrus professor in the Computer Science/Organizational Leadership and Technology Department at the State University of New York (SUNY Potsdam). He has implemented a six-course, 18-credit hour concentration on Game Development as an option for Information Technology graduate students. Betrus' research interests include the motivational qualities of games and using games for training and instructional purposes.

== 25th anniversary lecture ==
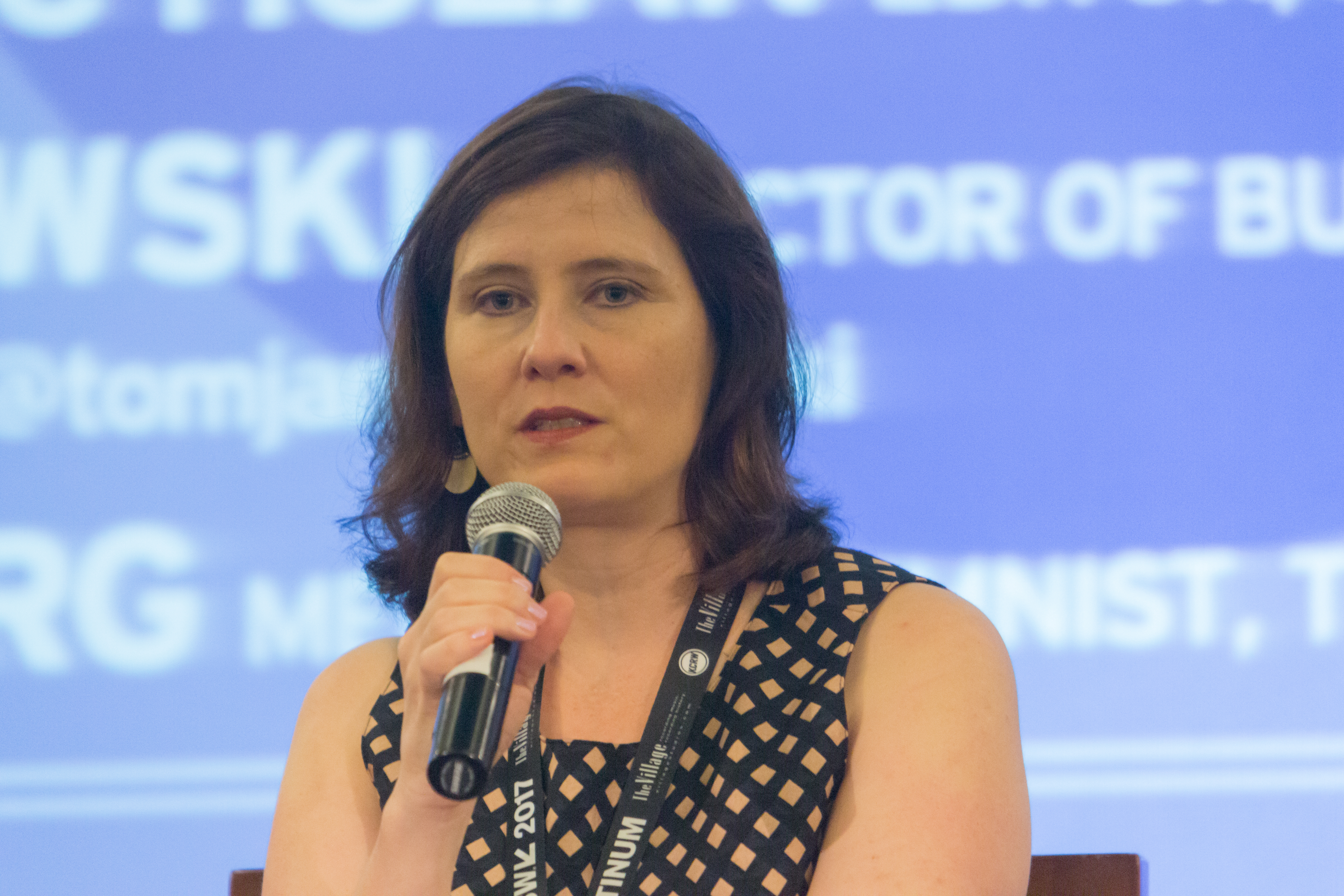
Politifact's Angie Drobnic Holan @ SXSW 2017 (33419985765)

- 2014: Angie Drobnic Holan, editor of PolitiFact.com, the School of Information's 25th anniversary lecturer. She is also the 2014 recipient of the School of Information Distinguished Alumni Award. Holan was a member of the PolitiFact team that won the Pulitzer Prize for its coverage of the 2008 election. She has been with the Tampa Bay Times since 2005 and previously worked at newspapers in Florida, Alabama, Louisiana, and New Mexico. She holds a master's degree in journalism from Columbia University and a master's of library science from the University of South Florida, School of Information. This lecture, the 25th anniversary lecture, was held at the Florida Library Association annual meeting on May 7, 2014.Introduction by Jessica Riggins of the Tampa Bay Library Consortium.
- 2015: Barbara J. Stites, Assoc. Dean at Florida Gulf Coast University. Stites has been president of Florida Library Association. She has also been Director of both the Southwest Florida Library Network and the Tampa Bay Library Consortium. She is the 2008 recipient of the School of Information Distinguished Alumni Award. Stites' lecture, "Doing the Next Right Thing, Simple Lessons for a Successful Career" was presented at the Florida Library Association annual meeting. May 13, 2015.
- 2016: Roy Balleste, director of the Dolly & Homer Hand Law Library at the Stetson University College of Law. Balleste was the 2017 winner of the Nicolas Mateesco Matte Space Law Prize. He is author of Internet Governance: Origins, Current Issues, and Future Possibilities.
- 2017: Douglas W. Oard, professor, University of Maryland, School of Information.: "There's an iSchool in your future (and in your past!)"—the University of South Florida iSchool: "The Virtuous Cycle between Engagement and Resources."
- 2018: Nathan R. Johnson, professor of English at the University of South Florida, historian of librarianship, information, and public memory. His lecture on May 23, 2018 was on "Building Memory's Infrastructure: The Invisible Work of Librarians." It was presented at the Florida Library Association in Orlando. Johnson is author of Architects of Memory: Information and Rhetoric in a Networked Archival Age

== 30th anniversary lecture ==
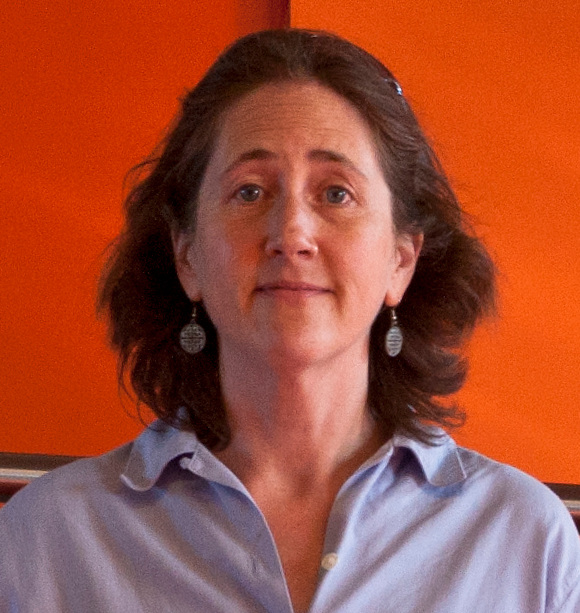
Jessamyn West

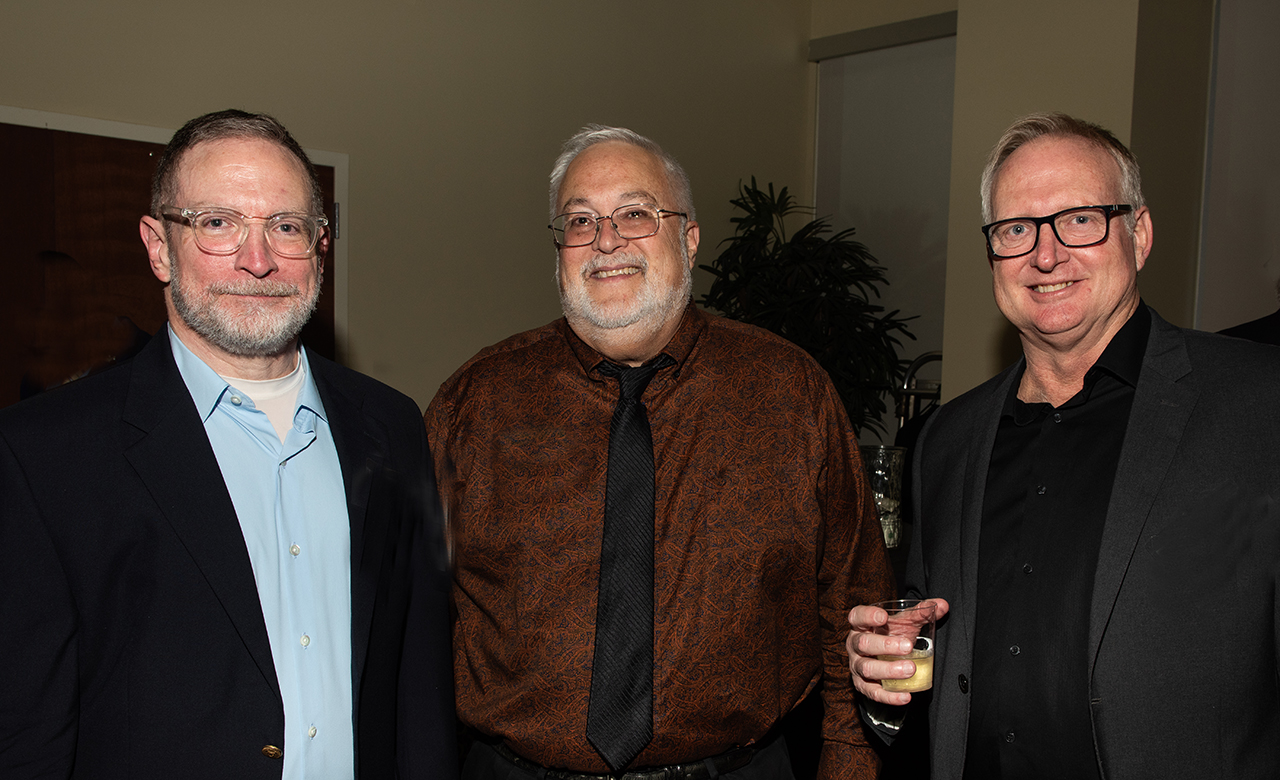
50th Anniversary of the School of Information (SI), University of South Florida-Tampa. Dean of Libraries, Todd Chavez, Alice G. Smith Lecturer, 2023. With Professors at the SI

- 2019: Jessamyn West, creator of librarian.net, was the 2019 Lecturer at the Robert W. Saunders Sr. Public Library in Tampa, Florida. Title of Lecture: "Social Justice is a Library Issue; Libraries are a Social Justice Issue." The Tampa Bay Library Consortium was a community partner for the 2019 lecture.
- 2020: James E. Andrews, director of the School of Information, University of South Florida on the history of the School of Information as it evolved to include STEM-based Intelligence Studies and Cybersecurity. Lecture presented at the USFSI Sail Initiative, an interdisciplinary space for the study of information creation, consumption and avoidance on December 3, 2020.
- 2021. Lucia M. Gonzalez, author and library director at the North Miami, Florida public library and Alicia K. Long, 2022 REFORMA "Librarian of the Year," and academic librarian at the State College of Florida, Manatee–Sarasota, presented a virtual lecture, "Changing the Face of Librarianship: REFORMA and Library Services to Latino Communities," December 16, 2021.
- 2022. Mika Slaughter Nelson, Library Director for the City of St. Petersburg Library System in Florida. She has served on the Executive Board of the National Forum for Black Public Administrators-Tampa Bay. Title of Lecture: "Modern Marvels: Mining Gems to Manifest Dreams." The lecture was rescheduled due to Hurricane Ian but was held successfully on October 27, 2022, and live streamed to a virtual national audience.
- 2023. Todd Chavez, Dean of the University of South Florida Libraries. Dean Chavez has been honored with the Bernie Madison Outstanding Achievement Award by the National Numeracy Network. Lecture was held at the 50th anniversary celebration of the LIS program of the School of Information on November 2, 2023.

== 35th anniversary lecture ==
- 2024. Kimberly DeFusco, Supervisor, Library Media Services. Hillsborough County Public Schools Florida. "To School Librarians: A Love Letter."
- 2025. Tomaro I. Taylor, President of the Society of American Archivists. Director of Special Collections at the University of South Florida Libraries.
- 2026. Nancy Fredericks, Library consultant and former administrator at Pasco County Libraries."Community: The Heart of the Library."

== See also ==
- Children's Literature Lecture Award
- Jean E. Coleman Library Outreach Lecture
- REFORMA, The National Association to Promote Library & Information Services to Latinos and the Spanish Speaking

== Outside sources ==
- Jane Yolen: http://janeyolen.com/
- Bernadette Stork oral history: http://scholarcommons.usf.edu/flstud_oh/307/
- Donald O. Case: http://donaldocase.weebly.com/
- Ashley Bryan: http://ashleybryancenter.org/
- Jessamyn West: librarian.net
- PolitiFact:
