= Sheila Egoff =

Canadian literary critic and historian (1918–2005)

Sheila Egoff OC
- Born: January 20, 1918; Auburn, Maine, US
- Died: May 22, 2005 (aged 87); Vancouver, BC, Canada
- Occupations: Literary critic, historian, librarian
- Title: Professor of children's literature

Academic background
- Education: University College, London

Academic work
- Institutions: University of British Columbia

Sheila Agnes Egoff OC (January 20, 1918 – May 22, 2005) was a Canadian librarian, literary critic, and historian who was Canada's first professor of children's literature. A recipient of the Order of Canada, she was known for her studies of children's fiction including The Republic of Childhood (1967), Thursday's Child (1981) and Worlds Within (1988). The Sheila A. Egoff Children's Literature Prize is named after her.

== Life and career ==
Sheila Agnes Egoff was born in Auburn, Maine, in 1918 to a Bulgarian father and Scottish mother. Her parents Daniel and Lucy Joyce Egoff (née Murray) had met in Galt, Ontario, where they married before moving to Auburn. When Sheila was a year old, her father died in a swimming pool accident, after which the family returned to Galt and experienced financial hardship. Interested in reading from a young age, Egoff worked part-time at a local library in Galt when she was in high school. She received a BA from the University of Toronto in 1947, a post-graduate degree in librarianship from the University College, London, in 1948, and a fellowship from the British Library Association. Alongside her studies, she worked as a librarian at Toronto Public Library where she curated the Osborne Collection of classic British children's fiction. She also worked at the Canadian Library Association.

In 1961, the University of British Columbia recruited Egoff to the newly established School of Librarianship. Her academic career, which spanned over 25 years, saw her become the first tenured professor of children's literature in Canada. Known as a literary critic and historian, she wrote books, developed graduate courses and organized the Pacific Rim Conference on children's literature. According to scholar and collaborator Judith Saltman, her work had "a profound impact" on the teaching, criticism, publishing and librarianship of children's books in Canada. Through texts such as The Republic of Childhood, Egoff both promoted and criticized Canadian children's fiction. Her writings about international fiction in English include Thursday's Child, which won the American Library Association's Ralph R. Shaw Award, and Worlds Within, a study of fantasy literature.

In 1983, Egoff retired from her academic position and resumed her librarianship at the UBC Library. She was appointed an Officer of the Order of Canada, delivered speeches including an Arbuthnot Lecture and a Library of Congress Children's Book Week Lecture, and served as a judge for the Hans Christian Andersen Award. An award in her name, the Sheila A. Egoff Children's Literature Prize, was instituted by the BC Book Prizes in the 1980s. She died of kidney failure in Vancouver in 2005.

== Bibliography ==
=== As author ===
- The Republic of Childhood: A Critical Guide to Canadian Children’s Books, 1967 (revised as The New Republic of Childhood, 1990, with Judith Saltman)
- Notable Canadian Children's Books: An Annotated Catalogue, 1973
- Thursday's Child: Trends and Patterns in Contemporary Children's Literature, 1981
- Worlds Within: Children's Fantasy from the Middle Ages to Today, 1988
- Canadian Children's Books, 1799–1939: A Bibliographical Catalogue, 1992
- Books That Shaped Our Minds: A Bibliographical Catalogue of Selections Chiefly from the Arkley Collection of Early Historical Children's Literature, 1998
- Once Upon a Time: My Life with Children's Books, 2005, with Wendy K. Sutton

=== As editor ===
- Only Connect: Readings on Children's Literature, 1969, with G.T. Stubbs and L.F. Ashley
