= Angie Drobnic Holan =

American journalist

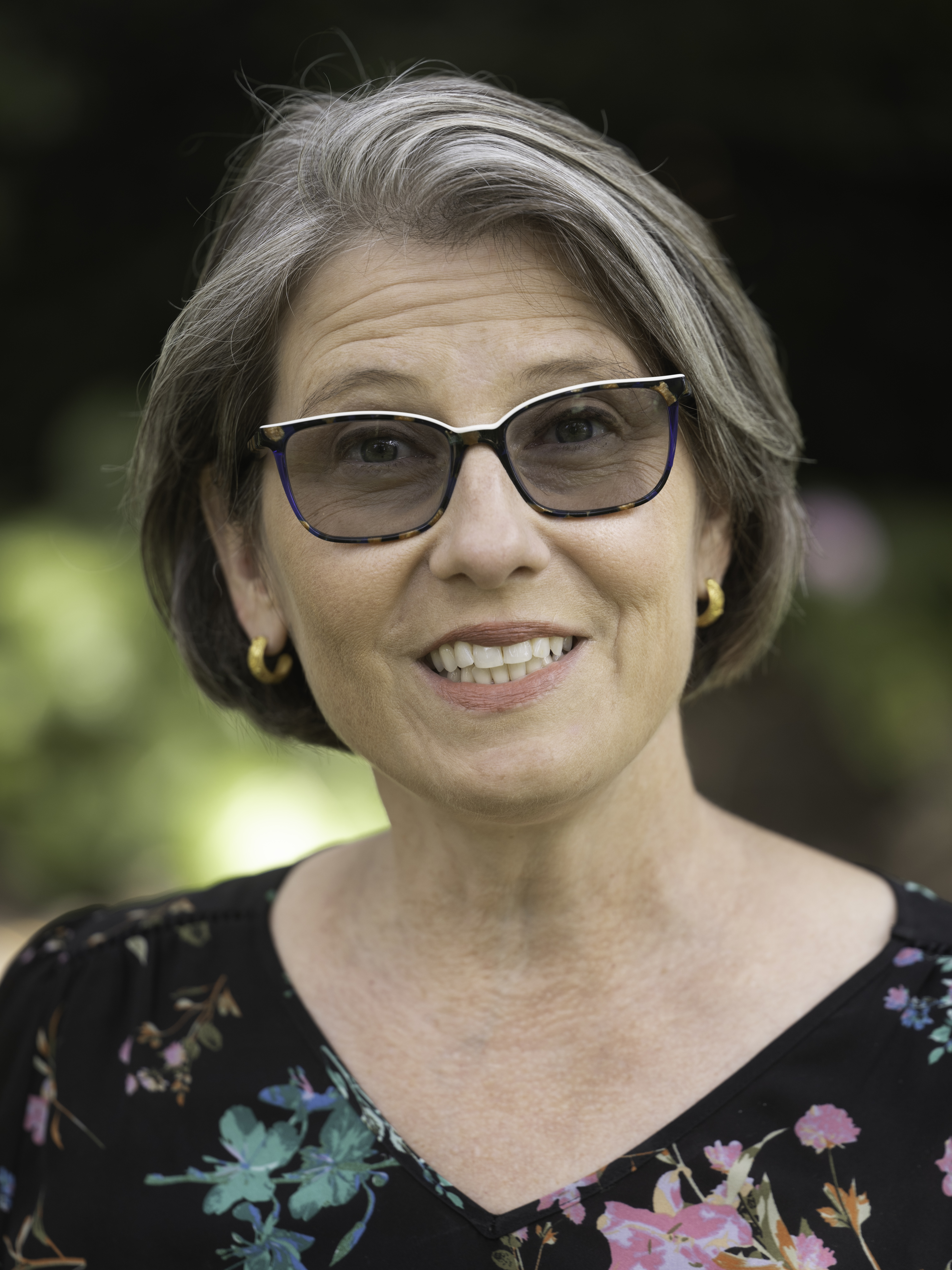
- Drobnic Holan in 2025
- Born: Angie Drobnic
- Education: University of Texas at Austin, Columbia University, University of South Florida
- Occupations: Editor, journalist
- Known for: Former editor-in-chief of PolitiFact
- Website: angieholan.com

Angie Drobnic Holan is the director of the International Fact-Checking Network and former editor-in-chief of PolitiFact. She was part of the Pulitzer Prize winning team of journalists noted for their fact-checking of the 2008 presidential elections in the United States.

== Background ==
Angie Drobnic began her career in journalism at Albuquerque’s NuCity (now Alibi) in 1994, and left in 1998 to pursue her master’s degree in journalism from Columbia University. She also earned a master’s degree in library science from the University of South Florida. More recently she has worked as a business reporter for the Mobile Press-Register, a news reporter for the Tampa Tribune, and a news researcher for the Tampa Bay Times, where she became an expert on the Affordable Care Act. She has also taught undergraduate courses in reporting and writing at the University of Tampa and the University of Louisiana at Lafayette.

== PolitiFact ==
She had been a part of PolitiFact since its launch in 2007, when Tampa Bay Times’ Washington bureau chief Bill Adair sought to create a unique way for covering the 2008 election. She began with the organization as a reporter, then as its deputy editor and editor of PolitiFact Florida. She was named editor-in-chief in 2013 and served in that role until 2023, when she became the director of the International Fact-Checking Network.

== Lectures and awards ==
She has lectured on fact-checking methods for the Global Fact-Checking summits 2014-2017, held in London, Buenos Aires and Madrid; at the Poynter Institute, a journalism school in St. Petersburg, Florida; at the Alice G. Smith Lecture at her alma mater, the University of South Florida and numerous other campuses. In addition to Holan winning a Pulitzer Prize, the USF School of Information presented her with the Jean Key Gates Distinguished Alumni Award.
