= Kathleen de la Peña McCook =

American librarian

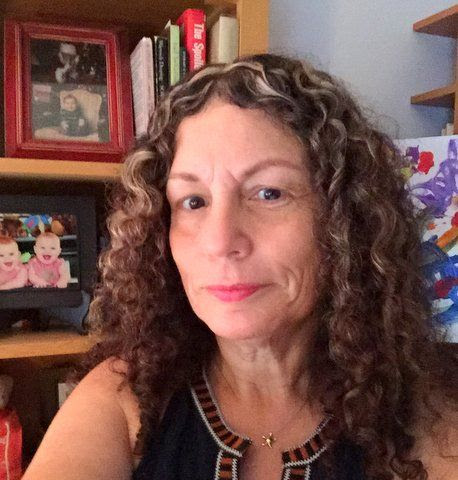
- McCook in 2015
- Occupations: University professor; Librarian
- Employer: University of South Florida
- Known for: Human rights; LIS instruction and research
- Notable work: Introduction to Public Librarianship

Kathleen de la Peña McCook is a library scholar and librarian. She is a Distinguished University Professor in the School of Information at the University of South Florida. Much of her work centers around human rights, First Amendment issues, and the freedom of information.

== Education and career ==
She earned her MA in Library Science from the University of Chicago Graduate Library School in 1974, and her Ph.D. in 1980 from the University of Wisconsin–Madison School of Library and Information Sciences.

McCook has been active in a number of professional organizations within the field of librarianship. She was highly involved in the American Library Association's Committee on the Status of Women in Librarianship. She is a past president of the Association for Library and Information Science Education.

McCook has taught full-time since 1978. She has served on the faculties of Dominican University, the University of Illinois at Urbana-Champaign, and Louisiana State University. Currently, she is serving as a Distinguished University Professor at the University of South Florida's School of Information. She also served as 2003 scholar-in-residence for the Chicago Public Library.

== Awards and honors ==
- 2025 McCook was the subject of a festschrift for her contributions to library scholarship.
- 2019 Joseph W. Lippincott Award for distinguished service to the profession of librarianship.
- 2016 Elizabeth Martinez Lifetime Achievement Award, REFORMA.
- 2010 Jean E. Coleman Library Outreach Lecture. Topic: "Librarians and Human Rights".
- 2004 ALA Office of Diversity, Achievement in Diversity Research Honoree.
- 2003 John Brubaker Award. Outstanding work of literary merit for article, “Social Justice, Personalism and the Practice of Librarianship,” Catholic Library Association for article in Catholic Library World 72 ( Winter, 2001): 80–84.
- 2003 Beta Phi Mu Award for distinguished service to education for librarianship.
- 1997 President of the Association of Library and Information Science Education.
- 1991 Named Outstanding Alumna by the University of Wisconsin–Madison School of Library and Information Studies.
- 1987 American Library Association Equality Award.

== Published books ==
- McCook, Kathleen de la Peña (2004). Introduction to Public Librarianship. New York, NY: Neal-Schuman Publishers.; 2nd ed., 2011, ISBN 978-1555706975; 3rd ed., with Jenny S. Bossaller, 2018, ISBN 978-0838915066
- McCook, Kathleen de la Peña (2000). A Place at the Table: Participating in Community Building. Chicago: American Library Association. ISBN 0838907881.
- Immroth, Barbara; McCook, Kathleen de la Peña (2000). Library Services to Youth of Hispanic Heritage. Jefferson, NC: McFarland. ISBN 0786407905.
- McCook, Kathleen de la Peña (1998). Women of Color in Librarianship: An Oral History. Chicago: American Library Association. ISBN 0838979939.
- McCook, Kathleen de la Peña; Wallace, Danny P., eds. (1990). Adult services: an enduring focus for public libraries. Chicago: American Library Association. ISBN 978-0-8389-0540-1.
- Weibel, Kathleen; McCook, Kathleen de la Peña; Ellsworth, Dianne J., eds. (1979). The role of women in librarianship, 1876 - 1976: the entry, advancement, and struggle for equalization in one profession. A Neal-Schuman professional book. Phoenix: Oryx Press [u.a.] ISBN 978-0-912700-01-4.
