= Elizabeth Martinez (librarian) =

American librarian

Elizabeth Martinez (born April 14, 1948) is an American librarian whose career has focused on bringing diversity, multiculturalism and equality to public libraries and information policy. In 1966 she was the first Mexican American librarian to serve in the state of California. Martinez has served as a library administrator, professor, executive director of the American Library Association, and other roles throughout her career.

== Education ==
Martinez began her studies at the University of Southern California, Los Angeles where she obtained a B.A. in Latin American studies in 1965. While there, she took a children's literature course for the English requirement, but finding a lack of representation for indigenous people and cultures from around the world in the course she began contemplating how literature from non-European nations can be better disseminated to the masses. In 1966 Martinez received her Master of Arts in Library Science degree from the University of California. She later continued her education by receiving a certificate of management from USC in 1978 and an executive management program certificate from the University of California, Irvine in 1986.

== Career ==
Upon graduating with her Library Science degree in 1966, Martinez became California's first Mexican American librarian when she took a position in the Los Angeles County Public Library. She worked in East Los Angeles libraries, and later in various library administrative roles. In 1971 Martinez co-founded REFORMA, which is an affiliate organization of the American Library Association (ALA). Along with Binnie Tate Wilkin, she co-chaired the first ALA policy on diversity "Equity at Issue" in 1986. She was County Librarian of Orange County in 1979-1990 during which time she oversaw the construction of 8 new community libraries among other achievements. In the 1970s at County of Los Angeles Public Library, Martinez developed the Asian, Pacific Islander, Black, Chicano, and Native American resource centers. Martinez served as the executive director of the ALA from 1994 - 1997. During her tenure at the ALA, she developed the Spectrum Scholarship program and the Office for Information Technology Policy was established. She also proposed a program to Bill Gates that resulted in a $200 million grant dedicated to bridging the information gap by connecting more than 4,000 public libraries in poor communities across the US to the Internet. As Director of Los Angeles Public Library she oversaw the construction of the fire-destroyed 500,000 square foot Central Library.

Martinez has been credited with reviving the Salinas Public Library system while she served as the Library Director there due to the expansion of the Cesar Chavez Library and implementation of new programming and multicultural initiatives. She was adjunct faculty at her Alma mater of UCLA until 2003. She was a lecturer at San Jose State University and University of Arizona, and UCLA Senior Fellow. Some of the courses she has taught at SJSU include: Library Services for Racially and Ethnically Diverse Communities, Seminar on Contemporary Issues, and Professional Experience Internships. Martinez has served on various committees and boards throughout her career and is currently appointed a Commissioner of the New Mexico State Library by the governor. In 2013, REFORMA established the Elizabeth Martinez Lifetime Achievement Award to recognize librarians who have served over 20 years and whose leadership has made significant and lasting contributions to Spanish speaking communities. In 2020 her memoir, Jaguar in the Library. The Story of the First Chicana Librarian, was published by Floricanto Press Hispanic Latino Books.

== Selected awards and honors ==
- California Library Association, California Library Hall of Fame 2020
- Women's Institute for Entrepreneurship Adela Award 2013
- American Library Association Equality Award 2013
- ACLU California, Ralph B. Atkinson Monterey County Chapter Award 2013
- REFORMA Elizabeth Martinez Lifetime Achievement Award 2013
- REFORMA Los Angeles, Elizabeth Martinez Scholarship c.2010
- University of Pittsburgh PA School of Information Sciences, Elizabeth Martinez Spectrum Doctoral Fellowship 2006
- MANA, A National Latina Organization, Las Primeras Award 1997
- Pen West Freedom to Write Award 1993
- Hispanic Librarian of the Year 1990
- Orange County Women's Alert Award 1990
- Orange County Women of Achievement Award 1988
- Hispanic Women Recognition Award 1982
- Edmund D. Edleman Certificate of Commendation 1977
- George I. Sanchez Award from the National Association of Spanish Speaking Librarians 1976
