= Leland Jacobs =

American teacher

Leland Blair Jacobs (February 12, 1907–April 4, 1992) was an American professor emeritus of education who was known particularly for his work in the teaching of literature.

== Biography ==
Jacobs was born in Tawas City, Michigan. He earned his bachelor's degree from Michigan State Normal College (now Eastern Michigan University); his master's degree from the University of Michigan; and his PhD from Ohio State University. He taught elementary, junior high and high school in rural Michigan, and was an elementary school principal. He also taught at Ohio State University and trained numerous future teachers of literature before he was hired by Teachers College, Columbia University in 1952, from which he retired with the rank of professor emeritus. During 22 years on the faculty, Jacobs developed literature as a major part of early education. He encouraged pupils to read literature for their own development. He wrote and edited many books and articles on language arts, reading and teaching pupils.

After retirement, he lectured regularly at colleges and schools of education. He died from heart failure in 1992 in Englewood, New Jersey.

== Works ==
The Read-It-Yourself Storybook, Just Around The Corner, Is Somewhere Always Far Away?: Poems about Places, Belling the Cat and Other Stories, Hello, Year!, Adventure Lands, Poetry for Winter, I Don't, I Do, Merry-Go-Round, Goodnight Mr. Beetle
