= REFORMA =

Library services organization (founded 1971)

REFORMA: The National Association to Promote Library & Information Services to Latinos and the Spanish Speaking
- Abbreviation: REFORMA
- Formation: 1971; 55 years ago
- Founders: Arnulfo Trejo and Elizabeth Martinez
- Website: www.reforma.org

REFORMA: The National Association to Promote Library & Information Services to Latinos and the Spanish Speaking, more commonly known as REFORMA, is an affiliate of the American Library Association formed in 1971 to promote library services to Latinos and the Spanish-speaking. It is registered in Washington, D.C. as a 501(c)(3) nonprofit organization.

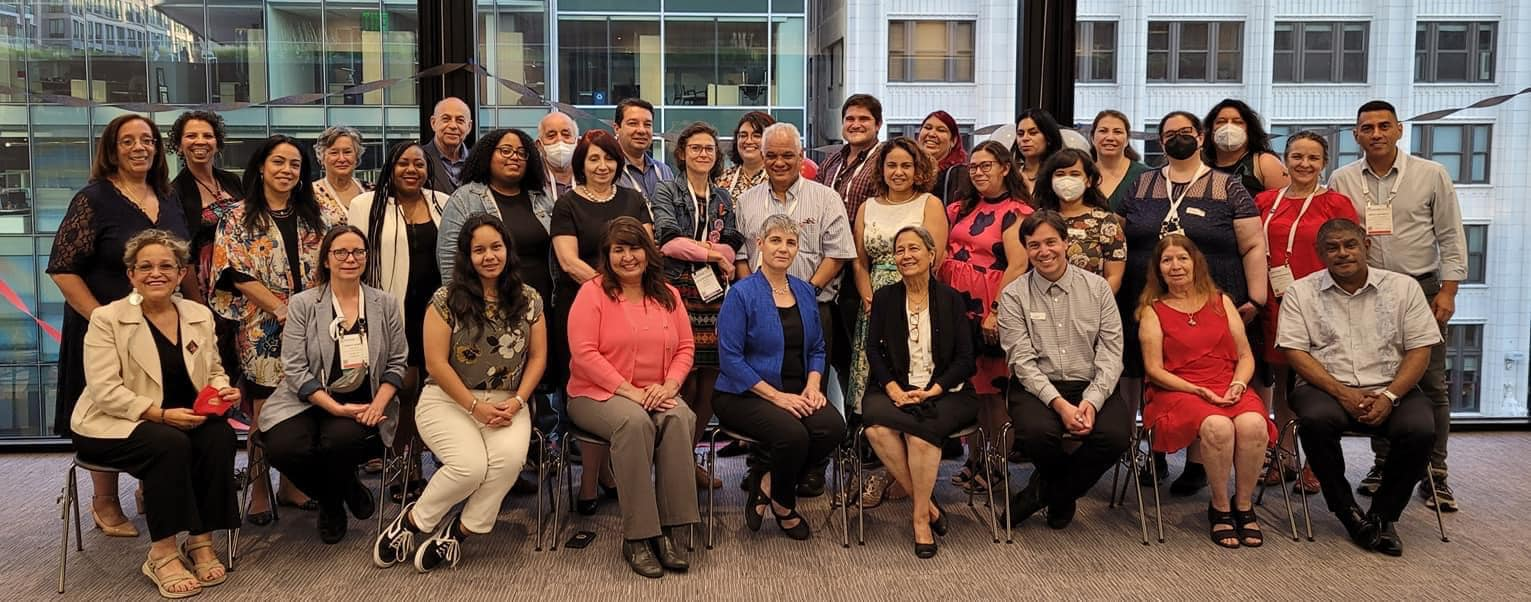
REFORMA Gala 2022

== History ==
Before the mid-1950s, there was very limited recognition of the Latino community within U.S. librarianship. By the 1960s, however, the need for information sources for the increasing Spanish-speaking population became more apparent, and some federal funding materialized for libraries to address this need. However, the mainstream profession and its associations remained indifferent to the Latino community, so Latino librarians developed a grassroots movement.

1968 saw the formation of the committee to Recruit Mexican American Librarians in Los Angeles, which founded a Graduate Institute for Mexican American Librarians at California State University, Fullerton. In 1972, Fullerton's Graduate Institute was joined by the Graduate Library Institute for Spanish-Speaking Americans (GLISA) at the University of Arizona. Both programs focused on recruiting Latino librarians, but were short-lived.

=== Dr. Arnulfo Trejo, Elizabeth Martinez, and REFORMA ===
The National Association of Spanish Speaking Librarians in the United States, which would later be called REFORMA, was founded in 1971 by Arnulfo Trejo and Elizabeth Martinez. In 1983, the Association's name was changed to REFORMA, the National Association to Promote Library Services to the Spanish Speaking to better reflect the goal of the association. It is now known as REFORMA: The National Association to Promote Library & Information Services to Latinos and the Spanish Speaking, or just REFORMA.

=== National REFORMA Conferences ===
REFORMA holds national conferences which were called RNCs from 1996-2021. In 2025 these were re-titled as the National REFORMA Conference (NRC).

- RNC I "Cultural Partnerships: Linking Missions and Visions." REFORMA’s 25th Anniversary and Presentation of the first Pura Belpré Award. August 22–25, 1996. Austin TX.
- RNC II "El Poder de la Palabra /The Power of Language." August 4–7, 2000. Tucson, AZ.
- RNC III "Bridging the Gaps: Juntos @ the Border."El Paso, TX. September 19–21, 2008.
- RNC IV "Elevating Latino Services to a Higher Level: Juntos in the Mile High City!" September 15–18, 2011. Denver, CO. REFORMA’s 40th Anniversary.
- RNC V “Bibliotecas sin fronteras: creando nuestro futuro / Libraries without Borders: Creating Our Future.” April 1–4, 2015. San Diego, CA.
- RNC VI (San Juan, Puerto Rico-cancelled due to Hurricane Maria)
- RNC VII, "Somos el cambio / We Are the Change." Virtual, November 4–7, 2021.REFORMA’s 50th Anniversary.
- NRC VIII, "Moving Forward Together: Empowering the Latino Community." September 18–21, 2025. Long Beach, CA.

NRC IX will be in 2027 in Denver, CO.

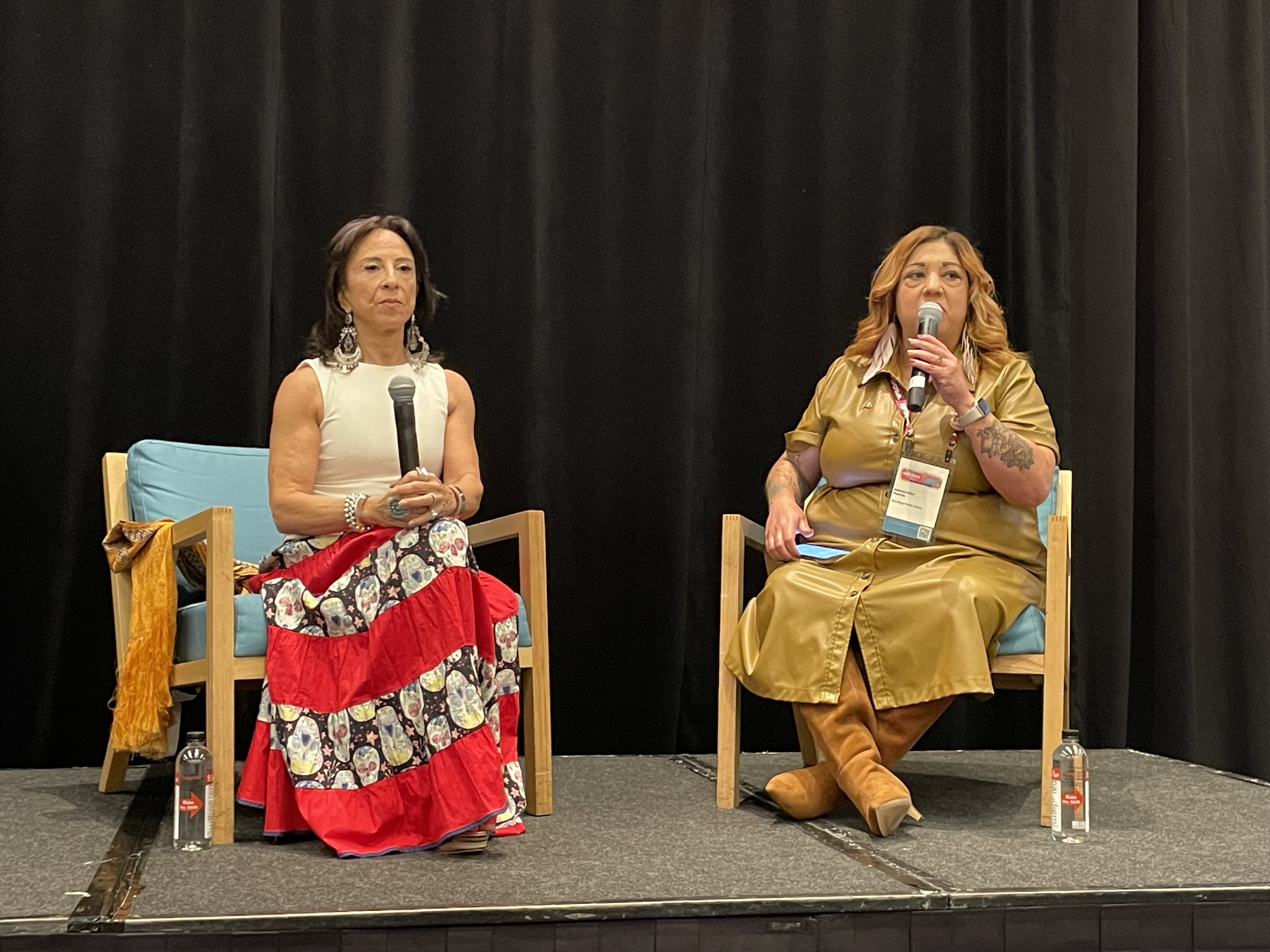
Journalist Maria Hinojosa, keynote speaker at REFORMA National Conference VIII and REFORMA President Ady Huertas

=== REFORMA Highlights ===
In 1985 Susan Luévano-Molina became the first female president of REFORMA.

In 2006, REFORMA took part in the first Joint Conference of Librarians of Color, along with the American Indian Library Association, the Asian Pacific American Librarians Association, the Black Caucus of the American Library Association, the Chinese American Librarians Association. This conference was the first national conference sponsored and held by those organizations, which are known as the Associations of Ethnic Librarians.

The Joint Council of Librarians of Color (JCLC, Inc.) was founded in June 2015 as an organization “that advocates for and addresses the common needs of the American Library Association ethnic affiliates“; these ethnic affiliates include REFORMA, as well as the American Indian Library Association, the Asian Pacific American Librarians Association, the Black Caucus of the American Library Association, and the Chinese American Librarians Association. The history of the collaboration between the associations and their leadership culinating in the National Associations of Librarians of Color has been wriiten by Long.

In 2019 the Eric Carle Museum of Picture Book Art presented its Angel award to REFORMA for its work to support refugee and immigrant children, the Pura Belpré Award, and development of library collections to include Spanish-language and Latinx-oriented materials.

=== 50th Anniversary ===
REFORMA celebrated 50 years with a virtual conference:Somos el cambio / We Are the Change November 4–7, 2021. This was also RNC VII. Proceedings of the 50th anniversary conference included presentations on "Increasing Black, Indigenous, (and) People of Color (BIPOC) Voices at Conferences and Workshops;" "La Biblioteca is for Everyone: Using Collections and Programs to Build Connections with Your Spanish Speakers;" "One Book Sin Fronteras: Conectando Comunidades Locales y Transfronterizas Mediante Múltiples Expresiones de la Lectura;" "Pura Belpré Award 101: From Volunteer Forms to Celebración;" and "Telling Our Stories and Voices for Equity: Recruitment and Retention of BIPOC Library Workers."

The 2021 Alice G. Smith Lecture "Changing the Face of Librarianship: REFORMA and Library Services to Latino Communities" presented by Lucia M. Gonzalez and Alicia K. Long at the University of South Florida, School of Information was a 50-year assessment of the impact of REFORMA.

"REFORMA's Legacy: the First 50 Years," a documentary produced by Mario A. Ascencio and Carlos Rodriguez for REFORMA's 50th Anniversary includes interviews with REFORMA's founders and leaders including Elizabeth Martinez, John Ayala, Roberto Trujillo, Cesar Caballero, Luis Herrera, Albert J. Milo, Sandra Rios Balderrama, Roxana Benavides, Lucia M. Gonzalez, Tess Tobin, Romelia Salinas and Nicanor Diaz.

== Governing Structure ==
REFORMA is governed by the Board of Directors, composed of the executive committee, the Chairs of Standing Committees, the Chapter Presidents, and any other person/office designated by the Board.

== Activities ==
REFORMA's activities include promoting the collection of Spanish-language materials in libraries; advocating the recruitment of Latinos to work in libraries in order to better serve the Latino population, educating Latinos about the services public libraries offer; promoting library programs that benefit Latinos. REFORMA also serves as a network of librarians who share these interests.

Many of REFORMA's activities are pursued within twenty regional and local chapters, which operate autonomously to achieve the association's goals in local libraries and communities. National activities include a scholarship drive which funds graduate education in librarianship for students sharing REFORMA's goals and the publication of a biannual newsletter. Over the years, REFORMA has also taken positions and become involved in political issues concerning Latino communities in the United States, especially issues that affect reading and library services. Examples are: Position on Language Rights; Resolution in Support of Immigrants' Rights to Free Public Library Access; Resolution Opposing Sensenbrenner Bill (H.R. 4437); and Statement Regarding Censorship of Children's Book (in Florida).

== REFORMA Research Committee ==
The REFORMA Research Committee examines current trends, statistics, research, best practices and information on programming and services related to serving Latino and Spanish-speaking communities in libraries (Academic, Public, School or Special). The Research Committee produces a biannual report of trends to serve as a resource for members to access and learn about successful models/programs to replicate and serve their communities. The committee's first report, Brown Paper: Library Projects/Programs that Serve Latinx and Spanish-Speaking Communities. was published in 2023.

== Awards and Scholarships ==
REFORMA has provided scholarships to graduate library school students who plan to work with the Latino community since the early 1980s.

REFORMA grants four awards:

- Trejo Librarian of the Year Award presented to a librarian who has made exemplary contributions to the library profession in service to the Latino community;
- Elizabeth Martinez Lifetime Achievement Award recognizing a librarian whose dedication to librarianship "has made significant and lasting contributions to REFORMA or on REFORMA's behalf, as well as to the Latino and Spanish-speaking community";
- Pat Mora Award presented to libraries in recognition of their Día de Los Niños/Día de Los Libros (Children's Day/Book Day) activities;
- Pura Belpré Award given to a Latino/Latina writer and illustrator for excellence in Latino literature for children and youth.

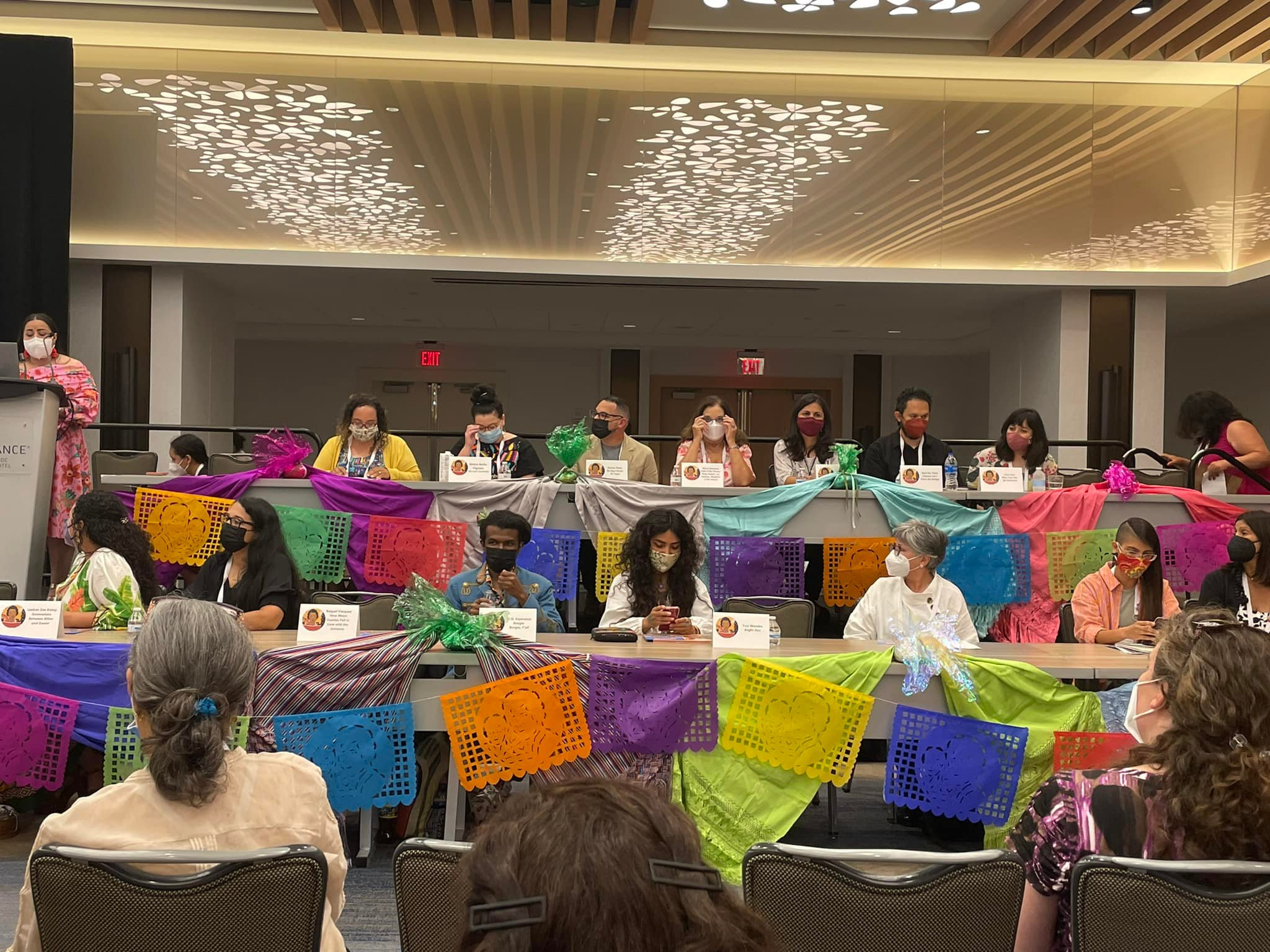
Pura Belpré Celebración 2022 at ALA Annual Conference

The Rose Treviño Memorial Scholarship is open to Latinos and/or Spanish speakers pursuing a degree in children and young adult librarianship, and the REFORMA Scholarship is open to students who qualify for graduate study in Library and Information Science who are Spanish-speakers or interested in serving Latinos or the Spanish-speaking.

== Presidents ==
The Presidency of REFORMA is currently a position that is held for three years, including one as Vice President/President-Elect and one as Past President. Past and current presidents:

- Edwin Rodarte (2026-2027)
- Adriana (Ady) Huertas (2025-2026)
- Alexandra Rivera (2024-2025)
- David Lopez (2023–2024)
- Romelia Salinas (2022–2023)
- Nicanor Diaz (2021–2022)
- Oscar Baeza (2020–2021)
- Kenny Garcia (2019–2020)
- Madeline Peña (2018–2019)
- Tess Tobin (2017–2018)
- Selina Gomez-Beloz (2016–2017)
- Beatriz Guevara (2015–2016)
- Silvia Cisneros (2014–2015)
- Isabel Espinal (2013–2014)
- Denice Adkins (2012–2013)
- Maria Kramer (2011–2012)
- Lucia M. Gonzalez (2010–2011)
- Loida Garcia-Febo (2009–2010)
- Luis Chaparro (2008–2009)
- Mario Ascencio (2007–2008)
- Roxana Benavides (2006–2007)
- Ana-Elba Pavón (2005–2006)
- José Ruiz Álvarez (2004–2005)
- Linda Chavez Doyle (2003–2004)
- Ben Ocón (2002–2003)
- Susana Hinojosa (2001–2002)
- Oralia Garza de Cortes (2000–2001)
- Toni Bissessar (1999–2000)
- Jacqueline Ayala (1998–1999)
- Sandra Ríos Balderrama (1997–1998)
- Edward Erazo (1996–1997)
- Judith Castiano (1995–1996)
- Gilda Baeza Ortego (1994–1995)
- Camila Alire (1993–1994)
- Martín Gómez (1992–1993)
- Mario González (1991–1992)
- Ron Rodríguez (1990–1991)
- Rhonda Ríos-Kravitz (1989–1990)
- Ingrid Betancourt (1988–1989)
- Elizabeth Rodriguez-Miller (1987–1988)
- Elena Tscherny (1986–1987)
- Susan Luévano-Molina (1985–1986)
- Salvador Güereña (1984–1985)
- Albert A. Milo (1983–1984)
- Luis Herrera (1982–1983)
- Cesar Caballero (1980–1982)
- Daniel Flores Durán (1978–1980)
- Roberto Cabello Argandoña (1977–1978)
- José G. Taylor (1976–1977)
- John Ayala (1974–1976)
- Alberto Irabian (1974–1974)
- Arnulfo Trejo (1971–1974)

== See also ==
- List of libraries in the United States
