= Association for Library Service to Children =

American library association

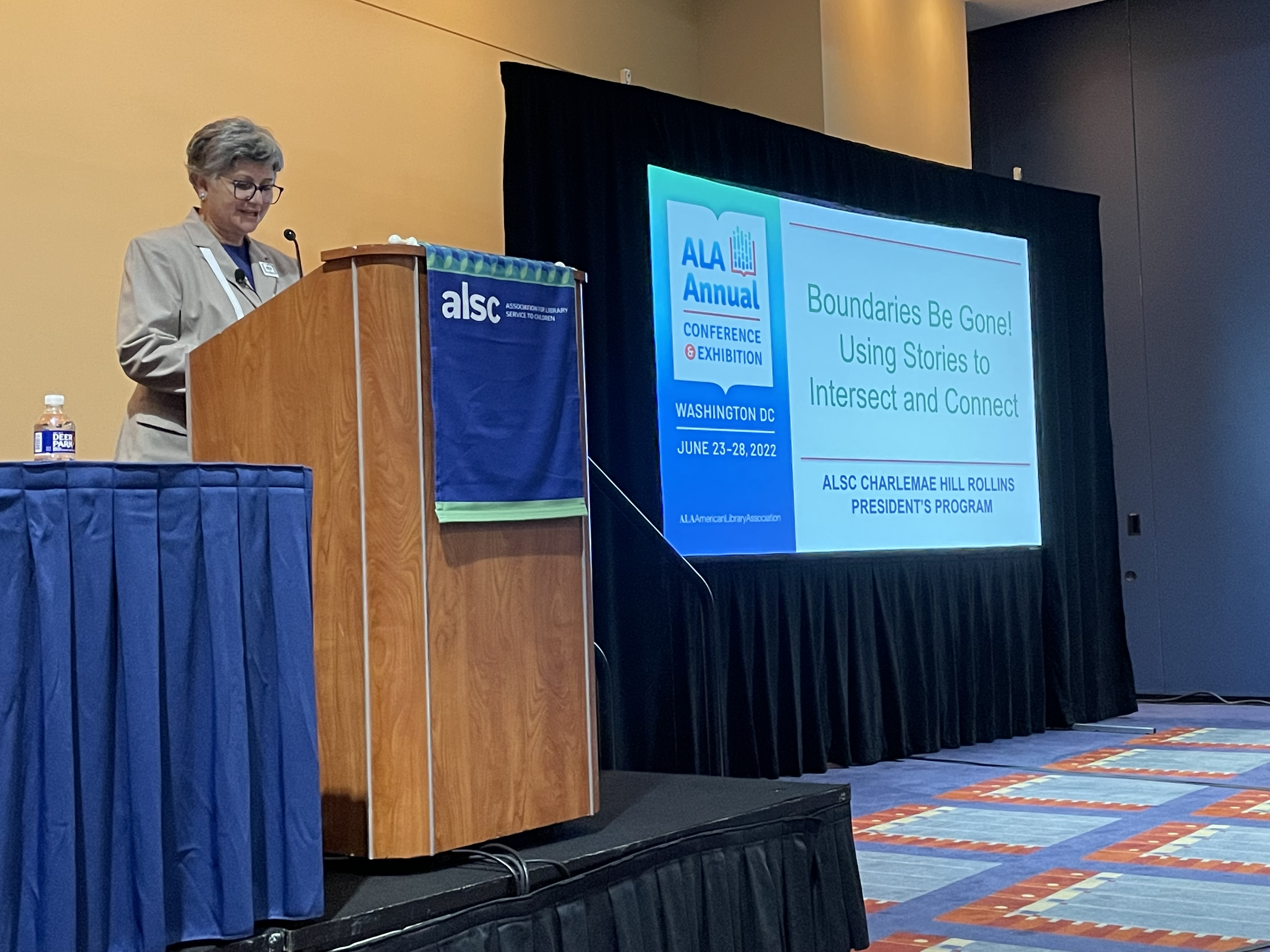
- 2022 ALSC President's Program with former president Lucia M. Gonzalez
- Location: Chicago, Illinois, United States
- President: Ariana Augustine Sani Hussain
- Vice President: Danielle Jones

The Association for Library Service to Children (ALSC) is a division of the American Library Association.

ALSC has over 4,000 members, including children, experts in children's literature, publishers, faculty members, and other adults. The Association has nearly 60 active committees and task forces, including programs for youth, publishing resources and journals, evaluating and awarding media for children.

ALSC sets standards for library services to children through regular updates to its "Competencies for Librarians Serving Children in Public Libraries." The most recent competencies which was adopted in 2015, emphasized seven core areas of competence, including; services, programs, outreach, collection development, and administrative practices.

== Media mentorship ==
In 2015, the ALSC Board accepted a white paper titled "Media Mentorship in Libraries Serving Youth". This paper outlines the role of librarians and other library staff who serve youth and families with particular regard to materials and practices surrounding digital media.

=== Journal ===
ALSC published a triannual peer-reviewed academic journal, Children and Libraries, covering library services to children. The journal was established in 2003 and succeeds the Journal of Youth Services (formerly Top of the News), which was published until 2002 in collaboration with the Young Adult Library Services Association.

== Awards, grants, and scholarships ==
=== Book and media awards ===
ALSC announces the awards listed below every January at a Monday morning press conference that takes place during the American Library Association Midwinter Meeting.

- The Newbery Medal was named for eighteenth-century British bookseller John Newbery. It is awarded annually to the author to American literature for children.
- The Caldecott Medal was named in honor of nineteenth-century English illustrator Randolph Caldecott. It is awarded annually to the artist of an American picture book for children.
- The Batchelder Award was named in honor of twentieth-century American librarian Mildred L. Batchelder who served as chief of ALA's School and Children’s Library Division and, through successive reorganizations, served as executive secretary of the divisions concerned with children’s and young adult services until her retirement. The Batchelder Award explicitly references a given work, its translator and author. It seeks to recognize translations of children's books into the English language, with the intention of encouraging American publishers to translate high quality foreign language children's books and "promote communication between the people of the world".
- The Belpré Medal was named in honor of twentieth-century Puerto Rican librarian Pura Belpré. It is given in honor to a Latino or Latina writer and illustrator whose works "best portray, affirm, and celebrate the Latino cultural experience". It has been given every other year since 1996. Beginning with the 2009 award, it will be given annually.
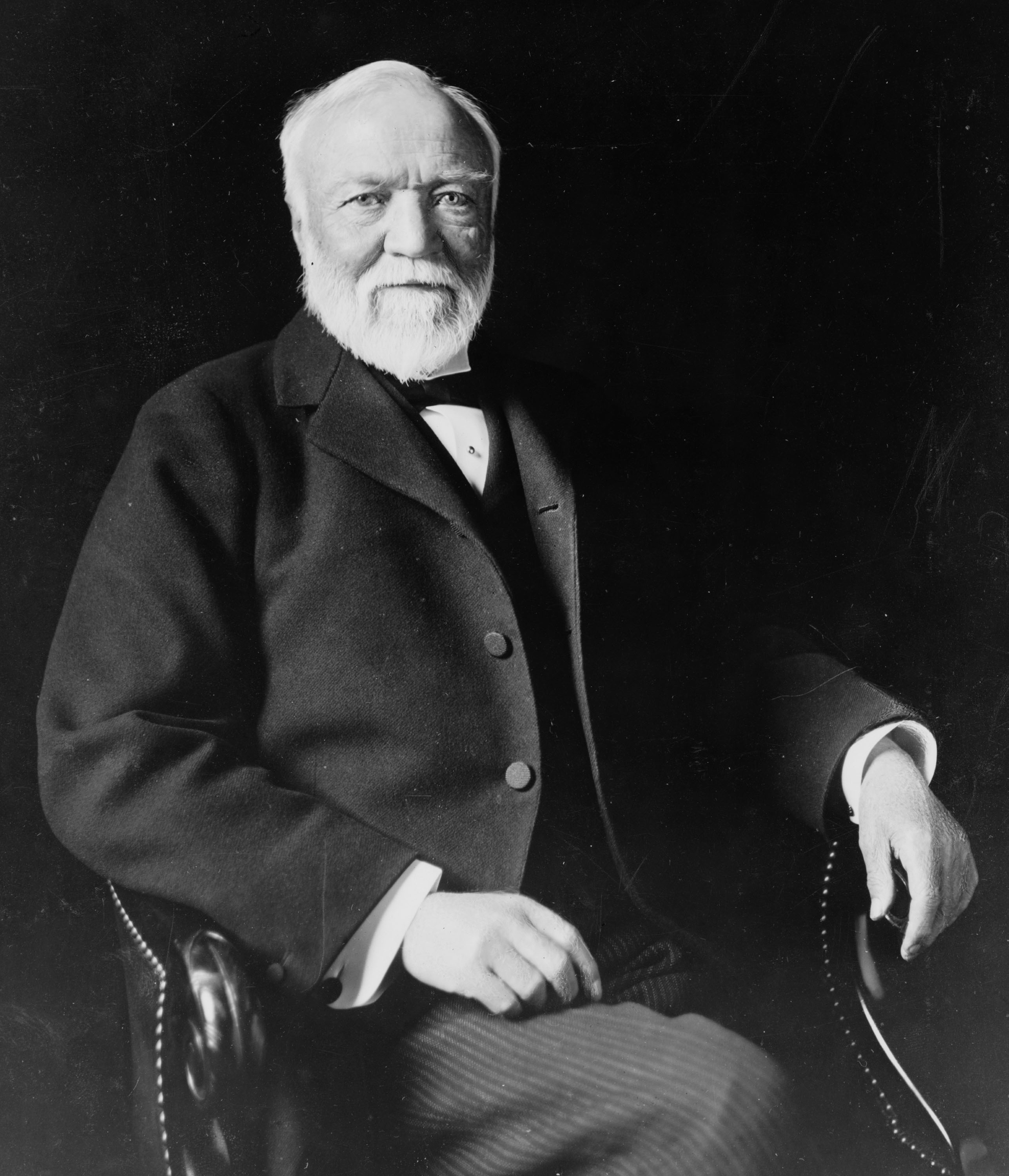
- Andrew Carnegie, American philanthropist
  The Carnegie Medal was named in honor of nineteenth-century American philanthropist Andrew Carnegie. It honors the producer of video production for children.
- The Children's Literature Lecture Award (formerly called the "May Hill Arbuthnot Lecture Award from 1970–2020), was originally named in honor of twentieth-century American educator May Hill Arbuthnot. It is awarded annually to honor an author, critic, librarian, historian, or teacher of children's literature paper considered to be a significant contribution to the field of children's literature. This paper is delivered as a lecture each year, and is subsequently published in Children and Libraries, the journal of ALSC.
- The Geisel Award was named in honor of twentieth-century American author Theodor Seuss Geisel. It is given annually to the author(s) and illustrator(s) of American book for beginning readers published in English in the United States during the preceding year.
- The Odyssey Award was named in honor of the Homer's eighth century BC epic poem. The Odyssey Award is jointly given and administered by the ALSC and the Young Adult Library Services Association (YALSA), another division of the ALA. It is sponsored by Booklist magazine, a publication of the ALA.
- The Sibert Medal was named in honor of twentieth-century American publisher Robert F. Sibert. It honors the author(s) and illustrator(s) of the most distinguished informational book.
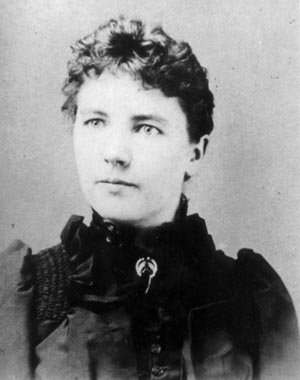
- Laura Ingalls Wilder, American author
  The Children's Literature Legacy Award (previously named the Wilder Medal) was originally named in honor of twentieth-century American author Laura Ingalls Wilder but the name was changed in 2018. It honors an author or illustrator whose books, published in the United States, have made, over a period of years, a substantial and lasting contribution to literature for children.

=== Children's notable lists ===
In addition to the above listed awards, ALSC produces three lists of notable annual media titles:

- Notable Children's Books
- Notable Children's Recordings
- Notable Children's Digital Media

ALSC formerly produced the Notable Children's Videos list

=== Partnership grants ===
- Dollar General Literacy Foundation
- Disney

ALSC also ran Great Websites for Kids, a compilation of exemplary websites geared to children from birth to age 14. Suggested sites were evaluated by the Great Websites for Kids Committee using established selection criteria. The Great Websites for Kids program ended in 2016.

== See also ==
- Young Adult Library Services Association (YALSA)
- List of libraries in the United States
