= Blanche Fisher Wright =

American children's book illustrator

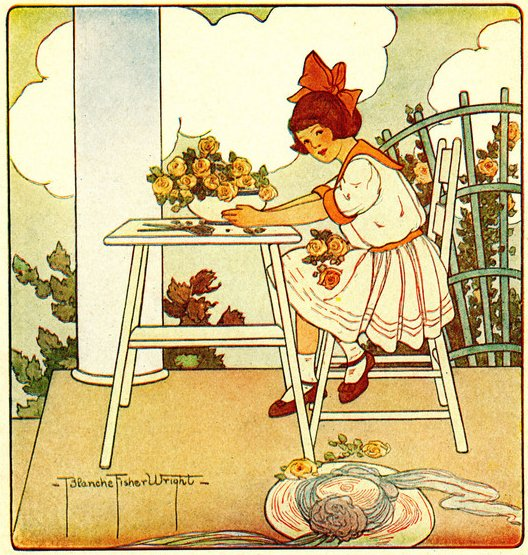
Blanche Fisher Wright illustration from the 1913 The Goody-Naughty Book

Blanche Fisher Wright Laite (1887 – 1971) was an American children's book illustrator active in the 1910s. She is best known for illustrating The Real Mother Goose, published in 1916 by Rand McNally.

She married actor Charles Laite and in 1925 they fostered Gordon Laite who became a children's book illustrator in the 1960s and 1970s.

== Illustrated Works ==
- The Goody-Naughty Book, by Sarah Cory Rippey (Rand McNally, 1913)
- The Real Mother Goose (Rand McNally & Co., 1916)
- The Natural Method Readers: A Second Reader, by Hannah T. McManus and John H. Haaren (C. Scribner's Sons, 1915)
- The Natural Method Readers: A Third Reader, by Hannah T. McManus and John H. Haaren (C. Scribner's Sons, 1916)
- The Natural Method Readers: A Fourth Reader, by Hannah T. McManus and John H. Haaren (C. Scribner's Sons, 1917)
- The Peter Patter Book of Nursery Rhymes, by Leroy F. Jackson (Rand McNally & Co, 1918)
- Tommy Snooks and Other Mother Goose Rhymes (Rand McNally & Co., c. 1916)

As Blanche Fisher Laite

- Everychild: A Story Which the Old May Interpret to the Young and Which the Young May Interpret to the Old, by Louis Dodge (C. Scribner's Sons, 1921)
- A Journey to Health Land, by J. Mace Andress and Annie Turner Andress (Ginn & Co., 1924)
