= General Moore =

General Moore may refer to:

== United Kingdom ==
- Alexander George Montgomery Moore (1833–1919), British Army general
- Arthur Thomas Moore (1830–1913), Bombay Army major general
- Claude Moore (1875–1928), British Army major general
- Jeremy Moore (1928–2007), Royal Marine major general
- John Moore (British Army officer) (1761–1809), British Army lieutenant general
- Rodney Moore (British Army officer) (1905–1985), British Army general
- William Moore (British Army officer) (born 1958), British Army major general
- Charles Moore, 1st Marquess of Drogheda (1730–1822), British Army general

== United States ==
- Andrew Moore (politician) (1752–1821), Virginia Militia major general
- Bryant Moore (1894–1951), U.S. Army major general
- C. D. Moore (born 1958), U.S. Air Force lieutenant general
- Charles L. Moore (fl. 1980s–2020s), U.S. Air Force lieutenant general
- George F. Moore (United States Army officer) (1887–1949), U.S. Army major general
- Hal Moore (1922–2017), U.S. Army lieutenant general
- J. Vreeland Moore (1824–1903), New Jersey Regiment brevet brigadier general in the American Civil War
- James Moore (Continental Army officer) (c. 1737–c. 1777), Continental Army general
- James T. Moore (USMC) (1895–1953), U.S. Marine Corps lieutenant general
- James Edward Moore (1902–1986), U.S. Army four-star general
- John Moore (physician) (1826–1907), Union Army brigadier general and Surgeon General of the Army
- John Creed Moore (1824–1910), Confederate States Army brigadier general
- Joseph Harold Moore (1914–2006), U.S. Air Force lieutenant general
- Patrick Theodore Moore (1821–1883), Confederate States Army brigadier general
- Richard G. Moore (fl. 1990s–2020s), U.S. Air Force major general
- Robert Scurlark Moore (1895–1978), U.S. Army major general
- Royal N. Moore Jr. (born 1935), U.S. Marine Corps major general
- Samuel P. Moore (1813–1889), Confederate States Army brigadier general
- Sydenham Moore (1817–1862), Alabama Militia brigadier general
- Thomas Moore (South Carolina congressman) (1759–1822), U.S. Army brigadier general
- Todd R. Moore (born c. 1974), U.S. Space Force brigadier general
- William G. Moore Jr. (1920–2012), U.S. Air Force four-star general
- William C. Moore (born 1929), U.S. Army major general

== Other ==
- Michael Moore (Swedish officer) (born 1953), Swedish Air Force major general
- Newton Moore (1870–1936), Australian Imperial Forces major general

== See also ==
- John Moore-Bick (born 1949), British Army major general
- Attorney General Moore (disambiguation)
