= Clara Elsene Peck =

20th-century American illustrator and painter

- Born: April 18, 1883; Allegan, Michigan, U.S.
- Died: February 1968 (aged 84); Gettysburg, Pennsylvania, U.S.
- Education: Minneapolis School of Fine Arts; Pennsylvania Academy of Fine Arts; William Merritt Chase
- Known for: Illustration; painting; watercolor; etching
- Notable work: Illustrations/decorations for Shakespeare's Sweetheart (1905), A Lady of King Arthur's Court (1907), both by Sara Hawks Sterling; and In the Border Country, (1909) by Josephine Daskam Bacon
- Movement: American Impressionism
- Awards: New York Association of Women Painters and Sculptors, Prize, 1920, 1921

Signature
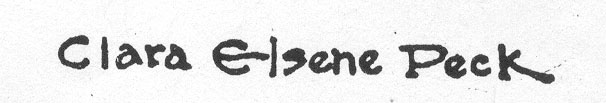

Clara Elsene Peck (April 18, 1883 – February 1968) was an American illustrator and painter known for her illustrations of women and children in the early 20th century. Peck received her arts education from the Minneapolis School of Fine Arts and was employed as a magazine illustrator from 1906 to 1940. Peck's body of work encompasses a wide range, from popular women's magazines and children's books, works of fiction, commercial art for products like Ivory soap, and comic books and watercolor painting later in her career. Peck worked during the "Golden Age of American Illustration" (1880s–1930s) contemporaneous with noted female illustrators Jessie Willcox Smith, Elizabeth Shippen Green and Violet Oakley.

Peck's work appeared in exhibitions from the Art Institute of Chicago to the Pennsylvania Academy of the Fine Arts, and she received awards from the New York Association of Women Painters and Sculptors in the 1920s. Peck resided in an art colony in Leonia, New Jersey, with her collaborator and husband, artist John Scott Williams. In the 1940s, Peck contributed to Catholic comic books distributed to parochial schools. She focused on watercolor painting in the 1950s and her work was exhibited in Europe and the United States. Her most notable illustrations and artwork were published in three books early in her career: Shakespeare's Sweetheart (1905), A Lady of King Arthur's Court (1907), and In the Border Country (1909).

== Early life ==
Clara Elsene Peck was born in Allegan, Michigan on April 18, 1883. Peck spent her youth in St. Paul, Minnesota and later studied art at the Minneapolis School of Fine Arts. She took classes at the Pennsylvania Academy of Fine Arts where she studied under American Impressionist painter and teacher William Merritt Chase. Reminiscing about her early years, Peck said: "With me the desire to become an artist has been strong since childhood. Other members of the family in previous generations were artists, making the love and joy in creative expression a natural one to me."

== Marriage and later life ==
A collaborative illustration with John Scott Williams

In 1906, Peck married British-born illustrator John Scott Williams (1877–1975), and they produced two children together, Aynard and Conway. Peck and Williams shared similar styles, leading the two to occasionally collaborate on illustrations together. These works were signed with the first initials of their last names, "P W". Some of Peck's works are also credited as Clara Elsene Williams and the press sometimes referred to her as "Mrs. John Scott Williams".

After illustrator Harvey Dunn founded the Leonia School of Illustration in Leonia, New Jersey in 1915, Peck and Williams moved to an artist colony in Leonia, joining a group of about 90 professional artists.

They lived in a house originally built by artist Charles Harry Eaton (American, 1850–1901) on Crescent Avenue and were neighbors with artist-couple John Rutherford Boyd (1882–1951) and Harriet Repplier Boyd. The Boyds' house became a community center of artistic gatherings where many of Leonia's artists exhibited their works. The marriage between Peck and Williams came to an end, and J. Scott Williams remarried in 1930.

Peck later resided in Brooklyn, New York and Gettysburg, Pennsylvania. Towards the end of her life, art historian Helen Teri Caro located Peck and acquired over 100 pieces of her artwork on behalf of the Glenbow Museum in Calgary, Alberta. Peck died in Gettysburg in February 1968.

== Career ==
=== Illustration ===
Peck's career in illustration began in the early 1900s with her work for publisher George W. Jacobs in Philadelphia, Pennsylvania. This was a period when technological innovations in halftone and color printing engendered the "Golden Age of Illustration". In addition to illustrations, Peck created decorations and lettering designs for books. Notable works from this period include illustrations for Sara Hawks Sterling's Shakespeare's Sweetheart (1905) and A Lady of King Arthur's Court (1907), and Josephine Daskam Bacon's In the Border Country (1909). Peck eventually illustrated at least four additional books by Bacon.

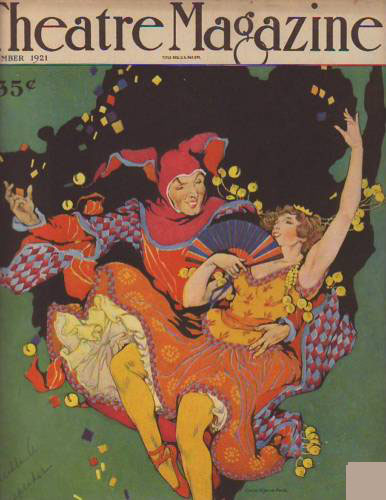
Cover for Theatre Magazine, November 1921

By 1908, Peck had designed her first cover for Collier's. Peck began illustrating women's magazines during the 1910s and 1920s, contributing to Cosmopolitan, Good Housekeeping, Ladies Home Journal, Today's Housewife, and Household Magazine. Peck's magazine illustrations appeared in St. Nicholas Magazine, The Century Magazine, The Delineator, the Pictorial Review, and The Youth's Companion. She contributed several cover illustrations to Theatre Magazine in the early 1920s and worked as a commercial artist on advertising campaigns for companies such as Procter & Gamble, Metropolitan Life, the Aeolian Company, and Ivory Soap. Peck also illustrated educational books, educational certificates, sheet music, fiction, and fairy tales.

Women and children in Peck's work were depicted with great sensitivity in a wide variety of roles and responsibilities. Art historian and illustrator Walt Reed describes Peck's style as "decorative in composition and sensitive in rendering". Artistic themes found in Peck's work include education, child psychology, and the expectant mother. The decorative style of the period was popularized by seminal American illustrator Howard Pyle and his female students. According to Elizabeth H. Hawkes, curator emeritus of the Delaware Art Museum, the style consisted of "using flat, brightly colored figures boldly outlined and placed against a patterned background. They incorporated elements of the popular 1890s poster style and borrowed motifs from Walter Crane, Kate Greenaway, and the English Arts and Crafts movement style of illustration."

Peck's career in illustration was active from the "Golden Age of American Illustration" through the onset of the Great Depression when the careers of illustrators suffered due to the poor economy. The output of magazine illustrations from Peck continued until at least 1935.

=== Cartooning ===
"Waiting Winter Storage", oil/canvasboard, (c. 1950)

In the 1940s, Peck worked as a cartoonist for Topix Comics and Treasure Chest, a series of Catholic-themed comic books. Topix Comics was launched in 1942 and produced in Saint Paul, Minnesota. The comic book featured stories of courageous Christians, Saints, and Biblical narratives, and by 1946, it had a circulation of over 600,000. Peck's work was distributed exclusively in parochial schools and appeared throughout most of the title's nine-year run. She also provided material for early issues of the similarly themed Treasure Chest title, including a few episodes of "The Robinson's Rumpus Room" feature and the cover for Volume 2, Number 9 in 1946.

=== Painting ===
Peck participated in several exhibitions in the 1950s, beginning with the American Watercolor Society. From 1956 to 1957, Peck was part of the Metropolitan Museum of Art's European traveling exhibition; In 1958, Peck's work appeared at the Washington County Museum of Art, in a solo exhibition at Gettysburg College, at the York Art Center, and in New Canaan, Connecticut. The Brandywine River Museum and the Delaware Art Museum host her paintings. Since 2000, a few of her landscape and portrait oil paintings have been recorded as sold at various auction houses.

== Awards and distinctions ==
Peck was a member of several art associations, including the American Watercolor Society (1931–1967), the National Association of Women Painters and Sculptors, National Association of Women Artists, the New York Watercolor Society and the Society of Illustrators. Along with Florence Scovel Shinn, Rose O'Neill and others, Peck was one of the first 20 women to become a member of the Society of Illustrators by 1922, representing about 10% of the total membership. In 1913, Peck's work was featured in exhibitions at the Art Institute of Chicago and the Pennsylvania Academy of Fine Arts, and at the National Association of Women Artists and the New York Association of Women Painters and Sculptors where she won awards in 1920 and 1921. Posthumously, Peck's works were featured in the seminal 1976 New York exhibition, 200 Years of American Illustration; In 1985 at the America's Great Women Illustrators 1850–1950 exhibition in New York; And, in 1986, at the American Illustration 1890–1925 exhibition held in Calgary.

== Selected illustrated books ==
- Phases, Mazes and crazes of love. By Minna Thomas Antrim. Philadelphia: George W. Jacobs and Company, 1904.
- Knocks, Witty Wise and ____. By Minna Thomas Antrim. Philadelphia: George W. Jacobs and Company, 1905.
- Shakespeare's Sweetheart. By Sara Hawks Sterling. Philadelphia: George W. Jacobs & Co, 1905.
- A Lady of King Arthur's Court. By Sara Hawks Sterling. Philadelphia: George W Jacobs and Co., 1907.
- In the Border Country. By Josephine Daskam Bacon. New York: Doubleday Page, 1909.
- The Hallowell Partnership. By Katharine Holland Brown. New York: Charles Scribner's Sons, 1912.
- The Prince of Mercuria. By Atkinson Kimball. New York: Heart's International Library Co., 1914.
- The Diary of an Expectant Mother. By Charlotte Hirsch. Chicago: A.C. McClurg, 1917.

== Gallery ==
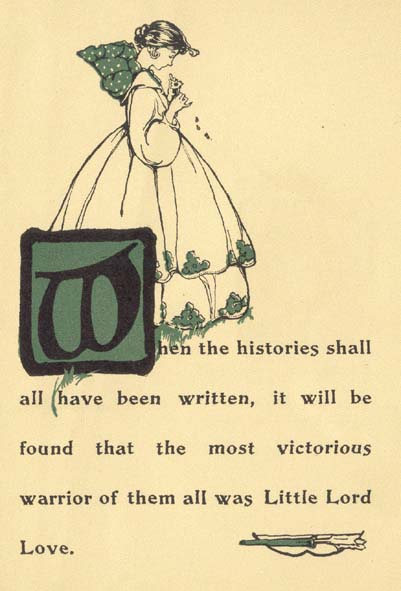
An early illustration from Phases, Mazes and Crazes of Love (1904)

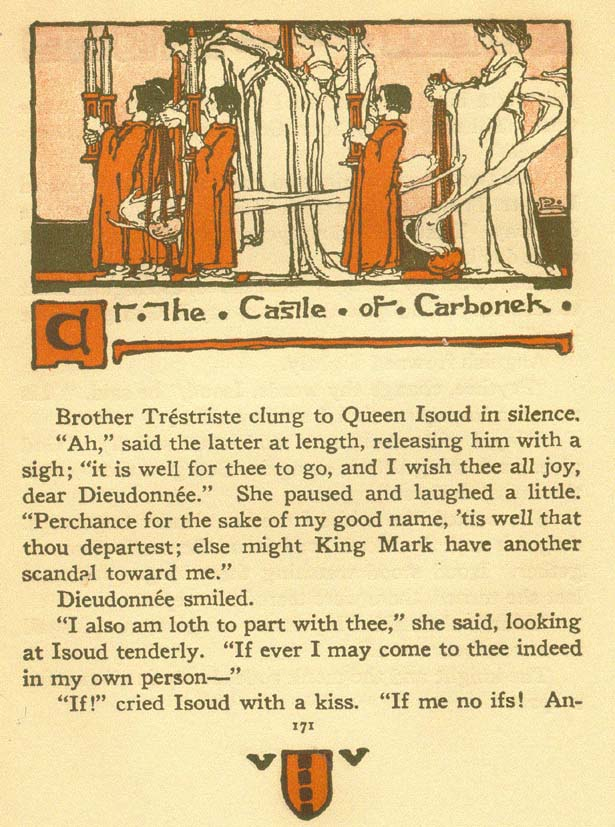
A Lady of King Arthur's Court (1907)

A Lady of King Arthur's Court (1907)

Cover to Collier's (October 3, 1908)

Illustration from Scribner's Magazine (1915)

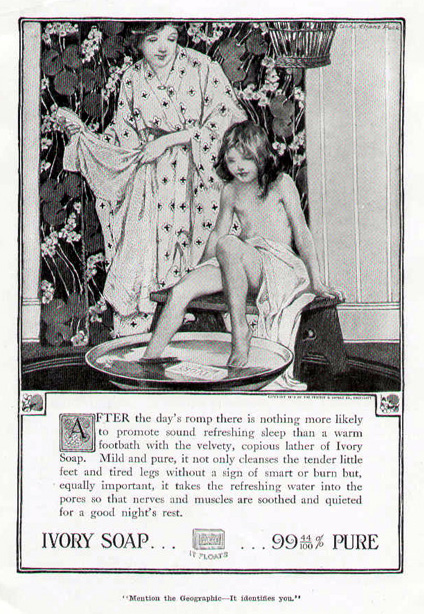
Advertisement for Ivory Soap (1918)

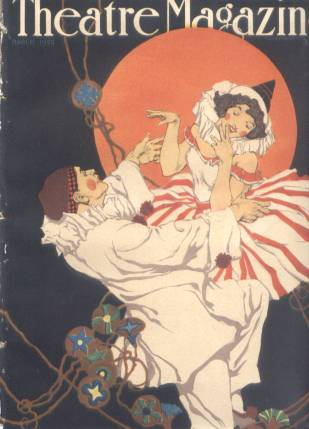
Illustrated cover for Theatre Magazine (1922)

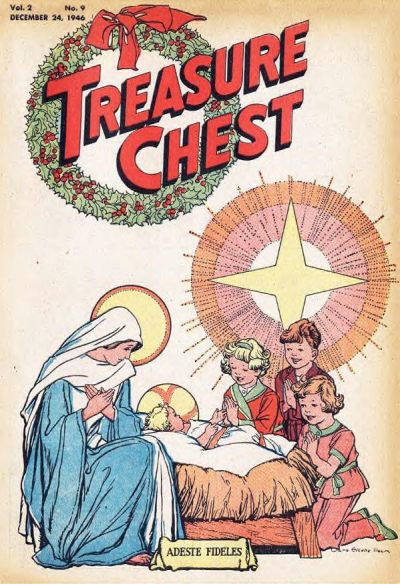
Cover to Treasure Chest (1946)

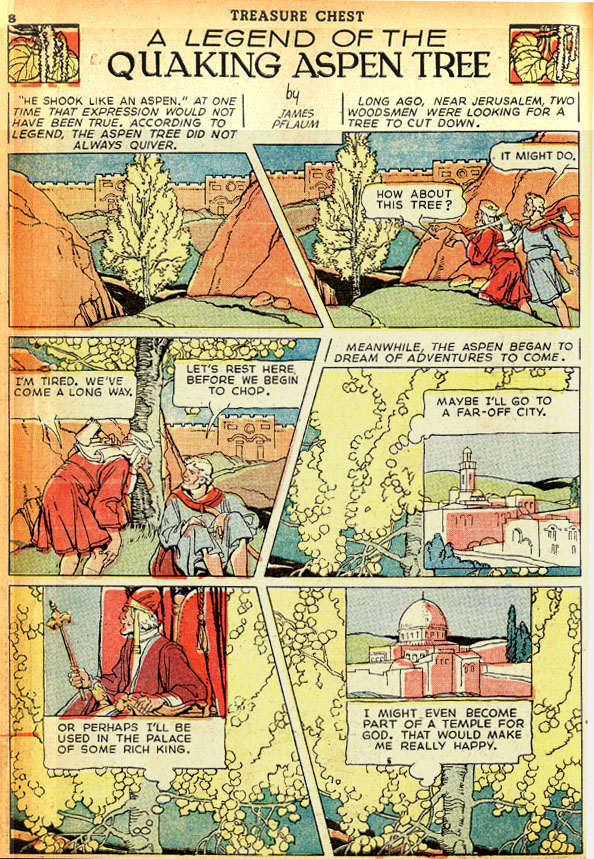
A page from Treasure Chest (1947)
