= Conrad Schwiering =

American painter

- Born: August 8, 1916; Boulder, Colorado, U.S.
- Died: January 27, 1986 (aged 69); Monterey, California, U.S.
- Education: University of Wyoming; Art Students League of New York
- Occupation: Painter
- Spouse: Mary Ethel Smith

Conrad Schwiering, also known as Connie Schwiering, (August 8, 1916 - January 27, 1986) was an American landscape painter from Wyoming.

== Early life ==
Schwiering was born on August 8, 1916, in Boulder, Colorado. He was educated in Laramie, Wyoming, where his father was the dean of the College of Education at the University of Wyoming.

Schwiering attended the University of Wyoming as a member of Sigma Nu and the Reserve Officers' Training Corps. He graduated with a bachelor's degree in business in 1938. He studied under Charles Shepard Chapman at the Art Students League of New York in New York City in 1941, and served in the United States Army during World War II until 1946.

== Career ==
Schwiering became a painter in Jackson Hole, Wyoming in 1947, and he opened a gallery in the Wort Hotel the following year. One of his mentors was Clifford Hansen, who subsequently served as the governor of Wyoming. Schwiering did paintings of Wyoming landscapes, including the Tetons. He also painted in Carmel-by-the-Sea, California, and in Mexico.

Schwiering was a regionalist, a realist, and an impressionist. His work was exhibited at the Cowboy Hall of Fame and the Gilcrease Museum in Oklahoma. Schwiering was a founding member of the National Academy of Western Art, and he appeared in Who's Who in American Art.

== Personal life and death ==
Schwiering married Mary Ethel Smith in 1939.

Schwiering died of a heart attack on January 27, 1986, in Monterey, California, at age 69. He was buried in Teton County, Wyoming.
