= Peter Mansoor =

American military officer (born 1960)

Peter R. Mansoor
- Born: February 28, 1960 (age 66)
- Military career
- Allegiance: United States of America
- Branch: United States Army
- Service years: 1982–2008
- Rank: Colonel
- Commands: 1st Brigade, 1st Armored Division (2003-2005)
- Conflicts: Iraq War: Battle of Karbala
- Other work: Military historian

Peter R. Mansoor (born February 28, 1960) is a retired United States Army officer, military historian, and commentator on national security affairs in the media. He is known primarily as the executive officer to General David Petraeus during the Iraq War, particularly the Iraq War troop surge of 2007. He is a professor at The Ohio State University, where he holds the General Raymond E. Mason Jr. Chair of Military History.

Mansoor has published two memoirs of his service in Iraq. Baghdad at Sunrise: A Brigade Commander’s War in Iraq (2008), which received the Ohioana Library Association Book of the Year award in 2009, details his service as commander of the 1st Brigade, 1st Armored Division from 2003 to 2005. Surge: My Journey with General David Petraeus and the Remaking of the Iraq War (2013), a finalist for the inaugural Guggenheim-Lehrman Prize in Military History, focuses on his service under Petraeus. He is also the author of The GI Offensive in Europe: The Triumph of American Infantry Divisions, 1941–1945 (1999), which received the Society for Military History distinguished book award and the Army Historical Foundation Distinguished Writing Award in 2000. His latest monograph, Redemption: MacArthur and the Campaign for the Philippines (2025) was awarded the Army Historical Foundation Distinguished Writing Award for biography.

In 2010, Mansoor was awarded the American Task Force on Palestine award for Distinguished National Service. In 2012 he was inducted into the Sacramento, California-based San Juan Education Foundation STARS Hall of Fame.

== Early life and education ==
Mansoor was born in New Ulm, Minnesota, to a father of Palestinian descent and a mother of German descent and was raised in Sacramento, California. Mansoor earned his B.S. at the United States Military Academy in 1982 (graduating first in his class), his M.A. in History at the Ohio State University in 1992, and his Ph.D. in History at the Ohio State University in 1995. He earned his M.S.S. in Strategic Studies at the United States Army War College in 2003. He is the valedictorian of the class of 1978 of Mira Loma High School in Sacramento, California.

== Career ==
=== Military ===
Commissioned as a second lieutenant in May 1982, Mansoor served in a variety of command and staff assignments, including postings with the 3rd Armored Cavalry Regiment at Fort Bliss, Texas; the 11th Armored Cavalry Regiment in Bad Hersfeld and Fulda, Germany; and the 11th Armored Cavalry Regiment (Opposing Forces) at the National Training Center at Fort Irwin, California. He commanded the 1st Squadron, 10th Cavalry and served as operations officer (G-3) of the 4th Infantry Division (Mechanized) at Fort Hood, Texas. In 1993–1995 he was a military history instructor at the U.S. Military Academy. He later served on the Joint Staff as the special assistant to the Director for Strategic Plans and Policy (J-5) in the United States Department of Defense, during a period that included the Bosnian peace support operation, Operation Desert Fox, and the Kosovo War. From July 2003 to July 2005, Mansoor commanded the 1st Brigade, 1st Armored Division, which was deployed in Iraq from May 2003 to July 2004.

In 2005 Mansoor became a senior military fellow at the Council on Foreign Relations in New York. He then served as the founding director of the U.S. Army/Marine Corps Counterinsurgency Center at Fort Leavenworth, Kansas. There he helped to edit FM 3-24 Counterinsurgency, published in December 2006, which was used to reshape the conduct of the Iraq War. In the fall of 2006, he served on the so-called "Council of Colonels," a task force of senior officers created by the Joint Chiefs of Staff that reexamined the strategy for the war in Iraq. During its deliberations, Mansoor advocated sending additional troops to Iraq as part of the strategy eventually known as "the Surge," albeit at a lower strength level than the option preferred by then-Colonel H. R. McMaster, another member of the Council. Mansoor termed his strategy preference the "Go Long" option. At the time he formed a minority among the Council of Colonels, most of whom opposed the idea of a troop surge.

Mansoor's military career culminated with his assignment as the executive officer to General David Petraeus, Commanding General of Multi-National Force – Iraq, during the period of the Surge in 2007–2008. Military analyst Tom Ricks, author of The Gamble (2009), describes Mansoor as one of the two "most important advisers to Petraeus." Mansoor retired with the rank of colonel in August 2008.

=== Academic ===
Mansoor served from 1993 to 1995 as an assistant professor of military history at the U.S. Military Academy. In September 2008, Mansoor assumed his present position as holder of the General Raymond E. Mason Jr. Chair of Military History at the Ohio State University. Mansoor's research interests include modern U.S. military history, World War II, the Iraq War, and counter-insurgency.

== Selected publications ==
- Schwerpunkt, the Second Battle of Sedan, 10–15 May 1940. Fort Knox, Ky: Command and Staff Dept., U.S. Army Armor School, 1986. OCLC 38192984
- Building Blocks of Victory: American Infantry Divisions in the War against Germany and Italy, 1941 – 1945. PhD Diss, 1995. OCLC 243855681
- The GI Offensive in Europe: The Triumph of American Infantry Divisions, 1941–1945. Lawrence, Kansas: University Press of Kansas, 1999. ISBN 070060958X OCLC 40595257
- USAREUR 2010: Harnessing the Potential of NATO Enlargement. Carlisle Barracks, PA: U.S. Army War College, 2003. OCLC 52550086
- Baghdad at Sunrise: A Brigade Commander's War in Iraq. New Haven, Conn: Yale University Press, 2009. ISBN 9780300158472 OCLC 317471909
- Surge: My Journey with General David Petraeus and the Remaking of the Iraq War. New Haven: Yale University Press, 2015, c2013. ISBN 9780300209372 OCLC 951132242
- Redemption: MacArthur and the Campaign for the Philippines. Cambridge University Press, 2025. ISBN 9781009541190 OCLC 1512071926
- Edited with Williamson Murray, Hybrid Warfare: Fighting Complex Opponents from the Ancient World to the Present. Cambridge; New York: Cambridge University Press, 2012. ISBN 9781107026087 OCLC 796796309
- Edited with Williamson Murray. Grand Strategy and Military Alliances. Cambridge; New York: Cambridge University Press, 2016. ISBN 9781107136021 OCLC 1001707310
- Edited with Williamson Murray, The Culture of Military Organizations. Cambridge; New York: Cambridge University Press, 2019. ISBN 9781108485739 OCLC 1127235720
- Edited with Thomas Robertson, Richard P. Tucker, and Nicholas Breyfogle. Nature at War: American Environments and World War II. Cambridge; New York: Cambridge University Press, 2016. ISBN 9781108419765 OCLC 1148057942
