= Battle of Karbala (2007) =

2007 battle of the Iraq War

- Part of the Iraq War
Date	27–29 August 2007
Location	Karbala, Iraq
Result	Iraqi and allied victory: Reconstruction of Karbala by Coalition forces

Belligerents
Iraq; Poland; Bulgaria; United States	Mahdi Army

Commanders and leaders
(Iraq) Gen. Hadi Al-Amiri (United States) Col. Peter Mansoor (Poland) Gen. Mieczysław Bieniek	Ali Sharia (POW) Hamza al Taie

Casualties and losses
4 killed 52 wounded	

The Battle of Karbala began on the night of 27 August 2007 and involved fighting between the Mahdi Army, who provided security for the pilgrims, and police (who were largely members of the Badr Organization) in Karbala, Iraq.

Hundreds of thousands of Shia pilgrims gathered in the city for the annual festival of Mid-Sha'ban. Security was high as pilgrims had been killed in previous years by suicide bombers.

== Summary ==
The Battle of Karbala in August 2007 was a major clash between the Iraqi security forces and Shiite militiamen in the city of Karbala, Iraq. The battle took place during the height of the sectarian violence that followed the U.S.-led invasion of Iraq in 2003. It was sparked by the decision of the Iraqi government to launch a crackdown on Shiite militias in the city, which had been accused of engaging in kidnappings, assassinations, and other violent acts. The militias, led by the Mahdi Army of the radical cleric Muqtada al-Sadr, resisted the government's efforts to disarm them, and the situation escalated into a full-blown battle that lasted for several days. The battle resulted in the deaths of more than 50 people and demonstrated the continued challenges faced by the Iraqi government in maintaining security and stability in the country.

== Battle ==
Shooting first started on 27 August 2007. The government reacted by deploying more troops to the area.

During the battle, a fight over Karbala city hall erupted between entrenched platoons of Polish and Bulgarian forces and Mahdi Army rebels. Fighting lasted for about three days and NATO forces were significantly outnumbered during the city hall battle: approximately 60 total NATO forces and about 15 Iraqi policemen against over 300 rebel irregulars. According to Polish soldiers' accounts, there was also an unknown number of Chechen mercenaries. The forces inside city hall were relieved by Polish QRF.

Prime Minister Nouri al-Maliki imposed a curfew on the morning of 29 August as fighting continued. Soon after, he claimed that the situation was under control. The curfew ordered pilgrims to leave their devotions early and ultimately failed to stop a third bout of shooting in the evening.

== Trial ==
The head of the Mahdi Army in Karbala, Ali Sharia, was arrested and tried over the violence. In August 2008 he was convicted and sentenced to death.
