= Williamson Murray =

American historian (1941–2023)

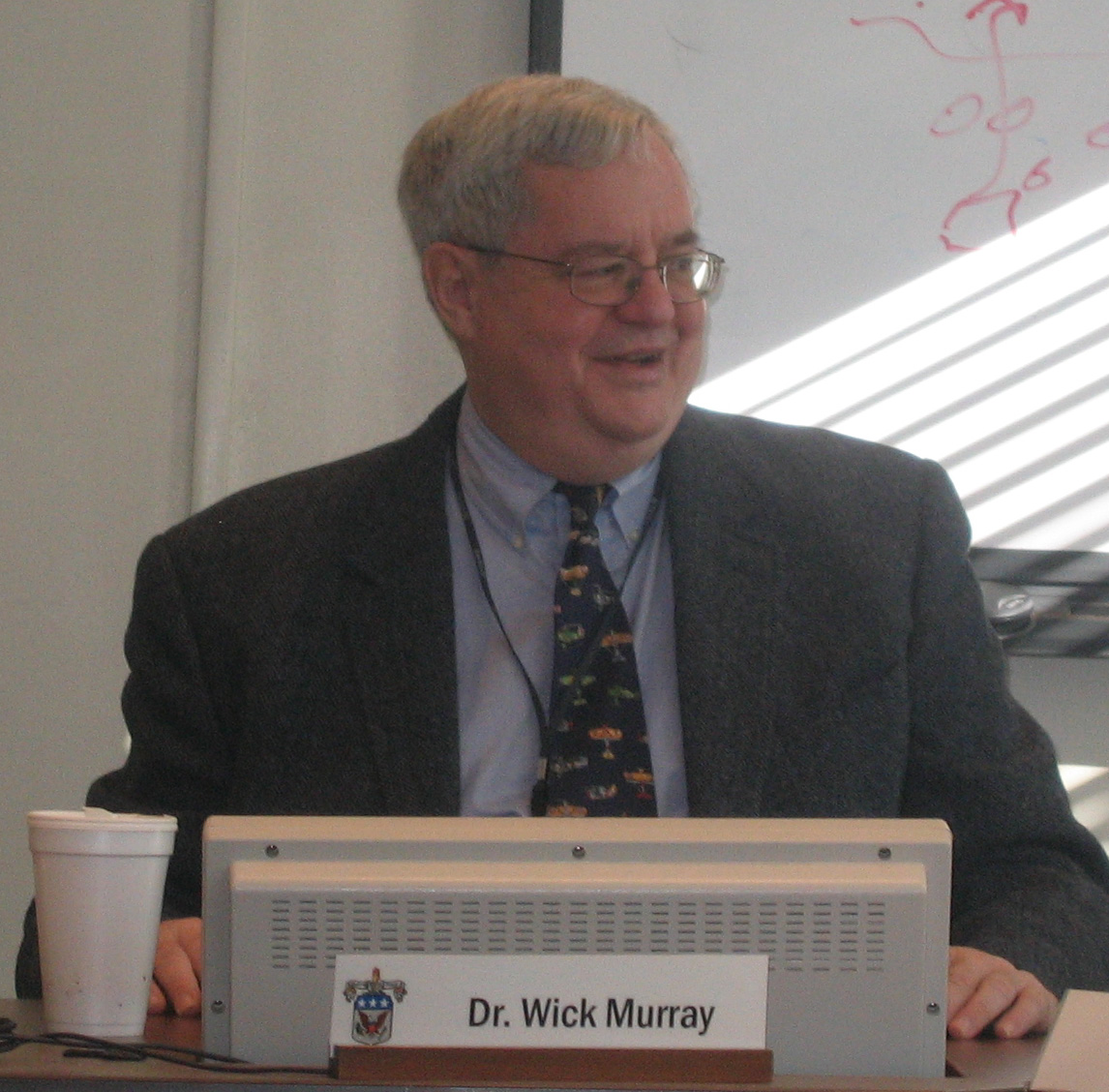
- Born: November 23, 1941; New York City, New York, U.S.
- Died: August 1, 2023 (aged 81); Fairfax, Virginia, U.S.

Academic background
- Education: Yale University

Academic work
- Main interests: Military historian (History of warfare, World War I)

Williamson "Wick" Murray (November 23, 1941 – August 1, 2023) was an American historian and author. He authored numerous works on history and strategic studies, and served as an editor on other projects extensively. He was professor emeritus of history at Ohio State University from 2012 until his death.

== Education and service ==
Murray completed his secondary education in 1959 at Berkshire School in Sheffield, Massachusetts. He attended Yale University, graduating in 1963 with honors in history. Following graduation he served as an officer in the United States Air Force for 5 years. He was assigned a tour of duty in Southeast Asia with the 314th Tactical Airlift Wing operating C-130s. Following his military service he returned to Yale as a graduate student in the Department of History, and in 1974 earned his Ph.D. in military-diplomatic history.

== Career ==
Following his graduation from Yale, Murray taught in the school's history department for two years. In 1977 he took a job at Ohio State University as a military and diplomatic historian. He was awarded the Alumni Distinguished Teaching Award in 1987. He retired from Ohio State in 1995 as a professor emeritus of history. He has taught at a number of universities, military academies and war colleges, including the United States Air War College, the United States Military Academy, and the Naval War College. He has served as a Secretary of the Navy Fellow at the Navy War College, the Centennial Visiting professor at the London School of Economics, the Matthew C. Horner Professor of Military Theory at the Marine Corps University, the Charles Lindbergh Chair at the Smithsonian's Air and Space Museum, and the Harold K. Johnson Professor of Military History at the Army War College".

Murray authored numerous works on history and strategic studies, and served as an editor on other projects extensively.

As of 2012, he was professor emeritus of history at Ohio State University.

== Death ==
Murray died in Fairfax, Virginia, on August 1, 2023, at the age of 81.

== Works ==
- 2024: The Dark Path: The Structure of War and the Rise of the West
- 2017: America and the Future of War: The Past as Prologue
- 2016: A Savage War: A Military History of the Civil War (co-author with Wayne Wei-siang Hsieh.)
- 2014: The Iran-Iraq War (co-author with Kevin Woods)
- 2014: Successful Strategies, Triumphing in War and Peace from Antiquity to the Present (co-edited with Richard Sinnreich)
- 2012: Hybrid Warfare: Fighting Complex Opponents from the Ancient World to the Present (co-edited with Peter Mansoor)
- 2011: The Shaping of Grand Strategy: Policy, Diplomacy, and War (co-editor with Richard Hart Sinnreich and James Lacey)
- 2011: War, Strategy, and Military Effectiveness
- 2011: Military Adaptation in War: With Fear of Change
- 2009: Conflicting Currents: Japan and the United States
- 2009: The Making of Peace: Rulers, States, and the Aftermath of War (co-editor with James Lacey)
- 2009: Saddam's War: An Iraqi Military Perspective of the Iran-Iraq War
- 2007: Calculations, Net Assessment and the Coming of World War II (co-author with Allan R. Millett)
- 2006: The Past as Prologue: The Importance of History to the Military Profession (co-editor with Richard Sinnreich)
- 2003: The Cambridge History of War (contributing editor)
- 2003: The Iraq War: A Military History (co-author with Major General Robert Scales Jr.)
- 2001: A War To Be Won: Fighting the Second World War (co-author with Allan R. Millett)
- 2001: The Dynamics of Military Revolution: 1300-2050 (co-editor with MacGregor Knox)
- 1999: War in the Air: 1914-1945
- 1996: Military Innovation in the Interwar Period (co-editor with Allan R. Millett)
- 1995: The Air War in the Persian Gulf
- 1994: The Making of Strategy: Rulers, States, and War (co-editor with MacGregor Knox and Alvin Bernstein)
- 1992: Calculations, Net Assessment and the Coming of World War II (co-editor with Allan R. Millett)
- 1992: German Military Effectiveness
- 1991: Military Effectiveness: Three volumes: The First World War, The Interwar Period, and the Second World War (co-editor with Allan R. Millett)
- 1985: Luftwaffe
- 1984: The Change in the European Balance of Power, 1938-1939: The Path to Ruin
- 1983: Strategy for Defeat: The Luftwaffe 1933-1945
