= Allan R. Millett =

American historian and retired colonel in the Marine Corps Reserve (born 1937)

Allan Reed Millett
- Born: October 22, 1937 (age 88)
- Military career
- Allegiance: American
- Branch: United States Marine Corps
- Rank: Colonel

Allan R. Millett (born October 22, 1937) is a historian and a retired colonel in U.S. Marine Corps Reserve. He is known for his works on the Korean War, among other military topics.

== Early life ==
Millett is the son of John D. Millett, who served as the President of Miami University in Ohio, and his wife Catherine. He has two brothers. He attended DePauw University, graduating in 1959.

== Military career ==
He served as a colonel in the U.S. Marine Corps Reserve.

He is a past president of the Marine Corps Reserve Officers Association (MCROA).

== Academic career ==
He served for 37 years in the history department at Ohio State University. He currently holds the Stephen E. Ambrose Professorship at the University of New Orleans and is also the director of the university's Eisenhower Center for American Studies.

== On television ==
He has participated in various documentary productions as an expert, including Hold at All Costs: The Story of the Battle of Outpost Harry (2010) and an episode of Greatest Tank Battles (2011).

== Publications ==
Millett has written articles for such publications as International Security, The Americas, Armed Forces & Society, Strategic Review, Journal of Strategic Studies, and Military History Quarterly.

His books include:

- — (14 July 2026). The War for Korea, 1951-1954: A Deep Trench. University Press of Kansas. ISBN 978-0700641123. LCCN 2025047019.
- —; Maslowski, Peter; Feis, William B. (25 September 2012). For the Common Defense: A Military History of the United States from 1607 to 2012. Free Press. ISBN 978-1451623536. LCCN 84013652. OCLC 1236024813. OL 24409394M – via Internet Archive.
- — (27 April 2010). The War for Korea, 1950-1951: They Came from the North. University Press of Kansas. ISBN 978-0700617098. LCCN 2009052228. OCLC 471787817. OL 2851333M.
- — (3 October 2005). The War for Korea, 1945-1950: A House Burning. Modern War Studies (1st ed.). University Press of Kansas. ISBN 978-0700613939. LCCN 2005009166. OCLC 718230198. OL 7763168M.
- —; Murray, Williamson (22 November 2001). A War To Be Won: Fighting the Second World War (3rd ed.). Belknap Press. ISBN 978-0674006805. LCCN 99086624. OCLC 952737590. OL 7670614M – via Internet Archive.
- with Williamson Murray. Military Innovation in the Interwar Period. Cambridge University Press, 1998. ISBN 0521637600
- — (11 November 1991). Semper Fidelis: The History of the United States Marine Corps. Free Press. ISBN 978-0029215951. LCCN 80001059. OCLC 832934333. OL 7270113M – via Internet Archive.
- —; Murray, Williamson (1988). Military Effectiveness: Volume I – The First World War. Vol. 1 (1st ed.). Unwin Hyman. ISBN 978-0521519977. LCCN 87015284. OCLC 874170940. OL 2386302M – via Internet Archive.
- A Short History of the Vietnam War. Indiana U. Press, 1985. ISBN 0253352150
- — (23 October 1975). The General: Robert L. Bullard & Officership In The U.S. Army, 1881-1925. Greenwood Press. ISBN 978-0837179575. LCCN 75000068. OCLC 1530541. OL 8207217M.

== Awards ==
In 2004, Millett was named the recipient of the Samuel Eliot Morison Prize from the Society for Military History for lifetime achievement. He received the Pritzker Literature Award for Lifetime Achievement in Military Writing from the Pritzker Military Museum & Library in 2008. Millett has been a Fulbright Distinguished Visiting Professor in Korea and a senior fellow of the Korea Foundation.

From the Marine Corps Heritage Foundation, he has received both the Wallace M. Greene and O.P. Smith awards.

During his career, Millett had directed over fifty doctoral dissertations. The Society for Military History named its research fellowship award for doctoral students in Millet's honor, The Allan R. Millett Dissertation Research Fellowship Award.
