= MacGregor Knox =

American historian

MacGregor Knox is an American historian of 20th-century Europe, and was from 1994 to 2010 the Stevenson Professor of International History at the London School of Economics. He is the son of the British-born classical scholar and historian Bernard Knox and the novelist Bianca Van Orden.

Knox was educated at Harvard University, graduating with a BA in 1967. He did his graduate studies at Yale University, receiving an MA and PhD in 1977. Between Harvard and Yale he served in the United States Army, including a tour of duty in Vietnam in 1969 as a rifle platoon commander with the 173rd Airborne Brigade. He taught at the University of Rochester before moving to his current post.

As a historian, Knox has specialized in the political, military and diplomatic history of Europe in the late 19th and 20th centuries, focusing on the two world wars and the emergence of dictatorship in the 1920s and 1930s. His first book, Mussolini Unleashed won the 1982 George Louis Beer Prize of the American Historical Association. He is fluent in French, Italian and German.

Knox's most recent work, To the Threshold of Power, is a comparative study of the rise of Benito Mussolini and Fascism in Italy with that of Adolf Hitler and National Socialism in Germany. Knox argues that the origins of both dictatorships can be found in the late development of both countries as united states, their shared sense of grievance against the established European powers, Britain and France, and their common sense of frustration at the outcome of World War I (Germany's sense of undeserved defeat, and Italy's sense of unrewarded victory). He rejects Marxist views that Fascism and National Socialism were agents of, or represented the interests of, capitalism or big business, and he is highly critical of both the Italian Socialist Party and the Communist Party of Germany, whose revolutionary rhetoric, he argues, provoked middle-class support for Fascism and National Socialism. On the other hand, he argues that the leadership of the Social Democratic Party of Germany, from Friedrich Ebert to Otto Braun, was the strongest pillar of German democracy under the Weimar Republic. He sees the failure of democracy in Italy and Germany as ultimately caused by the desire of the armies in both countries for an authoritarian regime that would suppress the parties of the left and allow rearmament, and a foreign policy that would reverse the verdicts of 1918.

== Books ==
- Mussolini Unleashed, 1939-1941: Politics and Strategy in Fascist Italy's Last War. Cambridge University Press, 1982.
- German Nationalism and the European Response, 1890-1945. With Carole Fink and Isabel V. Hull. University of Oklahoma Press, 1985.
- Hitler's Italian Allies: Royal Armed Forces, Fascist Regime, and the War of 1940-43. Cambridge University Press, 2000.
- Common Destiny: Dictatorship, Foreign Policy, and War in Fascist Italy and Nazi Germany. Cambridge University Press, 2000.
- The Dynamics of Military Revolution, 1300-2050. With Williamson R. Murray. Cambridge University Press, 2001.
- Destino comune. Dittatura, politica estera e guerra nell'Italia fascista e nella Germania nazista. Giulio Einaudi Editore, 2003.
- "Fascism: Ideology, Foreign Policy, and War." Liberal and Fascist Italy: 1900-1945. Adrian Lyttelton, ed. Oxford University Press, 2003.
- To the Threshold of Power, 1922/33: Origins and Dynamics of the Fascist and National Socialist Dictatorships, vol. 1. Cambridge University Press, 2007.
