= Bianca VanOrden =

American novelist (1919-2006)

- Born: Betty Baur; April 5, 1919; Leonia, New Jersey, U.S.
- Died: 2006 (age 86/87)
- Education: University of Cambridge
- Occupation: Novelist
- Spouse: Bernard Knox (m. 1939)
- Children: MacGregor Knox
- Writing career
- Genre: Fiction
- Notable awards: Guggenheim Fellowship (1959)

Betty Baur Knox (née Knox; April 5, 1919 – 2006) known by the pen name Bianca VanOrden, was an American novelist and short story writer. A 1959 Guggenheim Fellow, she wrote several fiction works, including the two short story anthology 309 East & A Night of Levitation (1957) and the novel Fire Music (1958).

== Biography ==
Betty Baur was born on April 5, 1919, in Leonia, New Jersey. She studied at the University of Cambridge, where she obtained a BA in 1939. She met Bernard Knox (who later went on to become a classicist at Harvard University) while the two attended Cambridge; the two later reunited when Knox returned to England, and in April 1939, the couple married in New Jersey. She also lived for some time in Florence.

While studying in Cambridge, VanOrden started writing; she subsequently published two short stories, later republished in the United States as 309 East & A Night of Levitation. She later released her debut novel, Water Music, which takes place in Florence and was praised by Ben Crisler of The New York Times as "a youthfully show-off performance". She won a 1958 Mademoiselle Merit Award. In 1959, she was awarded a Guggenheim Fellowship "for creative writing in fiction". She later wrote Fire Music, a World War II historical novel self-published through iUniverse; Michael Dirda of The Washington Post recommended it among several books as part of a Christmas op-ed he wrote, stating: "In our own post-attack environment, such a novel of war and peace should be doubly welcome".

VanOrden and her husband had a son, historian MacGregor Knox. Based on their experiences with Italy during World War II, she and Knox helped enroll their son in an Italian school instead of an American one, inspiring his academic expertise in Italian history. His husband often gave dedications for his book to her pen first name. She briefly stayed with his husband when he was the Nellie Wallace Lecturer at the University of Oxford, but later returned to the United States.

VanOrden died in 2006. She was cremated and is interred at Arlington National Cemetery alongside her husband.

== Works ==
- 309 East & A Night of Levitation (1957) (Note: Reviews of this book:)
- Water Music (1958) (Note: Reviews of this book:)
