= Acheson J. Duncan =

American statistician (1904–1995)

Acheson Johnston Duncan (September 24, 1904 – January 7, 1995) was a 20th-century statistician and an acknowledged authority in the field of quality control.

A native of Leonia, New Jersey, he attended Princeton University, where he received a bachelor's degree in 1925, a master's degree in 1927 and a Ph.D. in economics in 1936. He also attended the University of Chicago and Columbia University. He married Helen Foster in 1960, who died at age 91 in 1995 after his death at age 90. He had two step children, Catharine Foster Black and Joseph Foster, seven grandchildren and 5 great grand children in 1995.

Duncan spent 13 years on the faculty at Princeton University and three years in the US Army before coming to Johns Hopkins University in 1946 as an associate professor of statistics in the School of Business. Later he joined the faculty of the Department of Mechanical Engineering's program in industrial engineering from which he retired in 1971.

The American Society of Quality awarded him the Shewhart medal in 1964. In 1986, an anonymous donor established the Acheson J. Duncan Distinguished Visitor Fund at Johns Hopkins University. The endowed fund supports an annual visit to JHU and lecture by a scholar in mathematical sciences.

Besides his work with the Japanese government, Duncan served as consultant to numerous industries and governmental agencies, including the US Army Chemical Corps, Glenn L. Martin Company, and Esso Standard Oil Company.

== Selected works ==
- Duncan, Acheson J.; Smith, James G. (1944), Fundamentals of the theory of statistics (1 ed.), New York: McGraw-Hill, OCLC 180544
- Duncan, Acheson J. (1974) [1952], Quality control and industrial statistics (4 ed.), Homewood, Illinois: Richard D. Irwin, Inc., ISBN 978-0-256-01558-4, OCLC 1126032
