= Attorney General Moore =

Attorney General Moore may refer to:

- Alfred Moore (1755–1810), Attorney General of North Carolina
- George Fletcher Moore (1798–1886), Attorney-General of Western Australia
- Jacob Moore (1829–1886), Attorney General of Delaware
- Mike Moore (American politician) (born 1952), Attorney General of Mississippi
- Richard Moore (Irish lawyer) (1783–1857), Attorney-General for Ireland

== See also ==
- General Moore (disambiguation)
