= Bernard Knox =

British-American classical scholar (1914–2010)

- Born: 24 November 1914; Bradford, West Yorkshire, U.K.
- Died: 22 July 2010 (aged 95); Bethesda, Maryland, U.S.
- Resting place: Arlington National Cemetery
- Spouse: Betty Baur
- Children: MacGregor Knox
- Awards: Jefferson Lecture (1992)

Academic background
- Education: St John's College, Cambridge (BA); Harvard University (MA); Yale University (PhD)
- Thesis: Traditional Structure and Formula in the Tragic Narrative Speech (1948)

Academic work
- Discipline: Greek
- Institutions: Yale University; Harvard University
- Military career
- Allegiance: Republicans; United States
- Branch: International Brigades; United States Army
- Service years: 1936; 1941–1945
- Rank: Captain
- Conflicts: Spanish Civil War; World War II
- Awards: Bronze Star Medal; Croix de Guerre

Bernard MacGregor Walker Knox (November 24, 1914 – July 22, 2010) was an English born American classicist, author, soldier, and professor who served as the founding director of Harvard University's Center for Hellenic Studies from 1962 to 1985. In 1992 the National Endowment for the Humanities selected Knox for the Jefferson Lecture, the U.S. federal government's highest honor for achievement in the humanities.

== Biography ==
Bernard Knox was born in Bradford, England on November 24, 1914, to Rowena and Bernard Knox. His father was a professional pianist and served in the British Army during World War I. He was educated at Battersea Grammar School where he took an interest in language, studying French, Latin, and Greek.

He attended St John's College, Cambridge on a scholarship in the classics. He was mentored by Martin Charlesworth In 1936, he joined and was wounded in combat with the International Brigades in the Spanish Civil War, which he joined alongside John Cornford, Tom Wintringham, John Sommerfield and Jan Kurzke. In 1939 he married an American, Betty Baur, a novelist who wrote under the pen name Bianca VanOrden; she died in 2006. His son, Macgregor Knox, is a prominent historian of 20th century Europe.

Knox served in the United States Army during World War II. Bored with his first Army assignment with an anti-aircraft battery in England, he volunteered for work with the Office of Strategic Services as he spoke French and some German. The OSS assigned him to the Jedburgh program, and he parachuted into Brittany on July 7, 1944, with team GILES. His team evaded German capture while working with the area resistance, arranging clandestine air parachute drops of weapons, and, when the regulars arrived, did liaison work between the US forces and the French resistance in order to sweep the German Army out of Brittany. In the spring of 1945, he deployed to Italy with an OSS team to work with the Italian Partisans scouting for Allied forces. It was here, during a firefight, where he was pinned down in a monastery filled with books that he resolved to take up his studies in the classics should he survive the war. He did so and received an M.A. from Harvard, and a PhD from Yale. In the army, he achieved the rank of captain.

Knox taught at Yale until 1961, when he was appointed the first director of Harvard's Center for Hellenic Studies in Washington, D.C. After fulfilling a previous commitment to spend a year as Sather Lecturer at the University of California, Berkeley, Knox served as director of the center from 1962 until his retirement in 1985. He continued to write prolifically.

Knox is known for his efforts to make classics more accessible to the public. In 1959 his translations of Oedipus Rex were used to produce a series of television films for Encyclopædia Britannica and the Massachusetts Council for the Humanities, featuring the cast of the Canadian Stratford Shakespeare Festival. He taught the poet Robert Fagles at Yale, and became Fagles's lifelong friend and the author of the introductions and notes for Fagles's translations of Sophocles's three Theban plays, Homer's Iliad and Odyssey, and Virgil's Aeneid. Reviewing the Fagles Iliad in The New York Times, classicist Oliver Taplin described Knox's 60-page introduction as "His Master's Voice, taking the best of contemporary scholarship and giving it special point and vividness, as only Mr. Knox can." His combat experiences in World War II subtly inform these introductions.

Knox was the editor of The Norton Book of Classical Literature and also wrote extensively for The New York Review of Books. Knox received the 1977 George Jean Nathan Award for Dramatic Criticism for one of his New York Review pieces, a review of Andrei Şerban's controversial Lincoln Center production of Agamemnon; the award committee described Knox's work as "a brilliant review of a major theatrical event" in which Knox "recognized that the director was attempting to solve the central problem of this play by finding a new way to express long passages of lyric language that have lost their immediacy for modern audiences." In 1990 he received the first PEN/Diamonstein-Spielvogel Award for the Art of the Essay for his book Essays Ancient and Modern.

Knox is also known for his role in the controversy over similarities between Stephen Spender's World Within World and David Leavitt's While England Sleeps: it was Knox, reviewing Leavitt's book for The Washington Post, who first pointed out its similarities to Spender's older memoir (which Knox had reviewed in 1951). This ultimately led to Spender suing Leavitt and forcing the withdrawal and revision of Leavitt's book.

The National Endowment for the Humanities awarded Knox the Charles Frankel Prize in 1990, and in 1992 it selected Knox for the Jefferson Lecture, the U.S. federal government's highest honor for achievement in the humanities. Knox's lecture, which he gave the intentionally "provocative" title "The Oldest Dead White European Males", became the basis for Knox's book of the same name, in which Knox defended the continuing relevance of classical Greek culture to modern society.

He died of heart failure on July 22, 2010. He was buried with honors at Arlington National Cemetery.

== Awards and honors ==
- 1945: Two Bronze Stars and the Croix de Guerre
- 1956: Guggenheim Fellowship
- 1977: George Jean Nathan Award for Dramatic Criticism, "for his review of Andrei Serban's production of Agamemnon at Lincoln Center, published in the New York Review of Books"
- 1977: Elected to the American Academy of Arts and Sciences
- 1985: Elected to the American Philosophical Society
- 1990: Charles Frankel Prize, from the National Endowment for the Humanities
- 1990: PEN/Diamonstein-Spielvogel Award for the Art of the Essay, for Essays Ancient and Modern
- 1992: Selected for the Jefferson Lecture by the National Endowment for the Humanities
- 2004: The Thomas Jefferson Medal, awarded by the American Philosophical Society

== Publications ==
Books:

- Bernard Knox, Cleanth Brooks, Maynard Mack, Tragic Themes in Western Literature: Seven Essays by Bernard Knox and Others (Yale University Press, 1955), ISBN 978-0-300-00328-4.
- Bernard Knox, Oedipus at Thebes (Yale University Press, 1957), reissued as Oedipus at Thebes: Sophocles' Tragic Hero and His Time (Yale University Press, 1998), ISBN 978-0-585-37637-0.
- Bernard Knox, The heroic temper: studies in Sophoclean tragedy (University of California Press, 1964), ISBN 978-0-520-04957-4.
- Bernard Knox, Word and Action: Essays on the Ancient Theater (1979) (reprint, Johns Hopkins University Press, 1986), ISBN 978-0-8018-3409-7
- Bernard Knox, Essays Ancient and Modern (Johns Hopkins University Press, 1989), ISBN 978-0-8018-3789-0.
- Bernard Knox, editor, The Norton Book of Classical Literature (Norton, 1993), ISBN 978-0-393-03426-4.
- Bernard Knox, The Oldest Dead White European Males and Other Reflections on the Classics (1993) (reprint, W. W. Norton & Company, 1994), ISBN 978-0-393-31233-1.
- Bernard Knox, Backing Into the Future: The Classical Tradition and Its Renewal (W.W. Norton, 1994), ISBN 978-0-393-03595-7.

Articles and Book Chapters:

- "The Continuity of Greek Culture". Perspectives on Culture and Society. 1: 149–164. 1988.
- "Premature Anti-Fascist". The Antioch Review. 57 (2). Essays, Personal & Political: 133–149. Spring 1999. JSTOR 4613837.

== Selected introductions ==
- Sophocles, tr. Robert Fagles, notes by Bernard Knox, The three Theban plays (Viking Press, 1982), ISBN 978-0-670-69805-9.
- Homer, tr. Robert Fagles, intro. Bernard Knox, The Iliad (Penguin Classics, 1991), ISBN 978-0-14-044592-3.
- Homer, tr. Robert Fagles, intro. Bernard Knox, The Odyssey (Penguin Classics, 1997), ISBN 978-0-14-026886-7.
- Virgil, tr. Robert Fagles, intro. Bernard Knox, The Aeneid (Viking, 2006), ISBN 978-0-670-03803-9.
- Moses I. Finley, intro. Bernard Knox, The World of Odysseus (New York Review of Books, 2002), ISBN 978-1-59017-017-5.
