= Sara Hawks Sterling =

American dramatist

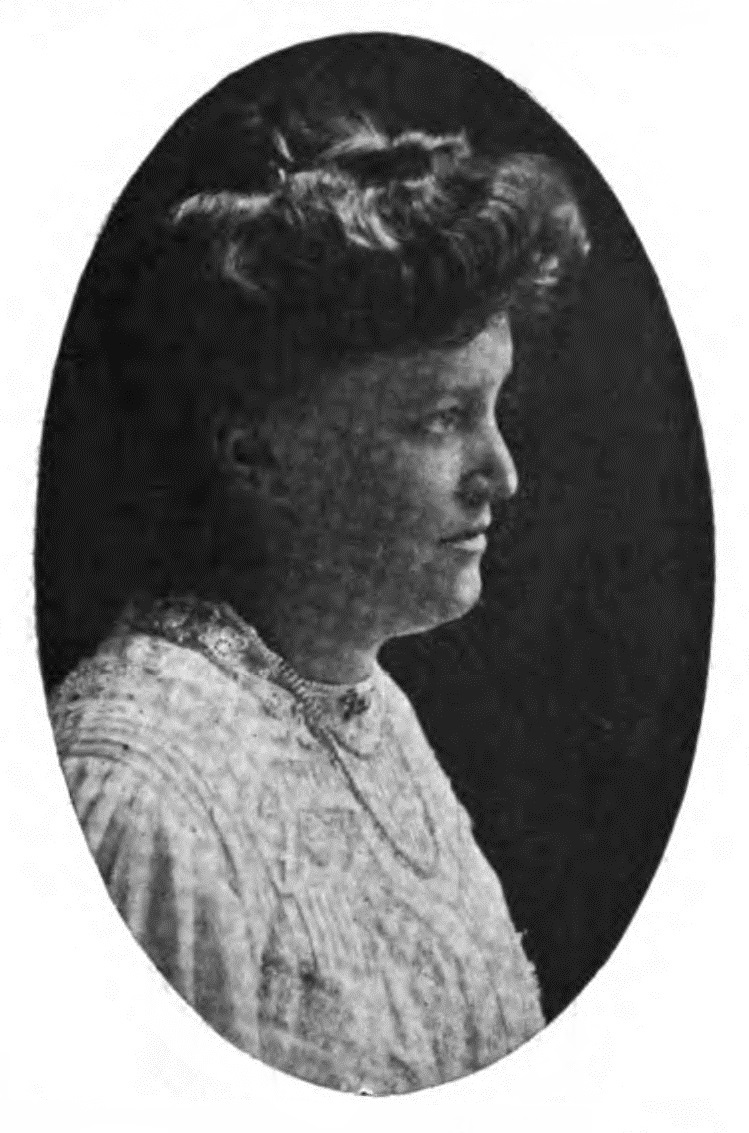
Sara Hawks Sterling

Sara Hawks Sterling (March 4, 1874 - December 26, 1936) was an American schoolteacher and novelist.

Sterling specialized in fiction about historical and legendary figures, such as King Arthur, Robin Hood, and Anne Hathaway. Her novel Shakespeare's Sweetheart, published in 1905, is an early attempt to view William Shakespeare's life and romantic exploits from a female perspective. Shakespeare's Sweetheart and A Lady of King Arthur's Court were both illustrated by Clara Elsene Peck.

== Personal life ==
Sterling was born on March 4, 1874, in Philadelphia, Pennsylvania, to Dr. John and Mary Sterling. She appears to have remained in Philadelphia, and never married. According to her listing in the Woman's Who's who in America of 1914–1915, she was against women's suffrage; however, her actual viewpoints regarding women's suffrage have never been concretely determined. She was a member of the Browning Society of Philadelphia, the Shakespeare Company, and the Dickens Fellowship.

In addition to her writing, Sterling taught English at the Philadelphia High School for Girls from 1906 to 1912, and the West Philadelphia High School for Girls starting in 1912. She earned a bachelor of arts in teaching from the University of Pennsylvania in 1918, and was a member of the Women Teachers' Organization.

She died December 26, 1936, in Philadelphia, Pennsylvania, of pneumonia, which she caught after directing a Christmas play for the Philadelphia High School for Girls. She is buried at Woodlands Cemetery in Philadelphia, Pennsylvania.

== Works ==
- Hamlet's brides: a Shakespearean burlesque in one act (1900)
- Shakespeare's sweetheart (1905)
- A Lady of King Arthur's Court: Being a Romance of the Holy Grail (1907)
- Robin Hood and his merry men (1921)

== Links ==
- "Online Books page for Sara Hawks Sterling". onlinebooks.library.upenn.edu.
