= Vreeland House =

Historic house in New Jersey, United States

- U.S. National Register of Historic Places
- New Jersey Register of Historic Places
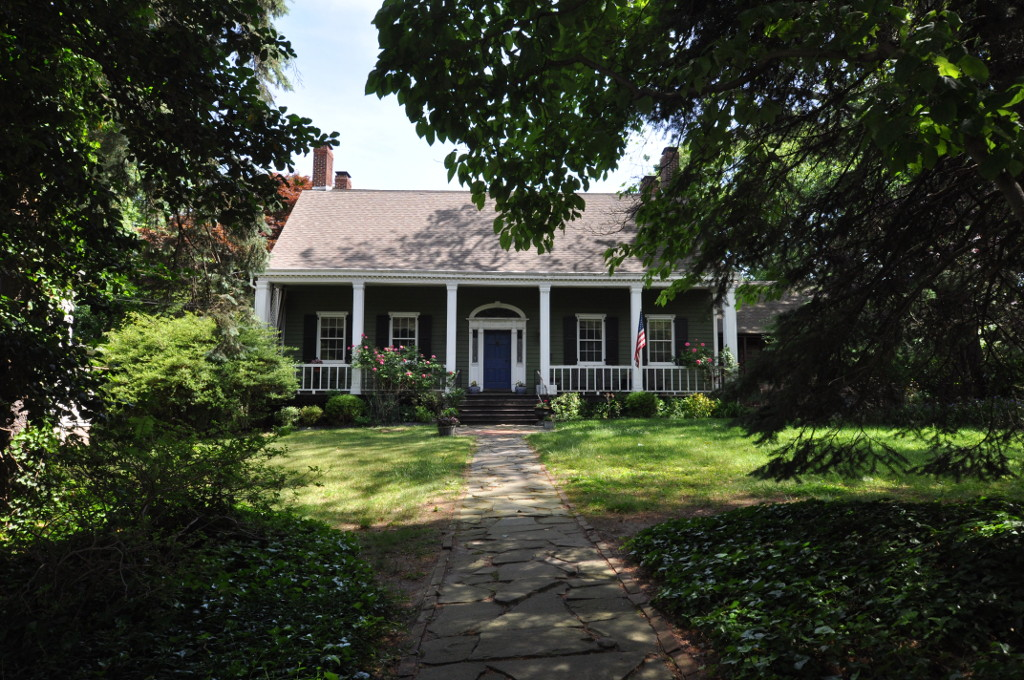
- The Vreeland House in 2019

- Location within Bergen County, New Jersey Location within New Jersey Location within the United States
- Location: 125 Lakeview Avenue, Leonia, New Jersey
- Coordinates: 40°52′26″N 73°59′6″W
- Built: 1786
- MPS: Stone Houses of Bergen County TR
- NRHP reference No.: 78001738
- NJRHP No.: 548

Significant dates
- Added to NRHP: November 17, 1978
- Designated NJRHP: April 27, 1978

The Vreeland House is a historic stone house located at 125 Lakeview Avenue in the borough of Leonia in Bergen County, New Jersey, United States. The house was built in 1786 by Dirck Vreeland. His son Michael D. Vreeland, added the main Dutch style wing of the house in 1815. The house remained in the Vreeland family until 1928. It was documented by the Historic American Buildings Survey (HABS) in 1936. The house was added to the National Register of Historic Places on November 17, 1978, for its significance in architecture and exploration/settlement. It was listed as part of the Early Stone Houses of Bergen County Multiple Property Submission (MPS).

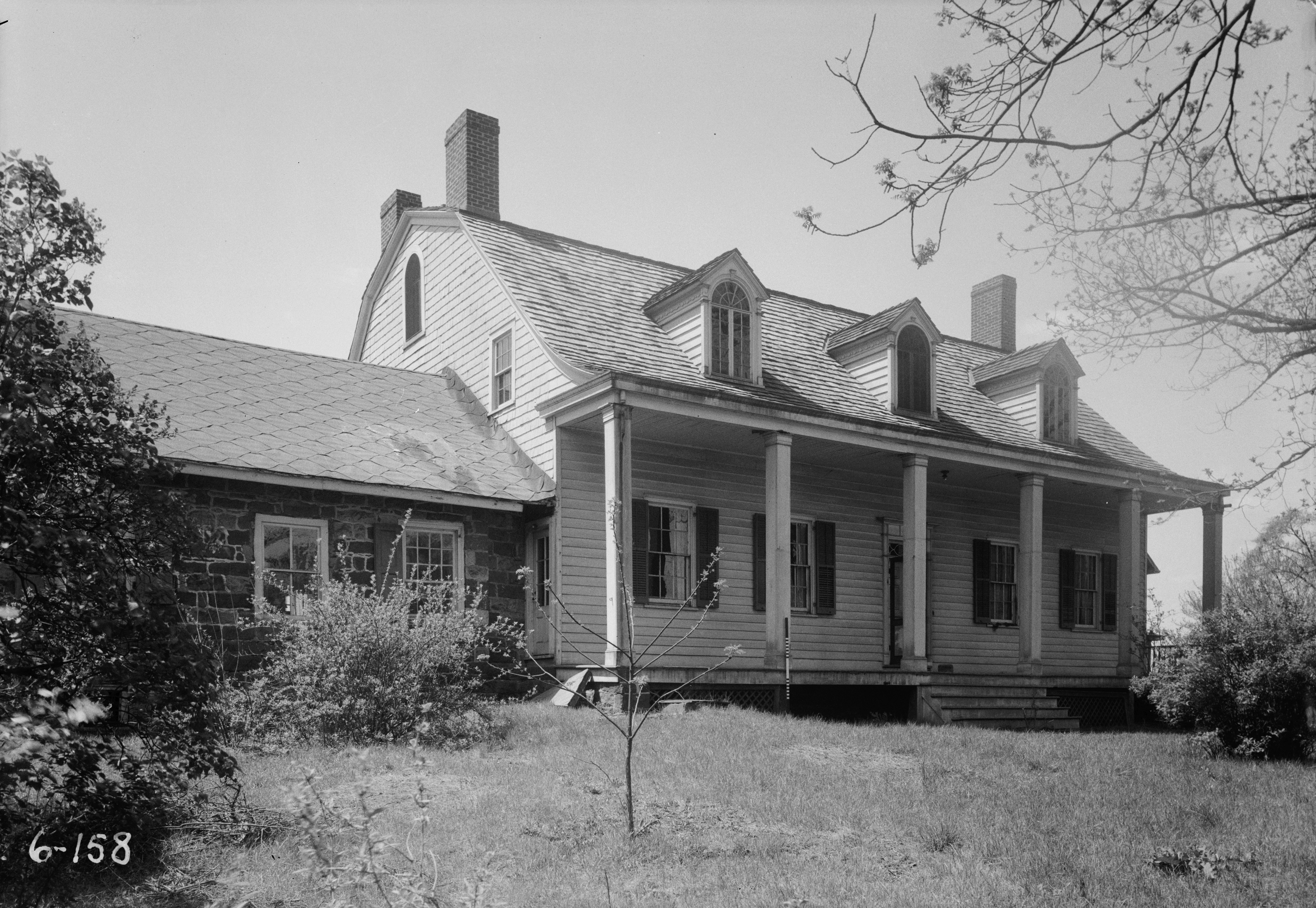
HABS photo from 1936

== See also ==
- National Register of Historic Places listings in Bergen County, New Jersey
- English Neighborhood
