= Leonia, New Jersey =

Borough in Bergen County, New Jersey, US

- Borough
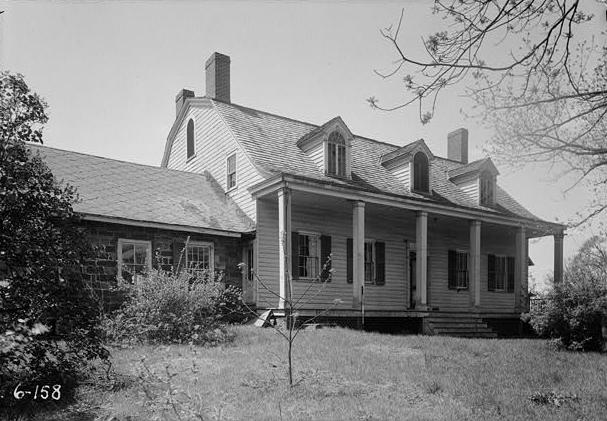
- Vreeland House

- Seal

- Location of Leonia in Bergen County highlighted in red (left). Inset map: Location of Bergen County in New Jersey highlighted in orange (right).

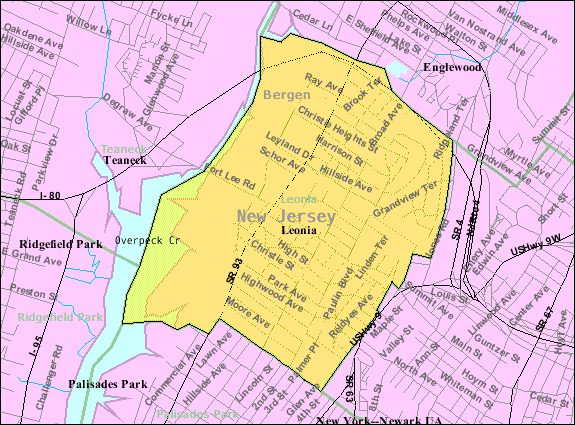
- Census Bureau map of Leonia, New Jersey
- Interactive map of Leonia, New Jersey
- Location in Bergen County Location in New Jersey Location in the United States
- Coordinates: 40.863391°N 73.988466°W
- Country: United States
- State: New Jersey
- County: Bergen
- Incorporated: December 5, 1894

Government
  - Type: Borough
  - Body: Borough Council
  - Mayor: William Ziegler (D, term ends December 31, 2027)
  - Administrator: Marisa Mesropian
  - Municipal clerk: Jonathan Mandel

Area
  - Total: 1.63 sq mi (4.22 km^{2})
  - Land: 1.52 sq mi (3.94 km^{2})
  - Water: 0.10 sq mi (0.27 km^{2}) 6.50%
  - Rank: 435th of 565 in state 56th of 70 in county
- Elevation: 85 ft (26 m)

Population (2020)
  - Total: 9,304
  - Estimate (2023): 9,303
  - Rank: 255th of 565 in state 42nd of 70 in county
  - Density: 6,109/sq mi (2,359/km^{2})
  - Rank: 89th of 565 in state 25th of 70 in county
- Time zone: UTC−05:00 (Eastern (EST))
  - Summer (DST): UTC−04:00 (Eastern (EDT))
- ZIP Code: 07605
- Area code: 201
- FIPS code: 3400340020
- GNIS feature ID: 0885276
- Website: www.leonianj.gov

Leonia is a borough in Bergen County, in the U.S. state of New Jersey. As of the 2020 United States census, the borough's population was 9,304, an increase of 367 (+4.1%) from the 2010 census count of 8,937, which in turn reflected an increase of 23 (+0.3%) from the 8,914 counted in the 2000 census. The borough is a suburb of New York City, near the western approach to the George Washington Bridge.

Leonia was formed as the result of a referendum passed on December 5, 1894, from portions of Ridgefield Township. The borough formed during the "boroughitis" phenomenon then sweeping Bergen County, in which 26 boroughs were formed in the county in 1894 alone. Portions of Leonia were taken on February 19, 1895, to form the Township of Teaneck.

New Jersey Monthly magazine ranked Leonia the 31st-best place to live in its 2008 rankings of the "Best Places To Live" in New Jersey.

== History ==
Leonia's original inhabitants were the Hackensack tribe (Ashkineshacky) of Native Americans. The population was about 1,000 before the Europeans settled in the area. At the time of the American Revolutionary War, Leonia was known as part of the English Neighborhood, a name that survives in neighboring Englewood. It was settled in 1668 mainly by Dutch and English farmers, making it one of the oldest communities in the state. A third of the population was African slaves. It was on the western slope of the Palisades, and started as a quiet farming community. Leonia's proximity to New York City and its major universities, theaters, and performing venues contributed to its place in the world of art and academics, with many artists and leading thinkers living there in the 20th century.

The local economy that had focused on agriculture underwent economic and cultural growth during the late 19th century, marked by the introduction of train service. Leonia was originally called West Fort Lee. In 1865, J. Vreeland Moore and other town leaders chose the name "Leonia" in honor of American Revolutionary War General Charles Lee, for whom Fort Lee is named.

In 1899, after traveling through Leonia upon arriving in New Jersey by ferry at Edgewater, advertising executive Artemus Ward purchased a large piece of land and established the Leonia Heights Land Company to develop and market housing in the community. His advertising attracted many academics and artists who were drawn to Leonia's small size, culture, and location, leading to the town's nickname, the "Athens of New Jersey".

In 1915, Harvey Dunn established the Leonia School of Illustration, fostering the artists' colony that emerged over the next decade. By the 1930s, it had the highest number of residents per capita in Who's Who in America, and 80% of its residents were college graduates. Transportation through the borough was enhanced by access to ferries and trolley systems, and Leonia became a refuge for many of America's most creative thinkers, including five Nobel Prize winners.

For 200 years, one of Leonia's two major north-south avenues, Grand Avenue (the other is Broad Avenue), was called the English Neighborhood Road. In colonial times, it served as the main inland route between Paulus Hook, Bergen, and the English Neighborhood. Leonia was a crossroads of the American Revolution and a training ground for American Civil War soldiers.

Historic places in Leonia include the Civil War Drill Hall and Armory and the Cole-Allaire House, constructed around 1765, making it the borough's oldest dwelling, which was placed on the National Register of Historic Places in 1976. The Vreeland House, constructed in 1786 by Dirck Vreeland and expanded in 1815, was added to the National Register of Historic Places in 1978.

Leonia celebrates "Leonia Day" annually on the third Sunday in May.

== Geography ==
According to the United States Census Bureau, the borough has an area of 1.63 square miles (4.22 km^{2}), including 1.52 square miles (3.94 km^{2}) of land and 0.11 square miles (0.27 km^{2}) of water (6.50%).

The borough center's elevation is 115 feet (35 m), but the borough's western part can reach 5 feet (1.5 m) and the eastern part 318 feet (97 m).

The borough borders the Bergen County municipalities of Englewood, Fort Lee, Palisades Park, Ridgefield Park and Teaneck.

Leonia is designated as a Tree City USA, receiving its 21st annual recognition in 2010 from the National Arbor Day Foundation.

== Demographics ==
Historical population
Census	Pop.	Note	%±
1900	804		—
1910	1,486		84.8%
1920	2,979		100.5%
1930	5,350		79.6%
1940	5,763		7.7%
1950	7,378		28.0%
1960	8,384		13.6%
1970	8,847		5.5%
1980	8,027		−9.3%
1990	8,365		4.2%
2000	8,914		6.6%
2010	8,937		0.3%
2020	9,304		4.1%
2023 (est.)	9,303	▼	0.0%
Population sources: 1900–1920 1900–1910; 1910–1930 1900–2020; 2000 2010 2020

=== Racial and ethnic composition ===
Leonia borough, Bergen County, New Jersey – Racial and ethnic composition Note: the US Census treats Hispanic/Latino as an ethnic category. This table excludes Latinos from the racial categories and assigns them to a separate category. Hispanics/Latinos may be of any race.
Race / Ethnicity (NH = Non-Hispanic)	Pop 2000	Pop 2010	Pop 2020	% 2000	% 2010	% 2020
White alone (NH)	5,123	3,941	3,256	57.47%	44.10%	35.00%
Black or African American alone (NH)	185	169	202	2.08%	1.89%	2.17%
Native American or Alaska Native alone (NH)	4	6	2	0.04%	0.07%	0.02%
Asian alone (NH)	2,317	3,122	3,876	25.99%	34.93%	41.66%
Native Hawaiian or Pacific Islander alone (NH)	1	0	0	0.01%	0.00%	0.00%
Other race alone (NH)	10	32	32	0.11%	0.36%	0.34%
Mixed race or Multiracial (NH)	139	178	267	1.56%	1.99%	2.87%
Hispanic or Latino (any race)	1,135	1,489	1,669	12.73%	16.66%	17.94%
Total	8,914	8,937	9,304	100.00%	100.00%	100.00%

=== 2020 census ===
As of the 2020 census, Leonia had a population of 9,304. The median age was 44.2 years. 21.8% of residents were under the age of 18 and 19.1% were 65 years of age or older. For every 100 females there were 91.6 males, and for every 100 females age 18 and over there were 86.5 males.

100.0% of residents lived in urban areas, while 0.0% lived in rural areas.

There were 3,359 households, of which 36.4% had children under the age of 18 living in them. Of all households, 60.8% were married-couple households, 11.1% had a male householder and no spouse or partner present, and 25.0% had a female householder and no spouse or partner present. About 18.8% of all households were made up of individuals, and 10.2% had someone living alone who was 65 years of age or older.

There were 3,476 housing units, of which 3.4% were vacant. The homeowner vacancy rate was 1.0% and the rental vacancy rate was 3.9%.

=== 2010 census ===
The 2010 United States census counted 8,937 people, 3,284 households, and 2,519 families in the borough. The population density was 5,819.5 per square mile (2,246.9/km^{2}). There were 3,428 housing units at an average density of 2,232.2 per square mile (861.9/km^{2}). The racial makeup was 55.22% (4,935) White, 2.34% (209) Black or African American, 0.16% (14) Native American, 35.12% (3,139) Asian, 0.01% (1) Pacific Islander, 3.71% (332) from other races, and 3.44% (307) from two or more races. Hispanic or Latino of any race were 16.66% (1,489) of the population. Korean Americans accounted for 26.5% of the population.

Of the 3,284 households, 34.8% had children under the age of 18; 61.2% were married couples living together; 11.3% had a female householder with no husband present and 23.3% were non-families. Of all households, 20.0% were made up of individuals and 9.7% had someone living alone who was 65 years of age or older. The average household size was 2.72 and the average family size was 3.13.

22.3% of the population were under the age of 18, 6.8% from 18 to 24, 23.9% from 25 to 44, 31.8% from 45 to 64, and 15.1% who were 65 years of age or older. The median age was 43.0 years. For every 100 females, the population had 92.9 males. For every 100 females ages 18 and older there were 88.9 males.

Same-sex couples headed 35 households in 2010, more than double the 17 counted in 2000.

The Census Bureau's 2006–2010 American Community Survey showed that (in 2010 inflation-adjusted dollars) median household income was $66,271 (with a margin of error of +/− $9,365) and the median family income was $91,129 (+/− $16,890). Males had a median income of $54,754 (+/− $8,175) versus $60,057 (+/− $8,680) for females. The per capita income for the borough was $40,030 (+/− $4,132). About 5.8% of families and 9.1% of the population were below the poverty line, including 12.2% of those under age 18 and 8.9% of those age 65 or over.

=== 2000 census ===
As of the 2000 United States census there were 8,914 people, 3,271 households, and 2,436 families residing in the borough. The population density was 5,921.3 inhabitants per square mile (2,286.2/km^{2}). There were 3,343 housing units at an average density of 2,220.6 per square mile (857.4/km^{2}). The racial makeup of the borough was 65.74% White, 2.27% African American, 0.09% Native American, 26.06% Asian, 0.01% Pacific Islander, 3.20% from other races, and 2.64% from two or more races. Hispanic or Latino of any race were 12.73% of the population.

There were 3,271 households, out of which 36.7% had children under the age of 18 living with them, 61.5% were married couples living together, 9.5% had a female householder with no husband present, and 25.5% were non-families. 22.1% of all households were made up of individuals, and 10.3% had someone living alone who was 65 years of age or older. The average household size was 2.72 and the average family size was 3.20.

In the borough, the population was spread out, with 24.6% under the age of 18, 5.9% from 18 to 24, 29.0% from 25 to 44, 26.9% from 45 to 64, and 13.7% who were 65 years of age or older. The median age was 40 years. For every 100 females, there were 92.7 males. For every 100 females age 18 and over, there were 87.7 males.

The median income for a household in the borough was $72,440, and the median income for a family was $84,591. Males had a median income of $55,156 versus $38,125 for females. The per capita income for the borough was $35,352. About 5.0% of families and 6.5% of the population were below the poverty line, including 9.0% of those under age 18 and 1.8% of those age 65 or over.

As of the 2000 Census, 17.24% of Leonia's residents identified themselves as being of Korean ancestry, which was the fourth-highest in the United States and second-highest of any municipality in New Jersey—behind neighboring Palisades Park (36.38%)—for all places with 1,000 or more residents identifying their ancestry. Additionally, 3.07% of Leonia's residents identified themselves as being of Japanese ancestry, which was the fourth-highest of any municipality in New Jersey — behind Fort Lee (6.09%), Demarest (3.72%) and Edgewater (3.22%)—for all places with 1,000 or more residents identifying their ancestry.

== Arts and culture ==
Leonia is home to the Players Guild of Leonia, New Jersey's oldest continuing theatre troupe and one of the oldest community theatre groups in the state, with continuous performances since 1919. Performances have included comedies, tragedies, classics, and musicals. The Guild's 1940 production of One Mad Night was the first three-act play performed on television, when it was broadcast on WPTZ, in Philadelphia, Pennsylvania. The Children's Show was instituted in 1963 and continues each spring. Between 1968 and 1998, the Guild produced Theatre in the Park. Since 2002, the Guild has produced a Playwright's Showcase featuring original scripts. The Guild operates out of the historic Civil War Drill Hall Theatre on Grand Avenue, which is leased from the borough. Recent productions include Lovers and Other Strangers, The Glass Menagerie, Love, Loss, and What I Wore and Hair. Upcoming productions include a fall production of Guys and Dolls.

Since 2000, Leonia has also been home to Summerstage at Leonia, which produces a Broadway-style family musical each summer in the last two weeks of July. Summerstage performances were originally held in the Leonia High School Little Theater but now take place at the Civil War Drill Hall Theater. Auditions are held in May and open to all in the NYC metro area. Past shows have included The Wizard of Oz, Carousel, The Sound of Music, Annie, Oliver, Les Miserables, My Fair Lady, and How To Succeed In Business Without Really Trying.

The Leonia Chamber Musicians Society, founded in 1973, is made up of professional musicians who reside in Leonia, and gives classical music concerts four times a year at various venues in the borough.

Leonia aims to build its art and cultural environment by displaying outdoor sculpture throughout the community and in the Erika and David Boyd Sculpture Garden, on the grounds of the Leonia Borough Annex. This group sponsors an annual Taste of Leonia fundraiser. Leonia Arts provides a calendar of all arts events in Leonia.

== Parks and recreation ==
Leonia has five public recreational areas, of which only the Leonia Swim Club requires a membership fee. The recreation areas include Wood Park, on the corner of Broad Avenue and Fort Lee Road; Sylvan Park and the Leonia Swim Club, both on Grand Avenue near Sylvan Avenue; and the Recreational Center on Broad Avenue, which has an indoor basketball court.

Overpeck County Park, a Bergen County park in Leonia, Ridgefield Park, and Teaneck, is home to the county's World Trade Center Memorial.

Field Station: Dinosaurs is a dinosaur-themed park in Overpeck County Park, just south of Interstate 95, with 32 animatronic dinosaurs.

== Government ==
=== Local government ===
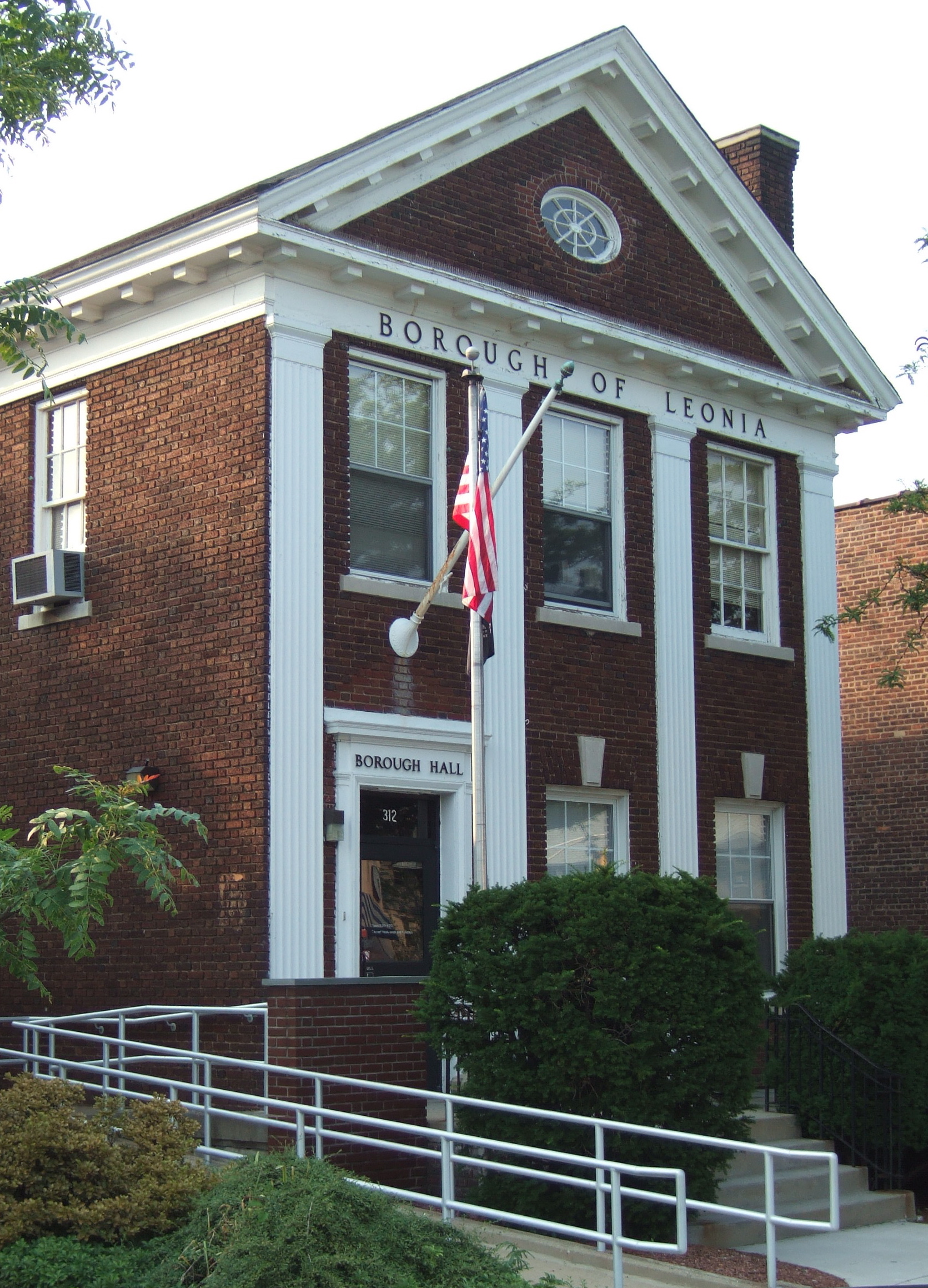
The Borough Hall of Leonia

Leonia is governed under the borough form of New Jersey municipal government, one of 218 municipalities (of the 564) statewide that use this form, New Jersey's most common form of government. The governing body comprises a mayor and a borough council, with all positions elected at-large on a partisan basis in the November general election. Voters directly elect a mayor to a four-year term. The borough council includes six members elected to serve three-year terms on a staggered basis, with two seats up for election each year in a three-year cycle. Leonia's borough form of government is "weak mayor / strong council", in which council members act as the legislative body, with the mayor presiding at meetings and voting only in the event of a tie. The mayor can veto ordinances subject to an override by a two-thirds majority vote of the council. The mayor makes committee and liaison assignments for council members, and makes most appointments with the council's advice and consent.

As of 2024, Leonia's mayor is Democrat William Ziegler, whose term ends on December 31, 2027. Members of the Leonia Borough Council are Council President Jordan Zeigler (D, 2026), Scott Fisher (D, 2025), Louis Grandelis (D, 2027), Christoph Hesterbrink (D, 2025), Diane M. Scarangella (D, 2026), and Joanne Choi Terrell (D, 2027).

=== Federal, state, and county representation ===
Leonia is in New Jersey's 5th congressional district and New Jersey's 37th state legislative district. It was in the 9th congressional district from 2013 to 2022.

For the 119th United States Congress, New Jersey's 5th congressional district is represented by Josh Gottheimer (D, Wyckoff). New Jersey is represented in the United States Senate by Democrats Cory Booker (Newark, term ends 2027) and Andy Kim (Moorestown, term ends 2031).

For the 2026–2027 session, the 37th legislative district of the New Jersey Legislature is represented in the New Jersey Senate by Gordon M. Johnson (D, Englewood) and in the General Assembly by Shama Haider (D, Tenafly) and Ellen Park (D, Englewood Cliffs).

Bergen County is governed by a directly elected County Executive, with legislative functions performed by a Board of County Commissioners comprised of seven members who are elected at-large to three-year terms in partisan elections on a staggered basis, with either two or three seats coming up for election each November; a Chairman and Vice Chairman are selected from among its seven members at a reorganization meeting held every January. As of 2025, the county executive is James J. Tedesco III (D, Paramus), whose four-year term of office ends December 31, 2026.

Bergen County's Commissioners are Chair Mary J. Amoroso (D, Mahwah, 2025), Vice Chair Steven A. Tanelli (D, North Arlington, 2027), Chair Pro Tem Joan Voss (D, Fort Lee, 2026), Rafael Marte (D, Bergenfield, 2026), Germaine M. Ortiz (D, Emerson, 2025), Thomas J. Sullivan Jr. (D, Montvale, 2025) and Tracy Silna Zur (D, Franklin Lakes, 2027).

Bergen County's elected constitutional officials are Clerk John S. Hogan (D, Northvale, 2026), Sheriff Anthony Cureton (D, Englewood, 2027) and Surrogate Michael R. Dressler (D, Cresskill, 2026).

=== Politics ===
As of March 2011, there were 4,713 registered voters in Leonia, of whom 2,493 (52.9% vs. 31.7% countywide) were registered as Democrats, 598 (12.7% vs. 21.1%) were registered as Republicans, and 1,619 (34.4% vs. 47.1%) were registered as Unaffiliated. Three voters were registered as Libertarians or Greens. Of the borough's 2010 census population, 52.7% (vs. 57.1% in Bergen County) were registered to vote, including 67.9% of those over 18 (vs. 73.7% countywide).

Gubernatorial election results for Leonia
Year	Republican		Democratic		Third party(ies)	
Year	No.	%	No.	%	No.	%
2025	872	28.42%	2,186	71.25%	10	0.33%
2021	785	32.46%	1,615	66.79%	18	0.74%
2017	502	25.90%	1,402	72.34%	34	1.75%
2013	1,015	47.88%	1,078	50.85%	27	1.27%
2009	901	33.25%	1,682	62.07%	127	4.69%
2005	814	31.43%	1,721	66.45%	55	2.12%

In the 2012 presidential election, Democrat Barack Obama received 2,451 votes (66.8% vs. 54.8% countywide) to Republican Mitt Romney's 1,135 (30.9% vs. 43.5%) and other candidates' 47 (1.3% vs. 0.9%). The borough's 5,065 registered voters cast 3,668 ballots, for a turnout of 72.4% (vs. 70.4% in Bergen County). In the 2008 presidential election, Obama received 2,604 votes (65.9% vs. 53.9% countywide) to Republican John McCain's 1,273 (32.2% vs. 44.5%) and other candidates' 30 (0.8% vs. 0.8%). The borough's 5,050 registered voters cast 3,953 ballots, for a turnout of 78.3% (vs. 76.8% in Bergen County). In the 2004 presidential election, Democrat John Kerry received 2,468 votes (64.4% vs. 51.7% countywide) to Republican George W. Bush's 1,327 (34.6% vs. 47.2%) and other candidates' 25 (0.7% vs. 0.7%). The borough's 4,878 registered voters cast 3,835 ballots, for a turnout of 78.6% (vs. 76.9% in the whole county).

Presidential elections results
Year	Republican	Democratic
2024	32.8% 1,306	64.5% 2,572
2020	28.8% 1,293	69.8% 3,136
2016	27.7% 998	69.1% 2,494
2012	30.9% 1,135	66.8% 2,451
2008	32.2% 1,273	65.9% 2,604
2004	34.6% 1,327	64.4% 2,468

In the 2013 gubernatorial election, Democrat Barbara Buono received 50.8% of the vote (1,078 cast), ahead of Republican Chris Christie with 47.9% (1,015 votes), and other candidates with 1.3% (27 votes), among the 2,205 ballots cast by the borough's 4,826 registered voters (85 ballots were spoiled), for a turnout of 45.7%. In the 2009 gubernatorial election, Democrat Jon Corzine received 1,682 ballots cast (60.7% vs. 48.0% countywide), ahead of Republican Chris Christie with 901 votes (32.5% vs. 45.8%), Independent Chris Daggett with 120 votes (4.3% vs. 4.7%) and other candidates with 7 votes (0.3% vs. 0.5%), among the 2,773 ballots cast by the borough's 4,880 registered voters, yielding a 56.8% turnout (vs. 50.0% in the county).

United States Senate election results for Leonia1
Year	Republican		Democratic		Third party(ies)	
Year	No.	%	No.	%	No.	%
2024	1,055	27.95%	2,634	69.77%	86	2.28%
2018	847	28.95%	1,989	67.98%	90	3.08%
2012	975	28.92%	2,335	69.27%	61	1.81%
2006	811	30.64%	1,804	68.15%	32	1.21%

United States Senate election results for Leonia2
Year	Republican		Democratic		Third party(ies)	
Year	No.	%	No.	%	No.	%
2020	1,205	27.80%	3,050	70.37%	79	1.82%
2014	628	30.59%	1,393	67.85%	32	1.56%
2013	410	28.35%	1,021	70.61%	15	1.04%
2008	1,167	32.99%	2,329	65.85%	41	1.16%

== Education ==
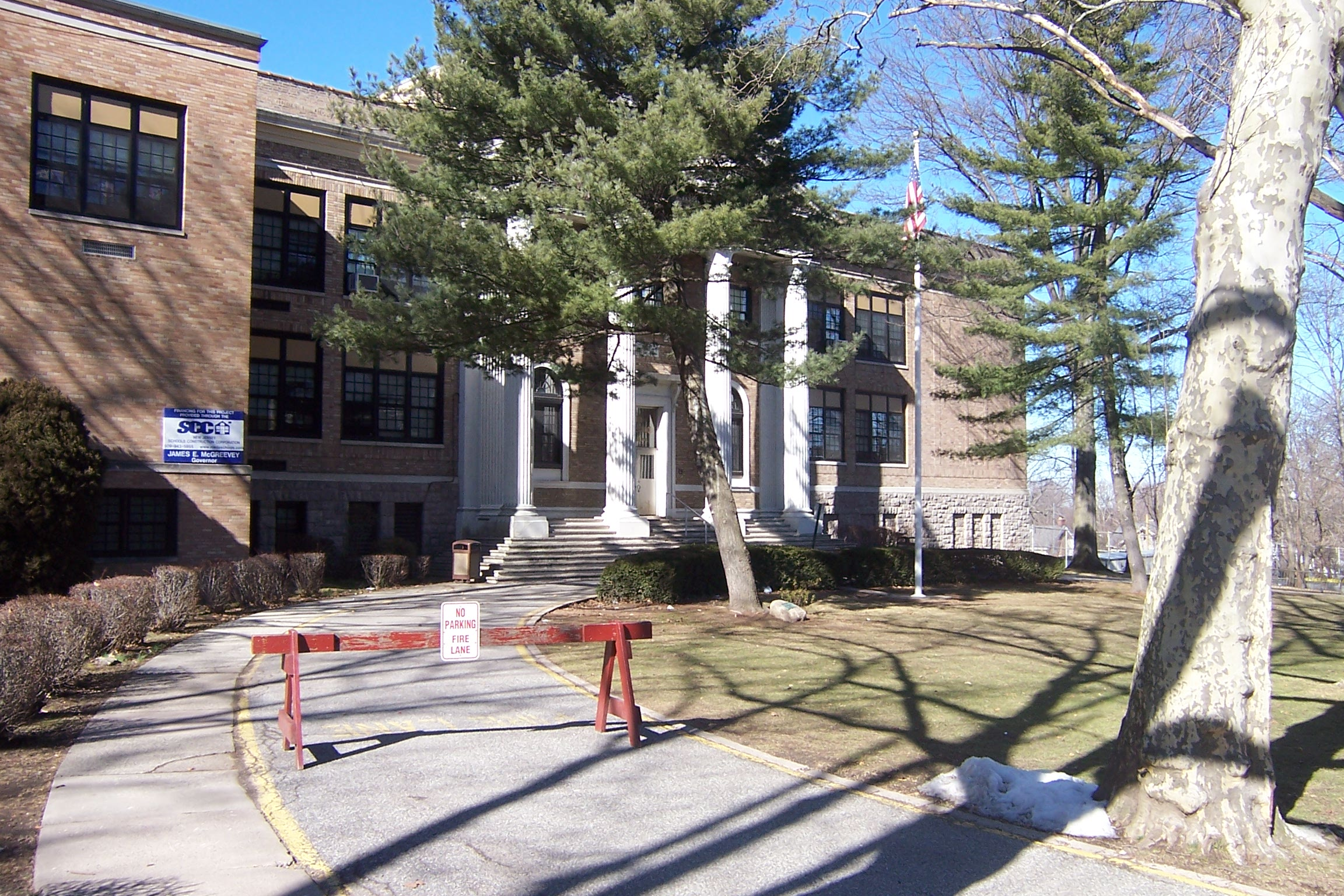
Once Leonia High School, now Leonia Middle School

Leonia is served by its public system and by a number of private schools.

The Leonia Public Schools serve students from pre-kindergarten through twelfth grade. As of the 2023–24 school year, the district, comprised of three schools, had an enrollment of 2,087 students and 191.6 classroom teachers (on an FTE basis), for a student–teacher ratio of 10.9:1. Schools in the district (with 2023–24 enrollment data from the National Center for Education Statistics) are Anna C. Scott Elementary School with 565 students in grades PreK–4, Leonia Middle School with 675 students in grades 5–8 and Leonia High School with 814 students in grades 9–12. Students from Edgewater attend the district's schools for grades 7–12 as part of a sending/receiving relationship with the Edgewater Public Schools.

Public school students from the borough, and all of Bergen County, are eligible to attend the secondary education programs offered by the Bergen County Technical Schools, which include the Bergen County Academies in Hackensack, and the Bergen Tech campus in Teterboro or Paramus. The district offers programs on a shared-time or full-time basis, with admission based on a selective application process and tuition covered by the student's home school district.

St. John the Evangelist School was a Catholic school for students in grades Pre-K–8, operating under the supervision of the Roman Catholic Archdiocese of Newark. After 72 years and generations of graduates, it was closed in June 2013.

== Transportation ==
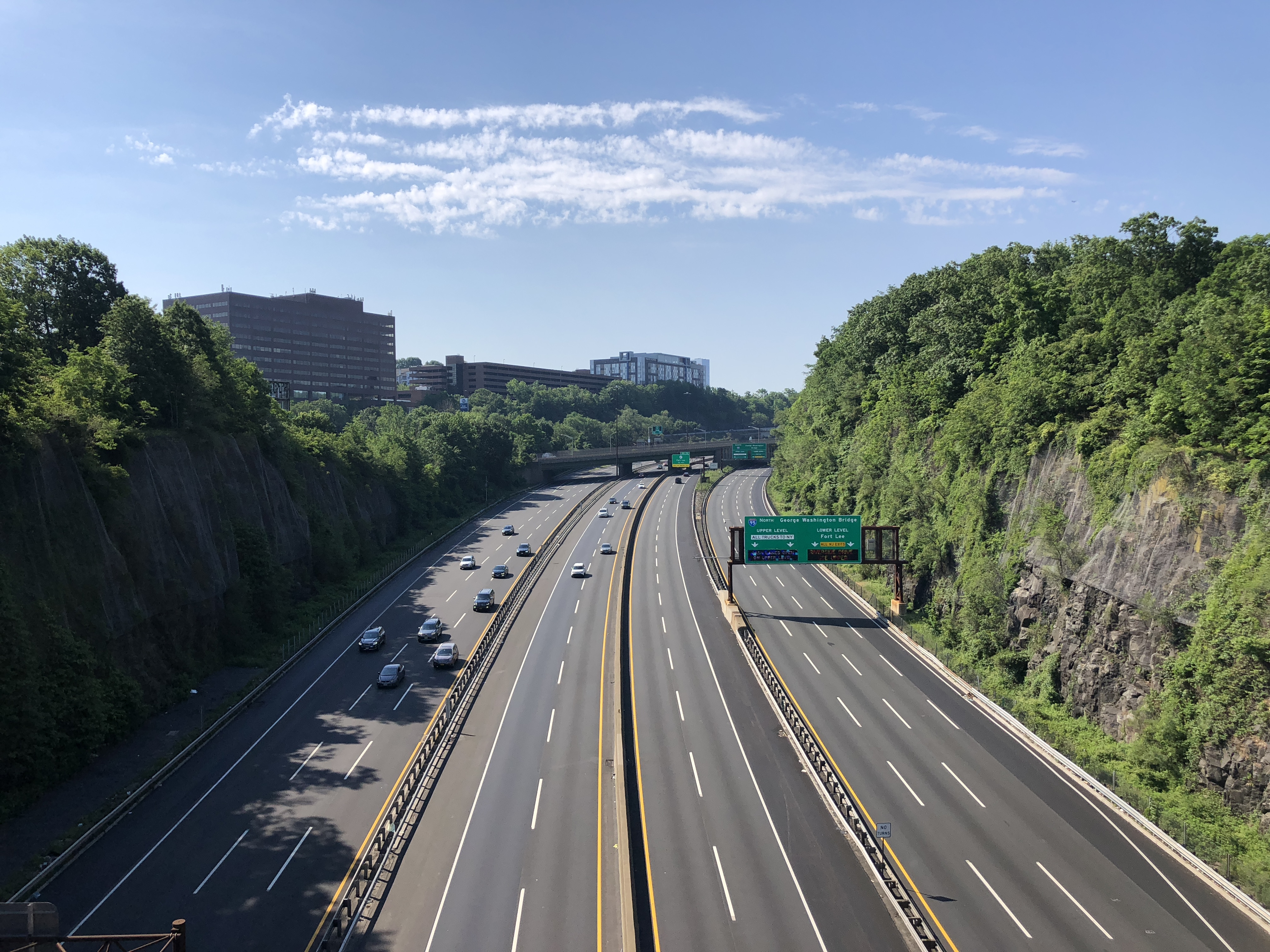
Interstate 95 (the New Jersey Turnpike) northbound in Leonia, taken from the Edgewood Road Bridge

=== Roads and highways ===
As of May 2010, the borough had 23.02 miles (37.05 km) of roadways, of which 19.53 miles (31.43 km) were maintained by the municipality, 1.12 miles (1.80 km) by Bergen County, 1.56 miles (2.51 km) by the New Jersey Department of Transportation and 0.81 miles (1.30 km) by the New Jersey Turnpike Authority.

Route 93 (Grand Avenue) runs north-south for 1.5 miles (2.4 km) through the center of the borough, connecting Palisades Park and Englewood. Interstate 95 (the New Jersey Turnpike) curves along the borough's northern border while U.S. Route 1/9 and U.S. Route 46 briefly enter along the western border with Fort Lee.

Effective January 22, 2018, Leonia officials banned nonresidents from using residential streets (defined as all streets except Fort Lee Road, Grand Avenue, and Broad Avenue) during rush hours. But due to complaints from business owners citing decreased revenues, Leonia officials are reconsidering.

=== Public transportation ===
NJ Transit bus route 166 provides local and express service from Broad Avenue to the Port Authority Bus Terminal in Midtown Manhattan, and route 182 serves the George Washington Bridge Bus Terminal, with local service offered on the 751, 755 and 756 routes.

Rockland Coaches provides service to the Port Authority Bus Terminal on several routes.

The Northern Branch Corridor Project is a proposal to extend the Hudson-Bergen Light Rail to restore passenger train service on the CSX tracks, which offered passenger service decades before and is now used for occasional freight service. NJ Transit's plan would include a station in Leonia.

== Notable people ==
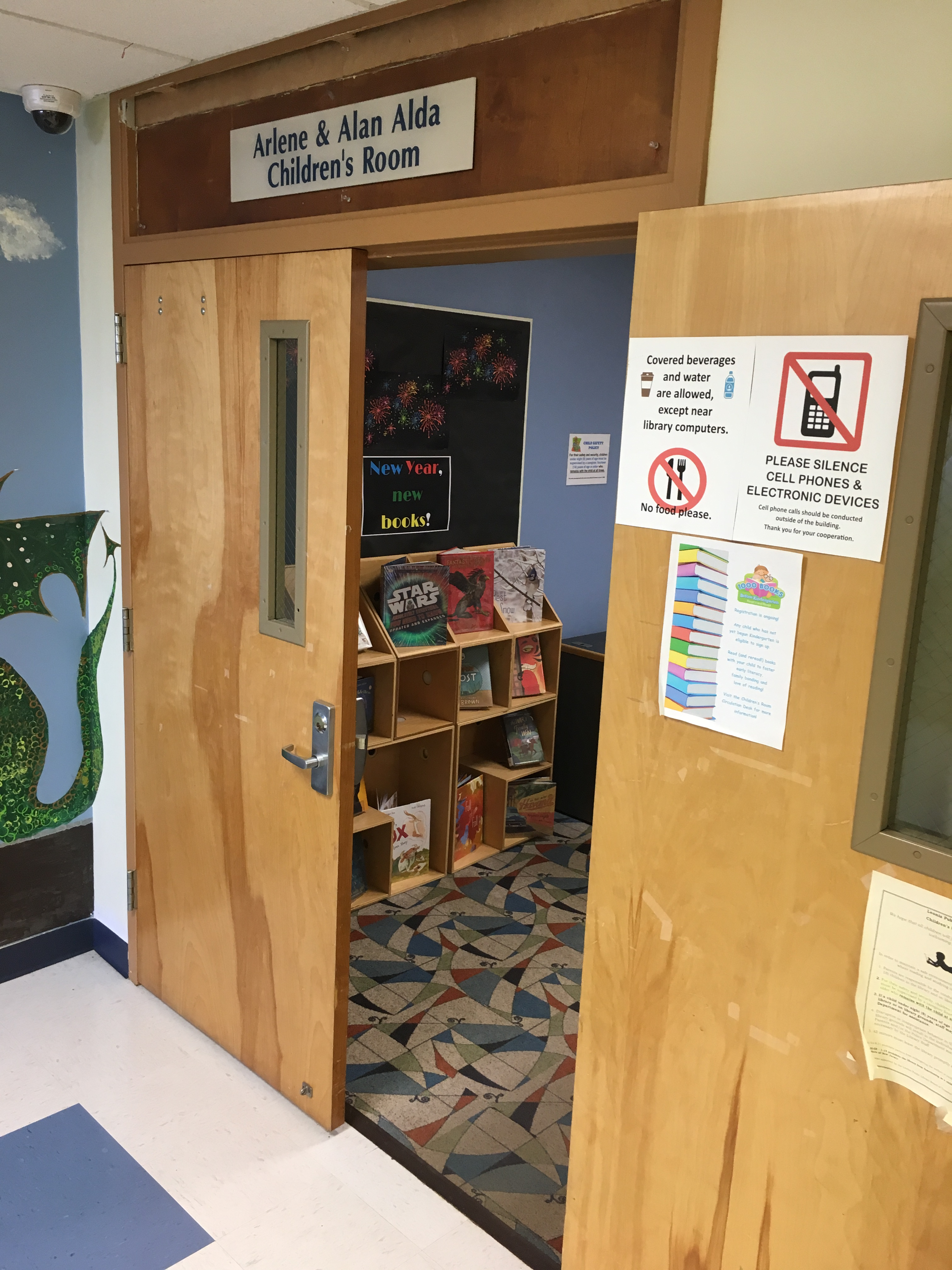
The Arlene & Alan Alda Children's Room at the Leonia Public Library

People who were born in, residents of, or otherwise closely associated with Leonia include:

- Ailee (born 1989), singer
- Alan Alda (born 1936), actor
- Arlene Alda (born 1933), photographer and author
- Robert J. Alexander (1918–2010), political activist who studied the trade union movement in Latin America and dissident communist political parties
- Elizabeth Baranger (1927–2019), physicist and academic administrator at the University of Pittsburgh, whose research concerned shell model calculations in nuclear physics
- Freddie Bartholomew (1924–1992), child actor
- Betty Baur (1919–2006), novelist and short story writer
- Jeff Bell (1943–2018), Republican nominee for U.S. Senate from New Jersey in 2014
- Robert Birmelin (born 1933), figurative painter, printmaker and draughtsman
- Pat Boone (born 1934), singer
- Anthony Bourdain (1956–2018), chef, author and television personality
- Rutherford Boyd (1884–1951), artist
- Verona Burkhard (1910–2004), artist, known for her murals painted for the U.S. Treasury Department
- Brendan A. Burns (1895–1989), U.S. Army major general
- Robert Burr (1922–2000), film, stage and television actor
- Carolee Carmello (born 1962), actress
- Charles Shepard Chapman (1879–1962), painter best remembered for his landscape of the Grand Canyon at the American Museum of Natural History
- Kathleen Clark, playwright
- Edwin H. Colbert (1905–2001), paleontologist and author
- Dan Colen (born 1979), artist
- Paul Collins (born 1956), rock musician and author, best known for his work in the power pop groups The Nerves and The Beat
- Robin Cook (born 1940), physician and novelist
- Sam Coppola (1932–2012), actor who played hardware store owner 'Dan Fusco' in the 1977 film Saturday Night Fever
- Alexander Dallin (1924–2000), historian, political scientist, and international relations scholar at Columbia University
- John Darrow (1907–1980), actor of the late silent and early talking film eras
- Sammy Davis Jr. (1925–1990), entertainer
- Wm Theodore de Bary (1919–2017), Sinologist and East Asian literary scholar who was a professor and administrator at Columbia University for nearly 70 years
- Priscilla Dean (1896–1987), actress popular in silent film as well as in theatre, with a career spanning two decades
- Dorothy Dinnerstein (1923–1992), feminist activist, author and academic
- Acheson J. Duncan (1904–1995), statistician and authority in quality control
- Harvey Dunn (1884–1952), illustrator
- Gregg Edelman (born 1958), actor
- Emme (born 1963), plus-size model
- Enrico Fermi (1901–1954), Nobel Prize–winning physicist
- Morton Fried (1923–1986), professor of anthropology at Columbia University
- Ralph Fuller (1890–1963), cartoonist best known for his long running comic strip Oaky Doaks
- Maria Goeppert Mayer (1906–1972), Nobel Prize-winning physicist
- Buddy Hackett (1924–2003), comedian
- Marvin Harris (1927–2001), anthropologist

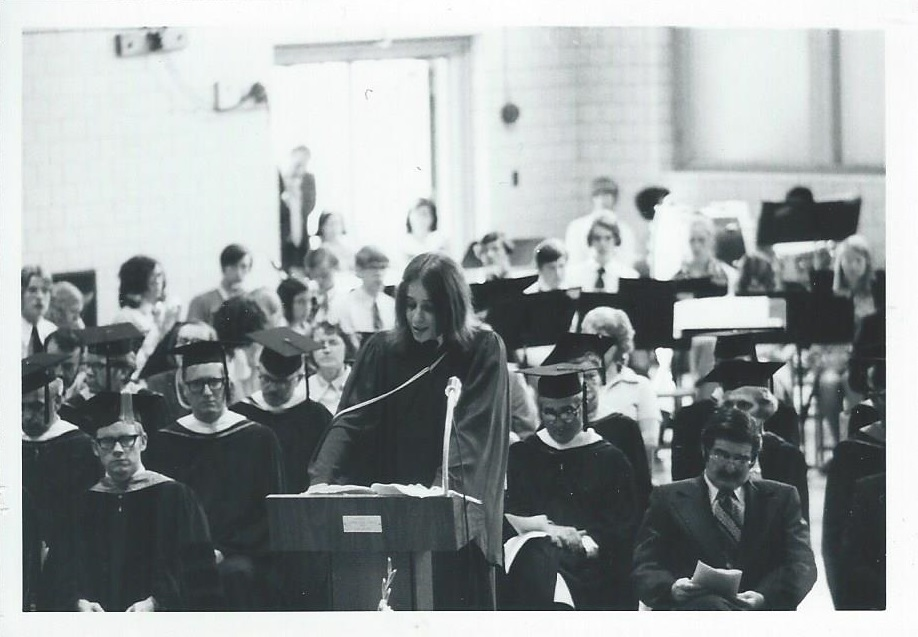
Toomas Hendrik Ilves giving a commencement address at Leonia High School's graduation in 1972

- Richard Howell (born 1955), a freelance comics artist who drew the second series of Marvel Comics' The Vision and the Scarlet Witch, which was primarily set in Leonia
- Toomas Hendrik Ilves (born 1953), President of Estonia
- Phil Jackson (born 1945), basketball coach
- Leland Jacobs (1907–1992), professor emeritus of education who was known for his education in the field of prose and poetry
- Sid Jacobson (1929–2022), comic books writer who was managing editor and editor-in-chief for Harvey Comics
- Albert Journeay (1890–1972), football player who was captain of the Penn Quakers football team in 1914
- Marshall Kay (1904–1975), geologist and professor at Columbia University
- Marvin Kitman (1929–2023), television critic, humorist, and author
- Bob Klapisch, sportswriter
- David Klass, screenwriter and novelist
- Perri Klass, pediatrician and writer who has published extensively about her medical training and pediatric practice
- Dick Kryhoski (1925–2007), first baseman who played in Major League Baseball for five different teams between 1949 and 1955
- George Lefferts (1921–2018), writer, producer, playwright, poet, and director
- Harold Lehman (1913-2006), artist known for his Post-Surrealist paintings, work with the Mexican muralist, David Alfaro Siqueiros, and mural artist who created murals for the WPA at Rikers Island Penitentiary and the Renovo, Pennsylvania, post office.
- Willard Libby (1908–1980), Nobel Prize–winning scientist who played a lead role in the development of radiocarbon dating
- Robert Ludlum (1927–2001), author
- Philip Maneval (born 1956), composer
- David Mansfield (born 1956), stringed-instrument musician and composer
- Vera Maxwell (1901–1995), fashion designer
- John C. McCloy (1876–1945), sailor twice awarded the Medal of Honor
- Bob McFadden (1923–2000), voiceover actor
- Boris Moishezon (1937–1993), mathematician
- J. Vreeland Moore (1824–1903), brigadier general of the 1st New Jersey Regiment who played a major role in the borough's formation
- Robert F. Murphy (1924–1990), anthropologist
- Norman D. Newell (1909–2005), professor of geology at Columbia University, and chairman and curator of invertebrate paleontology at the American Museum of Natural History
- James Noble (1922–2016), actor
- Christiane Noll (born 1968), singer and actress known for her work in musicals and on the concert stage
- Frank C. Osmers Jr. (1907–1977), represented New Jersey's 9th congressional district from 1939 to 1943 and 1951–1965
- Clara Elsene Peck (1883–1968), illustrator and painter known for her illustrations of women and children in the early 20th century
- Mary Beth Peil (born 1940), actress
- Howard Post (1926–2010), animator, cartoonist and comic strip /comic book writer-artist, known for his syndicated newspaper comic strip The Dropouts.
- Carmel Quinn (1925–2021), singer
- Will Ramos (born 1993/94), singer who is the lead vocalist of the deathcore band Lorna Shore
- Lucinda Rosenfeld (born 1969), novelist
- Ben Ryan (1892–1968), songwriter who wrote the music and lyrics to the popular song (The Gang that Sang) Heart of My Heart
- Giorgio Santelli (1897–1985), fencer and fencing master who was part of the Italian team that won the gold medal in Men's team sabre at the 1920 Summer Olympics and was the largest mid-20th century influence in raising the quality and popularity of fencing in the United States
- Warner R. Schilling (1925–2013), political scientist and international relations scholar at Columbia University
- Gene Shalit (1926–2026), longtime film critic on network television
- Willa Shalit (born 1955), artist, theatrical and television producer, photographer, author/editor, and social conscious entrepreneur
- Arshavir Shirakian (1900–1973), Armenian writer who was noted for his assassination of Said Halim Pasha and Cemal Azmi as an act of vengeance for their roles in the Armenian genocide
- Ivory Sully (born 1957), NFL football player for Los Angeles Rams and Tampa Bay Buccaneers
- Al B. Sure! (born 1968), singer, songwriter and producer
- David Syrett (1939–2004), Professor of History at Queens College and researcher and documentary editor on eighteenth-century British naval history and the Battle of the Atlantic during World War II
- Harold Urey (1893–1981), Nobel Prize–winning chemist
- Henry S. Walbridge (1801–1869), member of the United States House of Representatives from New York who served from 1851 to 1852
- Lynd Ward (1905–1985), illustrator and wordless novelist
- Lyndon Woodside (1935–2005), 10th conductor of the Oratorio Society of New York
- George Yevick (1922–2011), physicist and inventor

== In popular culture ==
Leonia briefly served as the home of Scarlet Witch and Vision in several Marvel Comics storylines from the 1980s, mainly in The Vision and the Scarlet Witch series, the second of which was drawn by Leonia resident Richard Howell.

== See also ==
- List of U.S. cities with significant Korean-American populations

== Sources ==
- Municipal Incorporations of the State of New Jersey (according to Counties) prepared by the Division of Local Government, Department of the Treasury (New Jersey); December 1, 1958.
- Clayton, W. Woodford; and Nelson, William. History of Bergen and Passaic Counties, New Jersey, with Biographical Sketches of Many of its Pioneers and Prominent Men. Philadelphia: Everts and Peck, 1882.
- Harvey, Cornelius Burnham (ed.), Genealogical History of Hudson and Bergen Counties, New Jersey. New York: New Jersey Genealogical Publishing Co., 1900.
- Karels, Carol. Leonia, Images of America Series, Arcadia Publishing, 2002. ISBN 0-7385-0973-6.
- Mattingly, Paul H. Suburban Landscapes: Culture and Politics in a New York Metropolitan Community. Johns Hopkins University Press, 2001. ISBN 0-8018-6680-4.
- Van Valen, James M. History of Bergen County, New Jersey. New York: New Jersey Publishing and Engraving Co., 1900.
- Westervelt, Frances A. (Frances Augusta), 1858–1942, History of Bergen County, New Jersey, 1630–1923, Lewis Historical Publishing Company, 1923.
