= J. Vreeland Moore =

James Vreeland Moore (August 18, 1824– July 8, 1903) was a brevet brigadier general in the New Jersey Militia, and a Captain of the 1st New Jersey Regiment, aka "the Jersey Blues" in the Civil War. He played a major role in the history of Leonia, New Jersey. A resident of Leonia for over 50 years, he was a member of the first council which was formed when Leonia was incorporated as a borough in 1894. He served as council president for two terms, 1894-1896.

Moore served as secretary of the Universalist Sunday School Union in the 1840s and as clerk of the New York Universalist State Convention in the 1850s.

Moore died in Leonia on July 8, 1903, at the age of 79. In Leonia, the roads Vreeland Avenue and Moore Avenue were named after him.
