= Charles Shepard Chapman =

American painter

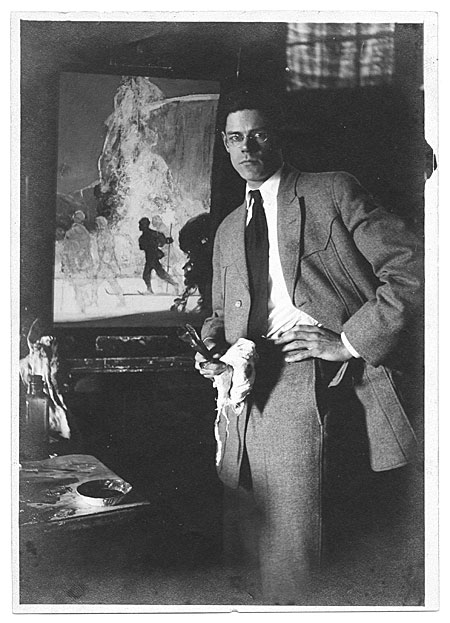
- Charles Shepard Chapman c. 1920
- Born: June 2, 1879; Morristown, New York
- Died: December 15, 1962 (aged 83); Leonia, New Jersey
- Education: Pratt Institute, Art Students' League, Chase School
- Known for: painting, drawing

Charles Shepard Chapman (June 2, 1879 – December 15, 1962) was an American painter, perhaps best remembered for his landscape of the Grand Canyon at the American Museum of Natural History.

== Early life and education ==
Chapman was born in Morristown, New York. He studied at the New York School of Art, under the mentor-ship of Walter Appleton Clark and William Merritt Chase. He also studied at the Ogdensburg Free Academy and Pratt Institute, and taught at the Art Students League.

== Career ==
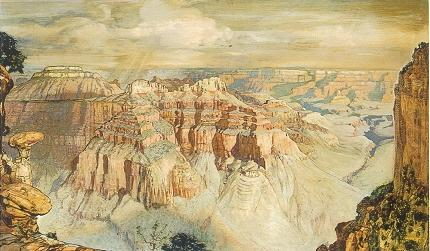
Grand Canyon

Around 1910, Chapman moved to Leonia, New Jersey, where he maintained his home and studio and ran a school teaching illustration for a few years with Harvey Dunn. He was a teacher at the Art Students League school in Manhattan. Chapman also taught at the University of Wyoming. In the 1930s and 1940s, Chapman also taught art intermittently in his hometown of Morristown.
