= Rutherford Boyd =

American sculptor, painter and illustrator

John Rutherford Boyd
- Born: 1882; Philadelphia, Pennsylvania, US
- Died: 1951 (aged 68–69); Leonia, New Jersey, US
- Occupations: American sculptor, painter and illustrator
- Partner: Harriet A. Repplier
- Children: 2

John Rutherford Boyd (1882–1951) was a 20th-century American sculptor, painter and illustrator.

== Life ==
Boyd was born in 1882 in Philadelphia, Pennsylvania, and attended the Pennsylvania Academy of the Fine Arts, where he studied under Thomas Anshutz.

He worked as a commercial illustrator in Philadelphia, and was art director for the magazine The Ladies' Home Journal from 1909 to 1915. He moved to New York City to become art director for Everybody's Magazine. Boyd revamped the magazine's layout under editor Howard Wheeler, but both their tenures at Everybody's were short. Boyd next worked as art director at Squibb & Company (now Bristol-Myers Squibb). He attended evening classes at the Art Students League of New York.

His illustration work appeared on the covers of national magazines, including The Saturday Evening Post. During the 1920s and 1930s, he exhibited regularly at the annual International Exhibition of Watercolors at the Art Institute of Chicago. He was a member of the American Watercolor Society, the Salmagundi Club, and the Architectural League of New York.

Although his commercial art was realistic, he also created abstract sculptures and drawings. These intensely geometric works were the subject of a 1937 short film, Parabola, by Mary Ellen Bute and Ted Nemeth, with music by Darius Milhaud. At the invitation of abstract artist Josef Albers, Boyd was a guest lecturer at Black Mountain College in North Carolina. With his friend J. Ernest G. Yalden, he designed the Yalden Memorial Sundial (1937), at Waterfront Park, in Woods Hole, Massachusetts.

He married fellow PAFA alumna Harriet A. Repplier, and they had two children, Lydia, born 1914 and David, born 1918. The couple bought the Cole-Allaire House at 112 Prospect Street in Leonia, New Jersey in 1916, and spent three years restoring it. They renamed it "Boyd's Nest," and lived there until their deaths. The house is now listed on the National Register of Historic Places.

His watercolor, Flower Garden, Irises and Poppies (1929), sold at Sotheby's New York, on September 24, 2008, for $43,750 – an auction record for the artist.

He died in 1951 in Leonia, New Jersey.
