= William C. Moore =

United States Army general

William Charles Moore
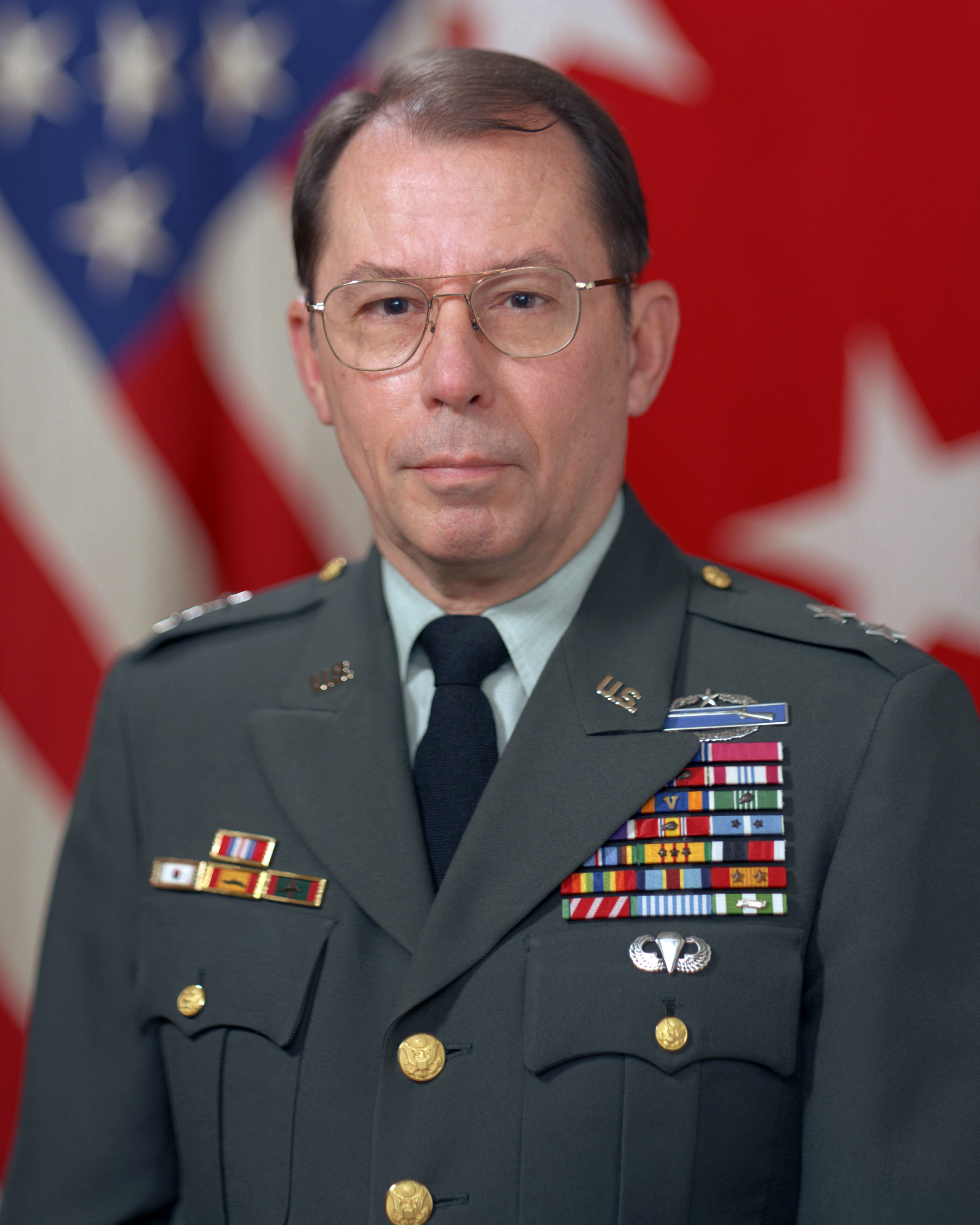
- Born: April 13, 1929 (age 97); Akron, Ohio U.S.
- Military career
- Allegiance: United States
- Branch: United States Army
- Service years: 1952–1987
- Rank: Major general
- Commands: Berlin Brigade; 3rd Brigade, 2nd Infantry Division; 2nd Battalion, 35th Infantry Regiment
- Conflicts: Vietnam War; Korean War

William Charles Moore (born April 13, 1929) is a retired major general in the United States Army. He served as Director of Operations, Readiness and Mobilization in the Office of the Deputy Chief of Staff for Operations and Plans. He graduated from the United States Military Academy with a B.S. degree in military science in 1952. Moore was awarded two Bronze Star Medals for his service as an infantry officer during the Korean War and three Silver Star Medals for his service as commander of the 2nd Battalion, 35th Infantry Regiment during the Vietnam War.
