= Outline of library and information science =

Overview of and topical guide to library science

The following outline is provided as an overview of and topical guide to library and information science:

Library and information science (LIS) is the socio-technical studies of issues related to libraries and the information fields. This includes academic studies regarding how library resources are used and how people interact with library systems. The organization of knowledge for efficient retrieval of relevant information is also a major research goal of library science. Given its interdisciplinary nature, it overlaps with the fields of computer science, various social sciences, statistics, and systems analysis.

== Nature of library and information science ==
=== Definition ===
Library and information science can be described as all of the following:

- The study of libraries and information both in terms of theory and practice.
- Field of science – widely recognized category of specialized expertise within science, and typically embodies its own terminology and nomenclature. Such a field will usually be represented by one or more scientific journals, where peer reviewed research is published. There are many library and information-related scientific journals.
  - Social science – field of academic scholarship that explores aspects of human society.

=== Essence ===
- Library and information science
  - Library science
  - Information science
- Glossary of library and information science
- Cataloging
- Classification
- Information architecture
- Librarian
- Library

== Branches of library and information science ==
- Archival science
- Bibliographic databases
- Cataloging
- Library instruction
- Preservation
- Readers' advisory
- Reference

== Types of library and information professionals ==
- Librarian
  - Application specialist – see integrated library system
  - Cataloguing librarian – see library catalog
  - Collections librarian – see library collection development
  - Electronic resources librarian – see electronic resource management
  - Law librarian – expert in legal research
  - Metadata librarian – see metadata
  - Reference librarian – helps patrons with research
  - Research instruction librarian – see library instruction
  - Teacher-librarian
- Archivist
- Curator
- Indexer
- Information architect
- Information consultant (may be a qualified librarian)
- Prospect researcher
- Records manager (see Records management)

== History of library and information science ==
History of library science

- History of Information Science
- List of larger libraries in the ancient world

== Types of libraries ==
- Academic library
- Archive
- Digital library
- National library
  - List of national libraries
- Public library
  - Carnegie library
- Research library
- School library
- Special library

== Specific libraries ==
- List of libraries

== Library and information resources ==
Document

=== Information media ===
- Audiobook
- Bibliographic database
- Book
  - List of books
- Bookmark
- Braille book
- CD-ROM
- Clay tablet
- Codex
- Compact audio cassette
- Compact disc
- DVD
- Ebook
- Film Stock
- Gramophone record
- Information architecture
- Laserdisc
- Magnetic tape
- Manuscript
- Map
- Microfiche
- Microfilm
- Microprint
- Newsgroup
- Newspaper
- Pamphlet
- Phonograph cylinder
- Photograph
- Scroll (parchment)
- Sheet music
- Slide library
- Videotape
- Web site
- Wire recording

=== Types of publications ===
- Academic journal
- Almanac
  - List of almanacs
- Atlas
- Comic book
- Dictionary
- Encyclopedia
  - Lists of encyclopedias
- Gazetteer
- Graphic novel
- Lexicon
- Magazine
- Newspaper
  - Specific newspapers
- Reference work
- Serial
- Series of books
- Telephone directory
- Thesaurus

=== Catalogs and indexes ===
- AACR2
- Accession number
- Authority control
- Bliss bibliographic classification
- Classification
- Collation
- Colon classification
- Colophon
- Dewey Decimal Classification
- Controlled vocabulary
- Index
- International Standard Bibliographic Description
- Library catalog
- Library of Congress Classification
- Machine Readable Cataloging
- NUCMC
- OCLC
- OPAC
- Resource Description and Access
- Subject
- Universal Decimal Classification
- WorldCat

== Information science ==
- Glossary of information science terms
- Human-computer interaction
- Integrated library system
- Evidence-based library and information practice

=== Organization of information ===
- Cataloging and classification
  - List of Catalogs and indexes
  - Subject indexing
  - Taxonomic classification
  - Scientific classification
  - Statistical classification
  - Security classification
  - Film classification
- Categorization
- Data modeling
- Knowledge management/ Knowledge engineering
- Information architecture
- Information system

=== Electronic information storage and retrieval ===
- Data storage
  - Boolean expression
  - Computer storage
  - Data management
  - Data storage device
  - Database
  - Digital library
  - Document management
  - Expert system
  - Fuzzy logic
  - Geographic Information System
  - Invisible web
  - Keyword
  - Knowledge management
  - Memory
  - Metadata
  - OpenURL
  - Precision
  - Recall
  - Semantic web
  - XML
- Information retrieval
  - Controlled vocabulary
  - Cross-language information retrieval
  - Digital libraries
  - Document classification
  - Educational psychology
  - Federated search
  - Full text search
  - Geographic information system
  - Information extraction
  - Information seeking
  - Knowledge visualization
  - Question answering
  - Search engines
  - Search index
  - tf-idf

=== Infometrics ===
- Bibliometrics – studies quantitative aspects of recorded information
- Webometrics – studies quantitative aspects of the World Wide Web
- Cybermetrics – similar to webometrics, but broadens its definition to include electronic resources

==== Scientometrics ====
Scientometrics – studies quantitative aspects of science

- Bradford's law
- Citation
- Data mining
- Impact factor
- Information retrieval
- Peer review
- Web mining

=== Informatics ===
Informatics

- Bioinformatics
- Biodiversity Informatics
- Biomedical informatics
- Business Informatics
- Ecoinformatics
- Cheminformatics
- Community informatics
- Geoinformatics
- Health informatics
- Laboratory informatics
- Neuroinformatics
- Social informatics

=== Information and society ===
- Information society
- Censorship
- Copyright
- Freedom of Information Act
- Information access
- Intellectual freedom
- Intellectual property
- Literacy
- USA PATRIOT Act
- Open source
- Privacy
- Cultural studies
- Technological determinism
- Groupware
- Human-computer interaction
- Information ethics
- Usability engineering/ User-centered design

== Library operations and management ==
Library management –

- Five laws of library science
- Information
- Information literacy
- Knowledge management

=== Research methods ===
- Bibliography
- Digital reference services
- Genealogy
- Reference works
- Library reference desk
- Reference interview
- Research
- Museme

==== Organizing and searching Wikipedia ====
- Wikipedia resources for researchers
- Wikipedia:Categorization
- Wikipedia:Citing Wikipedia
- Wikipedia:Common words, searching for which is not possible
- Wikipedia:How to explore Wikipedia
- Wikipedia:Naming conventions (and its subpages)
- Wikipedia:Searching
- Wikipedia:WikiProject Fact and Reference Check

=== Selection and acquisition of library materials ===
- Children's literature
- Information explosion
- ISBN
- ISSN
- Library acquisitions
- Library collection development
- Literature
- Public Lending Right
- Young adult literature

=== Preservation ===
Preservation

- Archival science
- Archive
- Archivist
- Art conservation and restoration
- Conservation
- Curator
- Digital preservation
- Film preservation
- Historic preservation
- Library binding
- Mass deacidification
- Preservationist
- Slow fire

=== Other library services and processes ===
- Bookmobile
- Interlibrary loan
- Library circulation
- Library portal
- Library technical services
- RFID
- Reference management software

== Politics of library science ==
- Government information
- REFORMA

=== Legal issues ===
- Censorship
- Copyright
- Intellectual freedom
- Intellectual property
- Intellectual property rights
- Intellectual freedom
- Legal deposit
- Library Bill of Rights
- Open access (publishing)
- Public lending right
- Serials crisis

==== Laws ====
- Children's Internet Protection Act
- Digital Millennium Copyright Act
- Freedom of Information Act
- Patriot Act
- USA PATRIOT Act

==== Legal precedents ====
- New York Times Company v. Tasini

=== Social issues ===
- Decreased funding for established libraries
- Digital divide
- Digitization
- Education for librarianship
- Information access
- Information and communication technologies (ICT's)
  - Sustainability and ICT's
- Information explosion
- Information policy
- Information literacy
- Information Society
- Literacy
- Remote access

== Education and training ==
Education for librarianship –

- List of I-Schools

Academic courses in library science

- Collection management
- Cataloging and classification
- Database management
- Information architecture
- Information systems and technology
- Knowledge management
- List of Library Science schools
- Management
- Preservation
- Reference
- Research methods
- Statistics

== Professional organizations ==
- American Association of School Librarians
- American Library Association
- Australian Library and Information Association
- Canadian Library Association
- Association for Library Service to Children
- Association of Research Libraries
- International Federation of Library Associations (IFLA)
- Public Library Association
- Special Libraries Association

== Non-profit organizations ==
- Librarians Without Borders
- Bibliothèques Sans Frontières
- African Library Project
- Friends of Libraries

== Notable people in library science ==
- List of librarians
- Librarians in popular culture
- Sanford Berman
- Daniel J. Boorstin
- William Warner Bishop
- Lee Pierce Butler
- John Cotton Dana
- Melvil Dewey
- John Fiske (philosopher)
- Michael Gorman
- Seymour Lubetzky
- Eric Moon
- Paul Evan Peters
- S. R. Ranganathan
- Jesse Shera
- Howard D. White

== List of Topic in Library School ==
- Collection Development
- Information Literacy
- Digital Libraries
- Library Management
- Cataloging and Classification
- Information Retrieval
- Library Automation
- Reference Services
- Database Management
- Knowledge Management
- Digital Scholarship
- Library Marketing
- Community Outreach
- Information Architecture
- Taxonomy and Ontology
- User Experience (UX)
- Library Assessment
- Information Policy
- Copyright and Licensing
- Open Access
- Digital Preservation
- Data Curation
- Library Instruction
- Information Systems
- Collection Maintenance
- Interlibrary Loan
- Library Consortia
- Information Literacy Instruction
- Digital Asset Management
- Library Space Planning
- Information Ethics
- Library Outreach
- Community Engagement
- Information Literacy Standards
- Digital Library Software
- Library Website Design
- Online Public Access Catalogs (OPACs)
- Library Discovery Layers
- Information Literacy Assessment
- Library Impact Studies
- Information Literacy Curriculum
- Digital Scholarship Centers
- Library Makerspaces
- Information Literacy Frameworks
- Library Support for Research
- Digital Humanities
- Library Data Analytics
- Information Literacy and Critical Thinking
- Library Support for Student Success
- Library Instruction for Diverse Populations
- Information Literacy and Digital Citizenship
- Library Services for People with Disabilities
- Information Literacy and Media Literacy
- Library Support for Entrepreneurship
- Information Literacy and Critical Library Instruction
- Library Services for Underserved Communities
- Information Literacy and Transliteracy

== See also ==
- Wikipedia:WikiProject Libraries
- Category:Library science journals
- Category:Library science magazines
- Wikiproject BID (library, information, documentation) at the German Wikipedia
- Portail SID (information literacy and libraries) at the French Wikipedia.
- How to find a book on Wikibooks
- Document management system
- Grey literature
- History of public library advocacy
- Informatics
- Library of Congress
- Library anxiety
- OCLC
- Preservation (library and archive)
- Public library advocacy
- Serials, periodicals and journals
- The works of Michael Gorman
