= Jean Coleman =

Jean Coleman may refer to:

- Jean Coleman (officer) (1908–1982), member of the British Special Operations Executive
- Jean Coleman (athlete) (1918–2008), Australian sprinter
- Jean Ellen Coleman, American librarian
