= Mary Somerville (disambiguation) =

Mary Somerville (1780–1872) was a Scottish scientist, writer, and polymath.

Mary Somerville may also refer to:

- Mary R. Somerville, American librarian
- Mary Somerville (broadcasting executive) (1897–1963), New Zealand-born British pedagogue and broadcasting executive
- Mary Somerville (1834 ship), British merchant ship
