= Kranich =

Kranich is a German language surname with the meaning crane. Notable people with the surname include:

- Burchard Kranich (1515–1578), German mining engineer
- Heiki Kranich (1961–2026), Estonian politician
- Jami Kranich (born 1992), American soccer player and coach
- Nancy C. Kranich, American librarian
- Ursula Groden-Kranich (born 1965), German politician
