= Amit Schejter =

Israeli professor

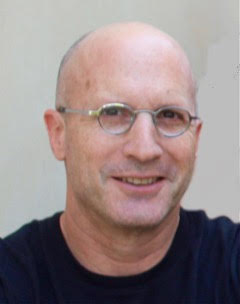
- Born: 1961 (age 64–65); Philadelphia, Pennsylvania, United States
- Citizenship: U.S., Israeli
- Scientific career
- Fields: Communication Studies
- Workplaces: Oranim Academic College, Ben-Gurion University of the Negev, Pennsylvania State University
- Doctoral advisor: Jorge Reina Schement
- Website: BGU

Amit Schejter (Amit Meshulam Schejter) is Professor of Communication Studies at Ben-Gurion University of the Negev in Israel, where he heads the Young Family School for the Human Experience and Visiting Professor of Communications and co-director of the Institute for Information Policy at the Donald P. Bellisario College of Communications of the Pennsylvania State University. He is the former President of Oranim College.

== Academic career ==
Schejter received his LL.B. from the Hebrew University of Jerusalem in 1986, his M.S. in mass communications from Boston University in 1991 and his Ph.D. in communication and information policy from Rutgers in 1995. Between 1997 and 2000 he was on the faculty at Tel Aviv University. Since 2004 he has been at Penn State and since 2012 at Ben-Gurion University of the Negev where he previously (2014–2018) served as Head of the Department of Communication Studies and as Dean of the Faculty of Humanities and Social Sciences (2018–2020).

His research focuses on the relationship between media and justice. It analyzes how media policies have an effect on the public interest; minority rights; the unequal distribution of communication resources, and the silencing of the public's voice, in particular that of members of marginalized communities. Central among the theoretical approaches to justice he currently investigates is the capabilities approach.

He has also written extensively about media regulation, critiquing policies regarding broadcasting, cable television, public broadcasting, mobile services, and audiovisual services in Israel as well as low power FM, network neutrality and universal service policies in the U.S. As a member of the International Media Concentration Group, he analyzed (with Moran Yemini) media concentration in Israel between 1984 and 2013.

He is the author or editor of 8 books and more than 80 journal articles, law reviews and book chapters in five languages and has been cited in congressional and Knesset hearings. Critics have described his books as deserving of "high praise for their energetic and creative investigation", as "must-read for policy makers, educators, industry leaders and others interested in bringing U.S. communications into the 21st century", and as "display[ing] enviable intellectual courage". In 2017 he received (with Noam Tirosh) the Israel Communication Association's Outstanding Book of the Year Award. He serves as the founding editor of the Journal of Information Policy and was a member of the scientific management of the Israeli Center of Research Excellence (ICORE) "Learning in a NetworKed Society" (LINKS) (2013–2019). Between 2021- 2024 he chaired TPRC - the Conference on Communication, Information and Internet Policy and between 2019- 2025 he was a CITI Fellow at the Columbia Business School.

== Public service ==
Between 1988-1989 and 1992-1993 Schejter served as bureau chief and senior advisor to Israeli ministers of education and culture Yitzhak Navon and Shulamit Aloni. Between 1993 and 1997 he was director of legal affairs and international relations at the Israel Broadcasting Authority where he co-authored the Nakdi Report. In 2000 he was appointed vice president for regulatory affairs at Cellcom (Israel), where he attracted public attention when attacking the government's caving in to pressures of Bezeq, the national telco, and refusing to undergo a polygraph test enforced on the corporation's senior management.

In 2007-2008 he headed the Future of American Telecommunications Working Group, which proposed a telecommunications and media policy agenda for the incoming Obama administration, and he has addressed regulators, and academic audiences worldwide. Most recently, in 2015 he headed a government panel that proposed sweeping changes to the Israeli media industry.

He currently is Chairperson of the Association for Civil Rights in Israel and of the Israel Communication Association and sits on the board of directors of the Jaffa Theatre – The Stage for Arab-Hebrew Culture. He is the founding co-director of the Shulamit Aloni Prize. As an avid fan of Hapoel Tel Aviv he for a few years wrote a popular column on the fans' website and co edited the anthology "התחזית: נפרק אותם", a collection of 300 columns about the team written by the journalist-songwriter Eli Mohar.

== Books ==
- The Wonder Phone in the Land of Miracles: Mobile Telephony in Israel (Hampton Press, 2008) (with Akiba Cohen and Dafna Lemish)
- Muting Israeli Democracy: How Media and Cultural Policy Undermine Freedom of Expression (University of Illinois Press, 2009)
- ... And Communications for All: A Policy Agenda for a New Administration (Lexington Books, 2009)
- Beyond Broadband Access: Developing Data-Based Information Policy Strategies (Fordham University, 2013) (with Richard D. Taylor)
- Media in Transition (Tzivonim Publishers, 2015, in Hebrew) in honor of professor Dan Caspi (with Nelly Elias, Galit Nimrod, and Zvi Reich)
- A Justice-Based Approach to New Media Policy (Palgrave Macmillan, 2017) (with Noam Tirosh)
- Learning in a Networked Society: Spontaneous and Designed Technology Enhanced Learning Communities (Springer, 2019) (With Yael Kali and Ayelet Baram Tsabari)
- Digital Capabilities: ICT Adoption in Marginalized Communities in Israel and the West Bank (Palgrave Macmillan, 2023) (With Baruch Shomron, Muhammad Abu-Jaffar, Ghalia Abu Kaf, Amneh Al Sharha, Jonathan Mendels, Shula Mola, Malka Shacham and Noam Tirosh).
- התחזית: נפרק אותם (The Forecast: We Will Beat Them) (self published) An anthology of 300 columns written between 1975 and 2006 by the journalist and songwriter Eli Mohar praising Hapoel Tel-Aviv.
