= Bigwig =

Bigwig may refer to:

- Bigwig (band)
- Bigwig (Watership Down), a character in the novel Watership Down
- BIGWIG (library organization), an interest group of the Library Information and Technology Association, a division of the American Library Association
- long wigs worn as court dress, on special ceremonial occasions
