= John W. Berry (librarian) =

American librarian

President of the American Library Association
- In office 2001–2002
- Preceded by: Nancy C. Kranich
- Succeeded by: Maurice J. Freedman

Personal details
- Born: 1947 (age 78–79)
- Occupation: Librarian

John W. Berry (born 1947) is an American librarian. Berry served as president of the American Library Association from 2001 to 2002, leading the profession's response to the Children's Internet Protection Act.

== Education and career ==
Berry received his Master of Arts in Teaching in 1971 and his Master of Library Science in 1974 from Indiana University Bloomington. He began his career in Illinois in 1980 at the Northern Illinois University libraries.

He served as executive director of the American Library Association's Library Leadership and Management Association from 1985 to 1989.

Berry was the director of advancement and research associate professor at the University of Illinois at Chicago from 1990 to 1996.

He served as the executive director of the Network of Illinois Learning Resources in Community Colleges (NILRC) for almost 15 years, managing a consortium of fifty colleges and universities. He has also held faculty and management positions at Northern Illinois University, Elmira College, and Indiana University.

Berry is a professor in the Graduate School of Library and Information Science at Dominican University, where his courses have included "Great Libraries and Their Collections," International Librarianship, Literacy and Library Involvement and a doctoral seminar on visual literacy. In 2010 he was elected chairman of the board of directors of the Ernest Hemingway Foundation of Oak Park, Illinois. In 2013, Berry was appointed to the board of trustees of the American Library in Paris to represent the American Library Association.

== Library leadership and recognition ==
During his administration as president of the American Library Association (ALA) from 2001 to 2002, Berry's focal points were on library recruitment of strong leaders and bridging the digital divide. He also led an ALA visit to Cuba in 2001 and worked with the Laura Bush Foundation to promote the profession of librarianship.

He was president of the Freedom to Read Foundation from 2005 to 2007.

Berry was named the 2009 Illinois Academic Librarian of the Year and in February 2011 was inducted as an Illinois Library Luminary Honoree by the Illinois Library Association.

Non-profit organization positions
| Preceded by Nancy C. Kranich | President of the American Library Association; 2001–2002 | Succeeded by Maurice J. Freedman |
