= John P. McDonald =

American librarian

- Born: October 17, 1922; Lansdowne, Pennsylvania, US
- Died: November 19, 1993 (aged 71); Storrs, Connecticut
- Education: Drexel University (MLS); University of Virginia (BA)
- Occupations: Librarian, academic administrator
- Employer: University of Connecticut

John Peter McDonald (October 17, 1922 – November 19, 1993) was an American librarian. McDonald served as university librarian and director at the University of Connecticut (1963–74; 1976–86) and executive director of the Association of Research Libraries (1974–76).

== Early life ==
McDonald was born on October 17, 1922, in Lansdowne, Pennsylvania, to parents Edward D. and Marguerite McDonald. According to the 1940 US census, McDonald's father was a teacher, and both parents were born in Ohio. McDonald served four years in the United States Navy during World War II and attained the rank of lieutenant. He was serving in the US Navy Reserve as of 1951. He was a nephew of James Grover McDonald.

== Education ==
McDonald earned a bachelor's degree from the University of Virginia (1946) and a master's degree in library science from Drexel University (1951). He held a Carnegie fellowship at Rutgers University's Library School in 1957–58, where he studied library administration under Keyes Metcalf.

== Career ==
Prior to joining the University of Connecticut as library director in July 1963, McDonald worked in the libraries of the University of Pennsylvania and Washington University in St. Louis, where he served as head of the reference department and then as associate director of libraries.

During his tenure at UConn, McDonald presided over construction of the Homer D. Babbidge Library and grew the library's collections from 450,000 volumes to more than 2.2 million volumes, becoming one of the largest libraries in New England. He took initial steps towards library automation, engaged in state and national library network and resource sharing initiatives, and built strong archival and special collections. He also served as a consultant on buildings and management for libraries and museums across the United States and as far away as Santiago, Chile. McDonald retired as director in 1986 and served for one year as director of library development before retiring for good. He was succeeded by Norman D. Stevens.

McDonald served as president (1971–72) and, while on leave of absence from UConn, executive director (1974–76) of the Association of Research Libraries (ARL). He served on several committees of ARL and the American Library Association (ALA), including ALA Council, the board of directors of the ALA Library Administration Division, and the ALA Nominating Committee.

McDonald was an avid bird watcher and conservationist, serving on the boards of Joshua's Tract Conservation and Historic Trust and the Connecticut Ornithological Society, among other organizations. McDonald's friendship with Edwin Way Teale was instrumental in gaining Teale's papers for UConn's special collections.

== Honors ==
McDonald received an honorary doctor of laws degree from Wesleyan University in 1986, the Outstanding Alumnus Award from the Drexel Library School Alumni Association in 1975, the Distinguished Service Award from the Connecticut Library Association in 1986, and the Leadership Award from the University of Connecticut Alumni Association in 1986.

The John P. McDonald Reading Room located in the Thomas J. Dodd Research Center was named in his honor.

== Personal life ==
McDonald married to Pennsylvania native and Vassar College alumna Josephine Sheppard Herring (1931–2010) in 1951. The couple had two sons. They lived in Storrs, Connecticut.

McDonald died of cancer on November 19, 1993. He was interred in New Storrs Cemetery, on a hill overlooking the UConn campus.
