= Five laws of library science =

Principles of library operations proposed by S. R. Ranganathan

The Five Laws of Library Science
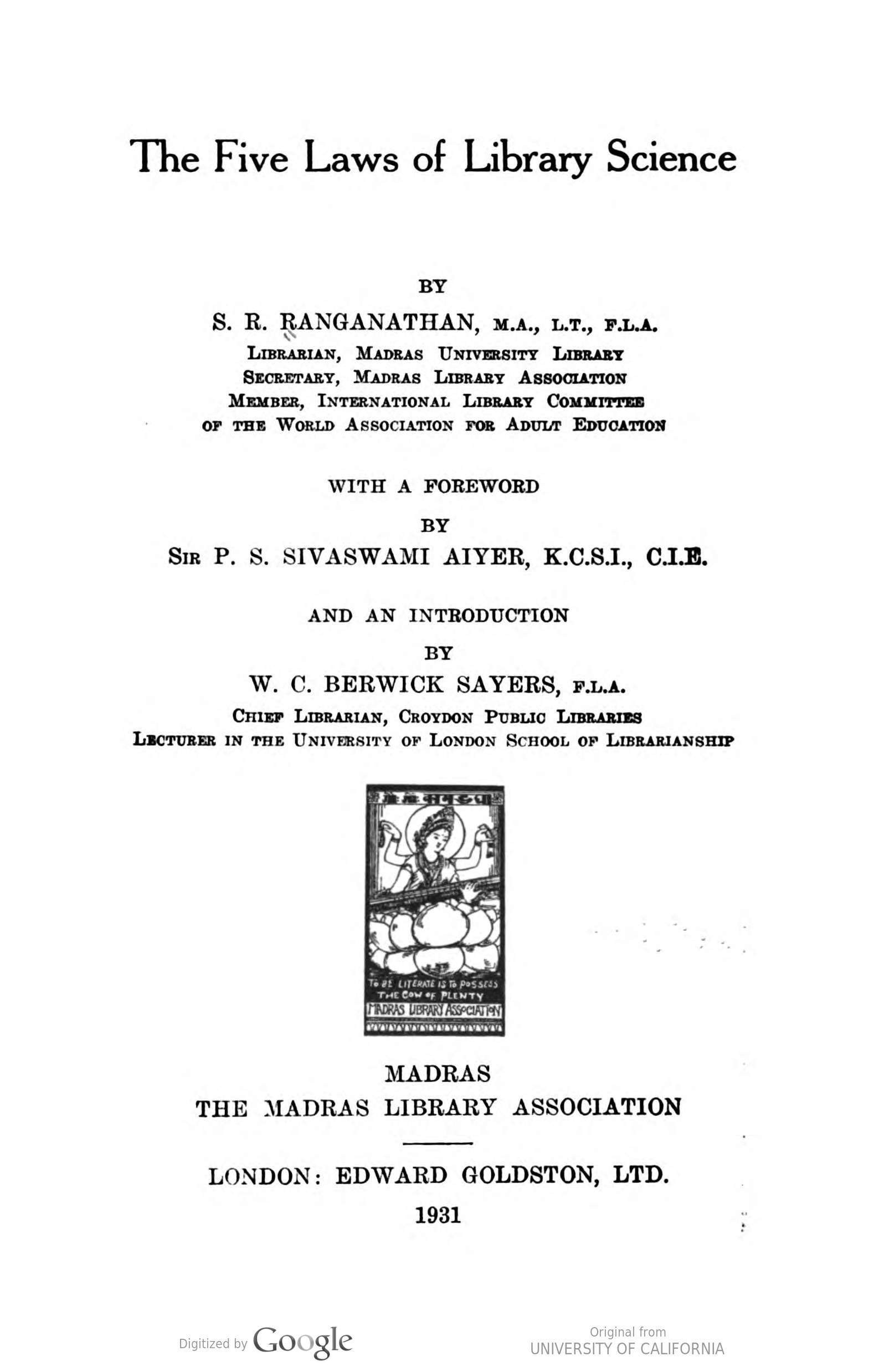
- Five laws of library science
- Author: S. R. Ranganathan
- Language: English
- Series: Madras Library Association Publication Series
- Release number: 2
- Subject: Library science
- Genre: Theory
- Publisher: Madras Library Association
- Publication date: 1931
- Publication place: India
- English publication date: 1931
- Media type: Print
- Pages: 520 pages

The five laws of library science is a theory that S. R. Ranganathan proposed in 1931, detailing the principles of operating a library system. Many librarians from around the world accept the laws as the foundations of their philosophy. These laws, as presented in Ranganathan's The Five Laws of Library Science, are:

1. Books are for use.
2. Every person has his or her book.
3. Every book has its reader.
4. Save the time of the reader.
5. A library is a growing organism.

== Overview ==
=== First Law ===
The first law of library science, "Books are for use," constitutes the basis for library services. This law means that books in libraries are not meant to be shut away from users. Ranganathan observed that books were often chained to prevent their removal and that the emphasis was on storage and preservation rather than use. He did not reject the notion that preservation and storage were important, but he asserted that the purpose of such activities should be to promote use. Without user access to materials, there is little value in these items. By emphasizing use, Dr. Ranganathan refocused the attention of the field to access-related issues, such as the library's location, loan policies, hours and days of operation, the quality of staffing, and mundane matters, such as library furniture and temperature control.

=== Second Law ===
The second law of library science, "Every person has his or her book," means that librarians should serve a wide collection of patrons, acquire literature to fit a wide variety of needs, and refrain from prejudice or judging what specific patrons choose to read. Librarians should respect that everyone is different and that everyone has different tastes regarding the books they choose. After the publication of The Five Laws of Library Science, Ranganathan named children, the physically disabled, artisans, newly literate adults, the intellectually disabled, working-class individuals, and individuals with niche interests as specific groups of potential readers that are served through the application of the second law. In addition, a library collection must represent the community it serves.

=== Third Law ===
The third law of library science, "Every book has its reader," means all books have a place in the library, even if only a small demographic might choose to read them. Ranganathan later clarified that the term "book" could be generalized to mean any document.

=== Fourth Law ===
The fourth law of library science, "Save the time of the reader," means that all patrons should be able to easily locate the materials they desire quickly and efficiently. The practice of librarianship creates systems, services, workflows, guides and frameworks to the benefit of practicality to the user. Ranganathan said the fourth law in turn saves the time of the library staff through such practices as centralized classification and cataloging, documenting materials before sending them to the library that ordered them, and mechanizing methods for information retrieval.

=== Fifth Law ===
The fifth law of library science, "A library is a growing organism," means that a library, like an organism, should be a dynamic institution that is never static in its outlook. Ranganathan identified two types of growth: growth that increases the quantity of items in the library's collection, and growth that improves the collection's overall quality through the replacement of materials. Books, methods, and the physical library should be updated over time. There needs to be a consideration of growing physical space, but in the 21st century this has come to mean the multiple formats and platforms a collection can encompass.

== Variants ==
=== The Law of Parsimony ===
Ranganathan also wrote about what he called "The Law of Parsimony." According to this law, financial resources should generally not be allocated to books that have a limited audience.

=== By other individuals ===
In 1998, Michael Gorman, a past president of the American Library Association, recommended the following laws in addition to Ranganathan's five:

1. Libraries serve humanity.
2. Respect all forms by which knowledge is communicated.
3. Use technology intelligently to enhance service.
4. Protect free access to knowledge.
5. Honor the past and create the future.

Gorman repeated these laws in Chapter 1 of his book Future Libraries: Dreams, Madness, & Realities, which was co-written by Walt Crawford, and in Our Singular Strengths: Meditations for Librarians.

In 2004, librarian Alireza Noruzi recommended the application of Ranganathan's laws to the Web:

1. Web resources are for use.
2. Every user has his or her web resource.
3. Every web resource has its user.
4. Save the time of the user.
5. The Web is a growing organism.

In 2008, librarian Carol Simpson recommended the following edits to Ranganathan's laws to reflect the richness of media:

1. Media are for use.
2. Every patron has his information.
3. Every medium has its user.
4. Save the time of the patron.
5. The library is a growing organism.

In 2016, Dr. Achala Munigal recommended the following edits to Ranganathan's laws due to the introduction and application of social tools in libraries:

1. Social Media is for use – increasingly in libraries by librarians.
2. Every user his or her Social Tool.
3. Every Social Tool its user.
4. Save time of user by providing information he or she seeks using the social tool he or she is familiar with.
5. Social Media is a growing organism, with various tools and apps being introduced every day. Libraries are not brick and stone anymore. They serve members and non-members alike in terms of non-traditional library service, irrespective of space and time.

In 2019, Basheerhamad Shadrach proposed the Five Laws of Knowledge, adapted from those of Ranganathan:

1. Knowledge is for use in all forms.
2. "Every citizen" has the right to access all forms of knowledge.
3. Every knowledge [sic] is for access by all without discrimination of any kind.
4. Save the time of all knowledge seekers.
5. A knowledge system is one that evolves with time to achieve all of the above laws.
