= Sarah Ann Long =

American librarian and columnist

President of the American Library Association
- In office 1999–2000
- Preceded by: Ann K. Symons
- Succeeded by: Nancy C. Kranich

Personal details
- Occupation: Librarian; columnist

Sarah Ann Long is an American librarian and columnist for The Daily Herald. She frequently advocates for libraries and literacy.

== Career ==
Long served as director of the Multnomah County Library in Portland, OR; the Dauphin County Library System in Harrisburg, PA; and the Fairfield County District Library in Lancaster, OH. At the time of her election as president of the American Library Association she served as director of the North Suburban Library System—a consortium of 680 public, academic, and special libraries headquartered in Wheeling, Illinois. During her tenure, she frequently advocated for libraries, especially library funding.

Long served as a president of the American Library Association with a term that started in July 1999. During her term, her theme was "Libraries build community." As part of her presidential year the American Library Association published A Place at the Table: Participating in Community Building in 2000 to establish the impact libraries should make in community engagement.

== Honors and awards ==
- Libraries and library systems under her direction have received the John Cotton Dana Award for excellence in public relations, presented annually by the American Library Association
- Librarian of the Year, Illinois Library Association, 1999
- Illinois Library Luminary award from the Illinois Library Association, 2009

Non-profit organization positions
Preceded by Ann K. Symons	President of the American Library Association; 1999–2000	Succeeded by Nancy C. Kranich
