= Maurice J. Freedman =

American librarian (1939–2026)

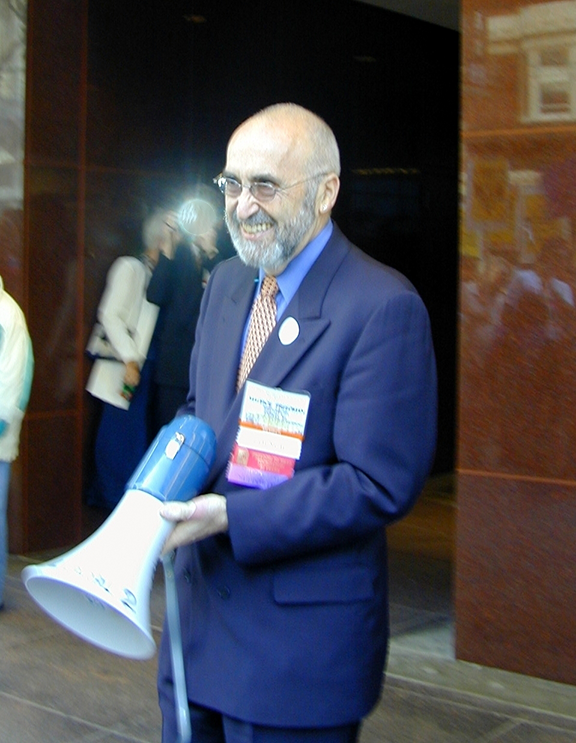

President of the American Library Association
- In office 2002–2003
- Preceded by: John W. Berry
- Succeeded by: Carla Hayden

Personal details
- Born: November 14, 1939 Newark, New Jersey, U.S.
- Died: March 5, 2026 (aged 86) Rhode Island, U.S.
- Education: Rutgers University; University of California, Berkeley School of Librarianship
- Occupation: Librarian

Maurice J. "Mitch" Freedman (November 14, 1939 – March 5, 2026) was an American librarian best known for his advocacy for socially responsible cataloging and library technologies, as well as for championing the cause of intellectual freedom. He served as president of the American Library Association from 2002 to 2003.

== Early life and career ==
Freedman was born on November 14, 1939, in Newark, New Jersey, to Max Freedman and Sylvia Casif, both Lithuanian immigrants. He graduated from Weequahic High School.

Freedman received his bachelor's degree from Rutgers University in 1961. He had a number of clerk and assistant jobs in libraries before receiving his Master of Library Science in 1965 from the University of California, Berkeley School of Librarianship. Freedman earned his Ph.D. in Library and Information Studies from Rutgers University in 1983.

The early part of Freedman's career was primarily as a technical services manager, where he worked on the application of information technology to bibliographical control. He worked at the Library of Congress from 1965 to 1968 and Information Dynamics Corp from 1968 to 1969.

From 1969 to 1974, he worked as director of the Technical Services Division at Hennepin County Library; there he instituted a policy of establishing non-pejorative cataloging and hired cataloger Sandy Berman to implement that policy. While at Hennepin County Library, Freedman also hired Michael McConnell after McConnell was fired from the University of Minnesota for being gay. Freedman worked from 1974 to 1977 as coordinator of technical services for the branch libraries of the New York Public Library.

Freedman was an associate professor at Columbia University School of Library Service from 1977 to 1982 and a visiting professor at Pratt Institute; he also taught as an adjunct instructor at Rutgers University. While at Columbia University he co-edited The Nature and Future of the Catalog (Oryx Press, 1979).

From 1982 to 2005, Freedman served as the director of the Westchester Library System. His accomplishments during that time included overseeing the computerization of the catalog of library materials as well as fighting legislation against Internet filters to limit individual access to websites.

After retirement from the Westchester Library System in 2005, Freedman served as interim director of a number of small libraries in New York, including the Nyack Library and the Pound Ridge Library. From 2013 to 2015, he served as the director for the New City Free Library.

== Library leadership ==
Freedman was one of the early activists in the American Library Association's Social Responsibilities Round Table. He served as president of ALA's Information Science and Automation Division (later renamed the Library and Information Technology Association) from 1977 to 1978.

Before it ceased operations in 1999, Freedman was a speaker and consultant for the United States Information Agency, advising libraries around the world on collection development, resource sharing, cataloging, and other areas of library work.

Freedman testified as a plaintiff in the 1997 lawsuit American Libraries Association v. Pataki, challenging New York's Internet censorship law, and was an outspoken critic of the 2000 Children's Internet Protection Act requiring the use of Internet filters.

From June 2002 to June 2003, Freedman was the president of the American Library Association. During Freedman's presidency, he focused on improving library workers' salary and compensation, instituting the Campaign for America's Librarians and the Task Force on Better Salaries for Library Workers which created resources for helping library workers who wanted to address salary inequities. Based on the recommendations of that and other ALA committees a separate advocacy organization, the ALA/Allied Professional Association (ALA-APA), was founded in 2002.

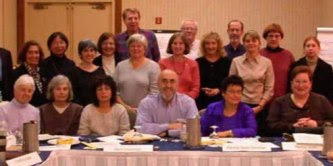
Better Salaries for Library Workers- 2002-American Library Association. Far Back Row from Screen Left: Norm Jacknis, Tom Wilding, Gene Kinnaly. Center Row from Screen Left: Harriet Selverstone, Sha Fagan, Jenna Freedman, Rosemary Mesh, Joan Goddard, Donna Mandel, Carol Brey, Cathy Bremer, Yvonne Farley, Jill Uncyk. Front Row from Screen Left: Mike Leber, Margaret Myers, Kathleen de la Peña McCook, 2002-2003 ALA President Maurice J. (Mitch) Freedman, Task Force Coordinator Patricia Glass Schuman, Patricia Smith

== Awards ==
In 1981, Freedman was honored with the Library and Information Technology Association Award for Achievement in Library and Information Technology.

When honored with the American Library Association Joseph W. Lippincott Award in 2014, recognizing his distinguished service to the profession of librarianship, Freedman was highly praised:

Mitch is an outspoken and visionary leader and a tireless advocate for better salaries and pay equity for all library workers, and for the humanistic application of technology in libraries. His contributions have had profound and lasting impact on who we are, what we do, our values, and what our work is worth. He has literally changed the way librarians talk about our libraries and our profession.

— Patricia G. Schuman, chair of the 2014 Lippincott Award jury

== U*N*A*B*A*S*H*E*D Librarian ==
Beginning in 2000, Freedman was the publisher and editor-in-chief of The U*N*A*B*A*S*H*E*D Librarian, described as the "How I Run My Library Good" letter. He continued the newsletter after the 1999 death of founder Marvin H. Scilken. In 2021, he suspended publication as noted in his final editorial, "This Is the Very Last Issue of The U*N*A*B*A*S*H*E*D™ Librarian."

== Death ==
Freedman died on March 5, 2026 in Rhode Island, at the age of 86.

== Selected publications ==
- Freedman, Maurice J. (2003). "Continuity and Change for U.S. Libraries in the Digital Age: How U.S. Public and Academic Libraries Are Confronting the Challenge of the Digital Library". Information Services and Use. 23 (4): 211–226. doi:10.3233/ISU-2003-23402.
- Freedman, Maurice J. (2002). "President's Message: The Campaign for America's Librarians". American Libraries. 33 (7): 7.
- Freedman, Maurice J. (1996). "Connection Development: Web Lessons from Westchester". Library Journal. 121 (16): 42–44.
- Freedman, Maurice J. (1984). "Automation and the Future of Technical Services". Library Journal. 109 (11): 1197–1203.
- Freedman, Maurice J. (1981). "Circulation Systems Past and Present". Journal of Library Automation. 14 (4): 278–285.
- Freedman, Maurice J.; Malinconico, S. Michael; American Library Association Information Science and Automation Division (1979). The Nature and Future of the Catalog : Proceedings of the ALA’s Information Science and Automation Division’s 1975 and 1977 Institutes on the Catalog. Phoenix, AZ: Oryx Press.

Non-profit organization positions
Preceded by John W. Berry	President of the American Library Association; 2002–2003	Succeeded by Carla Hayden
