= Andrew K. Pace =

American librarian and author

Andrew K. Pace is an American librarian and author. He has served as executive director of the Association of Research Libraries since February 2024. Previously he served as executive director of the University System of Maryland and Affiliated Institutions (USMAI) Library Consortium since March 2022, after fifteen years working in various leadership positions at OCLC.

== Career ==
From 2008 to 2009 Pace served as president of the Library and Information Technology Association (LITA). He was the author of the "Technically Speaking" column for American Libraries magazine. In 2013 he was elected councilor-at-large for the American Library Association (ALA). In 2016 he was elected to serve a three-year term on the ALA executive board and ran for ALA Treasurer in 2019, losing the election to Maggie Farrell, dean of university libraries at University of Nevada, Las Vegas.

Between 1999 and 2007 Pace was Head of Information Technology for North Carolina State University Libraries. In 2002 Pace was named "Librarian of the Year" at the 15th annual DRA User's Conference. In 2004 Pace was appointed to the leadership team responsible for the coordination and planning of National Information Standards Organization MetaSearch Initiative. Prior working at NCSU he worked at a product manager for Innovative Interfaces, a library software vendor. Between 2007 and 2022, Pace held various leadership positions at OCLC, including executive director for Technical Research and executive director for Management Services.

He holds a BA in rhetoric and communications studies from the University of Virginia and an MSLS from the Catholic University of America.

== Publications ==
Pace's major work includes the 2003 book, The Ultimate Digital Library: Where the New Information Players Meet. He maintains the blog Hectic Pace.

- "Optimizing Library Web Services: A Usability Approach," Library Technology Reports, v. 38, no. 2 (Chicago: ALA TechSource), 2002
- The Ultimate Digital Library: Where the New Information Players Meet (American Library Association, 2003) ISBN 0-8389-0844-6
- "Toward a Twenty-First Century Catalog," Information Technology and Libraries, 2006 (With Antelman and Lynema)
- "21st Century Library Systems," Journal of Library Administration, 2009
- "Meeting the E-Resources Challenge through Collaboration," The Serials Librarian, 2015
- "Closing the Gap," Serials Review, 2015
