= Ann K. Symons =

American librarian

President of the American Library Association
- In office 1998–1999
- Preceded by: Barbara J. Ford
- Succeeded by: Sarah Ann Long

Personal details
- Education: University of California; University of Oregon
- Occupation: Librarian

Ann K. Symons is an American librarian. She served as a president of the American Library Association from 1998 to 1999 and prior to that Treasurer from 1992 to 1996.

== Education ==
Symons earned a Bachelor of Arts degree from the University of California and a Masters in Library Sciences degree from the University of Oregon.

== Career ==
She has been a school librarian since 1970 working in Alaska and Anglo American School of Moscow.

During her ALA Presidency, her presidential initiative was the adoption of a new ALA intellectual freedom statement Libraries: An American Value.

== Awards ==
She was the 1999 recipient of the Robert B. Downs Intellectual Freedom Award from the American Library Association, the 2002 recipient of the Joseph W. Lippincott Award from the American Library Association, and the 2014 recipient of American Library Association Equality Award

In 2017 Symons was awarded American Library Association Honorary Membership, the highest honor awarded.

== Selected publications ==
- Protecting the Right to Read (Neal Schuman, 1995)
- Speaking Out! Voices in Celebration of Intellectual Freedom (ALA Editions, 1999)

Non-profit organization positions
| Preceded by Barbara J. Ford | President of the American Library Association; 1998–1999 | Succeeded by Sarah Ann Long |
