= Leslie Burger =

American librarian

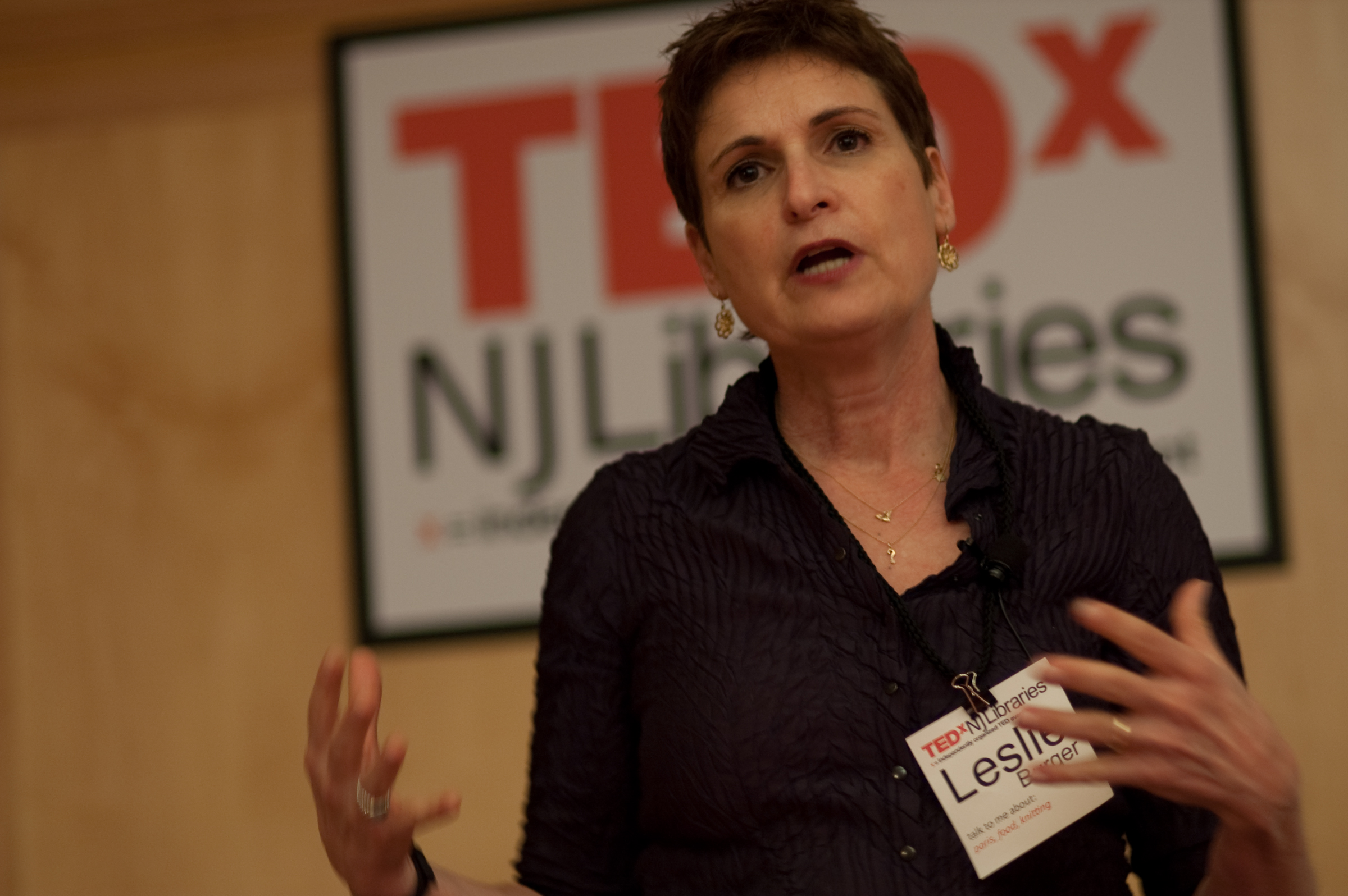

President of the American Library Association
- In office 2006–2007
- Preceded by: Michael Gorman
- Succeeded by: Loriene Roy

Personal details
- Education: Southern Connecticut State College, University of Maryland, College Park, University of Hartford
- Occupation: Librarian

Leslie B. Burger is the interim Executive Director of the American Library Association. She is an American librarian who served for sixteen years as the executive director of the Princeton Public Library. She was president of the American Library Association from 2006 to 2007.

== Education and career ==
After growing up in Bridgeport, Connecticut, Burger obtained a Bachelor's degree from Southern Connecticut State College in 1973, a Master of Library Science from the University of Maryland, College Park in 1974, and a master's in organizational behavior from the University of Hartford in 1988. Burger held a number of positions in planning and library development, including at the Bridgeport Public Library, the Connecticut State Library and the New Jersey State Library.

From 1999 to 2015, Burger was the executive director of the Princeton Public Library, where she led the library in the design, construction, and opening of a new building as well as development efforts resulting in more than $25 million in private funding.

Along with her husband Alan, Burger is the founder and owner of Library Development Solutions, a consulting firm where she provides guidance to libraries on strategic planning, space-assessments, building programs, and program evaluation and implementation. She also works as a part time lecturer at the Rutgers University School of Communication and Information, where she designed and teaches a course on transformative library leadership.

== American Library Association ==
In 2023 Burger was appointed interim Executive Director of the American Library Association.

Burger served as president of the American Library Association from 2006 to 2007, concentrating her efforts on initiatives focused on how libraries need to transform to serve their communities.

As president Burger represented ALA in challenging the Federal Bureau of Investigation over the access to patron records enabled by the USA PATRIOT Act. She also testified before the Senate Committee on Environment and Public Works on the issue of closing Environmental Protection Agency libraries.

During her presidency she launched the organization's "Emerging Leaders" program, dedicated to providing leadership opportunities to new library professionals.

== Library leadership and recognition ==
Burger was president of the Connecticut Library Association in 1982 and president of the New Jersey Library Association from 2001 to 2002.

She was named the University of Maryland College of Information Studies Alumnus of the Year in 2005.

The New Jersey Library Association named Burger their 2017 Librarian of the Year.

Non-profit organization positions
| Preceded by Michael Gorman | President of the American Library Association; 2006–2007 | Succeeded by Loriene Roy |
