= Barbara J. Ford =

American librarian

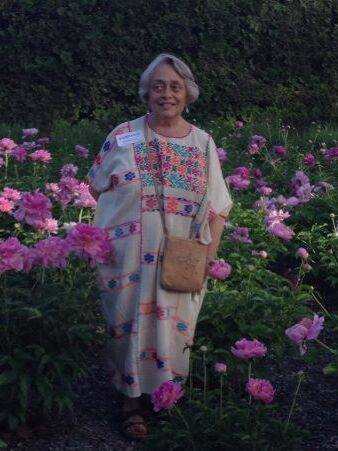
- Ford in 2014

President of the American Library Association
- In office 1997–1998
- Preceded by: Mary R. Somerville
- Succeeded by: Ann K. Symons

Personal details
- Education: Illinois Wesleyan University; Tufts University; University of Illinois at Urbana-Champaign
- Occupation: Librarian

Barbara J. Ford is an American librarian who served as president of the American Library Association from 1997 to 1998. In 2026 she was awarded American Library Association Honorary Membership, the Association's highest honor.

== Education and career ==
Ford earned a bachelor's degree from Illinois Wesleyan University, a master's degree in International Relations from Tufts University and a master's degree in library science from the School of Information Sciences (University of Illinois Urbana-Champaign).

Ford served as a Peace Corps volunteer in Panama and Nicaragua.

Her professional positions include director of the Harold Washington Library, as assistant commissioner for central library services at the Chicago Public Library; executive director of the Virginia Commonwealth University libraries; and associate library director at Trinity University in San Antonio, Texas. She has also served in several positions at the University of Illinois at Chicago.

Ford was Director of Mortenson Center for International Library Programs at the University of Illinois at Urbana-Champaign libraries from 2003 to 2014.

Ford served as an elected member of the Governing Board of the International Federation of Library Associations and Institutions from 2005 to 2009. She served as a member of the U.S. National Commission for UNESCO from 2011 to 2013.

== Community engagement ==
Ford has been an advocate of community engagement throughout her career. She was the inaugural Jean E. Coleman Library Outreach Lecturer for the American Library Association in 2000 and emphasized the need for libraries to broaden their strategies to collaborate with new partners.

Living this advocacy, Ford has been an active member of community groups in all the places she has worked. Her community engagement has included service on the Boards of the Friends of the San Antonio Public Library, Friends of the Richmond Public Library, and Friends of the Champaign Public Library.

While director of the Chicago Public Library, Harold Washington Library, Ford served on the Greater State Street Council, and the Printer's Row Book Fair.

In Champaign, Illinois, Ford served on the Advisory Board of the Spurlock Museum of World Cultures and the Champaign Historic Preservation Commission.

== American Library Association ==
Ford's ALA Presidential theme was "Libraries: Global Reach – Local Touch" during 1997–1998. She edited a volume, Libraries: Global Reach Local Touch, that included her inaugural speech.

Ford was president of the Association of College and Research Libraries from 1990 to 1991. She was chapter councilor from Illinois 1980-1984 and councilor-at-large 1985-1989.

== International librarianship ==
Ford served as an elected member of the Governing Board of the International Federation of Library Associations and Institutions (IFLA) from 2005 to 2009. She served as secretary for IFLA's Section on Government Information and Official Publications, and on IFLA's Academic and Research Libraries Section.

She wrote "Librarians: Our Reach Is Global and Our Touch Is Local" in 2005.

Ford is active in the International Relations Round Table of the American Library Association and serves on the Endowment and Fundraising Committee.

As Director of the Mortenson Center for International Library Programs at the University of Illinois at Urbana-Champaign from 2003–2015 Ford spoke to embassies, library associations in many countries and international library association conferences. She is also founder of the UNESCO Center for Global Citizenship.

Ford served as a member of the U.S. National Commission for UNESCO from 2011 to 2013.

In 2026, Ford was the keynote speaker for the "Learning from a Library Luminary" series, sponsored by the Association of African Universities and the Mortenson Center for International Library Programs.

== Awards and honors ==
- 2026. American Library Association Honorary Membership
- 2016. Illinois Library Association Illinois Library Luminary for her dedication to the field.
- 2012. CALA Distinguished Service Award from the Chinese American Librarians Association.
- 2010. Sheth Distinguished Faculty Award for International Achievement, from the University of Illinois at Urbana-Champaign recognizing her work in teaching, research, and public service in the international arena.
- 2008. John Ames Humphry/OCLC/Forest Press Award for significant contribution to international librarianship.
- 2008. ALA Legacy Society Honor Roll for contributions to the library community.
- 2000. Inaugural lecturer Jean E. Coleman Library Outreach Lecture.
- 1998. Illinois Wesleyan University. Distinguished Alumni Award.
- 1997. University of Illinois Urbana-Champaign Distinguished Alumnus Award from the School of Information Sciences.

== Selected publications ==
- Chu, Clara M.; Ford, Barbara J. (2025). "Global Perspective on Public Libraries". In Bossaller, Jenny S.; Adkins, Denice (eds.). Introduction to Public Librarianship (4th ed.). Chicago: ALA Neal-Schuman. pp. 279–310. ISBN 9798892555630.
- Ford, Barbara J. (2011). "Global Perspectives on Public Libraries". In McCook, Kathleen de la Peña (ed.). Introduction to Public Librarianship (2nd ed.). New York: Neal-Schuman. pp. 312–337. ISBN 9781555706975.
- Ford, Barbara J. (2008). "LIS Professionals in a Global Society". In Haycock, Ken; Sheldon, Brooke E. (eds.). The Portable MLIS: Insights from the Experts. Westport, Connecticut: Libraries Unlimited. pp. 195–203. ISBN 9781591585473.
- Ford, Barbara J.; Schnuer, Susan (2008). "A Global Leadership Context for Librarians". Thinking Outside the Borders: Library Leadership in a World Community. Urbana-Champaign, Illinois: Mortenson Center for International Library Programs at the University of Illinois. pp. 8–16. OCLC 298435615.
- Ford, Barbara J.; Schnuer, Susan; Johnson, Debra Wilcox (2007). "Developing an International Library Leadership Institute: Thinking Outside the Borders". In Ritchie, Ann; Walker, Clare (eds.). Continuing Professional Development: Pathways to Leadership in the Library and Information World (1st ed.). München, Germany: K. G. Saur. pp. 40–56. ISBN 9783598220340.
- Ford, Barbara J. (2005). "Librarians: Our Reach Is Global and Our Touch Is Local". In Horrocks, Norman (ed.). Perspectives, Insights & Priorities: 17 Leaders Speak Freely of Librarianship. Lanham, Maryland: Scarecrow Press. pp. 49–54. ISBN 9780810853553.
- Ford, Barbara J. (2004). "Global Perspectives on Public Libraries". In McCook, Kathleen de la Peña (ed.). Introduction to Public Librarianship. New York: Neal-Schuman. pp. 265–291. ISBN 9781555704759.
- Ford, Barbara J. (1998). "ALA President's Message: International Partnerships: Books and Librarians". American Libraries. 29 (2): 30.
- McCook, Kathleen de la Peña; Ford, Barbara J.; Lippincott, Kate (1998). Libraries: Global Reach, Local Touch. Chicago: American Library Association.
- Ford, Barbara J. (1995). "Conference Circuit: IFLA '95: Where Europe Meets Asia". College & Research Libraries News. 56 (9): 644–45. doi:10.5860/crln.56.9.644.
- Ford, Barbara J.; Jacobs, Sally J. (1995). "Academic Libraries". Librarianship and Information Work Worldwide. London: Bowker-Saur. pp. 55–89.
- Ford, Barbara J. (1994). "Information Literacy Goes International". College & Research Libraries News. 55 (7): 423–25. doi:10.5860/crln.55.7.423.
- Ford, Barbara J.; Nakata, Yuri (1983). "Reference Use of State Government Information in Academic Libraries". Government Publications Review. 10 (2): 189–99. doi:10.1016/0277-9390(83)90004-3.

Non-profit organization positions
Preceded by Mary R. Somerville	President of the American Library Association; 1997–1998	Succeeded by Ann K. Symons
