= Jean E. Coleman Library Outreach Lecture =

The Jean E. Coleman Library Outreach Lecture presented at the annual conference of the American Library Association (ALA) is tribute to the work of Jean E. Coleman to ensure that all citizens, particularly Native Americans and adult learners, have access to quality library services. Dr. Coleman directed the ALA, Office for Literacy and Outreach Services (OLOS) which served the Association by identifying and promoting library services that support equitable access to the knowledge and information stored in our libraries. OLOS focused attention on services that are inclusive of traditionally underserved populations, including new and non-readers, people geographically isolated, people with disabilities, rural and urban poor people, and people generally discriminated against based on race, ethnicity, sexual orientation, gender identification, age, language and social class. The Jean E. Coleman lecture is now sponsored by the Office for Diversity, Literacy and Outreach Services (ODLOS).

The inaugural lecturer was Barbara J. Ford in 2000. Librarian of Congress, Carla Hayden was lecturer twice--in 2006 and 2015.

== Jean E. Coleman ==
The Jean E. Coleman Library Outreach Lecture series is an opportunity for library workers to learn more about their roles in providing equity of access. The Social Responsibilities Round Table Action Council of the American Library Association approved the following testimonial to the work of African American librarian Jean Coleman in outreach during her work from 1973 to 1986 for the ALA Office for Library Outreach Services (now Office for Literacy and Outreach Services: OLOS):

Jean Coleman ... was outstanding in her willingness to listen to the members of the groups she worked with and to make their wishes effective, translating ideas into action and program, unlike the model of the staff who organizes the agenda and steers the meetings in a controlled setting.
She offered her services especially warmly to the minority librarians and those from small libraries, and did not play a career-promoting role of special services for the powerful. She therefore fully represented the original concerns of ALA in proposing the many outreach organizations and diverse programs under the OLOS umbrella.
She is especially missed by those who found in her the education to become competent officers and received from her the support to make their groups effective.

So important were her contributions to the world of diversity in librarianship, that in 1999 it was noted that the Smithsonian Institution accepted two items for its collection from Coleman's estate, including two Apache toy cradle boards, and a sand painting.

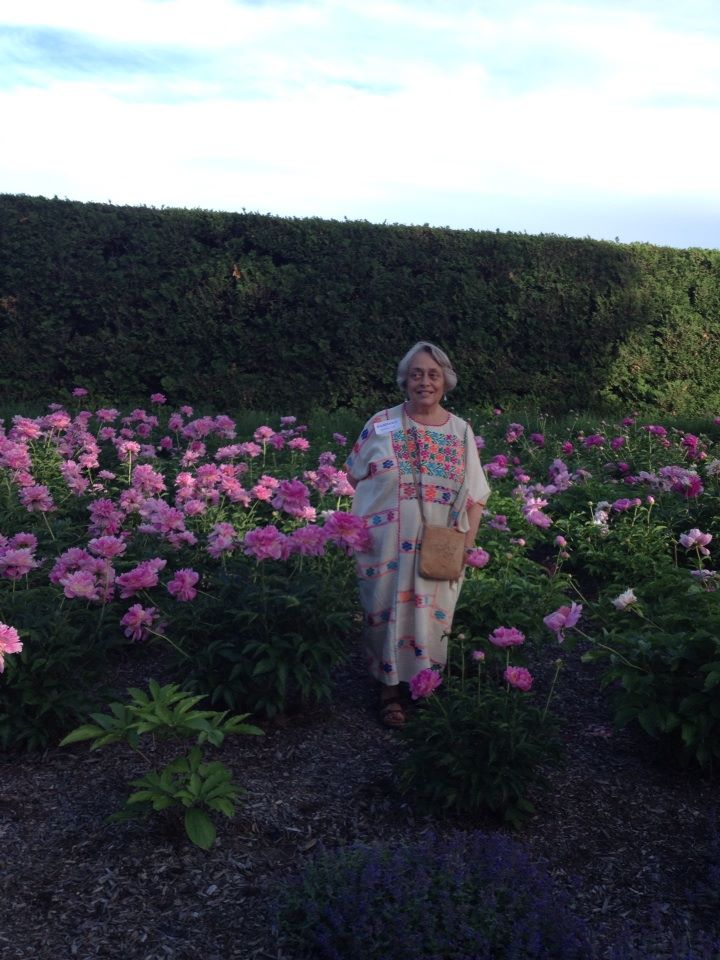
Barbara J. Ford was the inaugural Jean E. Coleman Lecturer.

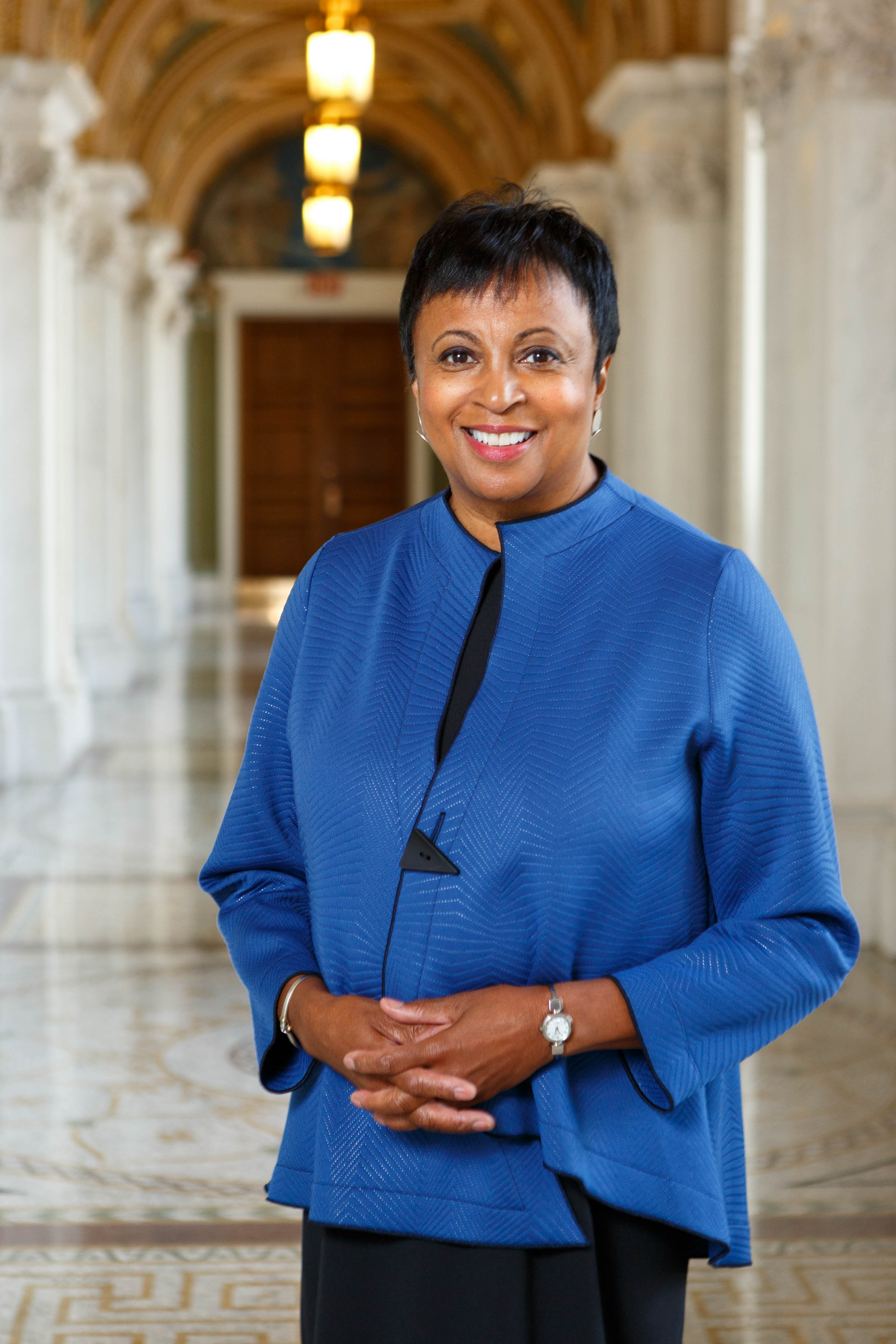
14th Librarian of Congress, Dr. Carla Hayden, was Coleman Lecturer in 2006 and 2015

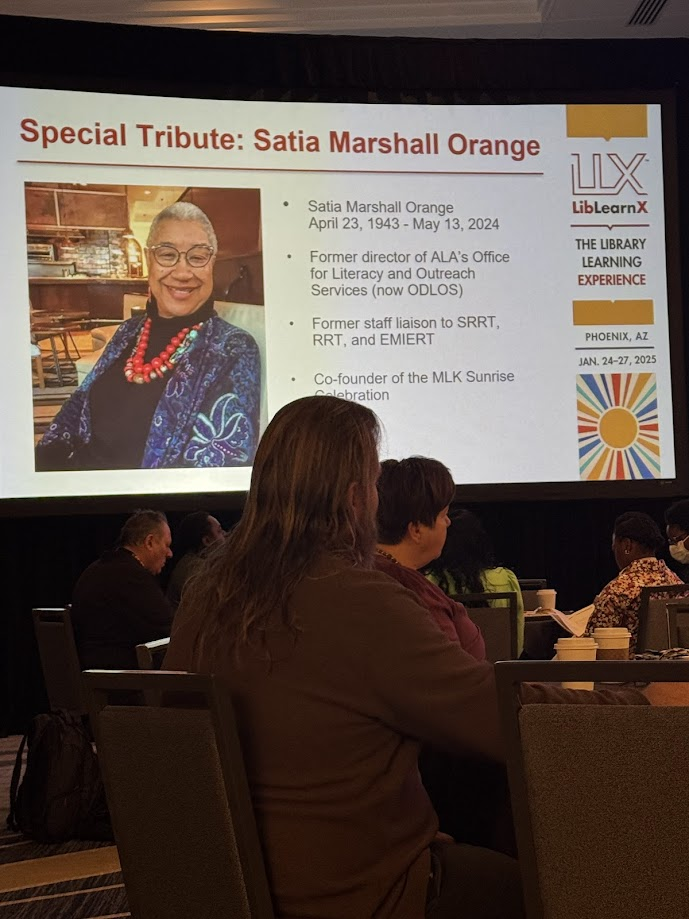
Satia Marshall Orange, 2019 lecturer, honored at 26th Annual Dr. Martin Luther King, Jr. Holiday Observance & Sunrise Celebration-American Library Association, January 26, 2025.

The inaugural lecturer was Barbara J. Ford in 2000.

== Legacy ==
For background on the development of outreach services in U.S. libraries The evolution of library outreach 1960–75 provides historical background in the context of the War on Poverty.

Jean Coleman's legacy is the evolving mission of the Office of Literacy and Outreach Services. This also includes the ideals of equity of access. Carla Hayden chose equity of access as her theme when she was American Library Association president (2003–04). A book written during Hayden's presidency, From outreach to equity: Innovative models of library policy and practice includes an introduction coauthored by Satia Marshall Orange (director, OLOS, 1997–2009). The book suggests reframing outreach based on equity rather than underserved populations.

A report highlighting the work of OLOS was initiated by President Hayden, Rocks in the Whirlpool: Equity of Access and the American Library Association which examined unifying visions for equity of access and making new technologies work for human development.

Satia Marshall Orange, 2019 lecturer, gave a history of the series in her presentation, "Backstories: Reflections of the Jean E. Coleman Library Outreach Lecture: 2000–2019".

== Lecture Series ==
Date	Jean E. Coleman Library Outreach Lecturer	Lecture Title
2025	Nicole A. Cooke, Augusta Baker Endowed Chair at the University of South Carolina, School of Information Science.	"We Will Not Be Erased: A Manifesto for Liberation."
2024	No lecture	
2023	Ady Huertas, San Diego Public Library, Program Manager of Youth, Family, and Equity Services.	"Creando Enlaces y Abriendo Puertas: Creating connections and establishing trust to provide welcoming inclusive services for historically excluded communities."
2022	Jeanie Austin, Jail and reentry services librarian at the San Francisco Public Library. Author, Library Services and Incarceration.	"Creativity, Learning and Free Expression in Carceral Contexts." Panelists: Nicole Shawan Junior, Deputy Director of PEN America Prison and Justice Writing and Kurtis Tanaka, program manager for justice initiatives at Ithaka S+R.
2021	Aaron LaFromboise, Director, Library Services, Medicine Spring Library, Blackfeet Community College and community library/archives for the Blackfeet Nation.	"Mirroring Community in the Library: Growing momentum for Tribal libraries and Tribal librarianship."
2020	no Lecture	
2019	Satia Marshall Orange, director of American Library Association Office for Literacy and Outreach (OLOS) now the Office for Diversity, Literacy and Outreach Services (ODLOS).In 2022 ALA established an endowment honoring Orange.	"Backstories: Reflections of the Jean E. Coleman Library Outreach Lecture: 2000–2019"
2018	no lecture	
2017	Janice Rice, retired Outreach Coordinator at the University of Wisconsin-Madison Libraries.	“Visions of the Web: Indigenous Values, Voices and Literacy.”
2016	Andrew P. Jackson (Sekou Molefi Baako), director emeritus of Queens Library Langston Hughes Community and Cultural Center.	Lecture on his extensive library outreach to schools, libraries, organizations, cultural institutions, correctional facilities, churches and academic arenas.
2015	Carla D. Hayden CEO, Enoch Pratt Free Library in Baltimore. Hayden was named Librarian of Congress in 2016.	For her efforts to keep the Library and its branches open and continually engaged with the community during the civil unrest in the wake of the death of Freddie Gray in April 2015.
2014	Virginia Bradley Moore. Librarian at the Oxon Hill Branch Library in the Sojourner Truth Room, African American Research Collection of the Prince George's County Memorial Library System.	Creation of the Martin Luther King Jr. Sunrise Celebration at ALA Conferences.
2013	Loriene Roy, Professor, University of Texas at Austin School of Information, President of the American Library Association	Supporting literacy, promoting LIS education through an emphasis on practice, and establishing programs for workplace wellness.
2012	Carol A. Brey-Casiano, Director of libraries for El Paso, Texas, and president of the ALA.	Library advocacy and outreach notably to Spanish-Speaking patrons.
2011	Robert Wedgeworth, University Librarian and Professor Emeritus, University of Illinois; Former President and CEO, ProLiteracy Worldwide; Former Executive Director, American Library Association.	"Literacy in Libraries: Challenges and Opportunities.
2010	Kathleen de la Peña McCook, Distinguished University Professor, University of South Florida, School of Information.	"Librarians and Human Rights."
2009	Kathleen Mayo, consultant to State Library and Archives of Florida, improving library programs for Florida's correctional, mental health, and developmental disabilities services.	"The Challenges and Opportunities of Serving America’s Elders."
2008	Clara Chu, proponent of multicultural librarianship. Director, Mortenson Center for International Library Programs	"Dislocations of Multicultural Librarianship: A Critical Examination for a Liberatory Practice." "
2007	Anne Moore, Associate Director at University of Massachusetts-Amherst, later Dean of Library Affairs at Southern Illinois University and Stephen E. Stratton, Librarian at J.S. Broome Library,	"Lies in the libraries: changing the image of gay and lesbian from abnormal to acceptance."
2006	Carla D. Hayden, CEO, Enoch Pratt Free Library in Baltimore, named Library Journal National Librarian of the Year in 1995.Hayden appointed Librarian of Congress in 2016.	"Access Agenda for All Libraries."
2005	Sanford Berman, sought to correct biased headings in the Library of Congress Subject Headings, worked to ensure libraries work more with the poor and homeless, founded the ALA's Hunger, Homeless and Poverty Task Force.	"Classism in the Stacks: Libraries and Poverty."
2004	Richard Chabrán, chair, California Community Technology Policy Group (CCTPG), works to narrow the digital divide to schools and libraries in California. Sought to promote multicultural librarianship and assists libraries in serving low-income and underserved communities.	"Answering the Call: How the FCC’s Definition of Information Service Threatens the Future of Universal Service."
2003	Thelma H. Tate, Professor, Global Outreach Services Coordinator, New Brunswick Libraries, Rutgers University Libraries	"Unserved and Underserved Populations: Empowering People for Productivity in the 21st Century."
2002	Lotsee Patterson, founder, American Indian Library Association, Professor University of Oklahoma, Library and Information Studies.	"Indigenous Librarianship: A Global Perspective."
2001	Gary E. Strong, Director, Queens Borough Public Library, State Librarian for California, University Librarian for UCLA.	"Reading: Still Cool? Libraries, Literacy and Leadership."
2000	Barbara J. Ford, Director Harold Washington Library in capacity as Assistant Commissioner, Chicago Public Library; later Director, Mortenson Center for International Library Programs, President, American Library Association.	"Libraries, Literacy, Outreach and the Digital Divide."

== See also ==
- Children's Literature Lecture Award known as the May Hill Arbuthnot Lecture from 1970-2020.
- A.S.W. Rosenbach Lectures in Bibliography
- Alice G. Smith Lecture
- Richard and Mary Rouse History of the Book Lectures
