= Loriene Roy =

American librarian from Texas

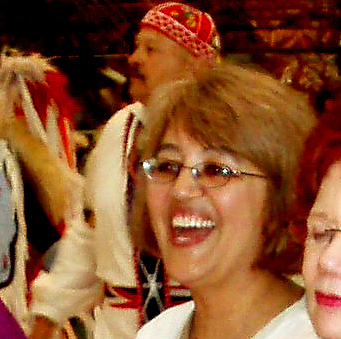
- Loriene Roy at her inauguration as President of the American Library Association in Washington D.C. in 2007

President of the American Library Association
- In office 2007–2008
- Preceded by: Leslie Burger
- Succeeded by: James R. Rettig

Personal details
- Education: University of Arizona; University of Illinois at Urbana-Champaign
- Occupation: University professor, Librarian

Loriene Roy is an American scholar of Indigenous librarianship, professor and librarian from Texas. She was the first Native American president of the American Library Association when she was inaugurated in 2007.

== Biography ==
=== Background and education ===
Loriene Roy was born and raised in rural towns bordering the Fond du Lac Reservation in northern Minnesota. She is Anishinabe, a member of the Minnesota Chippewa Tribe, and is enrolled on the White Earth Reservation. Roy received a Master's degree in Library Science from the University of Arizona and received her Doctorate degree from the University of Illinois at Urbana-Champaign.

=== Career ===
Roy joined the faculty at the University of Texas at Austin in 1987, where she teaches in the School of Information and the Center for Women's and Gender Studies.

Roy focuses her work on developing and promoting library services and cultural heritage initiatives with and for Indigenous populations, public libraries, and measurement and evaluation of library services. She founded and directs a national reading club for Native children called "If I Can Read, I Can Do Anything", and a scholarship program for Indigenous students called "Honoring Generations" that is funded by the Institute of Museum and Library Services.

Roy says that "there are barriers to library use. One is creating the family tradition of supporting libraries and reading. Another is that libraries need to adapt flexible policies-including open hours, circulation length of loan. Tribal libraries can be exciting plans that support cultural expression and should be the place where Native language learning takes place, where records are housed and organized, where children and family members gather."

=== American Library Association ===
Roy began as President-Elect of the American Library Association (ALA) on June 28, 2006, and was inaugurated as the 2007–2008 President of ALA at the 2007 ALA Annual Conference, becoming the first Native American President of the ALA.

Roy outlined three main platform issues when she became President: supporting literacy, promoting LIS education through practice, and creating programs for workplace wellness. To help fulfill these goals, she formed working circles in place of traditional task forces, bringing a greater element of inclusivity and community to the work of the presidency. From the presidency Roy says she learned "to face your fears or deficiencies...that many people have ideas for you but only a few are willing to step up and really help. Keep those people happy!"

Previously, Roy was elected ALA Councilor-At-Large for two terms, 1997–2000 and 2004–2006, and served on a number of ALA Council Committees including the Committee on Education, Committee on Committees, Committee on the Status of Women in Librarianship, and Nominating Committee. Roy was also the 1997-1998 President of the American Indian Library Association, and she is a member of the Corazon de Tejas chapter of REFORMA and Associate Member of Te Ropu Whakahau, Maori in Libraries and Information Management.

In 2013 Roy was honored as the Jean E. Coleman Library Outreach Lecture speaker. Her lecture, "What's Love Got to Do With It?: The Place of Love and Forgiveness in Library and Information Studies" was based on her work with the Fetzer Institute.

=== Indigenous Librarianship ===
Roy is an advocate for Indigenous librarianship.

The United Nations celebrated the International Decade of the World's Indigenous Peoples, 1995–2005. The first international forum of information professionals of Indigenous heritage was held in Auckland, New Zealand/Aotearoa, 1–4 November 1999: "affirming the knowledge and values of Indigenous peoples in the age of information" (Toi te kupu, toi te mana, toi te whenua). Roy documented this forum, "The International Indigenous Librarians' Forum: A Professional Life-Affirming Event" She identified the impact of IT on Indigenous people at the beginning of the digital era.

Roy was Convener on Indigenous Matters for the International Federation of Library Associations in 2008–2009. She edited the issue, "Indigenous Library Services", for the journal, World Libraries. Roy has characterized her work with Indigenous information services as an "evolving ecology –a system of balances and negotiation." Roy has developed case studies on public library service to Indigenous people.

Roy is an advocate of the advancement of library and information services to Indigenous people and her lecture,"As Long as the Rivers Flow: Continuing Efforts to Support and Advance Services with and for Indigenous Peoples," was presented at the International Indigenous Librarians' Forum in Auckland, Aotearoa/New Zealand in 2019.

The International Federation of Library Associations volume Indigenous Notions of Ownership and Libraries, Archives and Museums. for which Roy was editor, included her essay, "Who is Indigenous?".

=== Awards ===
Roy has received many professional awards, including the 2006 American Library Association Equality Award; 2007 Library Journal "Mover & Shaker"; Outstanding 2002 Alumna from the University of Arizona's School of Information Resources and Library Services; the Joe and Bettie Branson Ward Excellence Award for Research, Teaching, or Demonstration Activities that Contribute to Changes of Positive Value to Society; two Texas Exes Teaching Awards; and two James W. Vick Texas Excellence Awards for Academic Advisors.

In 2015 the American Indian Library Association honored Roy with the Distinguished Service Award.

Roy was selected as a member of the Inaugural Cohort of The University of Texas at Austin, Provost's Distinguished Service Academy, 2020–2025.

Non-profit organization positions
Preceded by Leslie Burger	President of the American Library Association; 2007–2008	Succeeded by James R. Rettig
