= Library and Information Technology Association =

Division of the American Library Association

The Library and Information Technology Association (LITA) was a division of the American Library Association (ALA), focusing on the intersections of libraries and information technology. Founded in 1966 and headquartered in Chicago, LITA was dissolved in 2020 amid declining membership and persistent budget deficits. LITA merged into a new ALA division, Core.

== Name ==
During the division's initial stages of development in 1966, it was pressed by the ALA's Reference and User Services Association that the name should include the words "Information Science", and as a result of this and a report made by a Committee of Organization, the Information Science and Automation Division (ISAD) of the ALA came into existence. The name was later changed by the bylaws committee to the Library and Information Technology Association (or LITA, as it is more commonly known) in 1978 due to the expansion of the division's scope in the twelve years that it had been operational.

== History ==
In the early 1960s, the idea of libraries utilizing computers came into existence at the National Library of Medicine with the MEDLARS project, which was a pioneer project that came about in 1961 for serials control. From this point, library technology began to trend within the library community, and the ALA started to participate in the technology world, bringing about innovation in library technology by 1964.

On January 27, 1966, the ALA Committee on Organization proposed that a new division of the ALA be created to grow with and endorse these new developments in library technology. A formal recommendation of the division's creation was constructed by the Committee on Organization and was then taken to the ALA Council, who approved the division's establishment, birthing the Information Science and Automation Division, which would later be renamed the Library and Information Technology Association. The division was officially established in New York at the 1966 ALA Annual Conference. The first elections for the Board of Directors occurred on July 1, 1967, where Stephen R. Salmon was elected as the first president of the division. During the first two to three decades of the division's life, it experienced a complex organizational shift as it was rapidly evolving and expanding, resulting in its change of name to the Library and Information Technology Association (LITA). The expansion of LITA during this time also brought about the growth of interest groups and the inclusion of new programs like "The Distinguished Lecture Series" and "LITA Scholarships". Following the initial strain of the division's developing years, LITA began to see financial light by the 1990s, and by 1993, the roster had grown to 5,802 members and was considered a reputable, well organized, and efficiently run division of the ALA.

In 2017 LITA celebrated fifty years and the 50th Anniversary Task Force provided a slide show. Four areas of focus for the future included Member Engagement, Organizational Sustainability, Education and Professional Development and Advocacy and Information Policy.

== Board of directors ==
LITA was managed by an elected Board of Directors. Positions on the board included president, vice-president, immediate past-president, ALA councilor, and seven other directors. In addition to the board, there was an executive committee, which was controlled by the Board of Directors and acted on its behalf between regular board meetings.

=== Past Presidents ===
The following is a list of past LITA presidents:

- Weinraub Lajoie, Evviva 2020
- Morton-Owens, Emily 2019–2020
- Kim, Bohyun 2018–2019
- Yelton, Andromeda 2017–2018
- Fifarek, Aimee 2016–2017
- Dowling, Thomas P. 2015–2016
- Vacek, Rachel 2014–2015
- Blyberg, Cindi Trainor 2013–2014
- Stewart-Marshall, Zoe 2012–2013
- Cuddy, Colleen 2011–2012
- Starr, Karen 2010–2011
- Frisque, Michelle 2009–2010
- Pace, Andrew 2008–2009
- Beatty, Mark 2007–2008
- Postlethwaite, Bonnie 2006–2007
- Mullin, Patrick J. 2005–2006
- Riggs, Colby M. 2004–2005
- Wilson, Thomas C. 2003–2004
- Ensor, Pat 2002–2003
- Wilson, Flo 2001–2002
- Randall, Sara L. 2000–2001
- Gorman, Michael 1999–2000
- Higginbotham, Barbara B. 1998–1999
- Miller, Linda D. 1997–1998
- Leonhardt, Thomas W. 1996–1997
- Newberry, Michele (Dalehite) 1995–1996
- Roderer, Nancy K. 1994–1995
- Miller, Tamara J. 1993–1994
- Crawford, Walt 1992–1993
- Peters, Paul Evan 1991–1992
- Michalak, Jo-Ann 1990–1991
- Parkhurst, Carol A. 1989–1990
- Schmidt, Sherrie 1988–1989
- Potter, William Gray 1987–1988
- DeBuse, Raymond 1986–1987
- Kershner, Lois M. 1985–1986
- Eaton, Nancy L. 1984–1985
- Dowlin, Kenneth 1983–1984
- Gray, Carolyn M. 1982–1983
- Kenney, Brigitte L. 1981–1982
- Malinconico, S. Michael 1980–1981
- Markuson, Barbara E. 1979–1980
- Martin, Susan K. 1978–1979
- Freedman, Maurice J. 1977–1978
- Rosenthal, Joseph A. 1976–1977
- Avram, Henriette B. 1975–1976
- Kilgour, Frederick G. 1974–1975
- Kilgour, Frederick G. 1973–1974
- Shoffner, Ralph M. 1972–1973
- Shera, Jesse H. 1971–1972
- DeGennaro, Richard 1970–1971
- Hayes, Robert M. 1969–1970
- Shank, Russell 1968–1969
- Becker, Joseph 1967–1968
- Salmon, Stephen R. 1966–1967

=== Bylaws ===
The bylaws of LITA were adopted in 1966 by the Board of Directors and had sixteen revisions since their implementation, the latest in 2013. They included bylaw information for LITA's name, object, membership, officers, terms of office, duties, board of directors, meetings, committees and representatives, interest groups, nominations and elections, amendments of bylaws, publications, notice by mail, and parliamentary authority.

In March 2014, LITA's Board of Directors began a new analysis of its bylaws, and planned to do a comprehensive review of each of the bylaws, starting with those deemed to need the most immediate attention and gradually assessing each from that point onward.

== Conferences ==
Since LITA's birth, participating in both ALA and independent annual conferences played a major part in promoting LITA's mission, which was to provide forums for individuals in the library community to converge and collaborate on subjects related to technological change in libraries. Typically with sponsored participation, LITA was involved in several conferences since the 1960s such as COLA, the LITA Forum, the annual ALA Midwinter Meeting, and the ALA Annual Conference, and participated in conferences like the "Airlie Conference" in 1970 as well as a conference titled "Directions in Education for Information Science: A Symposium for Educators" in 1971.

=== COLA ===
In April 1964, representatives from libraries gathered in Illinois for the ALA's Clinic on Library Applications of Data Processing (COLA), a conference where like-minded individuals had the opportunity to connect on this emerging field of library technology and express their enthusiasm for its possibilities for libraries globally during these formative years.

=== LITA Forum ===
First held in 1998, the LITA National Forum became a highly regarded annual event for those whose work involves new and leading technologies in the library and information technology field. The conference valued opportunities for attendees to expand their knowledge base in the technological field by seeing presentations and participating in workshops.

=== ALA Conferences ===
LITA also participated in the ALA Midwinter Meeting by offering workshops that contained more specified information about library technology as well as a LITA Open House, a chance for attendees of the conference to learn about LITA's yearly operations and developments and their strategic plans for the future.

In addition to the ALA Midwinter Meeting, LITA was also involved with the ALA Annual Conference by providing pre-conference workshops, a LITA Open House, and presentations involving library technology.

== Committees ==
The LITA Committees were created by the Board of Directors in order to manage specific concerns within LITA's broad encompassment of issues. The committees were made up of a minimum of three appointed LITA members, with the opportunity for interns to be appointed for one-year terms. There was also one board member who serves as a liaison to a committee so as to guarantee open communication between a respective committee and the Board of Directors.

List of LITA committees active as of 2014:

- Assessment and Research Committee
- Bylaws and Organizations Committee
- Committee Chairs Committee
- Education Committee
- Financial Advisory Committee
- Forum Planning Committee 2014
- Forum Planning Committee 2015
- Frederick G. Kilgour Award Committee
- Hugh C. Atkinson Memorial Award Committee
- Interest Group Chair Committee
- LITA/ALCTS Metadata Standards Committee
- LITA/Christian Larew Memorial Scholarship Committee
- LITA/Ex Libris Student Writing Award Committee
- LITA/Hi Tech Award Committee
- LITA/OCLC and LITA/LSSI Minority Scholarships Committee
- Membership Development Committee
- Nominating Committee
- Program Planning Committee
- Publications Committee
- ITAL Editorial Board
- Top Technology Trends Committee
- Web Coordinating Committee

== Members ==
The members of LITA were "information technology professionals dedicated to educating, serving, and reach out to the entire library and information community." LITA sought to provide its members with "a forum for discussion, an environment for learning, and a program for actions on the design, development, and implementation of automated and technological systems in the library and information science field".

=== Interest Groups ===
LITA had nineteen interest groups, open to all members. Interest groups were a way for members to become involved in LITA's regular operations and learn about emerging trends or issues in library technology. They helped to shape future LITA programs, education initiative and publications.

Interest Groups active as of 2014:

- Accessibility
- Authority Control (LITA/ALCTS)
- BIGWIG—Blog, Interactive Groupware, and Wiki Interest Group
- Distance Learning
- Drupal4Lib
- Electronic Resources Management (LITA/ALCTS)
- Game Making
- Heads of Library Technology
- Imagineering
- Library Code Year (LITA/ALCTS)
- Library Consortia Automated Systems
- Linked Library Data (LITA/ALCTS)
- LITA Instructional Technologies
- MARC Formats Transition (LITA/ALCTS)
- Mobile Computing
- Next Generation Catalog
- Open Source Systems
- Public Library Technology
- Search Engine Optimization
- User Experience

== Publications ==
Publications by LITA included the LITA Guides book series and published conference proceedings. A complete list can be found on the American Library Association web site and in WorldCat by searching for Library and Information Technology Association as an author.

Information Technology and Libraries (ITAL) was the refereed journal published quarterly by LITA. ITAL content included feature articles, communications, tutorials and reviews related to all aspects of libraries and information technology.

LITA also maintained the LITA Blog, which contained announcements about LITA programming as well as original contributions by LITA members about technologies and trends.
