= Carol A. Brey-Casiano =

American librarian

President of the American Library Association
- In office 2004–2005
- Preceded by: Carla Hayden
- Succeeded by: Michael Gorman

Personal details
- Occupation: Librarian, information resource officer

Carol A. Brey-Casiano is an American information resource officer and librarian who was president of the American Library Association from 2004 to 2005.

== Education ==
Brey-Casiano earned a master's degree in library science from University of Illinois. Brey-Casiano earned a PhD from University of Texas at Austin's Graduate School of Library & Information Science.

== Career ==
From 1991 to 1995, she was the Director of the Oak Park Public Library.

Brey-Casiano served as executive director of the El Paso Public Library. In 2001, Brey-Casiano stood up against the Texas Ranger, mayor of El Paso, Texas, a lawyer named Francisco Domínguez, and the El Paso police for the purpose of protecting intellectual freedom and privacy of library users.

From 2004 to 2005, Brey-Casiano served as the president of the American Library Association.

Brey-Casiano also served as an information resource officer for the United States Department of States. In September 2017, as the Regional Public Engagement Specialist, Brey-Casiano was an opening ceremony speaker at the Argentine Binational Center Executive Directors Meeting in Argentina.

Brey served 2018–21 as director of the Office of American Spaces (OAS) in Washington, D.C., overseeing more than 600 of public diplomacy platforms in over 145 countries

In 2022 she was appointed director of the Quality of Life Department by the city of Las Cruces, New Mexico.

== Publications ==
- Brey-Casiano, Carol A. (2010). "Carol Brey-Casiano Tells a Patriot Act Story." American Libraries (Chicago, Ill.). Vol. 41. American Library Association, 2010.
- Brey-Casiano, Carol A. “From Literate to Information Literate Communities Through Advocacy.” Public Library Quarterly (New York, N.Y.) 25, no. 1–2 (2007): 181–90.
- Gascón García, Jesús. Carol A. Brey-Casiano: “Sí, podem fer-ho!” Item (Barcelona, Spain). Col.legi Oficial de Bibliotecaris-Documentalistes de Catalunya, 2005.

== Awards ==
- 2012 Jean E. Coleman Library Outreach Lecture

== See also ==
- List of presidents of the American Library Association
- Intellectual freedom#LeRoy C. Merritt Humanitarian Fund

Non-profit organization positions
Preceded by Carla Hayden	President of the American Library Association; 2004–2005	Succeeded by Michael Gorman
