= Jorge Reina Schement =

American scholar and academic administrator

- Education: Stanford University; University of Illinois Urbana-Champaign; Southern Methodist University
- Occupations: Scholar and academic administrator
- Employer: Rutgers University
- Known for: Research in information policy, telecommunications, and Spanish-language media
- Title: Professor Emeritus
- Spouse: Nancy C. Kranich

Jorge Reina Schement is Distinguished Professor Emeritus of Journalism and Media Studies at Rutgers University. Previously he was dean of the School of Communication and Information at Rutgers, and Vice Chancellor of Institutional Diversity and Inclusion.

== Early life and education ==
Schement is from a Latino family and was raised in South Texas. He also has Native American and Jewish ancestry.

Schement earned his Ph.D. in Communications from the Institute for Communications Research at Stanford University in 1976, an M.S. in Marketing from the School of Commerce at the University of Illinois Urbana-Champaign in 1972, and a BBA in Management at the Southern Methodist University in 1970. During his time at Southern Methodist University, he was Vice President of Sigma Iota Epsilon.

== Career ==
Schement taught at the UCLA Graduate School of Library and Information Science from 1984 to 1987. In 1987, he was appointed to the faculty of Rutgers University.

From 1997 to 2008, Schement held appointments as a distinguished professor at Penn State University and a co-director of the Institute for Information Policy at that school. Previously he was a faculty fellow at the Columbia Institute for Tele-Information at Columbia University.

In 2008 he was appointed dean of the School of Communication and Information at Rutgers. In 2013 he was named by Rutgers University President Robert Barchi as the Vice Chancellor of Institutional Diversity and Inclusion. He is currently Distinguished Professor Emeritus of Journalism and Media Studies at Rutgers University.

Schement's research and scholarship address issues in the areas of information policy, global telecommunications, the social aspects of the Information Age, Spanish-language media, and information-consumer behavior. More specifically, he has focused on the social and policy consequences of the production and consumption of information, with a special interest in policy as it relates to ethnic minorities.

Schement serves as the editor-in-chief of the Macmillan Encyclopedia of Communication and Information, as well as an editorial board member of: IT & Society, Journal of Media and Religion, Information and Behavior, and Telematics and Informatics.

== Personal life ==
Schement is married to Nancy C. Kranich.

== Selected publications ==
- Schement, Jorge Reina; Lievrouw, Leah A. (1987). Competing Visions, Complex Realities: Social Aspects of the Information Society. Ablex Publishing Corporation.
- Firestone, Charles M.; Schement, Jorge Reina (1995). Toward an Information Bill of Rights and Responsibilities. Aspen Institute.
- Schement, Jorge Reina, ed. (2002). Encyclopedia of Communication and Information. Macmillan Reference USA.
- Schement, Jorge Reina; Curtis, Terry (2018). Tendencies and Tensions of the Information Age: Production and Distribution of Information in the United States. Routledge. doi:10.4324/9781351306041.
