= Nancy C. Kranich =

American librarian

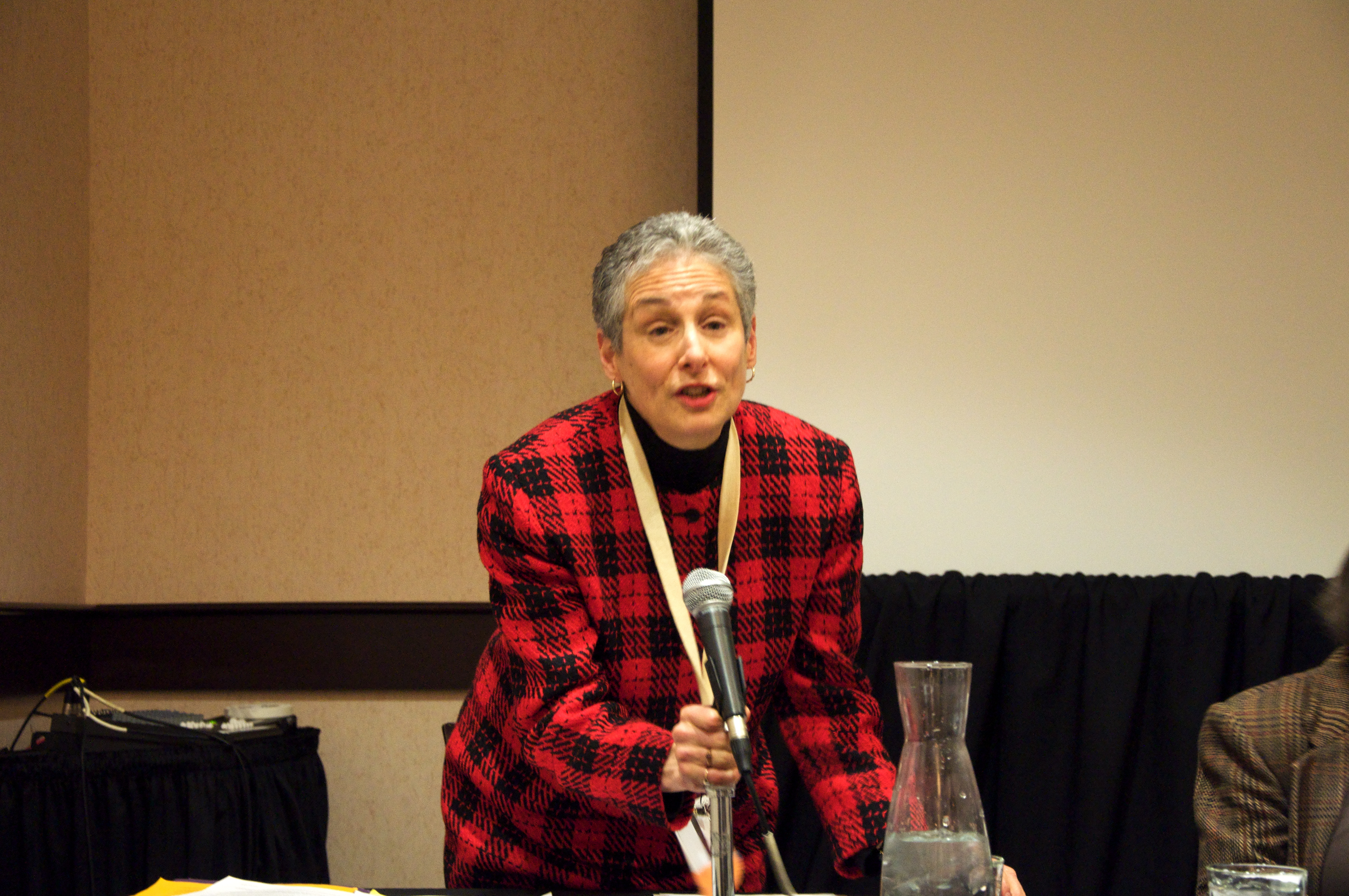

President of the American Library Association
- In office 2000–2001
- Preceded by: Sarah Ann Long
- Succeeded by: John W. Berry

Personal details
- Born: Nancy Carol Kranich
- Spouse: Jorge Reina Schement
- Occupation: Librarian

Nancy Carol Kranich is an American librarian. She served as president of the American Library Association from 2000 to 2001. During her term as the American Library Association's president, she focused on libraries' role in building democracies.

== Early life and education ==
Kranich attended the University of Wisconsin where she received a B.A. in anthropology and an M.A. in library science. She later earned an M.P.A. in public administration from New York University.

== Career ==
Kranich worked at the New York University Libraries from 1978 to 2002. She held several positions including associate dean, director of public services and director of administrative services

She is on the faculty of Rutgers University-New Brunswick where she teaches courses on Community Engagement; Information Policy; and Intellectual Freedom.

In 2001 she spoke at the Elizabeth W. Stone Lecture series on the topic, "Why Do We Still Need Libraries?"

Kranich has been engaged in public policy work including health literacy; intellectual freedom; the civic role of libraries with the Kettering Foundation; and as Founder of the American Library Association Center for Civic Life.

== Personal life ==
Kranich is married to Jorge Reina Schement.

== Selected publications ==
- Kranich, Nancy C. (2021) "Democracy, Community, and Libraries" in Mary Ann Davis Fournier and Sarah Ostman, eds Ask, Listen, Empower: Grounding Your Library Work in Community Engagement, pp. 1–15. Chicago: ALA editions.
- Kranich, Nancy C., and Joneta Belfrage. Libraries & Democracy: The Cornerstones of Liberty. Chicago: American Library Association, 2001. ISBN 083890808X
- Kranich, Nancy C. (2010) "Academic Libraries As Hubs For Deliberative Democracy," Journal of Public Deliberation: Vol. 6 : Iss. 1, Article 4. Available at: http://www.publicdeliberation.net/jpd/vol6/iss1/art4

Non-profit organization positions
Preceded by Sarah Ann Long	President of the American Library Association; 2000–2001	Succeeded by John W. Berry
