= Glossary of library and information science =

This glossary page is created to give readers a place to find key terms and concepts used in the Library and Information Science (LIS) field. There are a large range of topics including cataloging and organization, metadata, digital libraries, archival studies, and other areas covered. The purpose is to have one place with reliable sources for professionals in the field and students who are planning to go into it.

This page is a glossary of library and information science.

== A ==
Abstract
Is a brief set of statements that summarize, classifies, evaluates, or describes the important points of a text, particularly a journal article. An abstract is typically found on the first page of a scholarly article. Because an abstract summarizes an article, it is very useful for either browsing or keyword searching.
Annotation
An explanatory or critical note or commentary. Annotation is also the process of adding an explanatory or critical note or commentary to a text. Reference lists are often annotated with comments about what each resource covered and how useful it was.
Appendix
A group of supplementary material appended to a text. It is usually related to the material in the main part of the text but not so closely related to it that it should be put into the main text. Put background information and supporting facts in the appendices. An example of a file that should be put in an appendix is a file of detailed charts and graphs of recent research closely related to the paper's main topic.
Archive
A place in which selected materials such as documents, objects, and other records are preserved due to their value both culturally, historically, or evidentiary to the individual, organisation, or society curating the collection.
Arrangement
The organization of entities in a certain order.
Article
1. (General) A document of writing, physical or virtual, on any given subject matter.
2. (Scholarly) A document of writing specifically planned, researched, and curated by researchers to share insights within original research. This process is often quality assured through peer review where a group of academic peers review the article for its quality, merit, and original contribution. These are often published within academic journals that facilitate their quality assurance, publication, and access.
Author
An originator of a creative work, particularly a writer of a text. Searching by author can be an effective form of information gathering.
Authority control
cataloging process in library management of assigning unique headings to subjects such as author names and book titles to enable greater efficiency in referencing.

== B ==
Bibliography
A list of writings related to a specific subject, writings by a specific author, or writings used in producing a specific text.
Bibliographic database
Is a computer based list of library resources. Typically each record contains the call number, author, title, publishing information, and other card catalog information.
Bibliographic Framework (BIBFRAME)
Data model for linked metadata of bibliographic description. Initiated by the Library of Congress to replace the MARC standards.
Boolean logic
The algebraic system, developed by George Boole that is applied to Boolean expressions that contain Boolean operators such as AND, OR, NOT AND, and XOR (exclusive OR). This binary algebraic system is used primarily in switching circuits and database searches. Boolean operators are not to be confused with proximity operators such as NEAR.
Browse
To inspect something casually, particularly to use a web browser to casually inspect web pages over the Internet. This involves following links from page to page (also called surfing) rather than searching directly. The main difference between browsing and searching is that with browsing you have very little advance knowledge of what will be on the next page.

== C ==
Call number
An identification marker used in libraries to categorize and locate books and other resources. Each resource is assigned a combination of letters and numbers which correspond with a location in the library. For example, the call number for the Publication Manual of the American Psychological Association is BF76.7 .P83 2001.
Catalog/ catalogue
A complete and systematically organized enumeration of items, particularly the complete enumeration of a libraries' resources on a set of paper cards (card catalog) or in an electronic database (bibliographic database).
Categorization
Grouping together like concepts, entities, objects, resources, etc.
Citation
The quoting or mentioning of a source. All works used in preparing a paper should be cited.
Citation search
A search, by name, of all references to an individual. Some databases have a specific citation search option, otherwise you use a full-text search. For an example of a database that has a specific citation search option go to the University of Michigan Library Database.
Classification
The arrangement of subjects into certain categories.
Community analysis
The analysis of a set of people. Such analyses enable librarians to know the needs of patrons and hopefully provide better services to them. In a city library district, the set of relevant people would be all those who live in the city or those people eligible to use the library. Analysis may also be restricted to a subset of eligible library users.
Conceptual model
A representation of a system. It consists of concepts used to help people know, understand, or simulate a subject that the model represents. In contrast, physical models are physical object such as a toy model that may be assembled and made to work like the object it represents.
Controlled vocabulary
Limiting searches to the exact subject headings contained in the Library of Congress. An example would be "History – Bibliography etc". Some indexes, like Wilson Indexes, have their own system of headings and hence their own controlled vocabulary.
Copyright
The legal right granted to a copyright holder for the exclusive sale, distribution or reproduction of a creative work. It is a form of intellectual property that prevents others from using a creative work without consent of the owner. For example, Thomas Mann holds the copyright on the book The Oxford Guide to Library Research.
Cross reference database
A collection of records that have one or more fields that reference other related records. These connections (for example between "marketing" and "promotion") make browsing very productive and allow related-items searches.

== D ==
Database
Is an organized collection of data, generally stored and accessed electronically from a computer system.
Descriptor
An index term used to identify a record in a database. It can consist of a word, phrase, or alphanumerical term. It can describe the content of the record or be an arbitrary code. When a descriptor is descriptive, it can be an effective search parameter.
Dewey Decimal Classification (DDC)
A hierarchical system for classifying books and other library materials by subject, first published in 1876 by the librarian and educator Melvil Dewey, who divided human knowledge into 10 main classes, each of which is divided into 10 divisions, etc. In Dewey Decimal call numbers, Arabic numerals and decimal fractions are used in the class notation (example: 996.9) and an alphanumeric book number is added to subarrange works of the same classification by author and by title and edition (996.9 B3262h).
Digital preservation
A formal process to ensure that digital information of continuing value remains accessible and usable in the long term.
Dissertation
A written treatise or thesis, usually lengthy, usually authored by a doctoral candidate, usually directed by a faculty advisor, and usually intended to advance the state of the art in a given discipline. There can be an oral component to the process, in which the dissertation must be defended in front of critical judges. Dissertation searches are valuable because of their currency.
Document delivery
The transfer of a database record, or other information resource, to the end user. It can involve direct internet or email transfers, CD delivery via mail, paper delivery via mail, or delivery via interlibrary loan.

== E ==
Edition
A version of a published text, or all the instances of a published text issued at a given time. An example would be the 2nd edition (2001).
Entry
Any record, or a field in a record, that has been included, or entered, into a database. An entry word is the headword in a dictionary, encyclopedia, or glossary.
Enumeration
Is a complete, ordered listing of all the items in a collection.

== F ==
Field
An element of a database record. It contains one type of information and has a unique address. All or most other records in the database have a similar field. An example is the field "name".
Finding aid
A description of an archival collection that describes the collection as a whole rather than individual pieces within the collection.
Free-text search

1. is a simple word or character search, usually with very few Boolean, proximity, or scope limiting options. It is simple and fast.

2. a search in which all the entries are freed from their original format of presentation. Text that originated in a journal article looks much the same as text that originated in a glossary or chat room.

3. the deliberate limiting of the scope of the search parameters to include only records that are available free of charge.

Full text database
A collection of records containing complete versions of the original source, rather than just bibliographies, abstracts, or abridgements. An example is JSTOR. A related concept is that of a full text search which searches only sources that are complete, and ignores those records that are mere abstracts or descriptors.

== I ==
Information extraction
Is the task of automatically extracting structured information from unstructured and/or semi-structured machine-readable documents.
Information literacy
Is the set of integrated abilities encompassing the reflective discovery of information, the understanding of how information is produced and valued, and the use of information in creating new knowledge and participating ethically in communities of learning.
Information mapping
Is a research-based method for writing clear and user focused information, based on the audience's needs and the purpose of the information.
Information science
Is a field primarily concerned with the analysis, collection, classification, manipulation, storage, retrieval, movement, dissemination, and protection of information.
Interlibrary loan
Or interloan – a service whereby a user of one library can borrow books or receive photocopies of documents that are owned by another library. The user makes a request with their local library, which, acting as an intermediary, identifies owners of the desired item, places the request, receives the item, makes it available to the user, and arranges for its return. This resource sharing system is being promoted by the International Federation of Library Associations and Institutions (IFLA).
Inventory
A tool used to provide a record of what is owned.

== J ==
Journal
A periodical publication that presents articles in a specific subject area. These may be academic journals, trade journals, or organizational newsletters.

== K ==
Keyword search
A search of a database using some keyword, a significant word from the title, abstract, or descriptor of a record as a point of reference to the article's overall content.

== L ==
Literature search
A systematic and thorough search of all material, print or electronic, published on a given topic. This can include books, journals, newspapers, catalogs, encyclopedias, dictionaries, atlases, bibliographies, handbooks, manuals, indexes, yearbooks, gazetteers, directories, chronologies, almanacs, and guides.
Location device
A number or other designation system that is used to physically locate an item.

== M ==
MARC (Machine-Readable Cataloging)
A set standard of prescribed codes that allows a record to be "read" by a machine by identifying specific elements of a catalog record. MARC is used to share bibliographic data between libraries by transmitting the encoded metadata from one system to another, then displayed to the user in an identifiable form.
Menu
A list of options from which a computer user can choose. This saves the user from having to memorize a set of commands. It also reduces the decision down to the basic information required (note the etymology from the French word minuet meaning small).
Monograph
A written document on a single subject, usually scholarly in nature and of approximately book length. They are valuable information sources because of their depth in a limited subject area.

== O ==
OCLC (Online Computer Library Center)
A comprehensive bibliographic network that provides bibliographic, abstract, and full-text information to users.
Operators
Symbols that represent operations. In computer science there are binary and unary operators depending on the number of elements or records an operator acts on. In database searching there are Boolean and Proximity operators. Boolean operators are a subclass of logical operators (Logical operators are binary operators that manipulate data at the bit level.). A Boolean operator manipulates the binary "true/false" value.
Online catalog
Or electronic catalog – a record of the holdings of an institution (e.g. library or museum) or group of institutions (a consortium), often searchable, that can be found on the Internet.
Open access
A mechanism by which research outputs are distributed online, free of cost or other barriers,[1] and, in its most precise meaning, with the addition of an open license applied to promote reuse.
Open source
In production and development a philosophy or methodology promoting free redistribution and access to an end product's design and implementation details.

== P ==
Pathfinder
A subject bibliography used to find resources the library has available on a specific topic.
Paywall
A method of restricting access to content via a paid subscription.
Periodical index
An alphabetized listing of works that are published at regular intervals of more than one day.
Plagiarism
Directly or indirectly passing off the work of others as your own. Characterised from poor use of citations and paraphrasing.
Plan S
The name for an initiative started in 2018 to established open access science publishing amongst twelve European countries.
Primary source
The originator of a primary record. A primary record is a resource created by the same people that initially experienced or used it. They create the records for their own purposes, records that often remain unpublished. Sometimes they witness an event, sometimes they are involved in an event, and sometimes the record is directly created by the event.

== R ==
Record
1. (Store information) A written document, both physical or virtual, that holds an account of a given subject of interest for future reference.
2. (Computer science) Is a collection of data items that can be read and processed by a computer programme, with multiple records contained within a file or dataset.
3. (Database) Is a collection of a fixed number of variables known as fields, with each field having its own identifier and data type across a given row. These fields can have numerous data types such that a record within a database might look like: Unique ID, first name, last name, age, country, etc.
Reference service

The personal assistance provided to the library users in finding information. All the functions performed by a trained librarian employed in the reference section of a library to meet the information needs of patrons (in person, by telephone, or electronically), including but not limited to answering substantive questions, instructing users in the selection and use of appropriate tools and techniques for finding information, conducting searches on behalf of the patron, directing users to the location of library resources, assisting in the evaluation of information, referring patrons to resources outside the library when appropriate, etc. are regarded as the services provided under library reference services.

== S ==
Search strategy
A generalized set of technique used in the process of determining what information you currently have, determining what information you need, and determining how to get it. Some possible strategies include; controlled vocabulary searches, specific entry searches, browsing, general scanning, broad to narrow searches, adjacent item browsing, subject tracings searches, keyword searches, citation searches, literature searches, cross reference searches, and chat room questions and other direct people contact searches.
Subject heading
The name of the category that a record is included under. For example, the record "natural frequency of vibration" might be found under the subject heading of "Acoustics", and acoustics, in turn, might be found under the subject heading "Physics".
Subject directory
An hierarchical grouping of related subject headings. The tree structure shows relationships between subject headings. They can be found either inside a database or separate from a data base.

== T ==
Thesaurus
A book of synonyms, often also containing antonyms. An example is Roget's Thesaurus. In database searching, a thesaurus strategy is to use multiple iterations to search for related words and generate result. The database will often suggest synonyms and related words to try.
Truncation
The shortening of a search word, field, or record. In the case of truncating a search word, this is a strategy used to search among multiple variants or spellings of a word. The asterisk (*) is generally used as a wildcard to replace a letter or letters. An example is invest* which will pick up instances of invest, investor, investments, investigations, etc. In some databases, the asterisk must be accompanied with a number that define the number of characters that can be truncated.

== W ==
Weeding
Is the systematic removal of resources from a library based on selected criteria around usage, value or quality, and physical condition, amongst other select criteria depending on the goals of the organisation.
