= Jean Ellen Coleman =

American librarian and literacy educator

- Born: Brooklyn, NY
- Died: November 9, 1996 (aged 67–68); Teaneck, NJ
- Occupation: librarian

Jean Ellen Coleman (1928 - November 9, 1996) was an American librarian known for being the founding director of the American Library Association's Office for Library Outreach Services where she worked from 1973 to 1986. This Office was originally created as the Office of Library Service to the Disadvantaged in 1970—opening officially in 1973—and later became the Office for Library Outreach Services in 1980 and the Office for Literacy and Outreach Services in 1995. It has been known as the Office for Diversity, Literacy and Outreach Services since 2012.

During her time at OLOS, Coleman met with US Department of the Interior personnel in conjunction with the American Indian Library Association to improve nationwide services to Native libraries and their patrons. She also worked with a group of eleven national volunteer, private, and public sector organizations dubbed The Coalition for Literacy to launch a nationwide literacy campaign. The group ran ad spots about literacy, created a toll-free 800 number to connect people to literacy programs, connecting 40,000 volunteers with literacy programs local to them.

Her assertion was that literacy education was a significant and relevant method for reaching out to those individuals and groups who do not make much use of library services, so literacy education was a worthwhile role for libraries to undertake. She organized and led Literacy Training Projects in three major cities where 124 participants from thirty-three states and the Virgin Islands attended and learned how to establish and maintain literacy tutoring programs.

Coleman resigned in 1987. In 2000 ALA created an annual lecture series, The Dr. Jean E. Coleman Library Outreach Lecture, in her honor.

== Early life and education ==
Coleman was born in Brooklyn, New York, the daughter of John Milton Coleman and Hughie Boyer Coleman. She graduated from Hunter College and earned her MLS from Pratt. She taught on the San Carlos Apache Indian Reservation between 1956 and 1957 and at the Jewish Guild for the Blind from 1958 through 1962. She worked for Brooklyn Public Library until she was hired by the American Library Association in 1973. She earned the PhD at Rutgers University.
