= Michael Gorman (librarian) =

Anglo-American librarian (born 1941)

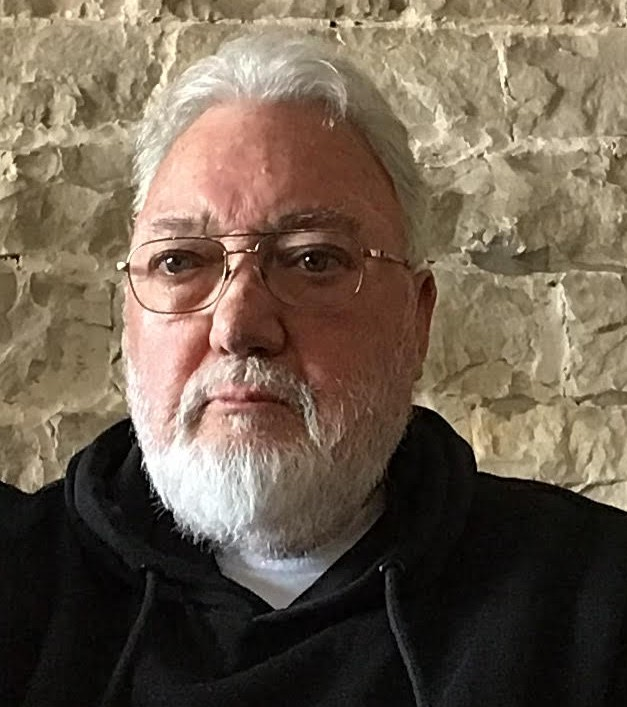

President of the American Library Association
- In office 2005–2006
- Preceded by: Carol A. Brey-Casiano
- Succeeded by: Leslie Burger

Personal details
- Born: 6 March 1941 (age 85) Witney, Oxfordshire, England
- Occupation: Librarian
- Writing career
- Genre: Librarianship
- Notable works: Our Singular Strengths: Meditations for Librarians (1997); Our Enduring Values (2000); The Enduring Library (2003); Anglo-American Cataloging Rules, 2nd ed (2005)

Michael Gorman (born 6 March 1941) is a British-born librarian, library scholar and writer. During his tenure as president of the American Library Association (ALA), he was vocal in his opinions on a range of subjects, notably technology and education. He currently lives in Chicago with his wife, Anne Reuland, an academic administrator at Loyola University.

Gorman's principles of librarianship derive from core liberal, democratic and humanist values, and he is noted for his traditional views. A key influence is S.R. Ranganathan, whom he regarded as "the greatest figure of librarianship in the 20th century." He maintains that it is through focusing on core professional values that librarians will facilitate personal growth and enhance the success of their institutions.

== Life and career ==
Gorman was born on 6 March 1941, in Freeland House just outside the village of Freeland near Witney, Oxfordshire. He grew up in London, England and became interested in libraries in part through his experiences at Hendon library and particularly its Children's Library run by a pioneer in the field Eileen Colwell. He attended Ealing Technical College (now University of West London) in London from 1964 to 1966.

- 1966 to 1977 – Head of Cataloguing at the British National Bibliography, a member of the British Library Planning Secretariat, and Head of the Office of Bibliographic Standards in the British Library.
- 1977 to 1988 – Director of Technical Services, Director of General Services, and Acting University Librarian at Library of the University of Illinois
- 1988 to 2007 – Dean of Library Services at the Henry Madden Library, California State University, Fresno, retiring in 2007.
- 1999 to 2000 – President of the Library and Information Technology Association.
- 2005 to 2006 – President of the American Library Association (ALA).

He has also taught at library schools in Britain and in the United States, most recently at the UCLA Graduate School of Education and Information Studies.

== Gorman's ideas ==
Gorman bases his principles of librarianship on core liberal, democratic and humanistic values. Underlying Gorman's defense of his values of librarianship is an apprehension regarding the future of the profession.

=== Eight central values of librarianship ===
In Our Enduring Values, Gorman identified eight central values of librarianship :

1. Stewardship : Gorman argues that librarians have a key role to play in preserving the human record for future generations. He maintains that librarians must pass on their best values to future information professionals.
2. Service : According to Gorman, an ethic of service should permeate all library policies and practices. Gorman stresses the duty of librarians to serve individuals, communities and societies is best fulfilled through a combination of professional skills, empathy and personal dedication. He argues that librarians need to act idealistically in a materialistic age.
3. Intellectual Freedom : Librarians lead the fight for intellectual freedom. Librarians, Gorman maintains, must zealously fight to protect free expression of thought, even if the ideas concerned contradict the librarian's own personal convictions.
4. Privacy : The freedom to access whatever materials an individual wishes, without the knowledge or interference of others. Gorman insists that confidentiality is a "bond of trust" between libraries and their patrons.
5. Rationalism : Gorman argues that libraries are "children of the Enlightenment and of rationalism" and that librarianship is a "supremely rational profession". This principle should underpin library procedures, and encourage the logical organization and classification of stock.
6. Commitment to literacy and learning : Reading is of central importance to literacy and lifelong learning. Gorman formulates a broad definition of 'literacy' beyond the mere ability to read, write and surf the net: his concept encompasses comprehensive, 'true' reading which is fulfilling and expands the mind.
7. Equity of access : Gorman argues that the 'digital divide' is but one manifestation of societal inequality and that all library services, in particular reference services, have a role to play in bridging the gap and providing equity of access.
8. Democracy : Gorman describes libraries as "supremely democratic institutions". Because democracy, he insists, depends on a "well-informed electorate" the library is integral to promoting education and maintaining democracy. If people are to exercise good judgement in electing representatives, they need to be highly informed and have access to written records: the library plays a central role therefore in maintaining democracy.

These Eight Values have been heavily influenced by the Buddhist Noble Eightfold Path.

==== Critique of his values ====
Gorman's selection and defence of his eight central values has attracted some criticism: for example, his championing of 'stewardship' as a central ethical tenet unique to librarianship, which cannot be shared by other information professionals, has been attacked as "too narrow and exclusive". His impassioned defence of intellectual freedom has also been dismissed in some quarters as "empty rhetoric" and "hyperbole". Gorman's views have also been dismissed by some as seemingly contradictory: on the one hand he praises Ranganathan's core values of library science; on the other he claims "information science" is a "bogus discipline". After a careful reading of Gorman's use of the phrase "bogus discipline," one can see that his beliefs are not in contradiction to Ranganathan, however, as he is supplying a critique of library science schools in what he views as a departure from the core values that should be taught.

=== Five New Laws of Librarianship ===
Gorman has expanded and added a more contemporary focus to Ranganathan's Five Laws of Library Science. The re-working of the classic five laws is an attempt "to meet the challenges of fast paced social and cultural changes affecting library users and the rapid proliferation of technology in library operations". The five laws are:

1. Libraries serve humanity : This law encompasses the assistance of individuals and the lofty ideal of the "furtherance of the higher aspirations of mankind". This law also implies an altruistic desire to provide quality service and to exceed the expectations of all users.
2. Respect all forms by which knowledge is communicated : Gorman advocates the use of various forms of "carriers of knowledge and information". He recommends a utilitarian approach – using whatever is more effective, cost effective, or advantageous.
3. Use technology intelligently to enhance service : Librarians, Gorman argues, must welcome and integrate new technologies. Yet he is clear that print-on-paper will remain the "pre-eminent medium for the communication of cumulative knowledge" Technology must be used to solve problems and improve services, and achieve cost-effectiveness, rather than adopted for its own sake.
4. Protect free access to knowledge : Allowing the records of the past to disappear is, from Gorman's perspective, "a kind of censorship". It is the librarian's responsibility to ensure intellectual freedom because Gorman asserts, a "society without uncensored libraries is a society open to tyranny".
5. Honor the past and create the future : Gorman advocates the need to balance nostalgia for a pre-digital past with the need to embrace new technologies, in a selective way based upon the extent to which they will enhance library service. He points to a need to respect the accomplishments of predecessors in the field of information science, whilst celebrating new developments in the field of librarianship.

== Educating the librarian ==
As part of his platform when running for ALA President in 2006, Gorman pledged to address what he called the education crisis.

The article "Whither Library Education?" set out his views on the current state of LIS education. He concluded that LIS education had become technocentric, male-dominated and out of touch with the needs of practitioners. This view was critiqued by Dillon and Norris, while both papers were critiqued by Pawley for their treatment of the issue of gender in librarianship.

Library and Information Science academics also responded in the professional press, questioning whether there was a crisis to address.

During his year in office, Gorman introduced an initiative intended to discuss the issue of education. Sessions were held with practitioners and academics. However, Gorman's traditional views may have led to younger librarians turning away from the idea and their views not being represented:

"Whatever the case, after all that effort we still don't know what current students and recent graduates really think about the educations upon which they spend so much money".

Despite the initiative, accreditation and curricula remained unchanged at the end of Gorman's tenure.

== Perspectives ==
Gorman's views on the Internet, digitisation of books, Google, citizen journalism, and information science are widely discussed. Two publications in particular caused heated debate, particularly within the librarian blogging community:

- the 2004 article "Google and God's Mind", originally printed in the Los Angeles Times
- the 2005 response article "Revenge of the Blog People!", originally printed in Library Journal.

=== Digitisation ===
In 2004 Google announced its plan to digitize the collections of five major research libraries. This would allow both Google and the libraries in question, The University of Michigan, Oxford, New York Public, Harvard and Stanford, to have access to digitized copies of millions of texts. Michael Gorman, then ALA president, responded to this announcement with an article in the Los Angeles Times 'Google and God's Mind' where he made clear his disapproval of the digitisation project. This disapproval was based on what he sees as a clear distinction between information and real knowledge. Gorman defines information as facts, data, images and quotations that can be used out of context, while real knowledge denotes literary and scholarly texts. This distinction informs Gorman's observations about online information retrieval which he characterises as being more focused on quick and easy access to facts.

In his later article, Gorman argues that to "Google boosters", speed is of the greatest import: "...just as it is to consumers of fast "food", but, as with fast food, rubbish is rubbish, no matter how speedily it is delivered". However, he suggests that real knowledge is acquired through a traditional scholarly approach to books.

Gorman later gave this opinion on digitising books:

...massive databases of digitized whole books, especially scholarly books, are expensive exercises in futility based on the staggering notion that, for the first time in history, one form of communication (electronic) will supplant and obliterate all previous forms.

Digital Initiatives Technology Librarian Peter Binkley discussed this view on his blog and also noted that a digitisation project does not necessarily involve shredding the books once they are scanned. He even suggests that Gorman himself highlights how digitised databases like Google's make it possible for users to find books and order them by inter-library loan. He also refutes Gorman's "for the first time in history" claim mentioning two previous "transformations" of information delivery over the last couple of millennia: the move from papyrus to vellum codex and the move from manuscript to the printed book. Overall, Binkley felt that, as ALA president-elect, Gorman should accept that digitisation of books is inevitable and that he should "make himself useful by working to ensure that this reformatting goes well".

In 2006, during his term as head of the ALA, Gorman attended the Online Information Conference in London, where he criticised the library profession for being "too interested in technology".

Gorman, however, is not opposed to digitising books per se, but feels that particular types of information, such as inter alia dictionaries, encyclopaedias and gazetteers are suitable candidates for digitisation, while other forms of real knowledge such as whole books (especially scholarly books) and large databases are not suitable for digitisation.

=== Blogging ===
Many of the responses to Gorman's article were voiced in the digital domain, with many library and information themed blogs criticising Gorman's opinions, although some bloggers agreed with some of Gorman's stance on digitisation. Gorman credits these responses as making him aware of blogging and leading to him writing Revenge of the Blog People!, in which he criticises the blogging medium and the opinions of his critics. This led to further heated discussion, firstly on blogs then in the professional press. Karen Schneider, an ALA member who writes the Free Range Librarian blog, dubbed the controversy "Gormangate" and shared her concerns about how his words portrayed the library profession, which was subsequently picked up by the professional press. Library Journal, which published Gorman's piece, commented on the decision to publish the piece, noting that the discussion had been beneficial and that:

The power of the blogosphere as a new way to communicate ideas and spread news electronically has been reinforced for all [Library Journal staff].

The journal went on to announce that they would be carrying a technology blog on their website.

One blogger, Michael Stephens, who wrote an open letter to Gorman, which he published on his blog, was so inspired by the subject that he chose to write his doctoral thesis on blogging in librarianship.

Michael Gorman went on to create blog entries of his own for the Encyclopædia Britannica Blog. In the entry "Web 2.0: The Sleep of Reason", he notes how the rise of Web 2.0 has contributed to "an increase in credulity and an associated flight from expertise". In "Siren Song of the Internet", he writes that, although the Internet has shaped our lives in many ways for the better, "we must exercise judgment, use digital resources intelligently, and import into the digital world the values that have pervaded scholarship in Western societies for many centuries". In "Jabberwiki: The Educational Response", he states that discussed how the Web offers texts that are of "doubtful or unestablishable authenticity" how using the Web for research can lead to incomplete research, and the dubious nature of Web-based learning. Finally, in "Challenging the Technophiles", Gorman argues in favor of "sustained reading of complex texts" but notes that Google and the Internet are not helpful in that endeavor.

=== Personal opinions and spokesmanship ===
Despite holding such an influential position in the American Library Association, Gorman has made it clear that many of his criticisms are personal and not representative of the ALA. For example, on technology and the Google digitisation, Gorman says:

"The Google project has been enthusiastically embraced and I think that is a mistake. I am not speaking on behalf of the ALA. That has no position on the Google digitisation project. I, on the other hand, do".

While Gorman maintains that he is voicing his own opinion, it was commented that when he is identified as the president of the largest professional library organisation in North America:

...his words have huge legal, political and economic consequences for the entire information science profession.

In regards to Wikipedia, Gorman once stated that "a professor who encourages the use of Wikipedia is the intellectual equivalent of a dietician who recommends a steady diet of Big Macs with everything".

Other commentators have also noted that irrespective of his protestations, the perception on the wider world and the media is that Gorman represents the profession and this can be detrimental to public perception of librarians.

=== Educating people ===
Gorman noted with alarm the results of an adult literacy assessment, which showed that reading proficiency of college graduates has declined in the past decade. He said he has been shocked by how few new freshmen understand how to use basic library systems, or enjoy reading for pleasure. "There is a failure in the core values of education," he said. "They're told to go to college in order to get a better job -- and that's okay. But the real task is to produce educated people."

Gorman has spoken extensively on the problems facing library education, particularly in the USA. He proposes the need to restructure library education in the 21st century, focusing on changes in curricula, faculty, and diversity in library education. Gorman believes that students are too focused on learning without goals in mind and that educators are too inclined to change everything just because the internet and all its resources has arrived and that instead, it should be used as an accompaniment to existing educational methods.

=== The importance of the book ===
Since his first book (with Walt Crawford), Gorman has stressed the importance of the book in the place of the library and Gorman has suggested that only books can bestow true knowledge on the reader. He emphasises the importance of the book throughout his works. He has expressed concern at the way research has become simply typing a few works in a search engine and says that serious research is impossible to carry out using this method without the additional reading of books.

=== Spirituality in librarianship ===
==== Christianity ====
Michael Gorman presented Our Enduring Values to the Association of Christian Libraries (ACL) and further reviews of his book have suggested that the eight proposed values which librarians should follow are more closely related to biblical theism than the humanistic beliefs Gorman believes. Further work by the ACL has developed ideas relating to the formulation of a Christian approach to library values.

==== Ethical beliefs ====
In Gorman's publications, he focuses on the importance on the preserving of information and knowledge and the importance of the librarian in helping to achieve this. In Gorman's eight values, he stresses the importance of a librarian having strong values and an ethical stance because these will help the librarian in their job. Failure is bearable because the decisions that caused that failure are based on a person's own beliefs and a person secure in their values is more likely to have higher self-esteem. The importance of librarians reflecting on their own decisions and responsibilities can be seen in Our Singular Strengths and Our Own Selves which feature meditations for librarians, which librarians can use to reaffirm their own profession.

== Publications ==
Gorman has written extensively about librarianship and issues in library science in the professional and academic press, as well as editing and authoring several books, including:

- Anglo-American Cataloging Rules, 2nd ed (2005) ALA Editions; 2nd edition ISBN 978-0-8389-3555-2 – Gorman was the first editor of the Anglo-American Cataloging Rules second edition in 1978. AACR2 is one of the most popular cataloguing systems in the world; this guidebook accompanies the system, and aims to explain the rules for cataloguing library materials in simplified terms for practitioners and students.
- The Concise AACR2 (2004) Facet Publishing; 4th revised edition ISBN 1-85604-540-4 – now in its fourth edition, this revision aims to explain the more generally applicable AACR2 rules for cataloguing library materials for practitioners and students who are in less complicated library and bibliographic environments. It is intended for users who do not require extensive detail, but prefer a summary of AACR2 practice.
- Future Libraries: Dreams, Madness, and Reality (with Walt Crawford) ALA Editions ISBN 0-8389-0647-8 – co-written with Walt Crawford, Gorman argues that libraries can and should welcome advanced technologies while preserving their traditional role as service-oriented repositories of organised information and knowledge. He states that virtual libraries will destroy the impact libraries have on society, and as a result proposes what he calls a "human-oriented" approach to technology. A review in the Journal of the American Society for Information Science and Technology stated "As the chapters unfold, a wealth of important information and observations about digital technology is presented, particularly the failure of computers to correlate with the often hyperbolic gush of promise for a more economical, streamlined, and utilitarian workplace.", while another reviewer argued that some of the points from the book are ludicrous and suggests that the impact of technological advancements and the longevity of printed works has been exaggerated and instead could lead to a "dangerous complacency" within the profession.
- Our Singular Strengths: Meditations for Librarians (1997) ALA Editions ISBN 0-8389-0724-5 – this book, precursor to Our Own Selves, is a collection of 144 meditations with a short essay and resolution.
- Since 2008, Gorman has written articles on English for the now defunct Vocabula Review.
- He has written essays on Dickens, paratext, P.G.Wodehouse, and James Joyce for The Caxtonian, the magazine of the Caxton Club.
- Technical Services Today and Tomorrow (1998) Greenwood Press; 2nd revised edition ISBN 1-56308-590-9 – This book discusses the issues surrounding technology and libraries, centred on the technical services in libraries with views on its future. The four main sections deal with acquisition, bibliographic control, automation and administration. It aims to provide an overview of the way in which technical services are building on the foundations of past work to overcome the new challenges of the present, and aims to remind readers of the technical core of librarians' activities. Like many of Gorman's other books, this text is primarily intended as an academic textbook, and Philip Hider in Library Management wrote that "this book would serve as a primer for library school students".
- Our Enduring Values: Librarianship in the 21st Century (2000) ALA Editions ISBN 0-8389-0785-7 -in this work, Gorman attempts to define the role of both library and librarians, discussing the core values of the profession. Gorman proposes eight values of librarianship which he believes are the principles which underpin the profession and, in turn, underpin democracy. The books considers the role of the library today, librarianship in the 21st century, what patrons and communities want from their libraries, the effects of new and changing technology on libraries, and ways to maintain the core values of librarianship into the future. Some professionals have criticised the book for some of the personal opinions on which Gorman focuses, and questioned its suitability as an academic textbook for the library and information sector.
- The Enduring Library: Technology, Tradition, and the Quest for Balance (2003) ALA Editions ISBN 0-8389-0846-2 – This book discusses the issues surrounding traditional library services and the ideas of technology dominance. Gorman's argument is that to comprehend the influence of technology on society and libraries, we need to understand the history and development of technology. He claims that libraries have forever been affected by technology, suggesting we are in a significant point in the development and evolution of libraries. The book surveys the digital world and the internet, library work and the future of libraries, with special focus on reference and cataloguing. It also examines the impact of modern living on information overload and stress
- Our Own Selves: More Meditations for Librarians (2005) ALA Editions ISBN 978-0-8389-0896-9. – 100 essays focusing on the issues central to the library profession. This is a follow-up to Gorman's earlier work, Our Singular Strengths (1997).
- Our Enduring Values Revisited: Librarianship in an Ever-Changing World (2015) ALA Editions ISBN 978-0-8389-1300-0
- Since 2019 he has been editor of the Caxtonian.

== Awards ==
- Margaret Mann Citation (1979)
- Melvil Dewey Medal (1992)
- Blackwell's Scholarship Award (1997)
- California Library Association/Access, Collections, Technical Services Section Award of Achievement (1999)
- Highsmith Award (2001)
- Honorary Doctorate, Thames Valley University (2008)
- Haycock Award (2010)
- California Library Association/California Library Hall of Fame (2012)

== Memberships ==
- ALA Council 1991–1995, 2002–2006
- ALA Executive Board until 2007
- Fellow of the Library Association 1979
- Honorary Fellow of CILIP 2005

Non-profit organization positions
Preceded by Carol A. Brey-Casiano	President of the American Library Association; 2005–2006	Succeeded by Leslie Burger
