= BIGWIG (library organization) =

Division of the American Library Association

BIGWIG is an interest group for the Library Information and Technology Association, a division of the American Library Association.

== Naming and Purpose ==
BIGWIG was founded in 2006 as an Interest Group for the Library Information Technology Association (LITA), a division of the American Library Association. The name was an acronym for "Blog, Interactive Groupware, and Wiki Interest Group" - as these were some of the first Web 2.0 technologies to attain popular usage within libraries. Since that time, the group has broadened its scope to include the exploration of other Web 2.0 software and techniques.

== Events ==
In 2007, BIGWIG began organizing the Social Software Showcase, held during the American Library Association Annual Meeting.

This event showcases new and emerging technologies and specifically social software - by allowing presenters to post their presentations online before the conference - and then allowing attendees to meet with presenters in small groups to discuss and see these technologies in action.

== See also ==
- List of libraries in the United States
