= Association of Research Libraries =

North American nonprofit organization

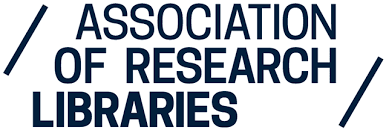
- Formation: December 29, 1932, in Chicago, Illinois
- Type: Nonprofit organization
- Headquarters: Washington, D.C., U.S.
- Location(s): United States; Canada
- Members: 125
- President: Melissa Just, University of Southern California
- Key people: Andrew K. Pace (Executive Director)
- Website: arl.org

The Association of Research Libraries (ARL) is a nonprofit membership organization of research libraries and archives in major public and private universities, federal government agencies, and large public institutions in the United States and Canada. ARL champions research libraries and archives, develops visionary leaders, and shapes policy for the equitable advancement of knowledge.

ARL member libraries make up a large portion of the academic and research library marketplace, spending approximately $4.5 billion every year on information resources and actively engaging in the development of new models of scholarly communications.

ARL co-founded an affiliate organization, the Coalition for Networked Information (CNI), in 1990. CNI is a joint program of ARL and Educause, a nonprofit association whose mission is to advance higher education through the use of information technology. ARL is also a member of the Library Copyright Alliance, a consortium of major library associations that have joined forces to address copyright issues affecting libraries and their patrons.

== History 1932–1962 ==
The Association of Research Libraries held its first meeting in Chicago on December 29, 1932. At that time, its membership included 42 major university and research libraries. This first meeting was primarily organizational. The prepared constitution and bylaws were accepted and each library adopted a constitution that stated, "the object shall be, by cooperative effort, to develop and increase the resources and usefulness of the research collections in American libraries." Donald B. Gilchrist was elected as Executive Secretary. The Advisory Committee members included J. Christian Bay (John Crerar Library), James T. Gerould (Princeton University), Harold L. Leupp (University of California – Berkeley), C. C. Williamson (Columbia University), and Phineas L. Windsor (Illinois University).

The first venture to be undertaken by ARL was a project for the collection of data regarding manuscript collections. This project had little support and was relatively short-lived. However, the second project, the annual listings of the titles of the PhD theses was a significant contribution to the profession. The first volume of Doctoral Dissertations Accepted by American Universities was compiled by ARL and was published by H. W. Wilson in 1933. This series of publications would become the predecessor of what is now Dissertation Abstracts. Passed into law in 1933, the National Industrial Recovery Act allowed trade associations and industry representatives to draft industrial codes of fair competition. In order to encourage the preservation of these records, ARL published Address List of Local Code Authorities under N.R.A.: 1933-1935 in 1933 which had been prepared by the National Recovery Administration for the Joint Committee on Materials for Research established by the American Council of Learned Societies and the National Research Council. Two new members were added to ARL in 1936; Grosvenor Library (Buffalo) and New York University. The National Archives had expressed interest in joining but rejected the subsequent invitation.

ARL initiated two projects in 1937; publication of the Library of Congress catalog and an investigation into the pricing policy of the Wilson Company. In December 1937, Keyes Metcalf (Harvard University) succeeded Gilchrist as Executive Secretary. Gilchrist continued to edit Doctoral Dissertations Accepted by American Universities and serve on the Wilson Pricing Policy Committee. The University of California – Los Angeles joined the ARL in 1937. Louisiana State University joined ARL in 1938. Keyes's term ended in 1940 and he was replaced by Paul N. Rice (New York Public Library).

In a meeting in January 1942, a proposal for the division of acquisition responsibility was presented. Rice formed a Committee on Postwar Competition in Book Purchases. Members of this committee included Archibald MacLeish (Library of Congress), Keyes D. Metcalf, and Robert Downs (future Director of Libraries at the University of Illinois). This program served as a pilot project for the Farmington Plan. As part of the Library of Congress project, the ARL sponsored the publication of A Catalog of Books Represented by L.C. Printed Cards in 1942.

A two-day meeting was held in March 1944 to discuss a multitude of issues. Resulting from the meeting were a number of committees: Committee on Division of Responsibility for the Acquisition and Recording of Research Materials, Committee to Investigate the Wilson Proposal for Publication of LC Catalog Cards in Book Form, Committee on Reprinting the British Museum Catalog, Committee on Securing Complete Files of Foreign Documents in Certain Designated American Libraries, Committee on Standards for Graduate Colleges, Committee on Statistics of Library Holdings, Committee to Study Plans of Cancellation of Library Discards, Joint Committee on Government Documents, and Joint Committee on Cooperative Buying of Chinese Materials. In 1946, Charles E. David (University of Pennsylvania) was elected Executive Secretary.

The Farmington Plan was initiated in January 1948 covering limited to monographs published in France, Sweden, and Switzerland by 52 cooperating libraries. The overhead expenses were paid for by a grant from the Carnegie Corporation. Also in 1948, ARL Minutes were submitted for publication in College & Research Libraries for the first time.

Robert A. Miller was elected Executive Secretary in December 1951. The Foreign Newspaper Microfilm project was initiated in January 1956. It has 46 subscribers and a first year budget of $14,000. William S. Dix, the 6th Executive Secretary, was elected in 1957. His term lasted only 2 years as he was elected Chairman of the U.S. National Commission for UNESCO in 1959. Stephen A. McCarthy was elected in 1960.

On December 5, 1961, the ARL was incorporated under the laws of the District of Columbia. In May 1962, the National Science Foundation approved a 2-year grant of $58,350 towards the establishment of a full-time ARL Secretariat. The June 1962 invitation meeting brought the total number of ARL members to 72. In 1963, ARL assumed responsibility of publishing annual library statistics.

== Leadership ==
=== Executive Secretaries 1932–1962 ===
Executive Secretaries 1932-1962
Date(s)	Name	Affiliation
1932-37	Donald B. Gilchrist	University of Rochester
1938-41	Keyes D. Metcalf	Harvard University
1942-46	Paul N. Rice	New York Public Library
1947-51	Charles W. David	University of Pennsylvania
1952-56	Robert A. Miller	Indiana University
1957-59	William S. Dix	Princeton University
1960-62	Stephen A. McCarthy	Cornell University

=== Executive Directors 1963–present ===
Executive Directors 1963–present
Date(s)	Name
1963-67	James E. Skipper
1967	Donald F. Cameron
1968-74	Stephen A. McCarthy
1975-76	John P. McDonald
1977-79	John G. Lorenz
1980-81	Ralph E. McCoy
1981-87	Shirley Echelman
1988-07	Duane E. Webster
2008-12	Charles B. Lowry
2013-2017	Elliott Shore
2018 (Jan.-Mar.)	Anne Kenney (interim)
2018-2024	Mary Lee Kennedy
2024–	Andrew K. Pace

=== Presidents 1962–present ===
Presidents 1962–present
Date(s)	Name	Affiliation
1962-63	William S. Dix	Princeton University
1963	Robert Vosper	University of California, Los Angeles
1964	Richard H. Logsdon	Columbia University
1965	Edward G. Freehafer	New York Public Library
1966	Foster E. Mohrhardt	National Agricultural Library
1967	Rutherford D. Rogers	Stanford University
1968	Andrew J. Eaton	Washington University
1969	Douglas W. Bryant	Harvard University
1970	Warren J. Haas	Columbia University
1971	Thomas R. Buckman	Northwestern University
1971-72	John P. McDonald	University of Connecticut
1973	William S. Budington	John Crerar Library
1974	Ralph H. Hopp	University of Minnesota
1975	Richard De Gennaro	University of Pennsylvania
1976	Virginia P. Whitney	Rutgers University
1977	Edward C. Lathem	Dartmouth College
1978	Ray W. Frantz	University of Virginia
1979	LeMoyne Anderson	Colorado State University
1980	Connie Dunlap	Duke University
1981	Jay K. Lucker	Massachusetts Institute of Technology
1982	Millicent D. Abell	University of California, San Diego
1983	James E. Govan	University of North Carolina
1984	Eldred Smith	University of Minnesota
1985	Richard J. Talbot	University of Massachusetts
1986	Anne Woodsworth	University of Pittsburgh
1987	Herbert F. Johnson	Emory University
1988	Elaine Sloan	Indiana University
1989	Charles E. Miller	Florida State University
1990	Martin Runkle	University of Chicago
1991	Marilyn D. Sharrow	University of California, Davis
1992	Arthur Curley	Boston Public Library
1993	Susan Nutter	North Carolina State University
1994	John Black	University of Guelph
1995	Jerry Campbell	Duke University
1996	Nancy Cline	Pennsylvania State University
1997	Gloria Werner	University of California, Los Angeles
1998	James G. Neal	Johns Hopkins University
1999	Betty G. Bengtson	University of Washington
2000	Kenneth Frazier	University of Wisconsin
2001	Shirley K. Baker	Washington University in St. Louis
2002	Paula T. Kaufman	University of Illinois, Urbana-Champaign
2003	Fred Heath	Texas A&M University
2004	Sarah Thomas	Cornell University
2005	Ann J. Wolpert	Massachusetts Institute of Technology
2006	Brian E. C. Schottlaender	University of California, San Diego
2007	Sherrie Schmidt	Arizona State University
2008	Marianne I. Gaunt	Rutgers University
2009	Thomas C. Leonard	University of California, Berkeley
2010	Brinley Franklin	University of Connecticut
2011	Carol A. Mandel	New York University
2012	Winston Tabb	Johns Hopkins University
2013	Wendy Pradt Lougee	University of Minnesota
2014	Carol Pitts Diedrichs	Ohio State University
2015	Deborah Jakubs	Duke University
2016	Larry Alford	University of Toronto
2017	Mary Case	University of Illinois at Chicago
2018	Mary Ann Mavrinac	University of Rochester
2019	Susan Gibbons	Yale University
2020	Lorraine Haricombe	The University of Texas at Austin
2021	John Culshaw	The University of Iowa
2022	K. Matthew Dames	University of Notre Dame
2023	Susan Parker	University of British Columbia
2024	Trevor A. Dawes	University of Delaware
2025	Rhea Ballard-Thrower	University of Illinois Chicago
2026	Melissa Just	University of Southern California

== Members ==
The association boasts members in both Canada and the United States. Currently, the following institutions are members of the organization.

- Arizona State University
- Atlanta University Center
- Auburn University
- Boston College
- Boston Public Library
- Boston University
- Brigham Young University
- Brown University
- Case Western Reserve University
- Center for Research Libraries
- Clemson University
- Colorado State University
- Columbia University
- Cornell University
- Dartmouth College
- Duke University
- Emory University
- Florida State University
- George Washington University
- Georgetown University
- Georgia Tech
- Harvard University
- Howard University
- Indiana University Bloomington
- Iowa State University
- Johns Hopkins University
- Kent State University
- Library of Congress
- Louisiana State University
- McGill University
- McMaster University
- Michigan State University
- Mississippi State University
- United States National Agricultural Library
- United States National Library of Medicine
- New York Public Library
- New York University
- North Carolina State University
- Northwestern University
- Ohio State University
- Ohio University
- Oklahoma State University–Stillwater
- Pennsylvania State University
- Princeton University
- Purdue University
- Queen's University at Kingston
- Rice University
- Rutgers University
- Simon Fraser University
- Smithsonian Institution
- Southern Illinois University Carbondale
- Stony Brook University
- Syracuse University
- Temple University
- Texas A&M University
- Texas State University
- Texas Tech University
- Tulane University
- University of Alabama
- University at Albany, SUNY
- University of Arizona
- University of British Columbia
- University at Buffalo
- University of Calgary
- University of California, Berkeley
- University of California, Davis
- University of California, Irvine
- University of California, Los Angeles
- University of California, Riverside
- University of California, San Diego
- University of California, Santa Barbara
- University of California, Santa Cruz
- University of Cincinnati
- University of Colorado Boulder
- University of Connecticut
- University of Delaware
- University of Florida
- University of Georgia
- University of Hawaiʻi at Mānoa
- University of Houston
- University of Illinois at Chicago
- University of Illinois Urbana-Champaign
- University of Iowa
- University of Kansas
- University of Kentucky
- Université Laval
- University of Louisville
- University of Manitoba
- University of Maryland, College Park
- University of Massachusetts Amherst
- University of Miami
- University of Michigan
- University of Minnesota
- University of Missouri
- University of Nebraska–Lincoln
- University of Nevada, Las Vegas
- University of New Mexico
- University of North Carolina at Chapel Hill
- University of North Texas
- University of Notre Dame
- University of Oklahoma
- University of Ottawa
- University of Pennsylvania
- University of Pittsburgh
- University of Rochester
- University of Saskatchewan
- University of South Carolina
- University of Southern California
- University of Texas at Austin
- University of Tennessee
- University of Toronto
- University of Utah
- University of Virginia
- University of Washington
- University of Waterloo
- University of Western Ontario
- University of Wisconsin–Madison
- Vanderbilt University
- Virginia Commonwealth University
- Virginia Tech
- Washington State University
- Washington University in St. Louis
- Wayne State University
- Yale University
- York University

== See also ==
- American Library Association
- International Federation of Library Associations
- Association of College and Research Libraries
- Scholarly Publishing and Academic Resources Coalition
- List of libraries in the United States
- Lists of libraries
