= Walt Crawford =

American writer

- Born: 1945 (age 80–81); Modesto, California
- Education: University of California, Berkeley
- Writing career
- Genre: Non-fiction

Walt Crawford is an American writer specializing in libraries. He is primarily concerned with technology-related issues in the library sector. He has also written extensively on open access, publishing detailed surveys of gold open access journals based on data in the Directory of Open Access Journals.

Crawford worked for the California-based national consortium Research Libraries Group (RLG) from 1979 to 2006. He was president of the Library and Information Technology Association (LITA), a division of the American Library Association (ALA) in 1992–3.

Crawford is the author of a variety of articles and lectures, and books. His book Future Libraries (1995), coauthored with Michael Gorman, is held by more than 1000 libraries. His other books include Open Access (2011), Librarian's Guide to Micropublishing (2012), and MARC for Library Use (1988). Among other things, he publishes the online journal "Cites & Insights", of which he is the main author.
