= Mary R. Somerville =

American librarian

President of the American Library Association
- In office 1996–1997
- Preceded by: Betty J. Turock
- Succeeded by: Barbara J. Ford

Personal details
- Born: Birmingham, Alabama, US
- Education: University of North Carolina; University of Colorado; University of Oklahoma
- Occupation: Librarian

Mary R. Somerville is an American librarian who served as president of the American Library Association from 1996 to 1997; she is best known for her advocacy for children's literacy and work as a library administrator.

== Education and career ==
Somerville was born and raised in Birmingham, Alabama. She received a Bachelor of Arts degree from the University of North Carolina and went on to earn a Masters of Arts in English at the University of Colorado, and a Master of Library Science at the University of Oklahoma. Her work in libraries was varied and included stints in youth librarianship, automation, and reference at Broward County Library, Louisville Free Public Library, and Lincoln City Libraries.

Somerville served as the director of the Miami-Dade Public Library System from 1994 until her retirement in 1998. She oversaw the renovation of one-third of the system's libraries and the reopening of libraries that had been damaged by Hurricane Andrew.

== Library leadership ==
Somerville served as the president of the Association for Library Service to Children from 1987 to 1988. During that time she participated in a Soviet-American symposium on public library services to children within the Soviet Union.

She was the president of the American Library Association from 1996 to 1997. Somerville's presidential theme was "Kids Can't Wait," emphasizing the importance of children's literacy, especially preschool and preteen children. An important initiative of Somerville's presidency was the creation of the ALA's Emerging Leaders Institute, a program to develop leadership in those new to the library profession.

She has also spoken and consulted internationally through the United States Information Agency and the State Department in South Africa and Brazil.
