= Indigenous librarianship =

Indigenous perspective in library work

Indigenous librarianship is a distinct field of librarianship that brings Indigenous approaches to areas such as knowledge organization, collection development, library and information services, language and cultural practices, and education. The Encyclopedia of Library and Information Sciences (3rd ed.) states that Indigenous librarianship emerged as a "distinct field of practice and an arena for international scholarship in the late twentieth century bolstered by a global recognition of the value and vulnerability of Indigenous knowledge systems, and of the right of Indigenous peoples to control them."

Indigenous librarianship is supported by a number of professional associations, a growing body of research, and both professional and educational initiatives. Indigenous librarianship can be practised by both Indigenous and non-Indigenous librarians and exists all over the world, including across Aotearoa (New Zealand), Australia, Hawai'i, Sápmi (Northern Europe and Russia), South America, Sudan, Turtle Island (North America), and Udmurtia. To date, the largest centres of activity for Indigenous librarianship are in Aotearoa and in what are now known as Australia, Canada, and the United States.

Indigenous librarianship prioritizes the interests, practices, needs, and support of Indigenous peoples. Indigenous culture and concerns are therefore used to guide and implement library and information practices, as well as to ensure that the practices of Indigenous librarianship advance Indigenous interests, such as sovereignty and self-determination. Frameworks such as the United Nations Declaration on the Rights of Indigenous Peoples (UNDRIP) are other key mechanisms for ensuring that practice and research are ethical and for centring Indigenous rights. For example, using appropriate and respectful cultural protocols for the handling of Indigenous knowledge, including traditional knowledge, is one way Indigenous librarianship is practised.

Indigenous Librarianship can contrast with or be in conflict with non-Indigenous librarianship practices and research, which are often heavily influenced by colonialism. As Indigenous librarianship is connected to the advancement of Indigenous rights it has been deemed to be one of the more political forms of librarianship.

== Education programs for Indigenous librarianship ==
=== North America ===
In North America librarians are typically expected to have a master's degree from a program accredited by the ALA. Some universities offer specialized programs in Indigenous librarianship. The University of British Columbia offers a First Nation Curriculum Concentration for both their Master of Archival Studies and Master of Library and Information Studies. At the University of Arizona School of Information, M.A. Library and Information Science students can apply to the Knowledge River Program, which focuses on the information needs of Latino, Native American and Black communities. In 2021, the Bridging Knowledge program was announced, which will support 15 American Indian, Alaska Native, and Native Hawaiian students in earning their Masters of Library and Information Science through San José State University School of Information.

Other educational bodies and programs related to Indigenous librarianship and Indigenous knowledge practices include:

- Alaska Native Knowledge Network
- First Nations University of Canada (University of Regina)
- iNative Research Group (University of Washington Information School)
- iPortal: Indigenous Studies Portal Research Tool (University of Saskatchewan)
- Indigenous Library and Information Studies in a Canadian Context (University of Alberta)
- Indigenous Nations Library Program (University of New Mexico)
- Mashantucket Pequot Museum & Research Center
- National Breath of Life Archival Institute for Indigenous Languages (Miami University)
- The Sustainable Heritage Network (Washington State University)
- Tribal College Librarians Professional Development Institute (Montana State University)

== Indigenous peoples and Indigenous librarianship ==
Indigenous peoples hold unique languages and ways of knowing, often including their relationship to and stewardship of their lands. According to the United Nations (UN), there are "more than 476 million Indigenous peoples living in all regions of the world" and the UN emphasizes the importance of understanding the term Indigenous to be based on "self-identification as Indigenous peoples" at both individual and community levels. As such, no single official definition of the term Indigenous has been adopted by the UN. Moreover, the term Indigenous is not acceptable to all peoples and there are many other terms that may be used instead of, or alongside, the term Indigenous by individuals, communities, or groups.

The International Federation of Library Associations and Institutions (IFLA) reflects a similar approach to understanding the term Indigenous as that of the UN. IFLA chose to adopt Loriene Roy's stance that "Indigenous people know who they are" rather than trying to define Indigenous peoples monolithically.

Indigenous librarianship recognizes the need to protect Indigenous ways of knowing. It resists colonizing and other oppressive practices that historically and currently exclude Indigenous knowledges or push them to the margins in institutions such as libraries. Moreover, due to these same forces of colonization and oppression, Indigenous individuals and their expertise are often drastically underrepresented in LIS professions.

Part of the work of Indigenous librarianship is to create more space and advocate for Indigenous peoples within Indigenous librarianship itself, and in the field of LIS more broadly. Indigenous librarianship also works to ensure that Indigenous peoples have access to information organizations that accurately and respectfully reflect their cultures, knowledges, and protocols.

== Indigenous libraries ==
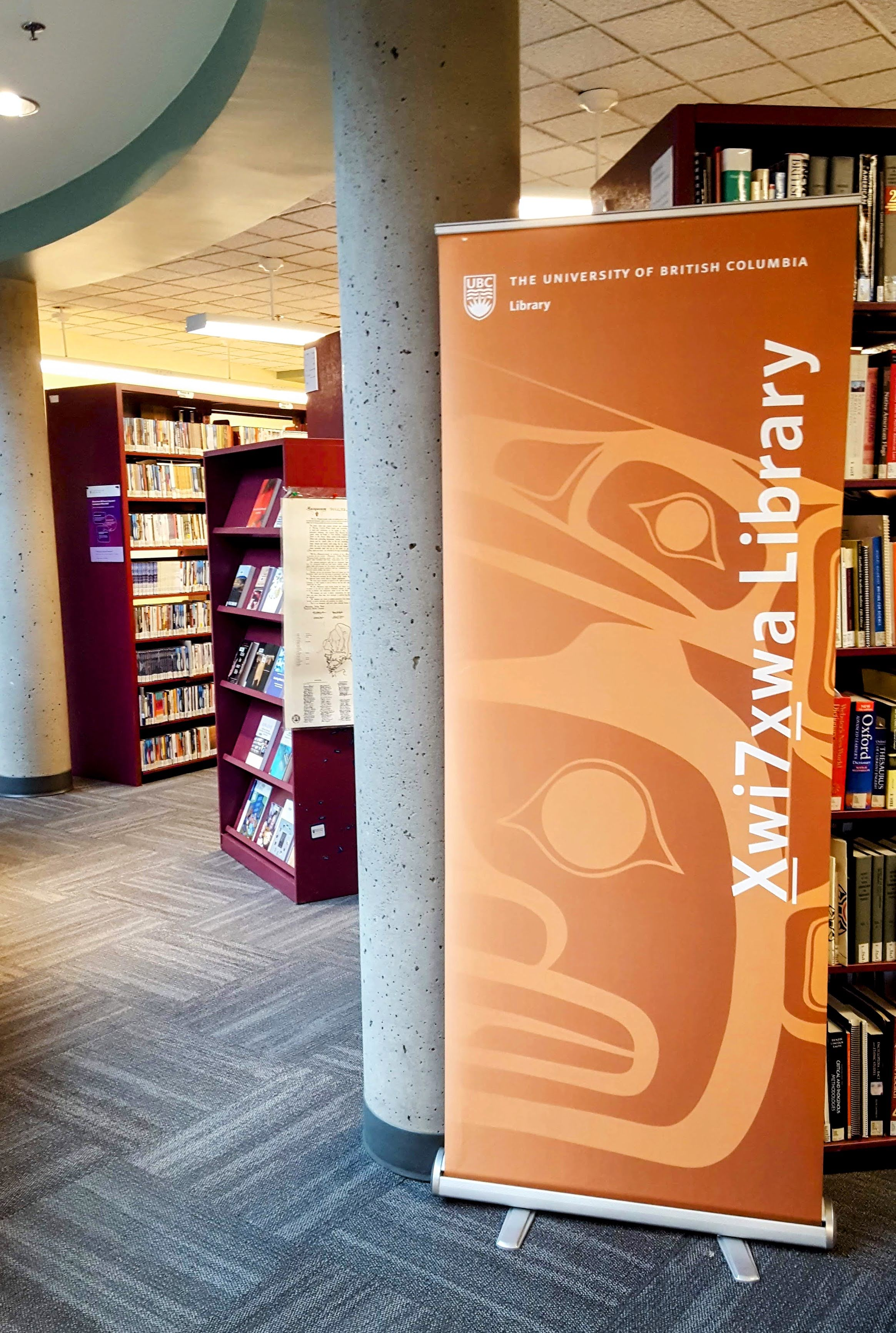
X̱wi7x̱wa Library, First Nations House of Learning, University of British Columbia

There are several libraries throughout the world that focus on serving Indigenous communities and that centre Indigenous knowledge practices. These include:

- The Xwi7xwa Library, which is a branch of the University of British Columbia Library, in Vancouver Canada. The Xwi7xwa Library has a collection focusing on First Nations in British Columbia and organizes its collection with a modified version of the Brian Deer Classification System.
- The State Library of Queensland created kuril dhagun, which was the first Indigenous Knowledge Centre in a State Library in Australia. Kuril dhagun is staffed by a team of Aboriginal and Torres Strait Islander staff and acts as a meeting and learning space for the Aboriginal and Torres Strait Islander community.
- A variety of Tribal Libraries in America including Haines Borough Public Library in Alaska, the James E. Shanley Tribal Library, and the Kinyaa'áanii Charlie Benally Library. Tribal Libraries act as libraries as well as archives, language repositories, and community gathering places. Tribal Libraries are also a source of grassroots development that gave rise to the field of Indigenous Librarianship.
- American Indian Resource Center (LA County Library)
- Australian Institute of Aboriginal and Torres Strait Islander Studies Collections
- Blackfoot Digital Library
- Bruce Parisian Library (Victoria Native Friendship Centre)
- Chief George Manuel Memorial Indigenous Library
- Institute of American Indian Arts Library
- National Center for Truth and Reconciliation (University of Manitoba)
- National Indian Law Library (Native American Rights Fund)
- Union of British Columbia Indian Chiefs Library & Archives

== Notable Indigenous librarians and researchers ==
- Brian Deer, Tionerahtoken (Mohawk) librarian, creator of the Brian Deer Classification System
- Camille Callison, member of the Tsesk iye (Crow) Clan of the Tahltan Nation, Indigenous librarian, archivist, academic, cultural activist, University Librarian at the University of the Fraser Valley.
- Gene Joseph, Wet'suwet'en Nadleh'dena First Nations librarian, founding librarian of the Xwi7xwa Library
- Cheryl Metoyer, Eastern Band Cherokee researcher and professor of library and information science
- Anahera Morehu, Māori librarian
- Lotsee Patterson, Comanche librarian, educator, and founder of the American Indian Library Association (AILA)
- Lessa Kananiʻopua Pelayo-Lozada, multiracial Native Hawaiian raised on the Continent, American librarian
- Bernard Makoare
- Loriene Roy, Anishinabe, a member of the Minnesota Chippewa Tribe, and is enrolled on the White Earth Reservation, American scholar of Indigenous librarianship, past president of the ALA
- Velma S. Salabiye, Dine (Navajo) librarian, founding member of AILA
- Dr Kirsten Thorpe, Worimi from Port Stephens and a researcher in Indigenous protocols and decolonising practices in the libraries and archives from Australia.
- Rebecca Bateman, Weilwan and Gamilaroi from North West New South Wales, Australia, and Director Indigenous Engagement at the National Library of Australia.
- Nathan “Mudyi” Sentance, Wiradjuri from the Mowgee clan in Australia and a librarian who works across cultural and memory institutions.
- Ryan Stoker Wiradjuri from Dubbo, Australia, and librarian at the Aboriginal and Torres Strait Islander Data Archive (ATSIDA) at the University of Technology, Sydney.
- Tui Raven, Yamaji Nyungar from Western Australia and the creator of the Australian Guidelines for First Nations Collection Description a joint project between AIATSIS, ALIA, CAUL, CAVAL and NSLA.
- Raelee Lancaster, Wiradjuri and Biripi librarian and writer.
- Kua Swan, Gomeroi from Moree and Wiradjuri from Cowra, and a special collections librarian from Australia.
- Damien Webb, Palawa from South-East Tasmania, Australia, and an Indigenous engagement librarian.

== Professional associations, organizations, and committees ==
A number of national and international professional associations, organizations, and committees exist that support and otherwise intersect with the work of Indigenous librarianship.

=== International ===
- Expert Group on Indigenous Matters (International Council on Archives)
- Global Indigenous Data Alliance (GIDA)
- International Indigenous Librarians' Forum (IILF)
- International Federation of Library Associations Indigenous Matters Section
- Local and Indigenous Knowledge Systems (LINKS)
- Recommended Practice for Provenance of Indigenous Peoples' Data working group (IEEE)

=== Aotearoa New Zealand ===
- Te Rōpū Whakahau - a national body that represents Māori engaged in Libraries, Culture, Knowledge, Information, Communication and Systems Technology in Aotearoa New Zealand.
- Te Whakakaokao working group (Ngā Upoko Tukutuku)

=== Australia ===
- Aboriginal and Torres Strait Islander Library, Information and Resource Network
- Aboriginal and Torres Strait Islander Special Interest Group (Australian Society of Archivists)
- Indigenous Archives Collective

=== Canada ===
- Indigenous Advisory Circle (Library and Archives Canada)
- Indigenous Matters Committee (CFLA-FCAB)
- Indigitization: Tools for Digitizing and Sustaining Indigenous Knowledge
- First Nations Information Governance Center
- First Nations Interest Group (British Columbia Library Association)
- Manitoba Archival Information Network - Library of Congress Subject Heading (MAIN-LCSH) Working Group (Association for Manitoba Archives)
- National Indigenous Knowledge and Language Alliance (NIKLA)
- Response to the Report of the Truth and Reconciliation Commission Taskforce (Steering Committee on Canada's Archives)

=== United States ===
- American Indian Library Association (AILA)
- The Association of Tribal Archives, Libraries, and Museums (ATLA) - a nonprofit organization that focuses on preserving the cultural sovereignty of Indigenous nations, particularly in regards to GLAM studies and work. The organization holds workshops, conferences and institutes to help deliver these efforts.
- First Archivists Circle
- Nā Hawaiʻi ʻImi Loa
- Nā Hawaiʻi ʻImi Loa Hui Haumāna (student chapter of Nā Hawaiʻi ʻImi Loa)
- Native American Archives Section (subsection of the Society of American Archivists) - the subsection was created in 2005 as a way to discuss Indigenous issues in relation to archival studies. In 2018 they implemented the Protocols for Native American Archival Materials to bring these protocols to a wider array of archival settings.
- Rural, Native, and Tribal Libraries of All Kinds Committee - a committee that serves as a part of the American Library Association. They advocate for the needs of rural and Indigenous communities in regards to libraries. They also provide information on advocacy from libraries for Indigenous communities.

== Indigenous Knowledge Organization (IKO) ==
Compared with Knowledge Organization (KO), Indigenous Knowledge Organization (IKO) includes methodologies through which Indigenous peoples create protocols to help name, articulate, collate, and make accessible objects that indicate Indigenous knowledge.

One of the main criticisms that IKO scholars offer of existing KO practices is that traditional means of cataloguing and classifying knowledge result in the marginalization, omission, or misrepresentation of Indigenous topics. IKO scholars argue for the limitations of traditional classification systems used in the library workplace. In particular, the widely used Library of Congress Classification (LCC), Library of Congress Subject Headings (LCSH), and the Dewey Decimal System (DDC) schemes have been criticized for lacking terminology and categories specific to Indigenous Peoples and for ignoring the presence of localized epistemological schemes. For example, LCC has been criticized for using insensitive, outdated terms, such as its subject heading of "Indians of North America", and for failing to offer nuance for referring to varied Indigenous groups, such as First Nations, Inuit and Metis peoples.

Another key criticism made by IKO scholars is that, aside from erasure, current means of organizing materials of Indigenous peoples often reproduce Western disciplinary assumptions that risk 'othering' Indigenous communities in binary opposition to Western counterparts. These systems can "silence" the heterogeneity of Indigenous peoples and push aside practices that test for cultural appropriateness of classification, curriculum, and pedagogy. For example, under many Western schemes, Native Knowledge is frequently and incorrectly classified under 'American History', thus erasing the visibility of Indigenous history and making it seem as if Indigenous peoples are historical groups subsumed by Western history, rather than presenting them as the actively living, autonomous, modern cultures that they are.

=== Indigenous Knowledge Organization systems ===
There are a variety of alternative KO systems developed in response to the critiques offered by IKO scholars. For example, the University of Hawaii spearheaded the KVJ Law Classification Project in order to provide Indigenous legal expertise in re-classifying law materials. The Brian Deer Classification System is a specialized classification system for Indigenous materials. A modified version of the Brian Deer Classification System serves as the X̱wi7x̱wa Classification Scheme at the University of British Columbia's X̱wi7x̱wa Library. The National Library of New Zealand uses the Ngā Upoko Tukutuku (subject headings in te reo Māori) to better reflect Māori terminology and concepts relevant to the Māori community.

Other examples of IKO systems include:

- AIATSIS Pathways Thesauri
- First Nations House of Learning subject headings
- First Nations, Métis, Inuit - Indigenous Ontology (FNMIIO)
- Greater Victoria Public Library interim Indigenous subject headings
- Indigenous Subject Headings in MAIN
- Mukurtu CMS
- Murihiku Cultural Water Classification System

== Indigenous librarianship praxis ==
Given the wide geographic reach of Indigenous librarianship, and the diversity of Indigenous peoples who either are undertaking or are impacted by this work, there can be no universal protocols for Indigenous librarianship. Instead, these protocols must be established locally. However, Indigenous scholars Sandra Littletree, Miranda Belarde-Lewis, and Marisa Duarte point to the prominent role of relationality between living people, lands, objects, ancestors, and future generations across many iterations of Indigenous librarianship and frame this as a crucial feature of Indigenous librarianship praxis.

As a praxis, Indigenous librarianship is attuned to the ways in which knowledge cannot be separated from its relationships with people, places, objects, and the rest of its ecology. As described by Alissa Cherry and Keshav Mukunda, "Indigenous knowledge systems are characterized by their holistic view of the world, in particular this means that knowledge cannot be separated from the individual or group holding it." The role of relationality is also evident, for example, in Deborah Lee's articulation of the three Rs of doing Indigenous research in LIS, namely, respect, reciprocity, and relationality.

Other expressions of this relationality can be traced through Loriene Roy's assertion that Indigenous librarianship places "less emphasis on tools than on the relationships between people and their connections to traditional knowledge", in Jessie Loyer's explication of practices of kinship within Indigenous information literacy practices, and Alison Krebs' statement that "as Indigenous peoples we exist within dynamic and interactive webs of relationship governed by mutual respect, reciprocity, and relational accountability".

This relationality means that "Indigenous peoples often remark that you cannot separate the part from the whole". Conversely, such a separation is often a characteristic of non-Indigenous LIS practices, including cataloguing and the conceptual and physical separation of libraries, archives, museums, and other places of cultural memory and heritage from each other. Furthermore, the praxis of Indigenous librarianship differs from "the broader field of library and information science" in that it shifts focus from "principles of controlled vocabulary, specificity, literary warrant, coherence and standardization, and moving from the general to the specific in subject categorization" in favour of a "more community-based approach, namely, a relational approach," which, in turn, gives rise more holistically to protocols and modes of knowledge exchange.

=== Indigenous protocols ===
Numerous protocols and standards exist for Indigenous communities throughout the world. These protocols act as best practices for an organization when dealing with Indigenous Peoples and materials and include the following:

- The Aboriginal and Torres Strait Islander Library and Information Resource Network (ATSILIRN) Protocols for Libraries, Archives and Information Services: These protocols were developed to improve the way information professionals seek to meet the information needs of Aboriginal and Torres Strait Islander peoples. The ATSILIRN Protocols were published in 1995 by the Australian Library and Information Association, and were updated in 2005, 2010, and again in 2012. The ATSILIRN Protocols were used as a base for the Working with Indigenous Collections resource by National and State Libraries Australia.
- CARE Principles of Indigenous Data Governance: Created by the Global Indigenous Data Alliance, the CARE Principles of Indigenous Data Governance focus on "the crucial role of data in advancing Indigenous innovation and self-determination".
- Culturally Responsive Guidelines for Alaska Public Libraries: Created by the Alaska Library Association, the Culturally Responsive Guidelines for Alaska Public Libraries were created out of the "belief that culturally appropriate service to indigenous peoples is a fundamental principle of Alaska libraries".
- Guidelines for Respecting Cultural Knowledge: Published by the Alaska Native Knowledge Network, these guidelines address "issues of concern in the documentation, representation and utilization of traditional cultural knowledge."
- Indigitization: Managing Digital Information: Created by the Indigitization collaborative, Managing Digital Information is a toolkit that works to support the collaborative's goal of "clarifying processes and identifying issues in the conservation, digitization, and management of Indigenous community knowledge"
- Ngā Upoko Tukutuku (MSH): Ngā Upoko Tukutuku was created by the Māori Subject Headings Project, with funding from Library and Information Association New Zealand Aotearoa (LIANZA), Te Rōpū Whakahau, and the National Library of New Zealand. The standard, as described by the National Library of New Zealand, "provides a structured path to a Māori world view within library and archival cataloguing and description. It supports cataloguers and descriptive archivists to assign appropriate terms for the material, and helps users find those items within a framework they relate to".
- First Nations Principles of Ownership, Control, Access, and Possession (OCAP®): First Nations Principles of Ownership, Control, Access, and Possession (OCAP®) was created in 1998 by the National Steering Committee (NSC) of the First Nations and Inuit Regional Longitudinal Health Survey. OCAP® was specifically created to express the needs of First Nations to have jurisdiction over their information. OCAP® is a registered trademark of the First Nations Information Governance Centre (FNIGC), for which more information can be found here: https://fnigc.ca/ocap-training/
- Protocols for Native American Archival Materials: The Protocols for Native American Archival Materials were created in April 2006 at the First Archivist Circle. The professionals gathered therein were inspired by The Aboriginal and Torres Strait Islander Library and Information Resource Network (ATSILIRN) Protocols. The protocols are primarily aimed towards non-tribal organizations which hold American Indian archival material, and are meant to be adapted to the needs of local communities.
- Repatriation Handbook: The Repatriation Handbook in its first iteration was written by the Indigenous Collections and Repatriation Department of the Royal BC Museum and the Haida Gwaii Museum at Kay Llnagaay. It was then reviewed by the First Peoples' Cultural Council and the Royal BC Museum Indigenous Advisory and Advocacy Committee. The Handbook supports "communities and museums that are in the beginning stages of planning for repatriation in BC and at national and international levels".
- Te Mana Raraunga - Māori Data Sovereignty Network Charter: Created by Te Mana Raraunga - Māori Data Sovereignty Network, the Te Mana Raraunga Charter supports the Networks efforts "to enable Māori Data Sovereignty and to advance Māori aspirations for collective and individual wellbeing".

== Indigenous intellectual and cultural property ==
Indigenous intellectual and cultural property rights approach the concepts of intellectual and cultural property from a non-Western view point. The intent is to protect Indigenous knowledge and works from being exploited or appropriated within other media or by cultural institutions. The proclivity to share knowledge is not equivalent to allowing this knowledge to be appropriated. For example, open-access information, including the automatic legal transference of intellectual property into the public domain, are highly valued in many fields of LIS, but it is important to recognize the role of European intellectual property laws and practices in such ideas of openness and publicity. As articulated by Indigenous scholars, including Greg Younging, these intellectual laws and their resulting concepts are often at odds with Indigenous knowledges, which can include specific protocols guiding how, when, and to whom certain knowledge should be passed. These laws also overlook the ways in which Indigenous knowledges have historically been violently extracted, appropriated, and used for profit or other gain by non-Indigenous individuals and groups before being made 'open' knowledge. Examples of works that have appropriated Indigenous works include Deep Forest.

A major effort in protecting Indigenous Intellectual and Cultural Property has been the development of the Aboriginal and Torres Strait Islander Protocols for Libraries, Archives and Information Services. These Protocols are intended to help Indigenous works be managed in a way that is culturally appropriate. The Protocols were published in 1995 by the Australian Library and Information Association (ALIA).The Protocols provide guides to libraries on ways to manage Indigenous works in their collections. These protocols also focus on providing Indigenous communities with more pathways to employment in information fields in an attempt to help reclaim sovereignty over Intellectual and Cultural Property dispersion.

The United Nations Declaration on the Rights of Indigenous Peoples (UNDRIP) was a further step in providing coverage and protections for Indigenous Intellectual and Cultural Property. UNDRIP isn't a legally binding ratification, but instead a framework that can be used to guide institutions toward giving more control to Indigenous people over their works. The Truth and Reconciliation Commission of Canada directly referenced the UNDRIP in its Calls to Action in an attempt to allow Indigenous works in archives to be more accessible to the communities in which they originated.

The rights of Indigenous peoples to hold autonomy over their knowledges are articulated within UNDRIP through the following Articles:

- Article 3: "Indigenous peoples have the right to self-determination. By virtue of that right they freely determine their political status and freely pursue their economic, social and cultural development"
- Article 5: "Indigenous peoples have the right to maintain and strengthen their distinct political, legal, economic, social and cultural institutions, while retaining their right to participate fully, if they so choose, in the political, economic, social and cultural life of the State"
- Article 11: "1. Indigenous peoples have the right to practise and revitalize their cultural traditions and customs. This includes the right to maintain, protect and develop the past, present and future manifestations of their cultures, such as archaeological and historical sites, artefacts, designs, ceremonies, technologies and visual and performing arts and literature. 2. States shall provide redress through effective mechanisms, which may include restitution, developed in conjunction with indigenous peoples, with respect to their cultural, intellectual, religious and spiritual property taken without their free, prior and informed consent or in violation of their laws, traditions and customs"

== Digital repatriation ==
Digital repatriation (or virtual repatriation) is the returning of digital copies of cultural heritage items, such as recordings, documents, and images, to the originating community. In an Indigenous context, this involves returning Indigenous cultural expressions to the relevant Indigenous community. As cultural memory institutions increasingly digitize their collections, Indigenous communities may be involved with determining descriptions for, and controlling access to, digital objects. Institutions may also repatriate collection and object rights to Indigenous communities. These materials may form a local knowledge base, requiring digital knowledge organization systems that can accommodate Indigenous cultural protocols. Such efforts at repatriation have prompted software development specifically for this purpose.

=== Canadian context ===
Library and Archives Canada (LAC) created the Indigenous Heritage Action Plan in 2019 in response to the Truth and Reconciliation Commission. The action plan affirms the rights of Indigenous peoples as laid out in UNDRIP and contains 28 concrete actions that will be undertaken by LAC. These actions include: increasing Indigenous community engagement with LAC, seeking the council of an Elder-In-Residence, following Indigenous cultural protocols, increased partnerships with Indigenous communities regarding the loaning of documents, utilizing crowdsourcing software to allow for Indigenous people to contribute knowledge to digital collections, examining Indigenous-led access management of some LAC collections, such as those created from Indigenous knowledge, and collaborating with Indigenous communities to preserve non-governmental archival records according to the preferences of the community, whether at LAC or locally.

In 2010, the Reciprocal Research Network (RRN) was launched as a partnership between the Museum of Anthropology at the University of British Columbia, the Musqueam Indian Band, the Stó:lō Nation/Tribal Council, and the U’mista Cultural Society. The RRN is an online tool that contains digital copies of Indigenous objects from the Northwest coast of British Columbia held at 29 institutions. The RRN allows for collaborative research between members and allows members to create their own projects using objects from many different holding institutions. Each co-developer has a member in the steering group, allowing them to contribute to decisions regarding the platform's scope, schedule, and budget.

== Indigenous Collection Development ==
Indigenous collection development focuses on providing culturally relevant library resources by, for, and with Indigenous people. Generally, the criteria for planning and building library collections are guided by collection development policies aimed at addressing the needs of a library's users. In Indigenous contexts collection development practices and policies aim to provide barrier free access to culturally relevant materials for the communities they serve, which can range from Indigenous community libraries to Indigenous collections within public libraries. To give some examples, the First Nations University of Canada library collection policy focuses primarily on the materials written by, for, and about the First Nations, Inuit, and Métis peoples of Canada; the Blackfoot Digital Library is dedicated to creating a Blackfoot-centric collection; the New South Wales (NSW) State Library Indigenous Collecting Strategy broadly serves to focus on "developing its collections of material created by Indigenous people, who have contributed, and continue to contribute, to the life of NSW and its communities." Additionally, Indigenous collection development may be guided by Indigenous protocols that address the specific, local needs of Indigenous communities. For example, the Australian Institute of Aboriginal and Torres Strait Islander Studies (AIATSIS) collection is guided by the AIATSIS Collection Development Policy as well as Aboriginal and Torres Strait Islander Library Information and Resource Network (ATSILIRN) Protocols for Libraries, Archives and Information Services. Though Indigenous collection development strategies are defined by the specific library contexts and communities they serve, some shared considerations emerge across diverse Indigenous collection development processes:

- Make space for the collection of materials by Indigenous authors, and "ensure that authentic Indigenous voices are represented." Indigenous histories, cultures, experiences, and voices have largely been omitted from libraries. Thus the location, selection, and acquisition of materials by and for Indigenous peoples is a key task for Indigenous collection development. In a North American context, scholar of Indigenous librarianship Loriene Roy's article, "Keeping Up: Building Your Indigenous Collection," offers practical strategies for locating Indigenous materials and staying aware of new publications by publishers and Indigenous authors.
- Appropriate handling of offensive, historically inaccurate representations of Indigenous people and culturally insensitive materials. The history of libraries is intricately tied to colonialism, and thus library collections need to be evaluated for institutionalized racism and inaccurate representations of Indigenous peoples. For example, "How to Tell the Difference: A Guide for Evaluating Children's Books for Anti-Indian Bias" offers a set of evaluation criteria to assess for negative depictions of Indigenous people through devices such as stereotypes, loaded words, and distortions of history. However, as ATSILIRN Protocol 7 states, appropriate handling of offensive materials does not mean merely censoring these materials, pretending they do not exist, but consulting with the peoples represented to deal with them sensitively and effectively.
- Develop collections that respond to the importance of oral traditions and storytelling for many Indigenous peoples. The crucial importance of storytelling in the resurgence of Indigenous many cultures challenges libraries to find relevant ways to include storytelling in their collections. For example, the Saskatchewan Aboriginal Storytelling (SAS) project, a month-long annual event in Saskatchewan, Canada, promotes First Nations, Métis & Inuit oral storytelling traditions. Organized by the Library Services for Saskatchewan Aboriginal Peoples committee, the SAS project brings Indigenous storytelling into libraries across the province and also maintains a web archive of past SAS projects. In a South African context, Maned Mhlongo makes the point that "African societies are oral societies," and therefore this must be reflected in the selection of media and formats of materials included in public library collection development strategies.
- Support Indigenous language rights through the collection of relevant, local, language specific materials. The suppression and attempted erasure of many Indigenous languages is tied to settler colonial practices of assimilation of Indigenous peoples. Through collection development, libraries can support Indigenous language revitalization. For example, the New Zealand libraries have developed specific strategies to help revitalize the te reo Ma-ori language. In a Canadian context, "Supporting Indigenous Language Revitalization: Strategies for Public Libraries" offers a guide for libraries to support Indigenous language revitalization, including collection development strategies.
- Support Indigenous health practices through library collection development. The ongoing effects of colonialism have led to poorer health conditions for many Indigenous peoples. The Indigenous Health Collection located at the University of Manitoba's Neil John Maclean Health Sciences Library was developed to support a holistic approach to Indigenous health based on First Nations, Métis, and Inuit ways of knowing. The National Collaborating Centre for Indigenous Health hosted by the University of Northern BC in British Columbia, Canada, offers an online collection of resources aimed at supporting Indigenous health renewal and health equity through knowledge translation and exchange.

=== External Links: Indigenous Collection Development Resources ===
- American Indian Library Association: Resources
- American Indians in Children's Literature Blog
- Australian Institute of Aboriginal and Torres Strait Islander Studies (AIATSIS) "Communication through effective collection management" presentation
- Australian Institute of Aboriginal and Torres Strait Islander Studies (AIATSIS): Collection Development Strategy 2017 - 2021
- Canadian Federation of Library Associations (CFLA-FCAB) Indigenous Resources and Databases
- Culturally Safe Libraries: Working with Indigenous collections - resource to provide culturally safe public spaces and services in libraries for Aboriginal and Torres Strait Islander peoples
- Indigenous Collecting: New South Wales State Library
- MacEwan University Library Indigenous Collections Policy
- Oyate: Native American Stories and Songs
- Strong Nations Publishing
- Supporting Indigenous Language Revitalization: Strategies for Public Libraries A Resource Guide for Library Boards, Administrators, and Staff
- University of British Columbia: Indigenous Librarianship - Collections Management
- University of Toronto Library Guide: Indigenous Book Club & Discover Indigenous Authors

== Indigenous librarianship publications and conferences ==
=== Edited collections and journal special issues ===
- IFLA Journal, vol. 47, no. 3: Special Issue: Indigenous Librarianship (2021)
- KULA, vol. 5, no.1: Special Issue: Indigenous Knowledges (2021)
- Information Systems Journal, vol.1, no. 2: Special Issue: Indigenous Theory (2021)
- Collection Management Journal, vol. 42, Special Issue: Sharing Knowledge and Smashing Stereotypes: Representing Native American, First Nation, and Indigenous Realities in Library Collections (2017)
- IFLA Publications, edited collection: Indigenous Notions of Ownership and Libraries, Archives and Museums (2016)

=== Recurring conferences ===
- International Conference of Indigenous Archives, Libraries, and Museums
- International Indigenous Librarian's Forum (IILF)
