= Camille Callison =

Canadian librarian and indigenous knowledges activist

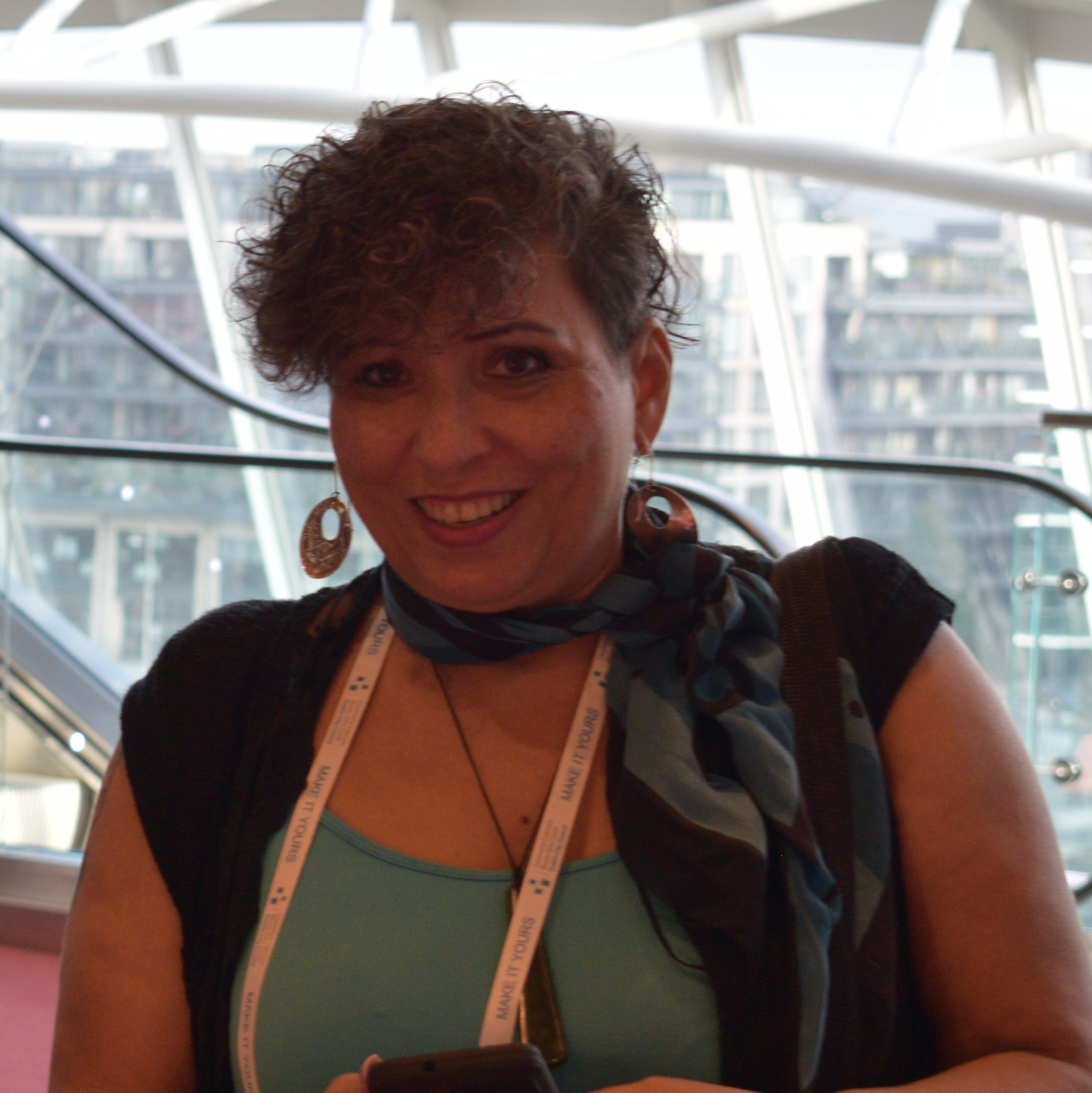
- Callison in 2022
- Born: c. 1964 (age c. 61)
- Education: University of British Columbia (MA)
- Occupation: Librarian
- Employer: University of the Fraser Valley
- Known for: Indigenous cultural activist

Camille Callison (born c. 1964) is an Indigenous librarian, archivist, academic, and cultural activist who is a member of the Tsesk iye (Crow) Clan of the Tahltan Nation in what is now known as British Columbia, Canada. She is the university librarian at the University of the Fraser Valley in Abbotsford. Callison is an advocate for the rights of Indigenous peoples and knowledge, particularly as these rights intersect with GLAM institutions. Callison is actively involved across local, national, and international professional associations related to the library and informational needs of Indigenous peoples. She previously served as co-lead of the National Indigenous Knowledge and Language Alliance (NIKLA), though she is no longer affiliated with the organization.

== Education ==
Callison earned her BA in Anthropology in 2003 and her MLIS with a First Nations Concentration in 2005, from the University of British Columbia. She was mentored by Dr. Gene Joseph, founding librarian of the Xwi7xwa Library. She is a PhD Candidate studying anthropology, with a focus on Indigenous knowledge, through the University of Manitoba.

== Career ==
=== Academic career and projects ===
Prior to her position as University Librarian at the University of the Fraser Valley, Callison worked at the University of Manitoba (2012–2021), including in positions such as the first Indigenous Services Librarian, the Indigenous Strategies Librarian, the Learning and Organizational Development Librarian, the Liaison Librarian for Native Studies, Anthropology, and Social Work, and as a member of the university's Indigenous Advisory Circle (2015-2017).

She helped to foster the Indigenous Cultural Competency Training (ICCT) program for University of Manitoba Libraries staff. She also founded the Mazinbiige Indigenous Graphic Novels Collection at the Elizabeth Defoe Library, part of University of Manitoba Libraries. Output from this project included ‘Indigenous Comics and Graphic Novels: An Annotated Bibliography’ and the downloadable ‘Mazinbiige Indigenous Graphic Novel Collection List’.

Callison was on the University of Manitoba's Bid Committee (2012) and Implementation Committee (2013–2015), which worked to bring the Truth and Reconciliation Commission of Canada archives to the University of Manitoba and to form the National Centre for Truth and Reconciliation.

In 2013, Callison served on the Association for Manitoba Archives MAIN-LCSH Working Group, which replaced culturally insensitive LCSH terms for Indigenous peoples and culture with more representative terms for use within the Manitoba Archival Information Network (MAIN) database. This work resulted in the Working Group's listing of subject headings and is visible on MAIN's website.

=== Chair, working group, and committee positions ===
==== Current positions ====
Callison serves as a Professional Division H Committee Chair for IFLA (2021–2023), on the board of directors for Canadian Research Knowledge Network (CRKN), and on the Advisory Group for the OCLC project Reimagining Descriptive Workflows. Callison is also Indigenous caucus co-lead (and was formerly the Secretary) of IEEE P2890™ Recommended Practice for Provenance of Indigenous Peoples’ Data and is a member of the Response to the Report of the Truth and Reconciliation Taskforce of the Steering Committee on Canada's Archives. She is founding co-chair of the University of Manitoba Anthropology Department Repatriation Committee, is a member of the National Information Standards Organization (NISO) Diversity, Equity, and Inclusion subcommittee.

==== Past positions ====
In 2015, Callison became a founding board member of the Canadian Federation of Library Associations (CFLA-FCAB), which replaced the Canadian Library Association in 2016. She has held positions as the Indigenous Representative to the Board (2015-2019), vice-chair to the Board (2018–2019), and member of the CFLA-FCAB's Copyright Committee (2017–2020). Within her role on the Copyright Committee, Callison worked on the Position Statement on Indigenous Knowledge. She also independently presented to the Canadian House of Commons Standing Committee on Industry, Science and Technology as they reviewed The Copyright Act.

Callison's tenure with the CFLA-FCAB included her position as Chair of the CFLA-FCAB Truth and Reconciliation Committee in 2017. In this capacity, Callison oversaw the creation of the ‘Truth and Reconciliation Report and Recommendations’, after which she served as founding Chair (2017–2019) and Past Chair (2019-2020) of the CFLA-FCAB's Indigenous Matters Committee. Alongside her work as the Committee Chair, she co-chaired working groups on Indigenous Knowledge Protection/Copyright, Indigenous Knowledge and Curriculum, and the Joint Working Group on Classification and Subject Headings. As chair, she also helped to oversee projects such as the CFLA-FCAB's ongoing partnership with the ‘Indigenous Canada’ MOOC developed by the University of Alberta’s Faculty of Native Studies.

Callison's other past positions include President of the Manitoba Library Association (2013-2015), member of the National Film Board of Canada’s Indigenous Advisory Group, Vice-Chair of the Canadian Advisory Committee, Commission for UNESCO Memory of the World Committee (2017-2019), and Chair of the Indigenous Matters Section of IFLA (2017-2021) and co-lead of the National Indigenous Knowledges and Languages Association, of which she was also the founder.

=== Public outreach ===
Callison engages in public outreach facilitating intergenerational and intercultural knowledge exchange. She has been an invited keynote or speaker several events, including: the OLA Super Conference 2021, the Atlantic Provinces Library Association 2021 Conference, the Archive/Counterarchive Summer Institute 2021 Public Talks, the 2020 American Indian Library Association President’s Program, the 2019 Designing the Archives 2019 conference, the 2019 Association of Tribal Archives, Libraries, and Museums conference, the 2019 Dalhousie-Horrocks National Leadership Lecture, and the 2015 Association of Tribal Archives, Libraries, and Museums Archives Summit. She has also been a guest on Western University’s ‘So What? Library and Information Science Podcast’ for their ‘CFLA-FCAB Truth and Reconciliation Efforts’ episode, she has served as a guest editor for the IFLA Journal October 2021 special issue on ‘Indigenous Matters in Libraries’, and she was a 2019 University of British Columbia Okanagan Library Leader in Residence.

== Works ==
- Callison, Camille, and Ford, Lyle. 2022. An Introductory Indigenous Cultural Competency Training Program in the Academic Environment. In Implementing Excellence in Diversity, Equity, and Inclusion: A Handbook for Academic Libraries (Corliss Lee and Brian Lym). ALA: 363–382. http://hdl.handle.net/1993/36300
- Steering Committee on Canada's Archives. 2022. Reconciliation Framework: The Response to the Report of the Truth and Reconciliation Commission Taskforce. https://archives2026.files.wordpress.com/2022/02/reconciliationframeworkreport_en.pdf
- Callison, Camille; Ann Ludbrook; Victoria Owen; and Kim Nayyer. 2021. "Engaging Respectfully With Indigenous Knowledges: Copyright, Customary Law, and Cultural Memory Institutions in Canada". KULA: Knowledge Creation, Dissemination, and Preservation Studies 5 (1). https://doi.org/10.18357/kula.146
- Daigneault, Taylor; Mazowita, Amy; Rifkind, Candida; Callison, Camille. 2019. "Indigenous Comics and Graphic Novels: An Annotated Bibliography". Jeunesse: Young People, Texts, Cultures. 11(1). I–xxxvi. https://jeunessejournal.ca/index.php/yptc/article/view/504
- Callison, Camille; Rifkind, Candida; Sinclair, Niigaan James; Ballantyne, Sonya, Odijick, Jay; Daigneault, Taylor; Mazowita, Amy. 2019. “Introduction: Indigenous Comics and Graphic Novels: An Annotated Bibliography”. Jeunesse: Young People, Texts, and Cultures. 11(1). 139–155. https://jeunessejournal.ca/index.php/yptc/article/view/495
- Callison, Camille. 2018. “A Brief History and Update from the CFLA-FCAB on Indigenous Matters”. BCLA Perspectives. 10(1). https://bclaconnect.ca/perspectives/2018/02/26/a-brief-history-and-update-from-the-cfla-fcab-on-indigenous-matters/
- Callison, Camille. 2017. Truth and Reconciliation Report and Recommendations. CFLA-FCAB. https://cfla-fcab.ca/en/indigenous/trc_report/
- Callison, Camille; Roy, Loriene; and LeCheminant, Gretchen Alice (eds.). 2016. Indigenous Notions of Ownership and Libraries, Archives and Museums. Berlin: IFLA Publications, de Gruyter. https://www.ifla.org/publications/ifla-publications-series-166
- Lougheed, Brett; Moran, Ry; Callison, Camille. 2015. "Reconciliation through Description: Using Metadata to Realize the Vision of the National Research Center for Truth and Reconciliation". Cataloging & Classification Quarterly. 53(5–6): 596–614. https://www.tandfonline.com/doi/abs/10.1080/01639374.2015.1008718?journalCode=wccq20
- Callison, Camille. "Indigenous People’s New Canoe". 2014. In Aboriginal and Visible Minority Librarians: Oral Histories from Canada (Lee, Deborah & Kumaran, Mahalakshmi, eds.). Lanham: Rowman & Littlefield, 135–146.
