= A. Brian Deer =

Canadian librarian

- Tionerahtoken
- Born: Alec Brian Deer; January 10, 1945; Brooklyn, New York
- Died: January 12, 2019 (aged 74); Montreal, Quebec, Canada
- Education: John Grant High School (1962), Concordia University (BSci, Math, 1966); McGill (MLS, 1974)
- Occupations: Librarian; Scholar; Entrepreneur (Otiohkwa Video)
- Known for: Brian Deer Classification System

Alec Brian Deer (1945 – January 12, 2019), Tionerahtoken (Mohawk), known as Brian Deer, was a librarian from Kahnawake known for the development of a high-level, original library classification system that expresses Indigenous knowledge structures. He developed it while working in the late 1970s for the National Indian Brotherhood (now the Assembly of First Nations) in Canada. He also applied the principles to other small collections, while creating new classifications. After further development, the system was revised and has been adapted for wider use, known as the Brian Deer Classification System (BDCS).

This classification system was extended and adapted for use by Deer and others for other libraries in Canada. In the early 1980s, a version was developed for use in British Columbia, known as BDC-BC. It has since been revised and used for the Xwi7xwa Library, established as an indigenous library at the Vancouver campus of the University of British Columbia.

Born with pneumonia and suffering from lung problems when young, Deer worked hard to build his physical strength. He long outlived doctors' expectations. He died at the age of 74 on January 12, 2019, at the Royal-Victoria hospital in Montreal.

== Early life, education and marriage ==
Alec Brian Deer, known as Brian, was born in 1945 in Brooklyn, New York, as the third child of four to Norah Johnson and Alec Deering (both Mohawk). A snowstorm had closed down the city and his parents had to walk to the hospital for his birth. Deer was born with pneumonia and suffered from lung problems as a child, undergoing surgery to remove part of his lungs. As a youth he set about building his physical strength to compensate.

His father had added "ing" to his surname because there were so many by the surname 'Deer' in their native community of Kahnawake in Quebec, Canada. The family returned there when Deer was young. Deer graduated from John Grant High School in 1962. (He later changed his surname back to the traditional form.)

Deer obtained a Bachelor of Science in Mathematics in 1966 from Sir George Williams University (now Concordia University). He also got a teaching certificate and taught for a time at a high school in Kahnawake, but decided to pursue another field. Deer studied for a Master of Library Science at McGill University, which he completed in 1974.

In the 1970s he married Peggy Margaret Pyke. They separated in the 1980s without having had children. Deer did not remarry.

== Librarian career ==
After completing his master's, Deer was hired in 1974 by the National Indian Brotherhood (NIB) (now the Assembly of First Nations) in Ottawa; he was one of the first Indigenous librarians in Canada. Finding the system of classification in use problematic (that of the Library of Congress and Dewey System), he began rethinking how to organize indigenous materials in their own context. He created a new system from about 1974-1976 that expressed associations and relationships integral to the culture.

Deer next worked at the library of the Union of British Columbia Indian Chiefs, where he adapted his system to classify its holdings. He designed his work for flexibility to reflect local communities and their small, specialized collections. He created a new system for each one. This was a high-level system; it was not classification for subject headings.

Deer returned to Kahnawake where he worked on classifying and organizing materials at its Cultural Centre and at the Mohawk Nation Office.

== Wider career ==
He was also an active independent scholar, elder, teacher and community member. He wrote on issues related to Indigenous knowledge and culture, and taught related courses at Concordia University. He also ran a video store at Kahnawake.

== Later years ==
After increasing health problems because of his lungs, Deer died in 2019. His sister Ann Penny Leclair predeceased him in 2014. He was survived by sister Sandra Richardson, who is married and lives in Winnipeg; and younger brother Philip Deering, married to Willma and living in Kahnawake. He also was close to his many nieces and nephews.

== Influence and legacy ==
Deer's work on classification has been the subject of studies since the late 20th century. It was a high-level system, not a subject headings system.

Other scholars adapted and revised his work. For instance, Keltie McCall and Gene Joseph, also working for the Union of BC Indian Chiefs Library, revised the Brian Deer Classification System for local use. They produced what is known as the BDC-BC System.

When working later for the University of British Columbia, Vancouver, Joseph adapted the BDC-BC from 1984-1986 to classify the collection of the Indigenous Teacher Education Program (NITEP) there. The indigenous Xwi7xwa Library at UBC was developed from this collection. In the 21st century, it uses its own version of the BDC-BC system to classify these materials. The Xwi7xwa Library holds 15,000 items and has integrated its subject heading system with the main university library.

Deer's work has had increasingly wide influence in the early 21st century on the practice of librarianship and on the theory of knowledge organization, especially as it relates to Indigenous peoples.

In 2014 the Union of British Columbia Indian Chiefs Resource Centre released a new revision of the BDC-BC System. It included a model and tools to make it easier for other institutions to implement. Efforts to decolonize collections, reflect indigenous culture, and create subject headings that reflect less bias continue. The Aanischaaukamikw Cree Culture Institute in Oujé-Bougoumou, Quebec also uses an updated version of the BDC system.
