= Rose Charlie =

Stsʼailes chief

Rose Charlie OBC

President of the Indian Homemakers' Association of British Columbia
- In office 1969–1997

Personal details
- Born: May 9, 1930 Chehalis, British Columbia
- Died: March 4, 2018 (aged 87)

Elizabeth Rose Charlie (May 9, 1930 – March 4, 2018) was a Sts'Ailes chief and Indigenous leader.

== Early life ==
Elizabeth Rose Charlie was born on the Chehalis reserve but moved with her family to Bainbridge Island in Washington state when she was 11 years old. In 1949, she married a man from Chehalis and moved back to the reserve.

== Career ==
Charlie became a member of the first Indian Homemakers Club in BC started in 1950 in Chehalis, and she later served as president of the Vancouver chapter. Although these clubs began, officially, as a home-cooking and sewing clubs, some grew increasingly political and vocal. After the small amount of government funding was cut off, Charlie helped merge the many existing Homemakers Clubs into a large Indian Homemakers' Association (IHA) of British Columbia in May 1969. She became the organization's first president, and continued in that role for 28 years. The IHA also established the monthly newsletter, "Indigenous Voice," which became one of the few prominent media sources of Indigenous peoples in British Columbia. The strength of the IHA allowed Charlie to contribute to the foundation of both the National Indian Brotherhood (now the Assembly of First Nations) and the B.C. Association of Non-Status Indians in 1968.

In opposition to the 1969 White Paper, Charlie and the IHA organized two "moccasin walks", culminating in a large gathering of chiefs, which helped lead to the foundation of the Union of BC Indian Chiefs in November 1969. Charlie became a member of the Union's executive council and was later named a Grand Chief.

Charlie later helped establish the National Association of Indian Rights for Indian Women in 1977 and the Native Women's Association of Canada.

Charlie worked for decades to remove section 12(1)(b) of the Indian Act, which stripped women of their Indian Status if they married non-status men. Her work, with other women activists like Mary Two-Axe Early, led to Bill C-31, which amended the Indian act in June 1985.

== Death ==
Charlie died on March 4, 2018, at the age of 87.

== Recognition ==
In 1989, Charlie was awarded an honorary doctorate from the University of British Columbia. In 1994, she was the recipient of the Governor General's Award in Commemoration of the Persons Case. In 2003, she was named to the Order of British Columbia. In 2013, she was awarded a Queen Elizabeth II Diamond Jubilee Medal.
