= James Turk =

James Turk may refer to:

- James Clinton Turk (1923–2014), Virginia lawyer, judge and state senator
- James L. Turk, Canadian academic and labour leader
