= James L. Turk =

Canadian academic and public intellectual

James Leonard Turk is a Canadian academic and Director of the Centre for Free Expression at Toronto Metropolitan University. He is a frequent media commentator and public speaker on freedom of expression, intellectual freedom, post-secondary education, academic freedom, whistleblowing, and other public policy issues related to expressive freedom, social justice, and democracy.

== Education and career ==
Turk received his Bachelor of Arts (magna cum laude) from Harvard University, studied political science and philosophy as a Knox Fellow at the University of Cambridge, received his Master of Arts from the University of California, Berkeley and his doctor of philosophy from the University of Toronto. He was married to the late Lynne Diane Browne and has three children and five grandchildren.

Turk taught in the Department of Sociology at the University of Toronto, specializing in Canadian Studies and Labour Studies. He left his position as a tenured associate professor to become research director for the United Electrical Workers Union of Canada. He served as director of education for the Ontario Federation of Labour and executive assistant to the national president of the Canadian Union of Public Employees before being selected to be the Executive Director of the Canadian Association of University Teachers—a position he held from 1998 to 2014. From 1990 to 1998, he chaired the Ontario Coalition for Social Justice and was a lead organizer of the Ontario's Days of Action. Turk served for 20 years as a member of the Board of the Canadian Centre for Policy Alternatives, former secretary of the Harry Crowe Foundation, and as adjunct research professor at the Institute of Political Economy at Carleton University. Previously he served as president of the Ontario New Democratic Party. Currently, he is a member of the Steering Committee of the International Civil Liberties Monitoring Group.

== Books ==
- Academic Freedom in Conflict: The Struggle over Speech Rights in the University. (2014)
- Love, Hope, Optimism: An Informal Portrait of Jack Layton by Those Who Knew Him. (2012) Co-edited with Charis Wahl.
- Universities at Risk: How Politics, Special Interests and Corporatization Threaten the Integrity of the University. (2008)
- Free Speech in Fearful Times: After 9/11 in Canada, the U.S., Australia and Europe. Co-edited with Allan Manson.
- Disciplining Dissent: The Curbing of Free Expression in Academia and the Media. (2005). Co-edited with William Bruneau.
- The Corporate Campus: Commercialization and the Dangers to Canada's Universities and Colleges. (2000).
- It's Our Own Knowledge: Labour, Public Education & Skills Training. (1989).

== Awards ==
- In 2024, Turk received the Canadian Federation of Library Associations Intellectual Freedom Award
- in 2019, Turk received the Les Fowlie Award for Intellectual Freedom from the Ontario Library Association
- In 2018, Turk received the Milner Memorial Award from the Canadian Association of University Teachers for distinguished contribution to the cause of academic freedom.
- In May 2014, Turk received the Peter C. Dooley Legacy Award from the University of Saskatchewan Faculty Association
- In September 2013, Turk received the Jay Newman award for academic integrity.
- In 2012, Turk was presented the Distinguished Member Award from the Canadian Society for the Study of Higher Education (CSSHE) for having made distinguished contributions to the study of higher education.
