= Canadian Federation of Library Associations =

Canadian library advocacy organization

CFLA-FCAB
- Canadian Federation of Library Associations/Fédération canadienne des associations de bibliothèques
- Established: May 16, 2016; 10 years ago
- Type: Nonprofit
- Chair: Lorisia MacLeod
- Vice Chair: Hélène Carrier
- Website: cfla-fcab.ca/en/home-page/

The Canadian Federation of Library Associations / Fédération canadienne des associations de bibliothèques (CFLA-FCAB) is a non-profit federation of Canada’s library associations. It was incorporated on 16 May 2016 and replaced the Canadian Library Association (CLA).

The CFLA-FCAB’s stated mission is to be “the united voice of Canada’s libraries” and its stated vision is to influence public policy and advance the success of libraries. Membership is open to associations, groups or corporations that further the interests of the Canadian library community and entails an annual membership fee. The CFLA-FCAB's stated strategic priorities are to amplify the influence and impact of libraries in national and international public policy; anticipate and respond to the changing information environment by defining national policy positions to advance library excellence; raise the visibility of libraries as contributors to Canadian intellectual, social, and cultural life; and develop a sustainable organization to effectively support CFLA-FCAB’s mission and vision.

CFLA-FCAB’s work is carried out through committees, public-facing position statements, and the creation of resources and reports, including the CFLA-FCAB Truth and Reconciliation Report and Recommendations. CFLA-FCAB also contributes and makes available its responses to federal government consultation requests, including on Canadian Content in a Digital World and the Canadian accessibility legislation.

== History ==
The CFLA-FCAB was preceded by the Canadian Library Association (CLA), which had struggled to maintain financial stability and membership in the complex twenty-first century library sector, despite its 68-year history. The CFLA-FCAB was created in response to the need for stronger national representation across the diverse range of Canadian libraries, including academic, public, school, and special libraries.

In January 2015, the CLA’s Executive Council began formal discussions to address the sustainability challenges it was facing. On December 18, 2015, the Future Federation Working Group released a proposal to dissolve the CLA and form “a new federation that unites, supports, and represents the diverse library communities that make up [Canada's] library ecosystem”. The model was conceived of as an ‘association of associations’ and was inspired by the International Federation of Library Associations and Institutions (IFLA).

In January 2016, at a Special Meeting of the membership, members voted to dissolve the CLA and to create the CFLA-FCAB. The new Federation was formally incorporated on 16 May 2016. The inaugural CFAB-FCAB Annual General Meeting was held on 1 February 2017 in Toronto, Ontario. The inaugural CFLA-FCAB National Forum was held on 2 May 2018 in Regina, Saskatchewan and focused on topics of Artificial Intelligence and intellectual freedom. CFLA-FCAB is a current member of IFLA.

== List of member associations ==
- AMPLO - Administrators of Medium-Sized Public Libraries of Ontario
- ABPQ - Association des Bibliothèques Publiques du Québec
- ABQLA - L’Association de Bibliothécaires du Québec / Quebec Library Association
- APLA - The Atlantic Provinces Library Association
- Association of British Columbia Public Library Directors
- BCLA - British Columbia Library Association
- BCLTA - British Columbia Library Trustees Association
- CALL / ACBD - Canadian Association of Law Libraries / Association Canadienne des Bibliothèques de Droit
- CAPAL / ACBAP - The Canadian Association of Professional Academic Librarians / L’Association Canadienne des Bibliothécaires en Enseignement Supérieur
- CARL / ABRC - Canadian Association of Research Libraries / Association des Bibliothèques de Recherche du Canada
- CCA - Canadian Council of Archives / Conseil canadien des archives
- CHLA / ABSC - Canadian Health Libraries Association / Association des bibliothèques de la santé du Canada
- CSL - Canadian School Libraries
- CULC / CBUC - Canadian Urban Libraries Council / Conseil des Bibliothèques Urbaines du Canada
- ELA - Ex Libris Association
- FOPL - Federation of Ontario Public Libraries / La Fédération du Bibliothèques Publiques de l’Ontario
- LAA - Library Association of Alberta
- MLA - Manitoba Library Association
- Nunavut Library Association
- NLLA - Newfoundland and Labrador Library Association
- NSLA - Nova Scotia Library Association
- NWTLA - Northwest Territories Library Association
- OLA - Ontario Library Association
- SLA - Saskatchewan Library Association
- Yukon Library Association

== Truth and Reconciliation Committee ==
The Truth and Reconciliation Committee (T&R Committee) was mandated from 30 September 2016 - 1 February 2017. Before the dissolution of the CLA in 2016, this body prioritized the need to advance the 94 Calls to Action that were issued in 2015 by the Truth & Reconciliation Commission of Canada. In keeping with this prioritization, the first committee to be created under the new CFLA-FCAB was the T&R Committee. Chaired by Camille Callison (founding CFLA-FCAB member and Indigenous Representative, 2015-2019), the T&R Committee delineated ways that libraries, archives, and cultural memory institutions can support the Calls to Action and can become more welcoming to, inclusive of, and respectful towards Indigenous peoples and communities. The Committee also consulted with Indigenous Elders, including Norman Meade and Marlene Kayseas.

=== Teams ===
Guided by Elder Norman Meade, Callison used the model of the medicine wheel to organize the T&R Committee and the focused teams within it. The T&R Committee teams were formed as follows:

- Black Team: tasked with compiling best practices already in place across libraries and Indigenous communities;
- White Team: provided a gap analysis on the 94 Calls to Action;
- Yellow Team: focused on existing relationships, including the development of a living contact database
- Red Team: focused on strategies for the future, including through recommendations regarding access, classification, Indigenous knowledge protection, decolonization of library spaces, and outreach and service.

=== Outputs ===
The T&R Committee created the CFLA-FCAB Truth and Reconciliation Committee Report and Recommendations, which were released publicly on 20 April 2017 and include recommendations for long-term actions that the CFLA-FCAB, its members, and cultural heritage institutions more broadly can undertake to support Indigenous peoples living in what is now known as Canada. The Report was presented at the CFLA-FCAB 2017 Annual General Meeting in the presence of the International Indigenous Librarians’ Forum Mauri Stone.

The report consolidates the recommendations from each of the four teams to offer 10 overarching recommendations:

1. creation of a "Standing Committee on Indigenous Matters utilizing the medicine wheel framework developed by the Truth & Reconciliation Committee" within CFLA-FCAB
2. endorsement for the CFLA-FCAB Position Statement on Library and Literacy Services for Indigenous (First Nations, Métis and Inuit) Peoples of Canada
3. "encourage libraries, archives and cultural memory institutions to implement the Truth and Reconciliation Commission of Canada 94 Calls to Action, several of which have been identified as having a direct impact on libraries and archives and are prioritized in this report, and to implement a status report on a yearly basis to monitor their implementation"
4. ensure accessibility of material produced and programming planned, including with the support of CELA (the Center for Equitable Library Access) and NNELS (the National Network for Equitable Library Service)
5. "decolonize Access and Classification by addressing the structural biases in existing schemes of knowledge organization and information retrieval arising from colonialism by committing to integrating Indigenous epistemologies into cataloguing praxis and knowledge management"
6. "decolonize Libraries and Space by recognizing and supporting Indigenous cultures, languages and knowledges through culturally appropriate space planning, interior design, signage, art installations, territorial acknowledgements of geographic-specific traditional territories and public programming in collaboration with local Indigenous stakeholders"
7. "enhance opportunities for Indigenous library, archival and information professionals as well as the inclusion of Indigenous epistemologies in the Canadian library and archives profession through culturally appropriate pedagogy, recruitment practices, professional and continuing education and cross-cultural training in collaboration with local Indigenous stakeholders and partners"
8. "recommend the implementation of Indigenous Knowledge Protection protocols and agreements with local and other Indigenous groups who have holdings in libraries, archives and/or cultural memory institutions to respect the Indigenous cultural concept of copyright with regard to Indigenous history or heritage, which is often located in but not limited to oral traditions, songs, dance, storytelling, anecdotes, place names, hereditary names and other forms of Indigenous knowledge; recommend that CFLA-FCAB actively participate in reforming the Canadian Copyright Act to include protection of Indigenous knowledge and languages while advocating for changes to include traditional knowledge as outlined and recommended by the World Intellectual Property Organization (WIPO) – Intergovernmental Committee on Intellectual Property and Genetic Resources, Traditional Knowledge and Folklore. We join the Truth and Reconciliation Commission (TRC) in calling upon Library and Archives Canada to implement the Truth and Reconciliation Commission Calls to Action #69 (Appendix D) by fully implementing the United Nations Declaration on the Rights of Indigenous Peoples (UNDRIP) and the Updated Set of Principles for the Protection and Promotion of Human Rights through Action to Combat Impunity (2005), more commonly known as the Joinet/Orentlicher Principles"
9. "establish an online database of 'living documents' to highlight existing Best Practices of Indigenous Services in libraries, archives, and cultural memory institutions that will serve as a foundation to help disseminate those best practices" with at least semi-annual updates
10. "maintain a database of Indigenous organizations or groups committed to preserving cultural memory primarily, but not limited to, libraries, archives, language preservation, cultural history/museums to build relationships; to support the development of an Indigenous association of library, archives and cultural memory institutions; and to support in principle the National Aboriginal Library Association (NALA) regarding their stated intent of developing First Nations public libraries on reserves."

In 2017, the CFLA-FCAB implemented the first call of the Report by creating the Indigenous Matters Committee, which now carries on the work started by the T&R Committee. Among other of its outputs, the T&R Committee started collaborations with the University of Alberta that led to the launch of the Indigenous Canada MOOC.

== Professional committees ==
=== Cataloguing and Metadata Standards Committee ===
The CFLA-FCAB Cataloguing and Metadata Standards Committee (CMSC/CNSM) held its inaugural meeting on 1 September 2017. This Committee is mandated to undertake advocacy and provide advice regarding issues of cataloguing and metadata standards. This Committee also oversees CFLA-FCAB’s representation on the Canadian Committee on Cataloguing (CCC) and on the Canadian Committee on Metadata Exchange (CCM). The CMSC/CNSM meets twice annually.

==== Canadian BIBFRAME Readiness Task Force ====
From 2018-2020, the CMSC/CNSM began a partnership with the Fédération des milieux documentaires (FMD), Library and Archives Canada - Bibliothèque et Archives Canada (LAC-BAC), and the Library of Parliament in order to prepare documents that could be used by CMSC/CNSM in response to the Library of Congress’s planned migration from MARC standards to the Bibliographic Framework (BIBFRAME) schema. The task force is called the Canadian BIBFRAME Readiness Task Force and its outputs include ‘A plain-language description of BIBFRAME and its potential impact on Canadian libraries’ report and the Task Force’s ‘Final Report’ in 2020 which includes a list of recommendations, including that BIBFRAME be included in ALA-accredited library school programs and that readiness surveys be conducted nationally before 2025.

=== Copyright Committee ===
The Copyright Committee was formed in December 2016 and is mandated to advise the CFLA-FCAB on matters of copyright and policy advocacy. The Committee also engages in collaboration and outreach with CFLA-FCAB members and the broader cultural heritage community both in Canada and internationally. The Copyright Committee meets monthly from June to September and reports to the CFLA-FCAB Board. The CFLA-FCAB website also includes a page that collects statements and resources related to copyright, including CFLA-FCAB’s position statements regarding ‘Indigenous Knowledge in Canada’s Copyright Act’ and ‘Fair Dealing’ in Canada’s Copyright Act.

=== Indigenous Matters Committee ===
The Indigenous Matters Committee was formed in 2017 following the work of the CFLA-FCAB’s Truth and Reconciliation Committee (T&R Committee). Camille Callison served as founding Chair (2017-2019).

The Indigenous Matters Committee exists to ensure an ongoing commitment within the CFLA-FCAB to respond to the Truth and Reconciliation Commission of Canada’s Calls to Action and to the T&R Committee’s 10 recommendations. The Indigenous Matters Committee works to promote collaborations among and between its members and other Canadian libraries, archives, and cultural memory institutions to implement these calls to action and makes annual progress reports to the CFLA-FCAB Board. In line with the T&R Committee’s recommendations, the Indigenous Matters Committee has also created an Indigenous Resources Hub on the CFLA-FCAB website.

==== Teams ====
The Indigenous Matters Committee continues the T&R Committee’s use of the medicine wheel as a guiding structure and framework. Working groups for the Indigenous Matters Committee are divided into four teams:

- Black Team: includes oversight of the Best Practices Database and tool kits;
- Yellow Team: includes oversight of the Contacts Database and work with the National Indigenous Association;
- White Team: includes gap analysis for Calls to Action and continuing work with Indigenous MOOCs;
- Red Team: includes work with Indigenous knowledge protection, copyright, subject headings, and classification.

=== Intellectual Freedom Committee and Challenges Survey ===
Prior to 2016, the CLA conducted a survey known as the Annual Challenges Survey. When the CLA was dissolved, the CFLA-FCAB took over the administration of this survey, which is now known as the Intellectual Freedom Challenges Survey of Canadian Libraries. The survey is overseen by the CFLA-FCAB’s Intellectual Freedom Committee. The survey provides an annual list of reported challenges regarding library collections and policies across Canada and the survey results are published annually through the CFLA-FCAB website.

== Programs ==
=== Accreditation ===
The CFLA-FCAB approaches and supports qualified librarians to serve on American Library Association (ALA) review boards to assess Canadian library and information schools on an as-needed basis.

=== Canada Library Month and Canadian Library Workers’ Day ===
The CFLA-FCAB promotes and supports Canada Library Month in October, as well as Canadian Library Workers’ Day on the third Friday in October.

This program was initially launched in 2006 by the CLA and is carried forward by the CFLA-FCAB, which announces an annual theme and provides promotional materials and resources for libraries in support of these events.

=== W. Kaye Lamb Award for Service to Seniors ===
The CFLA-FCAB partners with the Ex-Libris Association to offer the W. Kaye Lamb Award for Service to Seniors. Launched in 2002, the award can be granted to libraries of any type that provide innovative and excellent service to senior patrons and it is offered every two years (although only awarded when merited). The award includes a $500 cash prize. Past recipients are:

- Vancouver Public Library (2021);
- Hamilton Public Library (2017);
- Ajax Public Library (2015);
- Coquitlam Public Library (2012);
- Oshawa Public Libraries (2008);
- Maple Ridge Public Library (part of Fraser Valley Regional Libraries) (2006);
- Toronto Public Libraries (2004);
- Western Counties Regional Library and Calgary Public Library (joint winners 2002).

== Leadership ==
The CFLA-FCLA current Board of Directors are listed below.

Current CFLA-FCLA Board of Directors
Name	Position	Years
Lorisia MacLeod	Chair and Indigenous Ancestry Representative	2023-2025
Jessica Knoch	Vice Chair and Alberta Representative	2022-2024
Andrea Cecchetto	Treasurer and Ontario Representative	2022-2024
Ann Smith	Secretary and Atlantic Canada Representative	2023-2025
Brett Waytuck	Canadian Association of Research Libraries Representative	2022-2024
Mary Chevreau	CULC Representative	2022-2024
Mélanie Raymond	Francophone Representative	2023-2025
Denis Chouinard	Quebec Representative	2023-2025
Vacant	Northern Territories Representative	2023-2025
Tracey Therrien	British Columbia Representative	2023-2025
Brad Doerksen	Prairie Provinces Representative (Saskatchewan and Manitoba)	2022-2024

== See also ==
- List of library associations
