= Nova Scotia Library Association =

Professional association in Canada

The Nova Scotia Library Association (NSLA) is a professional association for those involved in libraries and information science at all levels within Nova Scotia. The purpose of the NSLA is to promote discussion and information sharing among people concerned with library and information services. It publishes a thrice yearly newsletter, and together with the Association of Nova Scotia Museums, and the Council of Nova Scotia Archives, it holds the Libraries, Archives & Museums Nova Scotia Conference.

== History ==
NSLA was officially formed on 5 April 1974. In 1973, the staff at Western Counties Regional Library formed a "Committee for a Nova Scotia Library Association." This committee would meet with other interested parties at Halifax County Regional Library (which would later become Halifax Public Libraries), who agreed that an association was necessary, particularly to meet the needs of non-professional staff.

In 1993, the NSLA called for an end to a publication ban on details of the trial of Karla Teale. The association expressed disappointment in censorship of American newspapers covering the trial.
