= Hamilton Public Library =

Public library system in Hamilton, Ontario, Canada

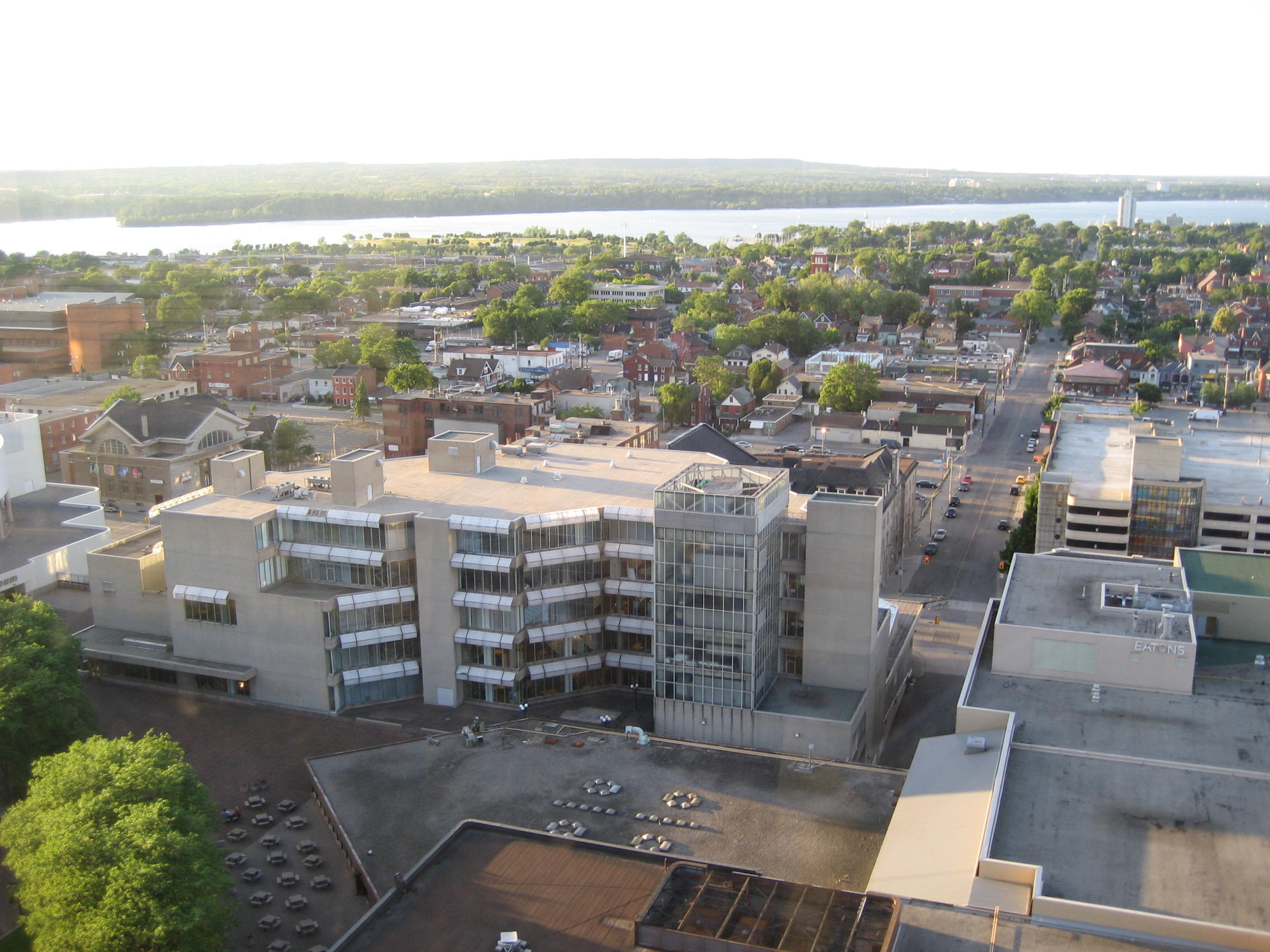
- Hamilton Public Library, view from top of Stelco Tower
- 43.259160609618206°N 79.8704048290868°W
- Location: 55 York Blvd, Hamilton, ON L8N 4E4, Canada
- Type: Public library system

Other information
- Website: hpl.ca

The Hamilton Public Library (HPL) is the municipal public library system of the city of Hamilton in Ontario, Canada.

== Services ==
HPL services include the Local History and Archives department (formerly called Special Collections), which houses an extensive collection of local history resources and government documents from the City of Hamilton, and the Learning Centre, which provides access to language materials for new Canadians. In recent years, the HPL's collection of online resources has expanded rapidly, and now features more than 30 databases covering a great variety of topic areas.

- Information and reference services
- Access to full text databases
- Community information
- Internet access
- Reader's advisory services
- Programs for children, youth and adults
- Delivery to homebound individuals
- Interlibrary loan
- Free downloadable ebooks and eaudiobooks
- Multi-purpose rooms including the Hamilton Room at Central Library
- Free musical concerts and dance performances
- Six art galleries across the systems that exhibit local artists, artisans, archival displays and organizations

== History ==
Public libraries have operated in Hamilton since the 1830s, although the first branches were privately operated and tended to be ephemeral in nature. Hamilton and Gore Mechanics' Institute was one of a series of mechanic's institutes that were set up internationally after becoming popular in Britain. These mechanic's institutes eventually became public libraries after the establishment of free libraries occurred.

Hamilton city council voted to publicly fund the construction and operation of a library in 1889. This building opened in February 1890. Hamilton was the first city in Canada to erect a new building for the express purpose of housing a library. A HPL branch opened on Hamilton's Barton Street in 1908. Andrew Carnegie funded a new main library, which opened in 1913. This was in turn replaced by a new, six-storey central library in 1980. Today, only one half of the building houses public collections. Once restricted to the city of Hamilton, the HPL service area was expanded when the outlying townships were amalgamated into the City in 2001. The now-amalgamated City of Dundas had had its own library in operation since 1822. The outlying rural towns had previously been served by the Wentworth Libraries system. In 2001, the Wentworth and Dundas libraries amalgamated with the HPL into a single system with 22 branches, 34 bookmobile stops, a virtual online branch and a Visiting Library Service for the homebound.

In 2014, cardholders of the Hamilton Public Library checked out an average of 41.82 items, which was the highest ratio for a library system in Ontario that year. In 2020, the library system temporarily waived late fees and made this change permanent in 2021. Visitors to the central branch located in downtown Hamilton have to display a card in order to enter due to drug use in the surrounding area.

== List of branches ==
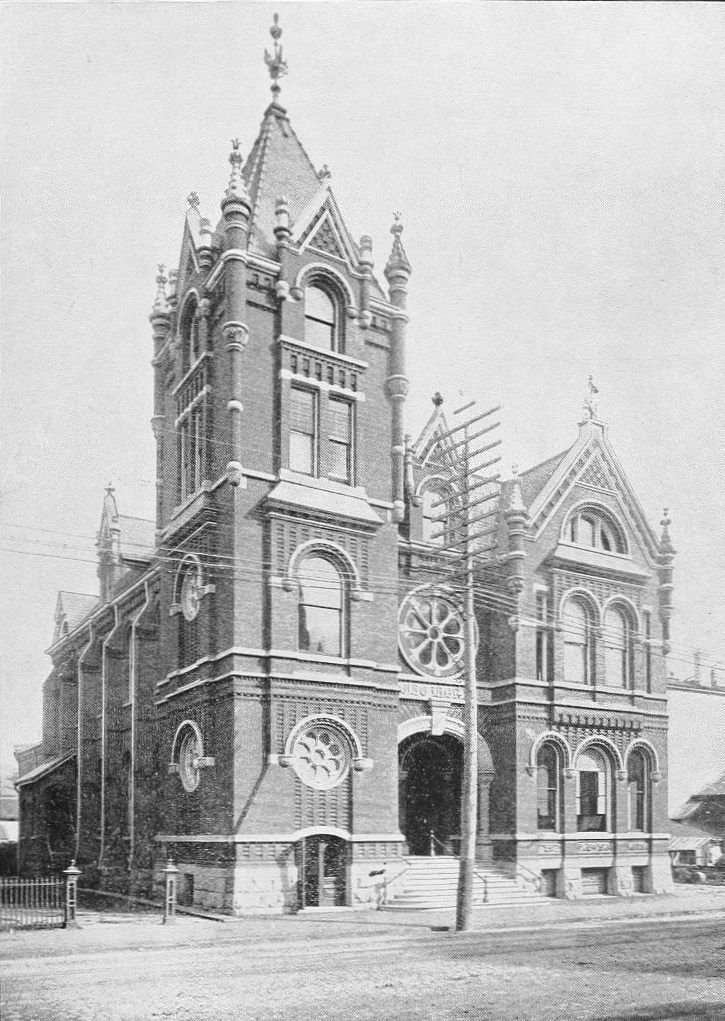
The first branch of the HPL, designed by William Stewart, opened in 1890. It was demolished in 1955.

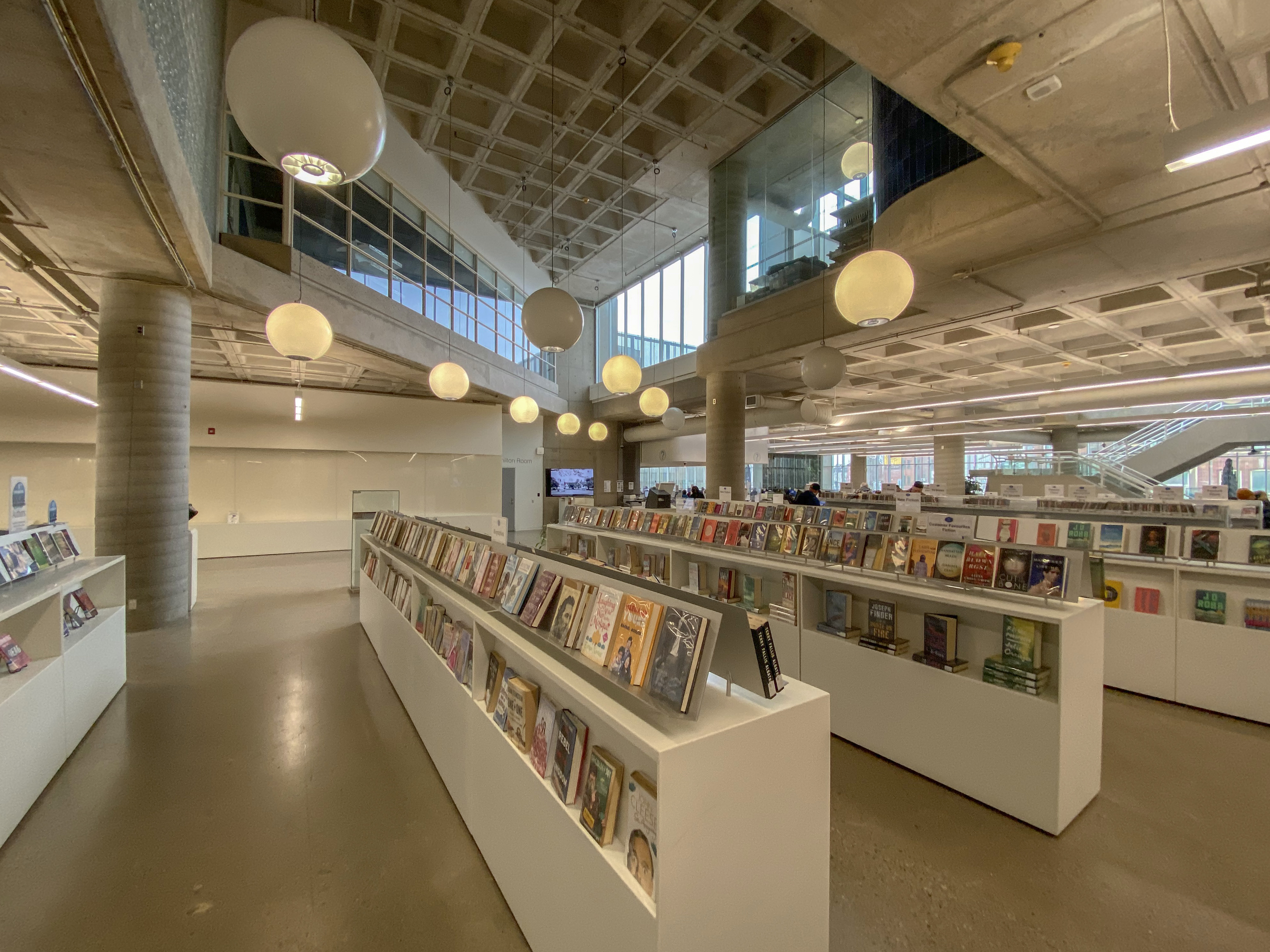
Hamilton Public Library - Central Library interior

Branch Name	Address	Location within city
Ancaster	300 Wilson St. E.	Ancaster
Barton	571 Barton St. E.	East
Binbrook	2641 Highway 56	Binbrook
Carlisle	1496 Center Rd	Carlisle
Central Library	55 York Blvd.	Downtown
Concession	565 Concession St.	Central Mountain
Dundas	18 Ogilvie St.	Dundas
Freelton	1803 Brock Rd.	Freelton
Greensville	59 Kirby Ave.	Dundas
Kenilworth	103 Kenilworth Ave. N.	East
Locke	285 Locke St. S.	Downtown
Lynden	110 Lynden Rd.	Lynden
Mount Hope	3027 Homestead Drive	Mount Hope
Parkdale	256 Parkdale Ave N.	East
Red Hill	695 Queenston Rd.	East
Saltfleet	131 Grays Rd.	Stoney Creek
Sherwood	467 Upper Ottawa St.	East Mountain
Stoney Creek	777 Highway 8	Stoney Creek
Terryberry	100 Mohawk Rd. W.	West Mountain
Turner Park	352 Rymal Road East	South Mountain
Valley Park	970 Paramount Dr.	East Mountain
Waterdown	163 Dundas St. E.	Waterdown
Westdale	955 King St W.	West
West Harbour	77 Harbourside Way	North End

== See also ==
- Freda Farrell Waldon
- List of Carnegie libraries in Canada
