= Canadian Library Association =

Canadian library organization (1946–2016)

- Abbreviation: CLA
- Successor: Canadian Federation of Library Associations
- Formation: 1946
- Dissolved: 2016
- Type: Library Association
- Purpose: advocate and public voice, educator and network
- Headquarters: Ottawa, Ontario
- Region served: Canada
- Members: 60 organizations
- Official language: English; French
- Website: www.cla.ca

The Canadian Library Association (CLA) was a national, predominantly English-language association which represented 57,000 library workers across Canada. It also spoke for the interests of the 21 million Canadians who are members of libraries. CLA members worked in all four types of libraries: academic (college and university), public, special (corporate, non-profit and government) and school libraries. Others sat on boards of public libraries, work for companies that provide goods and services to libraries, or were students in graduate level or community college programs.

CLA's Mission Statement was: "CLA is the national voice for Canada's library communities. As members, we:

- champion library values and the value of libraries
- influence public policy impacting libraries
- inspire and support member learning
- collaborate to strengthen the library community"

The statement highlights the Association's advocacy role on behalf of the Canadian library and information community.

As of January, 2016, the organization claimed it had 924 paid members, although it is unclear whether this means personal members, or total membership (including corporate, associate, institutional, and honorary members). The executive council claims it had spent several years dealing with the difficulties of declining membership, efficiency, and financial power.

On January 27, 2016, the CLA membership formally voted to disband the organization. The last CLA Forum was held in June 2016 in Ottawa, Ontario. The CLA was replaced by the Canadian Federation of Library Associations, which was incorporated on May 16, 2016.

== History ==
The Canadian Library Association (CLA) was founded in Hamilton, Ontario in 1946, and was incorporated under the Companies Act on November 26, 1947. Freda Farrell Waldon was its first president, serving in the year 1947. CLA is a non-profit voluntary organization, governed by an elected Executive Council, which is advised by over forty interest groups and committees.

In May 2002, the membership was at a grand total of 2,721, including 2216 personal, 505 institutional, and 187 associate members.

As of December 2014, the last time at which information was available, total membership in the CLA (through its various membership types) was 1,283:

- Personal – 957
- Institutions – 249
- Corporate – 50
- Associate – 27

In June 2016, the CLA was dissolved and its functions taken by several associations, including the Ontario Library Association and the Canadian Federation of Library Associations.

== Committees ==
The CLA was supported by two types of committees: advisory committees and standing committees. As the need arose, new committees were formed by the Executive Council. Existing CLA members were primarily considered in the member selection process.

=== Advisory committees ===
The Executive Council created advisory committees to address topics of strategic professional interest to the CLA. These committees were either long-term or short-term. Some of the advisory committees that supported the CLA were:

- Copyright Advisory Committee
- Information Policy Advisory Committee
- Intellectual Freedom Advisory Committee
- School Libraries Advisory Committee
- Royal Society of Canada: Brief Development Team for CLA Submission

=== Standing committees ===
The Executive Council created long-term standing committees to actively govern the CLA. These committees contributed to the continuing operation of the CLA, and included:

- Conference Standing Committee
- Elections Standing Committee
- Finance Standing Committee
- Member Communications Standing Committee
- Monograph Publications Standing Committee
- Nominations Standing Committee
- Participation Standing Committee
- Resolutions Standing Committee

== Student chapters ==
Recognizing that there was a need for close association between the Canadian Library Association and students in library school, the Canadian Library Association always encouraged students to join CLA, network and become involved active members of the library community.

In March 1999, CLA's first Student Chapter was officially launched at the University of Western Ontario.

Since that time, Student Chapters were launched at the University of British Columbia, University of Toronto, University of Alberta, McGill University and Dalhousie University and in 2006 at the Nova Scotia Community College Institute of Technology Campus.

Student chapters of the Canadian Library Association allowed for professional development and networking opportunities for students enrolled in library and information science programs.

== Book awards ==
CLA presented three annual awards recognizing books for young people that were published in Canada during the preceding year (and nominated by the end of November). The writer, or the illustrator for the Howard-Gibbon Award, must be a citizen or permanent resident of Canada.

The Amelia Frances Howard-Gibbon Illustrator's Award was presented every year since it was inaugurated in 1971, when the winner was Elizabeth Cleaver for The Wind Has Wings: Poems from Canada, which she wrote and illustrated.

The Book of the Year for Children Award has been presented every year from 1963 when the winner was Sheila Burnford for The Incredible Journey (also adapted as a Disney film that year). The Book of the Year was inaugurated in 1947, recognizing the 1943 novel Starbuck Valley Winter by Roderick Haig-Brown, and it was awarded ten times prior to 1963.

The Young Adult Book Award has been presented every year since it was inaugurated in 1981, when the winner was Kevin Major for Far from Shore (1980).

== See also ==
- Library and information science
- American Library Association
- List of library associations specific to Canadian territories
- Open access in Canada
