= Brian Deer Classification System =

Indigenous Canadian library classification system

The Brian Deer Classification System (BDC) is a library classification system used to organize materials in libraries with specialized Indigenous collections. The system was created in the mid-1970s by Canadian librarian A. Brian Deer, a Kahnawake Mohawk. It has been adapted for use in a British Columbia version, and also by a small number of First Nations libraries in Canada.

== History and usage ==
Deer designed his classification system while working in the library of the National Indian Brotherhood (now the Assembly of First Nations) from 1974 to 1976. Instead of using a standard library classification scheme, such as that of the Library of Congress, he created a new system to organize the library's historic indigenous research materials and papers. He later worked at the library of the Union of British Columbia Indian Chiefs, where he developed a system for its holdings. He returned to Kahnawake, working at its Cultural Centre at Kahnawake and the Kahnawake Branch branch of the Mohawk Nation Office. His system was flexible, and he created new forms for their collections.

The new systems Deer created were designed specifically for the materials in each collection according to the concerns of local Indigenous people at the time (for example, categories included land claims, treaty rights, resource management, and Elders' stories). Between 1978 and 1980, the system was adapted for use in British Columbia by Gene Joseph and Keltie McCall while they were working at the Union of British Columbia Indian Chiefs, becoming known as BDC-BC. Joseph later adapted it further for use in the Xwi7xwa Library at University of British Columbia, Vancouver.

Though the Brian Deer Classification was not created as a universal classification solution for Indigenous resources, the system has provided a foundation for specialized libraries to create their own localized classification schemes.

Variations of the Brian Deer Classification System are used in a small number of Canadian libraries. One prominent library using BDC is the X̱wi7x̱wa Library at the University of British Columbia, which uses a British Columbia-focused version of BDC along with First Nations House of Learning subject headings. The Union of British Columbia Indian Chiefs Resource Centre issued a revised BDC-BC in 2014, with the goal of providing users with a more flexible and culturally appropriate approach to organizing their resources.

The Aanischaaukamikw Cree Cultural Institute in Oujé-Bougoumou, Quebec, implemented a local adaptation of BDC when they opened in 2012.

In 2020 the Carrier Sekani Tribal Council in Prince George, British Columbia, shifted from organizing its library with the Dewey Decimal Classification to using a version of the BDC. They added new subject heading categories for topics of local interest such as the crisis of Missing and murdered Indigenous women.

Simon Fraser University Library began developing the Indigenous Curriculum Resource Centre (ICRC) in 2020, with the physical space opening in 2023. The ICRC is Call to Action 21 of SFU's Aboriginal Reconciliation Council's final report, Walk This Path With Us. Through its collection, the ICRC supports those interested in learning about how and why decolonizing pedagogy and teaching practices are important. The physical items in the collection are catalogued using a modified Brian Deer Classification system.

In 2022 Kwantlen Polytechnic University’s χʷəχʷéy̓əm Indigenous Collection released a revised BDC-BC System. This BDC contains works exclusively with Indigenous authored materials and expands the cuttering systems of previous BDC, with the result that much of the collection reflects a spatial relationality. The implementation of this BDC was possible due to the tireless work at Xwi7xwa Library, Union of British Columbia Indian Chiefs Resource Centre, and Simon Fraser University Library's Indigenous Curriculum Resource Centre.

== Structure ==
The high-level organizational structure of BDC reflects a First Nations worldview, with an emphasis on relationships between and among people, animals, and the land. Subcategories demonstrate the relationships among First Nations by grouping them geographically as opposed to alphabetically; the latter is a practice frequently used for specific topics in the Library of Congress Classification.

The top-level hierarchy of the X̱wi7x̱wa Library adaptation of BDC-BC demonstrates the emphasis on access to subjects prioritized by a First Nation collection:

- Reference Materials
- Local History
- History
- International
- Education
- Economic Development
- Housing and Community Development
- Criminal Justice System
- Constitution (Canada) and First Nations
- Self Government
- Rights and Title
- Natural Resources
- Community Resources
- Health
- World View
- Fine Arts
- Languages
- Literature

The system is not designed to provide a comprehensive description of all topics of interest to North American Indigenous peoples; in addition, its use is limited in scope, being intended for small and specialized libraries. While English is used in the classification scheme as a common language among First Nations peoples and non-Indigenous library users, Indigenous spellings and terminology that local library users would expect to find are used to provide access. Short and easily remembered call numbers are used to facilitate use by both library workers and patrons, with the recognition that Indigenous libraries often have a small staff and limited resources to devote to cataloging. Beyond its simplicity, one potential drawback of the system is its shortage of clear guidelines for application, which provides flexibility but can also result in inconsistencies within and between library catalogs.

Because few libraries use the BDC and there are limited examples for use as case studies, implementing the system and keeping it up-to-date can prove a challenge for libraries with limited resources. However, X̱wi7x̱wa Library head librarian Ann Doyle describes the system as "an important part of the body of Indigenous scholarship" that should be retained as a reflection of Indigenous worldviews, as well as for ease of access for Indigenous library users.
