= Velma S. Salabiye =

Native American librarian

- Born: June 29, 1948; Bellemont, Arizona, US
- Died: July 29, 1996 (aged 48)
- Education: University of Arizona
- Occupation: Librarian

Velma S. Salabiye (June 29, 1948 – July 29, 1996) was a Navajo librarian and promoter of Native American librarianship. Salabiye served as the director of the University of California, Los Angeles American Indian Culture Center Library and was a founding member of the American Indian Library Association.

== Early life and education ==
Velma S. Salabiye was born in 1948 in Bellemont, Arizona. She graduated from St. Michael Indian School in 1966. She earned a bachelor's of arts degree in education in 1971 from the University of Arizona. In 1974 she also earned a Master of Library Science degree from the University of Arizona's Indian Graduate Library Institute.

== Library career ==
During her master's program, Salabiye interned at the Navajo Nation's Window Rock Public Library. In 1975, she created plans for what would become the Navajo Research and Statistics Center. She coordinated a meeting of the Special Libraries Association on the Navajo reservation in 1977. She was awarded a D'Arcy McNickle Fellowship from the Newberry Library Center for the History of the American Indian in 1979, studying the contributions of Navajo women to society.

Salabiye became the director of the UCLA American Indian Culture Center's library in 1980. She would serve as a librarian at UCLA until her death in 1996.

== Service to Native librarianship ==
In a 1978 article in the American Indian Library Association newsletter, Salabiye wrote about the need for Native peoples to have access to their own historical documents, stating that Native Americans:

as a people, have gone too long with non-Native Americans posing as keepers of written material about us. We deserve to know what has been written about us, to know what the general public is learning. We don't need any more cowboy-frontier stories; we don't need to be researched any more to earn someone a Ph.D. What we do need is information power to fight a modern world that has been able to use this powerful weapon against us for so long.

Salabiye advocated for information about Native peoples to be located accessibly to the people it describes, such as housing tribal archives on reservations. She also recognized the need for more Native American librarians.

Throughout her career, she wrote and co-wrote multiple works on American Indian library collections, promoting American Indian librarianship and collections. In 1987 she was recognized for her efforts in supporting library services to Indian tribes with a certificate of appreciation from the U.S. Department of Education's Office of Educational Research and Improvement. She became an assistant editor of the American Indian Culture and Research Journal in 1988.

Salabiye was active in the American Library Association and was elected to the organization's council in 1994. She was a founding member of the American Indian Library Association, an ethnic affiliate group of ALA. She died in the summer of 1996.

== Selected publications ==
- Salabiye, Velma S.; Young, James R. (1976). Annotated Bibliography of Materials Relating to the Sociocultural and the Economic Characteristics of the Navajo Nation and the Gallup Area, McKinley County, New Mexico.
- Salabiye, Velma S. (1978). "The library experience - a Native American viewpoint". American Indian Libraries Newsletter (2): 7–9.
- Salabiye, Velma S. (1983). "LIBRARY AND INFORMATION SERVICES". Community-Based Research: A Handbook for Native Americans (PDF). American Indian Studies Center, UCLA. pp. 199–202 (Chapter 8).
- Salabiye, Velma S. (1983). "Index to the American Indian Culture and Research Journal, 1974-1983". American Indian Culture and Research Journal. 7 (4): 109–136.
- Salabiye, Velma S. (1986). "Bibliography of Indian Humor". American Indian Libraries Newsletter. 10 (1): 2–4.
