= Freda Farrell Waldon =

Canadian librarian

Freda Farrell Waldon (August 29, 1898, in Winnipeg – 1973) was a Canadian librarian, who was the first president of the Canada Library Association.
