= Protocols for Native American Archival Materials =

Set of Best Professional Practices (SoBPP or SBPP)

The Protocols for Native American Archival Materials (PNAAM) is a set of best professional practices around the care and use of American Indian archival materials that are held in non-tribal libraries, archives, museums, and other cultural institutions.

== Development ==
PNAAM was originally developed by the First Archivist Circle in 2006 to promote conversation, collaboration, and cultural sensitivity. They were highly influenced by Australia's Aboriginal and Torres Strait Islander Protocols for Libraries, Archives, and Information Services. PNAAM complements the Native American Graves Protection and Repatriation Act of 1990, which does not cover the repatriation of archival materials that are not human remains or funerary items. Recent scholarship notes that the concept of archival sovereignty and the connection between archival practices and indigenous wellbeing have become more central part of conversations of indigenous archival materials. Many indigenous communities recognized how items are not just a piece of documentation but a piece of memory of those who came before us. This shows us how PNAAM and NAGPRA go hand in hand with each other, how it is important to have these rules about how indigenous culture is archived.

Archivists and other activists presented the document to the Society of American Archivists (SAA) in 2008 and again in 2012, but SAA declined to endorse the document both times. Critics' comments included culturally insensitive and white supremacist language and promoted the traditional Western view of archives, that all researchers should be provided with unrestricted access to archival materials. Research shows that many Native American tribes maintain cultural specific information that is based on either the season, the gender, or the ceremony. The Information that these tribes possess is sacred to them so we cannot look at archiving in a constant western view where all the knowledge has to be included. It is important to recognize what problems arise when trying to implement western methods into indigenous background. Studies of library and archival description have shown that indigenous items are often inaccurately described in Western cataloging systems which leads to misrepresentation in the subject and in the metadata. This misrepresentation is what leads to a tribe being overlooked or thought to have disappeared because of the simple category they were put into that combined different people into one.

Prior to national endorsement, several institutions adopted the protocols independently, such as the American Philosophical Society and Northern Arizona University's Cline Library, where PNAAM was originally drafted. In 2018, the SAA Council endorsed PNAAM. It was endorsed by the Association of College and Research Libraries in 2020.
