= 1969 White Paper =

Policy paper issued by the Government of Canada

The 1969 White Paper (officially entitled Statement of the Government of Canada on Indian Policy) was a policy paper proposal set forth by the Government of Canada related to First Nations. Prime Minister Pierre Trudeau and his Minister of Indian Affairs, Jean Chrétien, issued the paper in 1969. The White Paper proposed to abolish all legal documents that had previously existed, including (but not limited to) the Indian Act, and all existing treaties within Canada, comprising Canadian Aboriginal law. It proposed to assimilate First Nations as an ethnic group equal to other Canadian citizens. The White Paper was met with widespread criticism and activism, causing the proposal to be officially withdrawn in 1970.

The White Paper proposed legislation to eliminate Indian status. Indigenous people would be granted full rights as citizens instead of being regarded as wards of the state. First Nations Peoples would be incorporated fully into provincial government responsibilities as equal Canadian citizens, and reserve status would be removed; laws of private property would be imposed in Indigenous communities. Any special programs or considerations that had been allowed to First Nations people under previous legislation would be terminated. The Government believed that such special considerations acted to separate Indigenous peoples from other Canadian citizens.

== Background ==
After fighting in the First and Second World Wars on behalf of the United Kingdom, First Nations peoples returned home motivated to improve their status and living conditions in Canada. In 1945, the government abolished the pass system, which for 60 years had restricted status Indians to reserves. They could leave only with a pass issued by an Indian Agent. With more freedom of movement, status Indians could become more involved in Canadian society. Parliament created a Special Joint Committee in 1946, which, with the help of the Senate and the House of Commons, sought to assess the effects of the Indian Act of 1876.

In the late 1950s, activism continued to rise on reserves; by the 1960s, a widespread civil rights movement had blossomed. In 1963, the journalist Peter Gzowski published an article "Our Alabama" in Maclean's, exploring the murder of Allan Thomas (Saulteaux) on 11 May 1963 by nine white men in Saskatchewan. He reported that the murder seemed casually accepted by the local white population; Gzowski was told that Thomas was "just an Indian."

By the late 1960s, inspired by the Black Power movement in the United States, a Red Power movement had emerged in Canada. Several activists advocated aggressive actions, quoting Malcolm X and saying that they would achieve their own goals "by any means necessary". Malcolm X was not talking about the status of First Nations peoples in Canada, but his militant advocacy of Black Pride, racial separatism, and a willingness to use violence made him a hero to the Canada's budding "Red Power" movement.

Activists noted the abuses of First Nations peoples and the deplorable conditions in which many were forced to live. In 1963 the federal government commissioned anthropologist Harry Hawthorn to examine the social conditions of First Nations people in Canada. In 1966, he published his report, A Survey of the Contemporary Indians of Canada: Economic, Political, Educational Needs and Policies. He concluded that Canada's Aboriginal peoples were the most marginalized and disadvantaged group among the Canadian public. It described them as "citizens minus." Hawthorn attributed these conditions to years of bad government policy, especially the Indian residential school system, which failed to provide students with the necessary skills to succeed in the modern economy. Hawthorn recommended all forced assimilation programs, such as the residential schools, be abolished, and that Aboriginal peoples be seen as "citizens plus", and given opportunities and resources for self-determination.

In 1968, the Liberals, under their new leader, Pierre Trudeau, won the election of that year under the slogan of creating the "Just Society." In late 1968, as part of the "Just Society," Jean Chrétien, the Minister of Indian Affairs, set out to amend the Indian Act. The federal government issued the information booklet Choosing a Path and consulted Aboriginal communities across Canada in pursuit of an amendment to the Indian Act. In 1969, a CBC Television documentary was aired about the life on reserves in northern Saskatchewan. It focused on several unsolved murders of Indians and Métis, and implied that they been killed by whites. The presenter of the documentary characterized the reserves of northern Saskatchewan, where the people lived at a Third World level of poverty, as the "Mississippi of Canada", referring to a poor state in the Deep South of the United States. He drew public attention to the First Nations issue.

In May 1969, the government held a meeting of regional Aboriginal leaders from across the nation in Ottawa. It heard their concerns about Aboriginal and treaty rights, land title, self-determination, education, and health care. After the consultations, Chrétien presented the government's White Paper to the House of Commons on June 25, 1969.

Trudeau's philosophy tended to favour individual rights over group rights. For instance, he argued that the best way of protecting French-Canadian rights, as in Quebec, was to strengthen individual rights. although group rights were favoured by many of his fellow French-Canadians. Given that background, Trudeau had questioned the Indian Act, and proposed abolishing it. Trudeau considered the Indian Act as an anomaly that treated one group of Canadians as different from the others.

== Provisions ==
When presenting the White Paper in 1969, Trudeau and Chrétien proposed it as a definitive means of dealing with First Nations issues. They suggested that existing policies that applied only to Indigenous peoples were discriminatory in nature, since they did not apply to other Canadian citizens. The paper proposed eliminating Indian status as a distinct legal status within Canada. The paper proposed that this would make First Nations Peoples equal to other Canadians by making them official Canadian citizens with the franchise. The Paper said that Indian status was derived from legislation that encouraged separation among peoples, and its benefits occurred too slowly to be efficient and effective. The White Paper also proposed all special programs available to Indigenous peoples because of their Indian status should be removed. This would end special or individualized treatment by ethnicity. Trudeau's vision of a just society was one in which all discriminatory legislation was repealed. The Paper said that eliminating Indian status would "enable the Indian people to be free—free to develop Indian cultures in an environment of legal, social and economic equality with other Canadians.".

Specific provisions included abolishing the Department of Indian Affairs within five years, abolishing the reserve system, and converting reserve land into private property owned by the band or Aboriginal landholders, which could be sold on a fee simple basis. A $50 million fund for economic development was to be established to compensate for the termination of the treaties and the Indian Act. A commissioner would be appointed to investigate outstanding land claims by First Nations and to terminate treaties. Finally, the White Paper proposed transferring jurisdiction for Aboriginal affairs from the federal government to the provinces, and gradually integrating services to them with the services provided to other Canadian citizens.

== Response ==
Opponents thought that the White Paper proposals failed to meet any historical promises that had been made by the federal government to First Nations people in Canada. In addition, they thought the Paper failed to take into account any of the suggestions made by Indigenous peoples during the consultations while the paper was drafted. The Paper did not honour any of the promises made to Indigenous peoples by the Canadian government for reparations to compensate for previous injustices suffered because of government policies and actions. The Paper also did not include any proposal for meaningful Aboriginal participation in public policymaking.

A major First Nations grievance about the White Paper was the sweeping claim that the Canadian state would change their entire status without being allowed any input. The way that Chrétien had invited First Nations leaders to Ottawa to consult them in May 1969 and a month later introduced the White Paper, whose conclusions were the opposite of what they had wanted, was seen as a betrayal. The White Paper was seen by First Nations as an arrogant document, with the state declaring that it knew better about what was good for them than they did themselves. Also, the White Paper gave only the most limited recognition to First Nations land claims and implied that would be no more land claims, as it argued the First Nations peoples would become part of Canadian society and would own land as individuals, just like anyone else.

Although the White Paper recognized past policy failures by the federal government and the socio-economic situation of Aboriginal peoples, it was seen by many Aboriginal peoples as the latest in a series of attempts at cultural assimilation. Aboriginal leaders were outraged that their demands for amendment of the Indian Act during the consultations had been largely ignored and met with a proposal for abolishment. The scholar Gordon Gibson noted that many Indigenous people had become accustomed to the reserve system and so attached to it despite its many "defects" and were thus stunned by the news of its proposed abolition, which would mean a complete alternation in their way of life.

It was the 1969 White Paper that first brought Chrétien to widespread public attention in Canada. At a press conference announcing the White Paper, Chrétien openly clashed with Indigenous activists, with one First Nations woman asking Chrétien "When did we lose our identity?" to which he replied, "When you signed the treaties," which prompted boos and jeers. Another woman from the Haudenosaunnee (Iroquois) reserve at Brantford asked Chrétien, "How can you come here and ask us to become citizens, when we were here long before you?"; she noted that the Crown had granted the Grand River Valley to Joseph Brant in 1784, to which Chrétien had no reply. Chrétien's response made him very unpopular among many Indian activists. However, Chrétien felt that the White Paper was in the best interests of the First Nations and was rather taken aback by the charges made against him of "cultural genocide."

One prominent critic of the White Paper was Harold Cardinal, a Cree leader of the Indian Association of Alberta, who referred to it as "a thinly disguised programme of extermination through assimilation" in his bestselling 1969 book The Unjust Society, which attacked the premise that a society that treated its Aboriginal population like Canada did could be considered "just". The title of Cardinal's book, with its inversion of Trudeau's slogan of a "just society," was one of the many ways that Cardinal used rhetorical devices to make his points. Cardinal attacked in his book what he called the "buckskin curtain" to convey what he regarded as the indifference shown by Canadian society to First Nations concerns. The "buckskin curtain" was an allusion to the "Iron Curtain" that divided the communist states of Eastern Europe from the democratic states of Western Europe, and Cardinal was suggesting that Canada had acted similarly with its First Nations peoples by the Indian Act. Cardinal wrote that Cree like himself wanted to remain "a red tile in the Canadian mosaic" and that the First Nations were equally opposed to "a White Paper for white people created by the white elephant." Cardinal called the assumptions of the White Paper "cultural genocide" and argued that Trudeau and Chrétien had merely changed the traditional American slogan for dealing with the Indians "the only good Indian is a dead Indian" to "the only good Indian is a non-Indian." Cardinal ridiculed the claim that Trudeau and Chrétien would "lead the Indians to the promised land" and insisted that the First Nations people had to determine their own fates without the government telling them what to do.

Cardinal considered the White Paper as "passing the buck" to the provinces and led the association's 1970 rejection of the White Paper Citizens Plus. The document, which was popularly known as the Red Paper, embodied the national Aboriginal stance on the White Paper its statement: "There is nothing more important than our treaties, our lands and the well-being of our future generations." Though just one part of the overall reason, Citizens Plus played a primary role in the Canadian Government's decision to retract the White Paper. The controversy served to mobilize the more recent Indigenous rights movements. Many of the groups that emerged from the movement were considered to be pioneers in the organization of Indigenous peoples past a locally involved level. Among the groups were 33 provincial organizations and 4 national Indigenous associations. Opposition to the White Paper created the first national First Nations movement spanning the entire country. However, the opposition led to the sidelining of the young Red Power militants and reinforced the traditional ascendancy of the band chiefs as the leaders of the First Nations communities. Across the country, more Indian friendship centres began to emerge more than before. One of the key points to the newfound Indigenous activism was the focus on the growth of what the term Indigenous rights meant, and by 1981, it had been changed to include a focus on not only land rights but also self-government.

In November 1969, Rose Charlie of the Indian Homemakers' Association, Philip Paul of the Southern Vancouver Island Tribal Federation, and Don Moses of the North American Indian Brotherhood invited British Columbia's band leaders to join them in Kamloops to build a response to the White Paper. Representatives from 140 bands were present and formed the Union of British Columbia Indian Chiefs (UBCIC) during the conference. The White Paper was considered to be especially provocative in British Columbia, as the Crown had never signed treaties with any of the Indigenous peoples of British Columbia on land cessation and so the White Paper was felt to be an attempt by the Trudeau government to avoid dealing with the issue.

In 1970, UBCIC published A Declaration of Indian Rights: The B.C. Indian Position Paper, or the "Brown Paper", which rejected the White Paper and asserted the continued existence of Aboriginal title. The Brown Paper proposed that new programs and services should be put in place for Indigenous peoples to help them to continue to grow and to thrive at a pace that is consistent with Indigenous beliefs and culture. While it stated that it was the responsibility of the federal Government to institute the new social and economic programs, it also emphasized that such programs should not be overseen or administered by the government but simply set them up in a way that Indigenous communities could facilitate the programs themselves. It also discussed how Indigenous peoples should not surrender self-governance and control of Indigenous issues simply because they denied federal control.

Many public protests and marches were held opposing the White Paper and demanding more appropriate action be taken to address First Nations issues. Indian Affairs offices as well as a park in Ontario were occupied, and bridges were blockaded in many areas. In 1970, Trudeau withdrew the White Paper and said at a press conference, "We'll keep them in the ghetto as long as they want." In 1974, a caravan consisting of many Native people traveled the county to gather support for its opposition. Its main goal was to spread the message that there should be constitutional recognition for the rights of Indigenous peoples, including non-status Indians and Métis. That movement would go on to be known as "Red Power."

== Abandonment ==
The government's initial response to the backlash was to defend the White Paper. On August 8, 1969, Trudeau gave a speech in Vancouver in which he defended the objective of terminating the treaties: "It's inconceivable I think that in a given society, one section of the society have a treaty with the other section of the society." In the same speech, he added "We can't recognize aboriginal rights because no society can be built on historical 'might-have-beens.'"

At the beginning of June 1970, leaders of the National Indian Brotherhood gathered at Carleton University in Ottawa, and on June 3, they endorsed the Red Paper as their official response to the White Paper. On June 4, the Indigenous leaders obtained a meeting with the full cabinet in the Railway Committee Room in Parliament. They presented the White Paper and the Red Paper, symbolically rejecting the former by placing it on the table in front of Chrétien and endorsing the latter by handing a copy to Trudeau. Surprising many, Trudeau responded by acknowledging the White Paper as a failure. Though he did not apologize for it, he admitted, "We had perhaps the prejudices of small 'l" liberals and white men at that who thought that equality meant the same law for everybody."

By July 1970, the Canadian government had backed away from the recommendations of the White Paper. Trudeau officially withdrew the White Paper proposal in 1970, but Indigenous activism continued.

== Advancements in relations ==
Despite the abandonment, many still feel that the intent of the White Paper and the values of its legislation continue to be held by the Canadian government and that assimilation remains the long-term goal.

In 1973, the Supreme Court of Canada's Calder v. British Columbia finished the debate by recognizing Aboriginal title in Canadian law and agreeing that Indigenous title to land claims has existed significantly before European colonization in Canada. The case was brought to the courts by the Nisga'a chief Frank Calder. Its purpose was to review the existence of Indigenous land title, which had been claimed over lands that had been previously occupied by the Nisga'a people of British Columbia. The case was lost, but the Supreme Court's final ruling noted for the first time that Indigenous land title had a place in Canadian law. The case served as the basis for the creation of the Nisga'a Treaty in 2000, which established the Nisga'a people's right to self-govern in its traditional territory.

In 1982, Indigenous and treaty rights were recognized in Section 35 of the Constitution Act, becoming part of the Canadian Constitution.

Amendments to the Indian Act occurred in 1985, and one of the key concepts of the act, the concept of enfranchisement, was removed. That part of the Indian Act has been one of the main goals of the policy, and part of official legislation for over a century. It reinstated Indian Status that had been lost and its rights of band membership for those people who had lost them by either compulsory enfranchisement, or inheritance policies. The amendments to the Indian Act recognized that bands would facilitate the control of band membership themselves.

On February 23, 2014, the Liberal Party of Canada, at its biennial convention, renounced with regret the White Paper of 1969 as a step towards reconciliation between the First Nations, Canada and the party. Under legislation brought forth by Liberal Prime Minister Justin Trudeau, the Royal Commission on Aboriginal People was dissolved and replaced by two new and separate ministers: Minister of Indigenous Services and the Minister of Crown–Indigenous Relations. The responsibilities of the Department of Indigenous Services includes overseeing matters as they pertain to the improvement in the quality of services that Indigenous peoples are receiving, with the eventual goal of the services being handled by the Indigenous communities themselves, rather than the government outside of the Indigenous community. Indigenous relations with the government include issues of treaty right and self-governance are overseen by the Department of Crown-Indigenous Relations and Northern Affairs. The goal of the departments is described by the government as one of the next steps towards the eventual abolishment of the Indian Act.

== See also ==
- Indian termination policy - American equivalent
- Canadian aboriginal law - the Canadian State's laws towards Indigenous peoples
- Canadian Indigenous law - the First Nations laws regarded collectively
