= Gene Joseph =

Gene Anne Joseph is a Wet'suwet'en Nadleh'dena First Nations librarian from Hagwilget, British Columbia. She was the founding librarian of the Xwi7xwa Library at the University of British Columbia and the first librarian of First Nations descent in British Columbia. In 2018, she received an honorary Doctor of Laws from Vancouver Island University. The British Columbia Library Association, the First Nations Interest Group, and the University of British Columbia First Nations House of Learning created an endowed scholarship in her name.

== Education ==
Joseph began studies at the post-secondary level in 1972 at Langara College where she was one of the only First Nations students. She went on to complete her bachelors and masters of library science degrees at the University of British Columbia.

== Career ==
Joseph began her professional career at the Union of BC Indian Chiefs Resource Centre. She reportedly was at first rejected for this position, but was hired after writing a letter to Chief George Manuel, the then President. She was employed there for three years before returning to school to obtain her Masters of Library Science. She went on to work at the Indian Education Resource Centre, established by the BC Native Indian Teachers Association in the early 1970s to organize the collection. She became the founding librarian of the Xwi7xwa Library when the Indian Education Resource Centre became the Xwi7xwa Library.

Joseph has an abiding concern with the way First Nations people and knowledge was represented in libraries and spent her career actively creating new classification systems and subject headings to amend misrepresentation common in standard systems, such as the Library of Congress Classification system. Between 1978 and 1980 she adapted the Brian Deer classification system for the Xwi7xwa Library. Joseph recognized the way the materials in the library were organized was vital to the overarching culture of the library and the use of an Indigenous classification system was vital to the philosophy of Xwi7xwa.

In 1992, she published the Sharing the knowledge: a First Nations resource guide which includes information on First Nations culture and history, issues facing First Nations and resources on future directions for achieving recognition of aboriginal rights.

She was active in creating resource libraries for First Nations seeking recognition of aboriginal title. Joseph developed the legal research library for the Gitxsan and Wet’suwet’en First Nations to support the Delgamuukw et al v. the Queen et al case. This included the use of oral histories, which Joseph organized and provided access to through computer software and databases. Because these systems were new, Joseph adapted and developed systems to accommodate oral history documents as well as other materials. Further, the use of oral histories in a case of this nature set precedent as did the extensive use of computerized documents and a detailed map documenting traditional land use, which Joseph helped to prepare. Joseph worked for the Haida aboriginal title case and advises and oversees research and litigation support for the Haida Aboriginal Title Case at White Raven Law.

She also worked with the EAGLE (Environmental Aboriginal Guardianship through Law and Education) organization from 2002 to 2006.

Joseph has been a mentor for Indigenous librarians in Canada, especially in connection to the School of Information Studies at the University of British Columbia. Joseph is also a speaker at events, such as International Indigenous Librarians' Forum. Joseph has worked on a committee developing the Library Technician Program for First Nations students at the University College of the Fraser Valley.

== Works ==
- Joseph, Gene. Sharing the knowledge: a First Nations resource guide. Vancouver: Legal Services Society, 1992. NW016.3231 J67 1992.
- Burns, Kathleen, Doyle, Ann, Joseph, Gene, & Krebs, Allison. (2009). Indigenous librarianship. M. J. Bates, & M.N. Maack (Eds.), Encyclopedia of library and information sciences (3rd ed.). Boca Raton, FL: Taylor & Francis.
- Joseph, Gene and Kim Lawson. 2003. "First Nations and British Columbia Public Libraries." Feliciter. 49(5): 245-247.
