= Association of Tribal Archives, Libraries, & Museums =

The Association of Tribal Archives, Libraries, & Museums (ATALM) is dedicated to serving the needs of cultural organizations worldwide, with an emphasis on indigenous peoples in the United States. It is based in Oklahoma City, Oklahoma, and is affiliated with the Institute of Museum and Library Services, based in Washington, D.C. ATALM also maintains close ties with numerous state, regional, and tribal library, museum, and cultural associations, including the National Museum of the American Indian, the Library of Congress, the Sustainable Heritage Network, Amigos Library Services, and several other museums, consortia, and libraries. It is largely funded by grants from the Institute of Museum and Library Services and other affiliated institutions.

== History and mission ==
ATALM was officially founded in 2010, building upon work begun at the 2002 National Conference of Tribal Archives, Libraries, and Museums, in Mesa, Arizona, and continued at subsequent conferences in 2005, 2007, 2008, and 2009. Initial funding came from the Institute of Museum and Library Services, the Arizona State Museum, and the Western Council of Libraries. It has sponsored conferences since its inception, continuing the tradition that led to its incorporation in 2010. ATALM seeks to provide support to indigenous archives, libraries, and museums through programming, collaborative work, and advocacy. ATALM further works to guarantee that indigenous nations will, through tribal memory institutions, be empowered to conserve and house their own historical documents, artifacts, and histories.

== Membership and governance ==
As an association of tribal memory institutions, ATALM seeks to ensure representation from a wide range of tribal nations in order to guarantee that the Association maintains cultural relevancy as well as an indigenous perspective. ATALM has both a board and an advisory council. Its current president is Susan Feller, while its administrative vice president is Melissa Brodt. Both the board and advisory council are composed of representatives from many tribal nations with a broad range of library, museum, and archival experiences.

== Strategic plan and future ==
ATALM's strategic planning committee works to guide the Association and to respond to its members' needs as it builds a plan for the Association's future. Much of the work is informed by a Feasibility Survey Report completed in 2008, prior to ATALM's official incorporation. The Strategic Planning committee works to secure funding and build sustainable strategies for programming, advocacy, and training, among other things. ATALM's aim is for sustainability, growth, and continued advocacy, and its strategic planning committee works towards all goals.

== Surveys, engagement, and advocacy ==
Part of ATALM's core mission includes advocacy for tribal archives, libraries, and museums, as well as more generally for "cultural sovereignty of Native Nations". ATALM sponsors regular conferences pertaining to indigenous knowledge management, studies tribal libraries and the digital divide on reservations, and compiles numerous surveys and reports to better understand and serve its clientele.

=== Digital inclusion ===
ATALM conducted an extensive survey on the digital divide in Indian Country, producing in 2014 a lengthy report as well as resources for tribal memory institutions. Issues of digital inclusion are important to tribal libraries. Some areas lack access due to remote locations or extremely rough terrain, and many telecommunications companies have avoided reservations, as they do not believe the regions merit infrastructure investments. Moreover, Internet service is often low-speed and extremely expensive in tribal nations, and the FCC acknowledges that less than 10% of tribal land in Indian Country has broadband, further positing that the number may be even lower. ATALM's Digital Inclusion in Native Communities, assembled by Miriam Jorgensen, Traci Morris, and Susan Feller, is the first report to consider issues of Internet access in tribal libraries, and provides data on Internet in tribal libraries and on reservations as well as suggestions for improvement and advocacy as tribal memory institutions continue to evolve and move forward.

=== Surveys and reports ===
ATALM conducts regular surveys and compiles reports on tribal memory institutions. Much like Digital Inclusion in Native Communities, the reports draw on original research, including surveys and interviews with tribal memory institutions. Many reports also offer advocacy advice and suggestions for improving services or expanding ATALM's offerings. In keeping with its mission, ATALM includes documentation on indigenous peoples' rights with reports on tribal memory institutions.

== See also ==
- American Indian Library Association
- American Library Association
- Institute of Museum and Library Services
