= Union of British Columbia Indian Chiefs =

First Nations organization in Canada

- Abbreviation: UBCIC
- Formation: November 22, 1969; 56 years ago
- Founded at: Kamloops, British Columbia
- Headquarters: Suite 401 - 312 Main Street; Vancouver, British Columbia, V6A-2T2
- Locations: Vancouver, BC, Canada; Kamloops, BC, Canada
- Region served: British Columbia
- President: Grand Chief Stewart Phillip
- Vice-President: Chief Don Tom
- Website: www.ubcic.bc.ca

The Union of British Columbia Indian Chiefs (UBCIC) is a First Nations political organization founded in 1969 in response to Jean Chrétien's White Paper proposal to assimilate Status Indians and disband the Department of Indian Affairs.

Since the disbanding of the Allied Tribes of British Columbia in 1927, there had been many attempts to create a unified provincial organization, but conflict between the primarily coastal/Protestant Native Brotherhood of British Columbia and the primarily interior/Catholic National American Indian Brotherhood had been too great.

At a three-day meeting in November 1969 in Kamloops, 175 provincial chiefs unanimously voted to create the UBCIC. In 1971, the UBCIC adopts its Constitution and By-laws and is incorporated under the BC Societies Act.

== Leadership ==
UBCIC operates through an Executive Committee and a Chief's Council composed of chiefs representing member indigenous communities. The first three-person executive consisted of Victor Adolf, Heber Maitland, and Philip Paul.

=== Presidents ===
- George Manuel (President, 1979–1981)
- Robert (Bob) Manuel (1981–1983)
- Grand Chief Saul Terry (1983–1998)
- Grand Chief Stewart Phillip (1998–present)

=== Vice presidents ===
- Chief Robert Chamberlin, OWADI (2009–2019)
- Chief Don Tom (2019–present)

=== Secretary treasurers ===
- Kukpi7 Judy Wilson (2017–2022)
- Chief K̓áwáziɫ Marilyn Slett (2023–present)

== History ==
In 1969, then Prime Minister Pierre Trudeau and Minister of Indian Affairs Jean Chrétien released a policy document officially entitled Statement of the Government of Canada on Indian policy. Better known as the White Paper, this policy proposed a dismantling of the Indian Act and an end to the special relationship between Indigenous Peoples and the Canadian Government. Many Indigenous groups across Canada protested this policy change and expressed concern regarding the Canadian Government's failure to incorporate feedback raised during the consultation process. In British Columbia, a generation of emerging Indigenous leaders began to organize in response. Rose Charlie of the Indian Homemakers' Association, Philip Paul of the Southern Vancouver Island Tribal Federation and Don Moses of the North American Indian Brotherhood invited bands from across the province to a conference in Kamloops to discuss the policy and the recognition of Aboriginal title and rights more generally. The conference was a success with over 140 bands represented and it resulted in the formation of the Union of British Columbia Indian Chiefs, an organization dedicated to the resolution of land claims.

== Library and archives ==
UBCIC provides specialized research collections and services with a focus on BC land rights research for those with a band council resolution to conduct research on behalf of a First Nation or other researchers who abide to UBCIC's Ethical Research Policy. The library uses a modified version of the Brian Deer classification system, a library organizational system that better reflects Indigenous worldviews.
