= Xwi7xwa Library =

Library dedicated to the Indigenous peoples in Canada

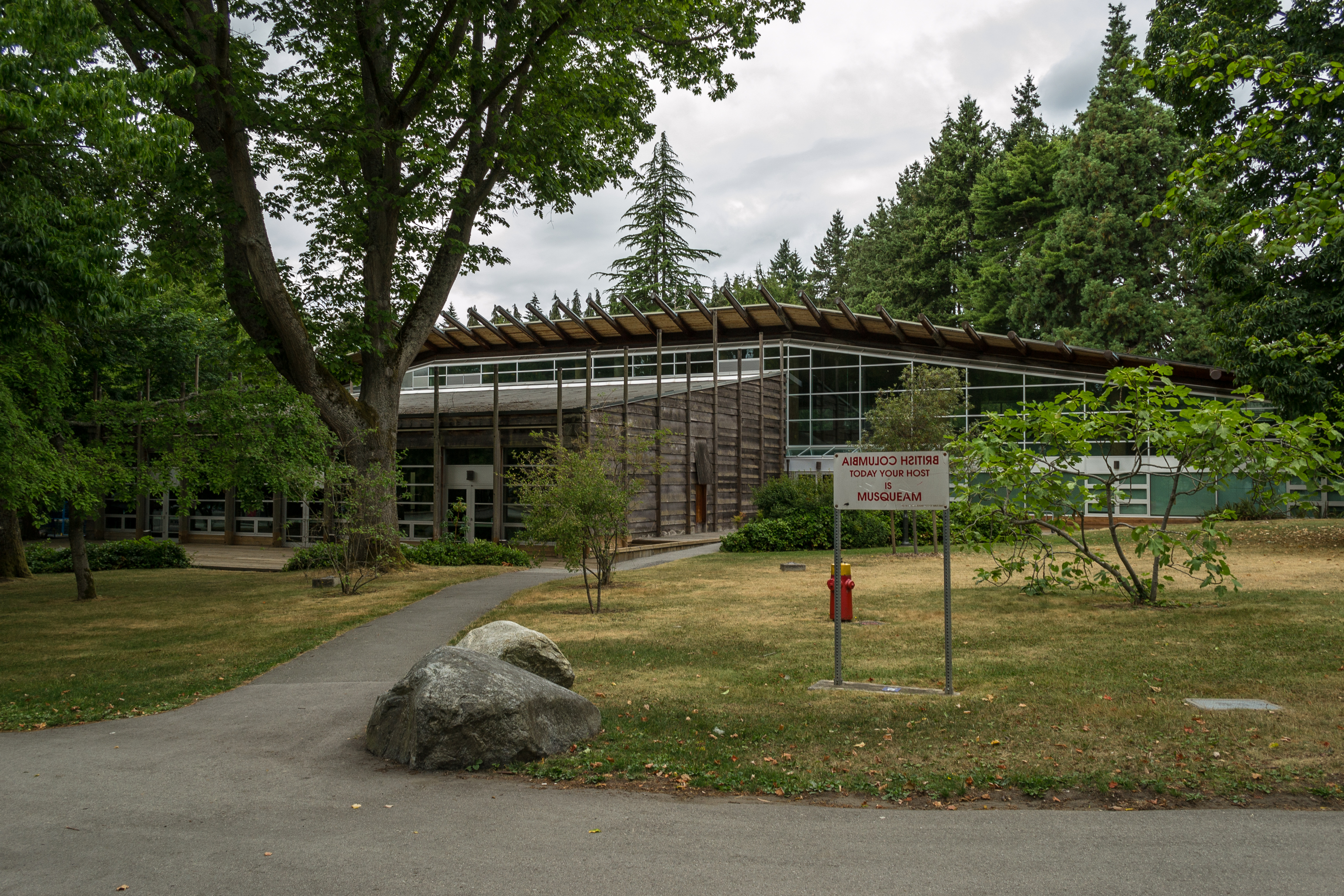
- UBC Longhouse 02
- 49.2654°N 123.2566°W
- Location: University of British Columbia, Greater Vancouver, Canada
- Type: Academic library, archives
- Branch of: University of British Columbia Library

The X̱wi7x̱wa Library (Squamish: [χʷiʔχʷa]) is an Indigenous library at the Vancouver campus of the University of British Columbia. The library, which draws its name from the Squamish word for echo, was named by Chief Simon Baker of the Squamish Nation. The library is notable for its approaches to organizing First Nations knowledge and major collections and holdings in a way that expresses Indigenous thought and culture. Holding some 15,000 items, it is fully integrated with the main library of UBC.

== History ==
X̱wi7x̱wa (pronounced "whei wha") Library began as a small collection of Aboriginal materials in a mobile home. The collection was maintained in conjunction with the University of British Columbia's (UBC) NITEP Indigenous Teacher Education Program.

In 1993, the library became the First Nations House of Learning Library, part of a longhouse for Indigenous students and scholars. The university's senate later established a X̱wi7x̱wa librarian position in 1995, which was first held by Gene Joseph.

The library became a branch of the UBC Library in 2005. It is the first First Nations branch of a Canadian academic library.

The library began digitizing materials related to the First Nations House of Learning Longhouse in 2008, with the goal of sharing university resources with Aboriginal people worldwide.

As of 2015, the library held over 15,000 items, consisting primarily of Indigenous materials, including those produced by First Nations peoples, organizations, schools, and tribal councils.

== Building ==
The primary donor and namesake for the library building was William Bellman; he was named X̱wi7x̱wa by Squamish Elder and Chief, Koot-la-cha.

The library building's design is inspired by buildings of the Interior Salish nations. Its primary structure is called a Kekuli in the Chinook jargon, a S7istken in Ucwalmicwts (Lil’wat nation), and a pit house in English.

The library building is integrated into the library's logo, which was created by Tsimshian artist Glen Wood. This logo represents the Raven transforming the university. The windows are decorated with the names of approximately eight hundred donors to the library.

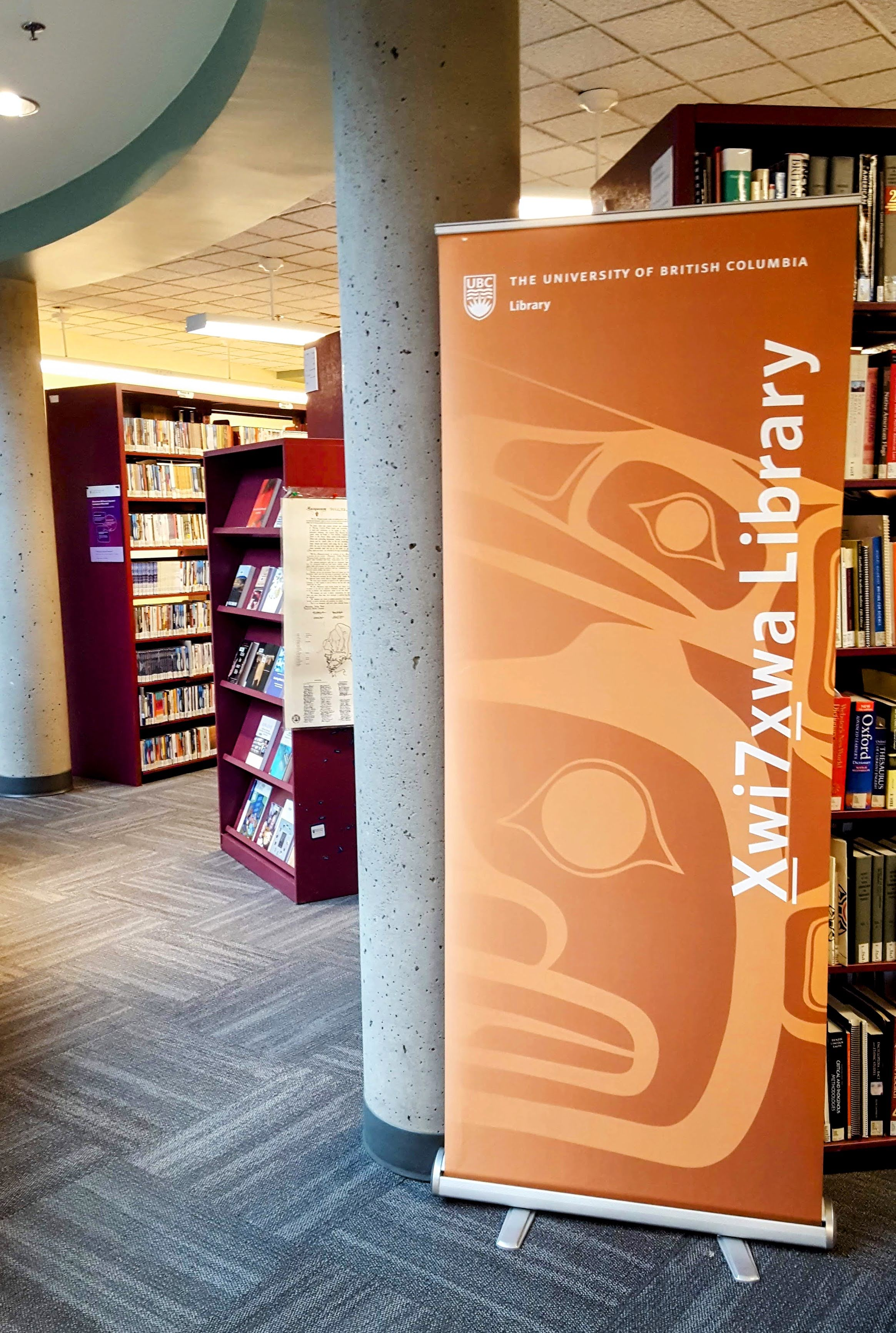
Interior of the X̱wi7x̱wa Library including a sign featuring the First Nations House of Learning logo

== Classification and cataloging ==
The X̱wi7x̱wa Library uses First Nations House of Learning (FNHL) Subject Headings, a local taxonomy that remedies many of the shortcomings of the Library of Congress Subject Headings with regard to First Nations materials. This classification system arranges First Nations geographically and refers to them by their own names (autonyms), rather than alphabetically by their European names. This is a British Columbia-specific variant of the Brian Deer Classification System, developed by librarian A. Brian Deer (Mohawk) in the late 20th century. This organization system gives priority to relationships in its structure, reflecting an Indigenous worldview.

In 2004, the 11,000 FNHL headings were lost due to a system migration. They were not recovered until 2009.

The library also records a subjective measure of suitability of materials that may be used to teach Indigenous children. This practice rejects dominant conceptions of cataloging as "objective". It recognizes the frequent misrepresentation of Indigenous peoples by mainstream European-Canadian and American cultures.
