= Western Counties Regional Library =

- Type: Regional Library
- Established: 1969
- Branches: 10

Collection
- Items collected: Books, journals, newspapers, sound recordings, databases, maps, drawings

Other information
- Employees: 60
- Website: Western Counties Regional Library website

Western Counties Regional Library is a regional public library with 10 branches serving the counties of Digby, Shelburne and Yarmouth in southwestern Nova Scotia. Established in June 1969, the library has its headquarters at 405 Main Street in the Town of Yarmouth, the largest population centre of the three counties.

== History ==
Western Counties Regional Library began with five staff in 1969 and has grown to 60 full- and part-time employees. Over the years, services were added such as bookmobiles (which were replaced by Library Express), visits to hospitals, seniors residences and schools and Library Express.

== Branches ==
All of the library branches offer free computer and wireless Internet access. Three of the branches offer bilingual services (Clare, Pubnico and Yarmouth). The following are the 10 branches making up Western Counties Regional Library with the dates that they joined the regional library and related branch information:

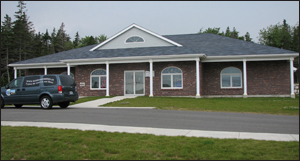
Barrington Municipal Library

Barrington Passage

• Joined Western Counties Regional Library: January 1970
• Branch opened: November 30, 1981
• Branch relocated: August 2, 2006

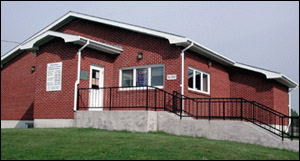
Senator Ambroise H. Comeau Memorial Library, Clare

Clare

• Joined Western Counties Regional Library: April 20, 1970
• Branch opened: July 8, 1981

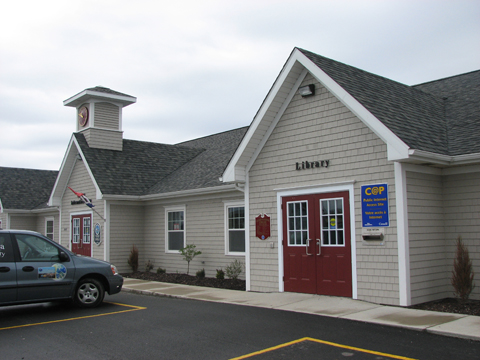
Clark's Harbour Branch Library

Clark's Harbour

• Joined Western Counties Regional Library: July 1971
• Branch opened: March 4, 1974
• Branch relocated: December 11, 2007

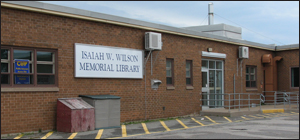
Isaiah W. Wilson Memorial Library, Digby

Digby

• Joined Western Counties Regional Library: June 1969
• Branch opened: January 15, 1970
• Branch relocated: 1979
• Branch relocated: January 31, 1997

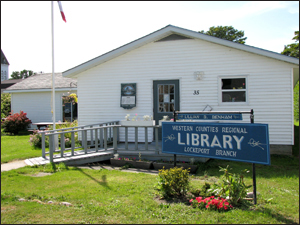
Lillian Benham Library, Lockeport

Lockeport

• Joined Western Counties Regional Library: June 5, 1969
• Branch opened: April 13, 1973
• Branch relocated: September 1, 1981
• Branch expansion: August 22, 1987

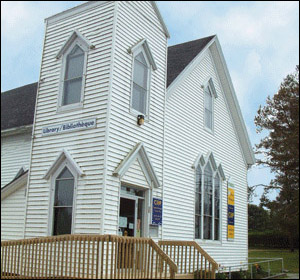
Pubnico Branch Library

Pubnico

• Joined Western Counties Regional Library: January 1970
• Branch opened: November 23, 1978

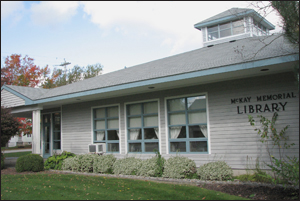
McKay Memorial Library, Shelburne

Shelburne

• Joined Western Counties Regional Library: June 5, 1969
• Branch opened: February 15, 1970
• Branch relocated: July 21, 1989

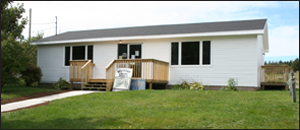
Westport Branch Library

Westport

• Joined Western Counties Regional Library; Bookmobile service began: April 20, 1970
• Branch opened: June 30, 1983

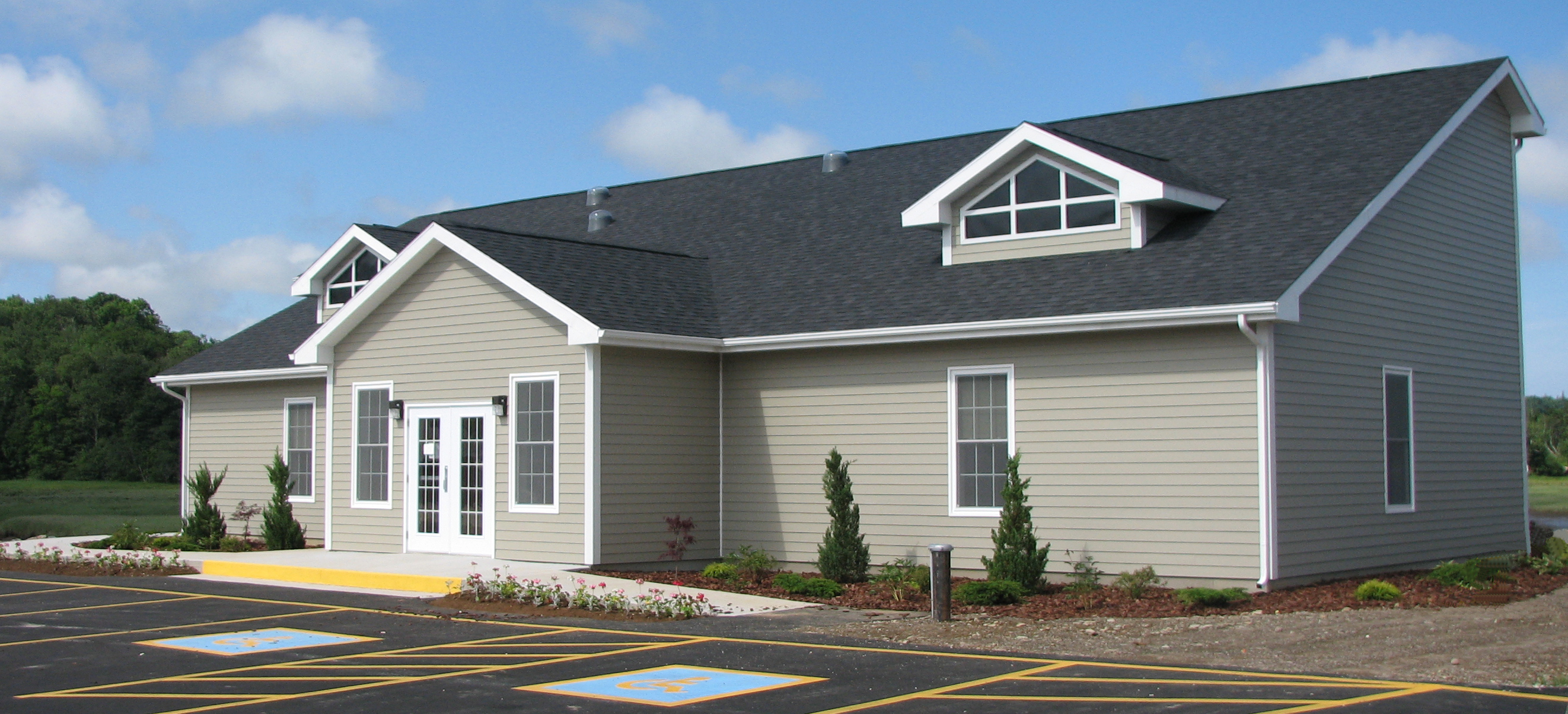
Weymouth Waterfront Library

Weymouth

• Joined Western Counties Regional Library: April 20, 1970
• Branch opened: May 10, 1982
• Branch relocated: July 29, 2010

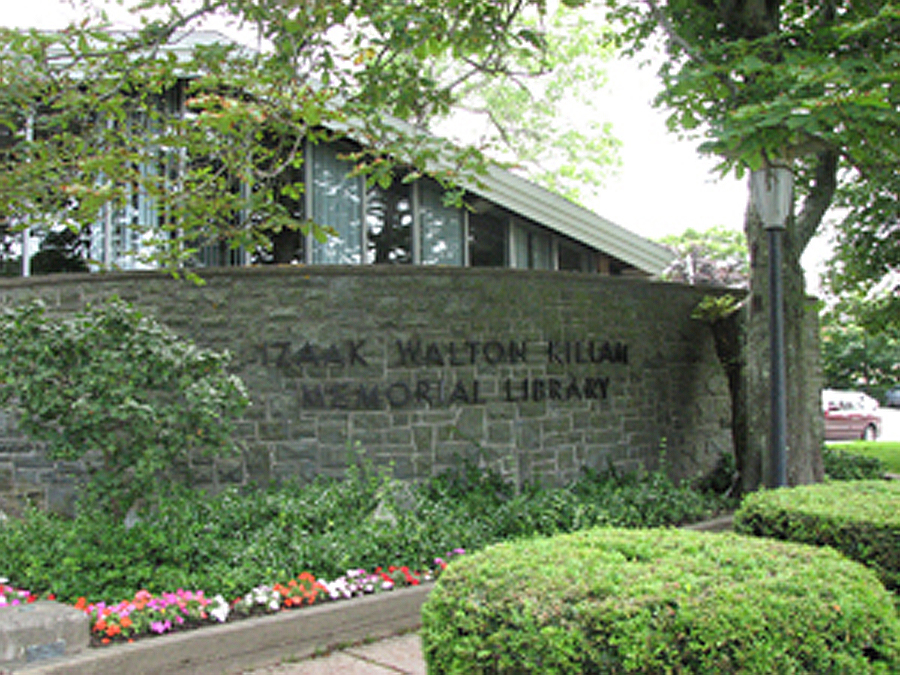
Izaak Walton Killam Memorial Library, Yarmouth

Yarmouth

• Joined Western Counties Regional Library: June 6, 1969
• Branch opened: October 29, 1969
• Branch expansion: June 22, 1991
