= Ontario Library Association =

Oldest continually operating library association in Canada

- Established: 1900; 126 years ago
- Type: Library association
- Location: Toronto, Ontario
- Board President: Lita Barrie
- Executive Director: Michelle Arbuckle
- Website: accessola.com

The Ontario Library Association (OLA) was established in 1900 and is the oldest continually operating library association in Canada. With over 4,000 members, OLA is also the largest library association in Canada and among the 10 largest library associations in North America.

The stated purpose of the OLA is to "give profile to the librarians, library workers and trustees in the school, college, university, public and special libraries of Ontario and to foster provincial programs that will improve library services in the institutions and communities our members serve and that will ensure equitable access to information for all citizens of the province."

== History ==
Founded in 1900, the OLA was formed after a meeting of the American Library Association held that same year in Montreal, where it was decided that a Canadian association was not currently practical. Between 2006 and 2013, the OLA's office was at 50 Wellington Street, Toronto, Ontario. In 2013, the OLA moved to 2 Toronto Street, then to Danforth Avenue in 2021, and to 192 Spadina Avenue in 2023. Since 2020, OLA has been a primarily remote organization with regular meetings occurring in the CSI Spadina boardrooms.

== Structure and leadership ==
The OLA has five councils:

- Ontario College and University Library Association (OCULA)
- Ontario Health Library and Information Association (OHLIA)
- Ontario Library Boards’ Association (OLBA)
- Ontario Public Library Association (OPLA)
- Ontario School Library Association (OSLA)

Each council is headed by a president and elected council, and past council presidents serve on the OLA board of directors. The board of directors also includes the Executive Director and the executive committee, composed of the president, vice -president, and treasurer.

== Affiliates ==
The OLA is affiliated with:

- Canadian Federation of Library Associations
- Ex Libris Association
- Library and Archives Canada Stakeholder Group
- Ontario Health Libraries Association
- The Partnership

== Events and programs ==
The OLA runs several programs, services, and events. Three of its most prominent are the Forest of Reading program, the Library Marketplace, and the OLA Super Conference.

=== Forest of Reading ===
OLA's Forest of Reading is Canada's largest recreational reading program, which has grown to ten reading programs since the early 1990s. More than 270,000 readers participate annually from their school and/or public libraries. The Forest award winners are chosen by votes cast by readers in the target age ranges for each of the specific book categories. Award winners are announced annually at the Forest of Reading Festival in Toronto.

The ten awards offered under the Forest of Reading umbrella are:

- Blue Spruce Award - ages 4–7 (junior kindergarten–grade 2), English, picture books
- Silver Birch Express Award - ages 8–10 (grades 3–4), English, fiction/non-fiction
- Silver Birch Fiction Award - ages 8–12 (grades 3–6 ), English, fiction
- Yellow Cedar Award - ages 9–14 (grades 4–8), English, non-fiction
- Red Maple Award - ages 12–14 (grades 7–8), English, fiction
- White Pine Award - high school (grades 9–12), English, fiction
- Le prix Peuplier - ages vary, French, picture books
- Le prix Mélèze (formerly Le prix Tamarac Express) - ages vary, short chapter books or advanced picture books, French, fiction/nonfiction
- Le prix Tamarac - ages vary, chapter books, French, fiction/nonfiction
- Evergreen Award - adult, fiction/non-fiction

=== OLA Super Conference ===
Begun in 1902 as the OLA's annual conference, the event was rebranded in 1995 as the Super Conference. Super Conference is the largest continuing education event in librarianship. The Super Conference also includes within it Canada's largest library trade show. The event is held annually in Toronto, Ontario.

== See also ==
- James Bain (librarian)
- Mary J. L. Black
- Leslie Weir
