= Library atmospherics =

Micro-level design of library common areas

Library atmospherics is the micro-level design of library common areas to create a desired emotional effect in library visitors.

== Purpose and practice ==
The practice of library atmospherics is the manipulation of a library's physical environment to provoke particular emotional responses in library users, typically to improve the experience of the library environment in order to secure and promote increased patronage of the library. The study of library atmospherics is a particularly important development for library marketing, influencing how library users view library services, collections, buildings, systems, and the broader role of the library in society.

=== Atmospheric variables in library design ===
Atmospheric variables include sight, sound, scent, and the general feel of both the exterior architecture and interior design of the library. Examples of these atmospheric variables within the library structure include colour schemes, acoustics, ventilation, lighting, electronic support, furniture, upholstery, and shelving fixtures. The exterior atmospherics of a library are just as important to the feel of entrance walkways, landscaping, and parking lots.

The value of considering library atmospherics has been demonstrated by the ways in which design variables influence patrons' experience approaching, entering, within, and exiting, the library. Jeffrey Scherer has indicated that lighting schemes, for example, influence perception, mood and even the outward behavior of library patrons.

Library atmospherics require designers to take into consideration that the more varied the patron population, the more complex the atmospheric decisions that need to be made. Libraries that provide services to a varied target audience can utilise the study of library atmospherics as a successful marketing tool, by considering and incorporating different atmospheric designs to encourage certain groups of library users to particular parts of the physical library environment. This kind of target-area marketing requires close integration with stock selection and management.

== Technological atmospheric variables ==
Some libraries offer public access to a range of electronic equipment, including public-access computers, fax machines, photocopiers, ATMs, and self-service checkout units. These technological variables create a need for varied environments within the library building in order to take account of different needs expressed by patrons – a silent-study area should not also house a group of photocopiers.

=== Noise criteria ===
Noise criteria (NC) translates complex acoustical characteristic into a single quantitative value.

NC level 35 is generally considered acceptable for most library functions, with NC level 40 acceptable in the busier areas (for comparison, NC 20–25 is considered acceptable for concert halls). NC values consider the background noise level traditionally heard from building systems including heating, air conditioning, ventilation, fan units and noise through windows. With increasing numbers of electrical equipment to be found in libraries, increasingly on unmediated public access, consideration of noise must be incorporated into the practice of library atmospherics.

=== Computers and lighting ===
The presence of computers in libraries has greatly impacted lighting issues within library environments. As the library becomes more reliant on information existing primarily or solely in digital form, it is increasingly important to understand the role played in library atmospherics by considered uniformity in comfort levels and by efficiency in use of lighting levels.

Generally speaking, when people are working on computers their eyes move from the screen, to the background and to adjacent visual attractions. Each time the eye moves, it adjusts to the new lighting level. If the degree of adaptation between visual tasks is too great, eye strain, fatigue and stress result. Similarly, a significant cause of eye strain for computer users is reflected light from poorly placed light fixtures on glass screens. Glare and brightness ratios provide guidelines for lighting schemes within libraries to minimise eye strain. Considering these ratios in balancing different light sources can be complicated considering a library's various uses, from computer-screen use and microfiche, to reading and browsing, but is important in creating a productive and safe library atmosphere for all patrons.

== See also ==
Lighting in libraries
