= Newark Circulation System =

Manual library circulation system

The Newark charging system, also called the Newark circulation system or Newark system, is a manual library circulation system used to record the loan and return of library materials. The system uses book cards, book pockets, borrower cards or registration numbers, date slips and charging trays to connect a borrowed item with the person who borrowed it.

The system was associated with the transition from ledger-based circulation records to card-based circulation control in libraries. It was described in a 2015 library-history timeline as having been invented about 1900 and widely adopted over older ledger and indicator systems. A 1913 summary of reports on charging systems published by the American Library Association listed the Newark system as the most common named system among the responding libraries.

== History ==
Before card-based charging systems, many libraries used ledger systems to record loans. In a simple ledger system, the identification of a book and the borrower were entered into a ledger when the item was loaned, and the return was later marked in the same record. More developed ledger systems used borrower numbers and patron files, reducing the need to write a borrower's full name for each transaction.

The Newark system incorporated separate records for borrowers, books and loan transactions. Maurice J. Freedman described the system in 1981 as incorporating features of earlier systems, including a separate registration file that gave alphabetical access by patron and numerical access by patron registration number. For item identification, each book had a book card and matching pocket carrying identifying information such as call number or author and title.

By 1981, Freedman described the Newark system, including mechanical and electromechanical versions such as Dickman, Gaylord and Demco systems, as the overwhelmingly prevalent circulation system in the United States. The Gaylord book charging machine, introduced in the early 1930s, automated part of the Newark book charging procedure.

== Operation ==
In the Newark system, each book contains a book pocket and a book card. When the book is on the shelf, the card remains in the pocket. When the book is borrowed, the card is removed and used as the library's record of the loan.

During checkout, library staff record the date of the transaction or due date and the borrower's number on the book card. The card is then filed in a tray, usually under the transaction date or due date and then by call number or shelf-list order. A date slip or due-date plate in the book shows the borrower when the item must be returned.

When a book is returned, staff use the date information and the book's call number to locate the book card in the circulation file. The card is removed from the tray and returned to the pocket in the book, completing the discharge of the item. In school library adaptations of the system, the basic materials were described as the book pocket, book card, dating slip and charging tray with date guides.

Borrower cards could also be used. In that form of the system, the borrower had a card that was brought to the library when drawing a book, and the card was stamped or marked as part of the loan record.

== Records and functions ==
The Newark system allowed libraries to maintain records of items on loan by combining several files. A registration file identified borrowers, book cards identified items, and the filed charging cards represented current loan transactions. Freedman wrote that the books on the shelves, combined with cards in charging trays, functioned as an inventory record because items were represented either by their physical presence on the shelf or by a card in the circulation file.

The system also supported overdue notices, renewals and reserves. Overdue items could be found by reviewing cards remaining in date trays after the allowed loan period. Renewals were handled by locating the charge card and recharging the book if no reserve had been placed on it. Reserves could be marked with a clip or other indicator on the circulation card.

== Limitations and later systems ==
The Newark system required manual filing and maintenance of paper records. Freedman noted that handwritten and typed Newark records were comprehensive but costly to obtain and maintain, and that the original system did not provide a full borrower-by-borrower list of the exact items charged to each user.

Later circulation systems modified or mechanized parts of the Newark model. Freedman described several later systems, including McBee key-sort cards and photo-charging systems, as variants or successors to the Newark system. Computerized circulation systems later allowed libraries to maintain item, borrower and transaction records in machine-readable form and to search those records by multiple access points.

== See also ==
- Integrated library system
- Library automation
- Library card
- Library circulation
- Library catalog
