= Reference scenario =

A reference scenario is an imagined situation where a library patron brings a question to a librarian and there is then a conversation, called in the field a reference interview, where the librarian works to help the patron find the information they want. These scenarios are used in training future librarians in how to help patrons. A scenario can be as short as a couple of sentence; it includes a question and a situation that underlies that question.

Scenarios focus the library student on the interaction with a patron. In class practice sessions, one student acts as the patron and the other as the librarian; the one practicing as the librarian shouldn't know the whole scenario in advance.

Scenarios are valued because often the question asked is not the end of the patron's information search, but the start. Patrons often start by voicing a question that they think the library can answer, rather than the question they are actually seeking to answer; or, they pose a question that the librarian doesn't understand. Reference librarian skills are about mediating a gap between what the patron wants and what the library can provide. This can involve the librarian making themselves a partner in the patron's search, showing them what the library has to offer, or sometimes just clarifying a confusing word.

== See also ==
- Reference work
- Library reference desk
