= List of types of lighting =

Lighting is the deliberate use of light to achieve a practical or aesthetic effect.

Types of lighting include:

- Christmas lighting
- Automotive lighting
  - Emergency vehicle lighting
  - Ground effects lighting
- Backlighting
- Bicycle lighting
- Bisexual lighting
- Cameo lighting
- Carbide lighting
- Celebratory lighting
- Computer graphics lighting
  - Image-based lighting
  - Per-pixel lighting
  - Per-vertex lighting
  - Unified lighting and shadowing
  - Volumetric lighting
- Cove lighting
- Electric lighting
- Emergency lighting
- Excessive lighting (light pollution)
- Fluorescent lighting
- Fusion lighting
- Gas lighting
- Incandescent lighting
- Landscape lighting
- Library lighting
- LED lamp lighting
- Medical lighting
- Mood lighting
- Photographic lighting
  - High-key lighting
  - Low-key lighting
  - Rembrandt lighting
- Runway lighting
- Security lighting
- Solar lighting
- Solid-state lighting
- Stage lighting
  - Intelligent lighting
  - LED stage lighting
- Street lighting
- Task lighting
- Track lighting
- Urban lighting

== See also ==
- Light (disambiguation)
- Lightning (disambiguation)
- List of light sources
