= Library circulation =

Book lending-related activity within libraries

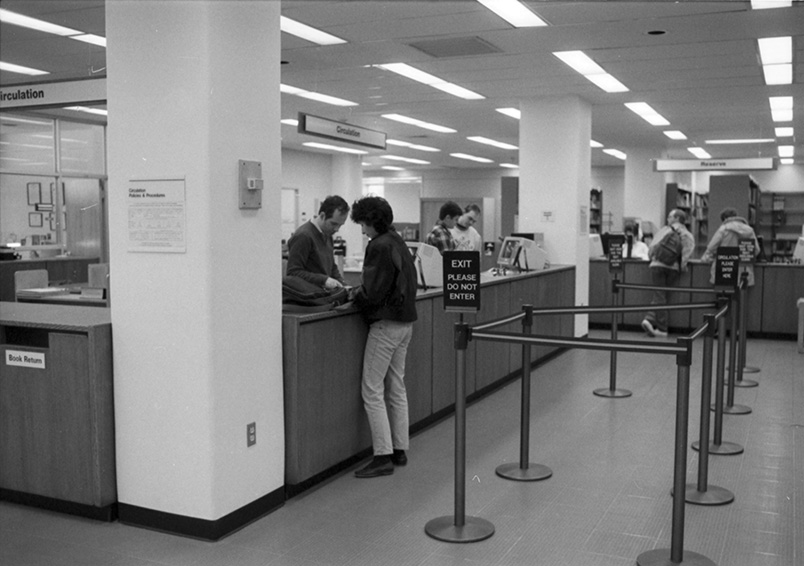
Circulation desk at the University of Texas at Arlington's Central Library

Library circulation or library lending comprises the activities around the lending of library books and other material to users of a lending library.

== Description ==
Library circulation or lending comprises the activities around the lending of library books and other material to users of a lending library. A circulation or lending department is one of the key departments of a library. The main public service point is the circulation desk or loans desk. Public service librarians look to the law to determine their legal obligations and potential liability relating to privacy of library use. The American Library Association affirms that all libraries are forums for information and ideas, and that their Library Bill of Rights should guide their service.

== Circulation or loans desk ==
The main public service point is the circulation desk or loans desk, usually found near the main entrance of a library. It provides lending services and facilities for return of loaned items. Renewal of materials and payment of fines are also handled at the circulation desk. Circulation staff may provide basic search and reference services, though more in-depth questions are usually referred to reference librarians at the library reference desk, but the services of both are occasionally combined. The circulation desk is in most cases staffed by library support staff instead of professional librarians.

=== Functions of circulation desk staff ===
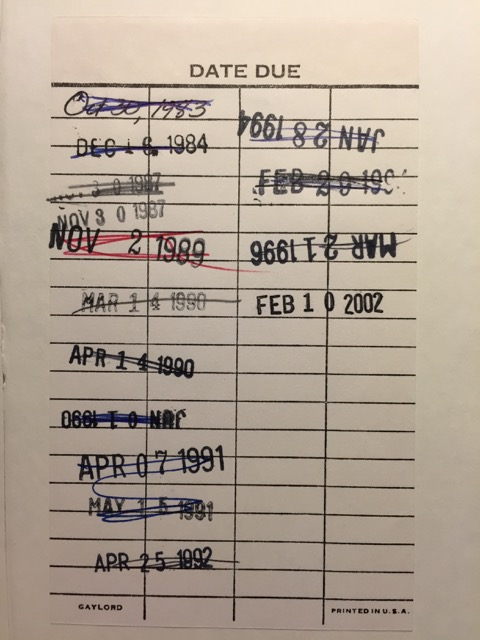
A date due slip showing checkout and return activity from 1983 to 2002

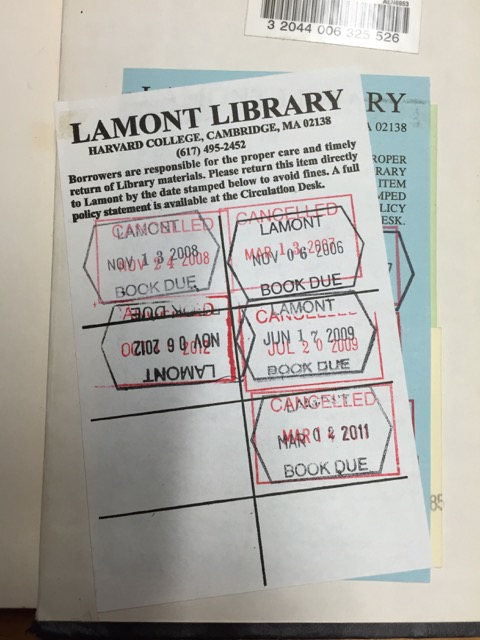
Date due slip from Harvard's Lamont Library

- Lending materials to library users
- Checking in materials returned
- Monitoring materials for damage and routing them to the appropriate staff for repair or replacement
- Troubleshooting circulation technology, i.e. library circulation software, scanners, printers, etc.
- Collecting statistics on library use, i.e. patron transactions, material checkouts, etc.
- Creation of borrowers pockets, i.e. when using the Browne Issue System
- Charging and receipting overdue fines.
- Send out overdue notices to borrower.
- Operating automated filing and recovery system and technology.
- Adapt to new software and equipment.
- Perform moderate physical work including the ability to carry, pull, and lift up to 30 pounds.
- Ability to conduct/reconcile financial reports.
- Communicate via telephone, email.
- Ability to see and read materials.
- Assist patrons at the circulation /reserve desk.
- Assist circulation supervisor with training student employee if it is an academic environment.
- Maintain the stacks by re-shelving materials in library by call number whether Dewey Decimal system or Library of Congress system.
- Resolve issues, such as inappropriate patron conduct, including but not limited to cell phone usages, open drink containers, and inappropriate noise levels

== Intellectual Freedom Committee ==
Public service librarians look to the law to determine their legal obligations and potential liability relating to privacy of library use. The potential liability or punishment for librarians, who fail to protect confidentiality of individual library use, is largely a matter of state law without record of prosecution or civil suit. Remedies for individuals whose information has been deliberately shared with or unknowingly collected by third parties vary widely and are sometimes unclear.

Established December 1, 1967, the Office for Intellectual Freedom is charged with implementing American Library Association (ALA) policies. Those policies concerning the concept of intellectual freedom as embodied in the Library Bill of Rights, the Association's basic policy on free access to libraries and library materials.

== Library Bill of Rights ==
The American Library Association affirms that all libraries are forums for information and ideas, and that the following basic policies (in their Library Bill of Rights) should guide their service

I. Books and other library resources should be provided for the interest, information, and enlightenment of all people of the community the library serves. Materials should not be excluded because of the origin, background, or views of those contributing to their creation.
II. Libraries should provide materials and information presenting all points of view on current and historical issues. Materials should not be proscribed or removed because of partisan or doctrinal disapproval.
III. Libraries should challenge censorship in the fulfillment of their responsibility to provide information and enlightenment.
IV. Libraries should cooperate with all persons and groups concerned with resisting abridgment of free expression and free access to ideas.
V. A person's right to use a library should not be denied or abridged because of origin, age, background, or views.
VI. Libraries which make exhibit spaces and meeting rooms available to the public they serve should make such facilities available on an equitable basis, regardless of the beliefs or affiliations of individuals or groups requesting their use.
VII. All people, regardless of origin, age, background, or views, possess a right to privacy and confidentiality in their library use. Libraries should advocate for, educate about, and protect people's privacy, safeguarding all library use data, including personally identifiable information.

Adopted June 19, 1939, by the ALA Council; amended October 14, 1944; June 18, 1948; February 2, 1961; June 27, 1967; January 23, 1980; January 29, 2019; inclusion of "age" reaffirmed January 23, 1996.

== See also ==
- Controlled digital lending
- Interlibrary loan
- Library reference desk
