= Library website =

A library website provides a library with a website to offer its services to its community.

== Services ==
Library websites can offer:

- Interaction with the library catalog. An Online Public Access Catalog (OPAC) provides the ability log into a library account to renew or request items.
- Gateway to electronic resources. Libraries may organize the various periodical indexes, electronic reference collections, and other databases they subscribe to. Resources may be organized alphabetically, by subject and by media.
- Library tutorials. Interactive tutorials can help users choose and use electronic resources, how to renew a book, and other library functions.
- Virtual reference. Virtual reference allows remote patrons to connect with library staff and have their questions answered, including via email and texting.
- Library blogs. Blogs can announce new resources or services at the library and to give patrons another venue to communicate with staff and provide feedback.

== Accessibility ==
In the United States, according to the Tech Act and AT Act of 1998, libraries as grant-funded institutions are bound by the Section 508 Amendment to the Rehabilitation Act of 1973 and must report the accessibility of their electronic and information technology. Therefore, library websites should be designed with web accessibility standards in mind.
