= Melissa Gross =

American biomechanist

Melissa Gross is an Arthur F. Thurnau Professor in the biomechanics field. She is currently an associate professor of Movement Science at the University of Michigan's School of Kinesiology and director of the Behavioural Biomechanics Laboratory. Gross is also an associate professor in the Stamps School of Art & Design. She has made contributions to behavioural biomechanics, musculoskeletal biomechanics, Kinesiology and active learning.

She has also been a member of the American Society of Biomechanics as a fellow and past president and throughout her career has received over US$1.5 million in grant funding.

== Biography ==
Gross completed her bachelor's degree in dance at the University of Colorado in 1976. In 1979, Gross then completed a master's degree in kinesiology at the University of California. Gross remained at there for her PhD in kinesiology (biomechanics), which she obtained in 1984.

== Research career ==
Melissa Gross is a scholar in kinesiology, biomechanics, and interprofessional education. She is a faculty member at the University of Michigan's School of Kinesiology and has made contributions to the study of human movement, with a focus on biomechanics, emotion, and motor control. Gross earned her Ph.D. in kinesiology from University of California in 1984 and has since held various research and academic positions, including her role as faculty director of the Women in Science and Engineering Unit at the University of Michigan.

Gross's research spans a variety of topics, including the biomechanical analysis of movement, the interplay between emotion and motor behavior, and educational innovation in anatomy and kinesiology. She has published in peer-reviewed journals, contributing to fields such as emotion-related gait analysis and the mechanics of human movement. Her work has been recognised with honours such as the Arthur F. Thurnau Professorship and a fellowship from the American Society of Biomechanics. Additionally, she has led several interdisciplinary grants, combining art and science to enhance teaching and learning experiences.

Gross has developed novel courses integrating technology with anatomy and biomechanics education, such as using motion capture for analysing expressive movements. She is a finalist in Baylor University's Robert Foster Cherry Award for Great Teaching.

== Awards ==
- In 1997, Gross was a Kinesiology Nominee for University of Michigan Henry Russel Teaching Award.
- In 1998, Computerworld Smithsonian Award Program Laureate for "Motion Analysis".
- In 2014, Gross received her Arthur F. Thurnau Professorship.
- In 2015–16, she received the DEI Academic Innovation Fellow and the Inter-professional Leadership Fellow at the University of Michigan.
- In 2016, Gross was a University of Michigan Provost's Teaching Innovation Prize Finalist for "Scaling Up Engaged Learning Using Blending Modular Courses with Shared Learning Goals
- In 2017, the Midwest Interprofessional Practice, Education & Research Center awarded Gross the Demonstration Model Award for "IPE Course Adaptor Toolkit."
- In 2019, Gross received the Kinesiology Teaching Excellence Award and the Midwest Interprofessional Practice, Education & Research Center honoured her with the Demonstration Model Award for "Foundations Experience Faculty Team."
- In 2020, the Michigan Center for Interprofessional Education (IPE) presented her with the Award for Innovation and Excellence for "101 Taskforce."
- In 2021, Gross received the Kinesiology Teaching Excellence Award.
- In 2022, IMS Global Learning Consortium awarded Gross with the Learning Impact Bronze Award for "Competency-Based Tracking for Interprofessional Education Leveraging Institutional Data."
