= Reference interview =

Clarifying a library user's request

A reference interview is a conversation between a librarian and a library user, usually at a reference desk, in which the librarian responds to the user's initial explanation of their information need by first attempting to clarify that need and then by directing the user to appropriate information resources.

== Definition ==
Bopp & Smith (1995) define the reference interview as the "conversation between a member of the library reference staff and a library user for the purpose of clarifying the user’s needs and aiding the user in meeting those needs."

According to the Online Dictionary for Library and Information Science, a reference interview is "the interpersonal communication that occurs between a reference librarian and a library user to determine the person's specific information need(s), which may turn out to be different from the reference question as initially posed."

Stephen Abram uses the concept of "the library as conversation," and says that when it comes to reference questions, "[librarians'] core skills are the skills and competencies required to improve the quality of the question."

== Stages ==
The reference interview is structured to help a librarian provide answers to a library user. In general, the interview is composed of the following stages:

1. Welcoming
2. Gathering general information and an overview of the problem
3. Confirming the exact question
4. Intervention, such as giving information, advice, or instructions
5. Finishing, including feedback and summary

These stages may occur in loops; for example when a clarification of the question leads to the need to establish more background information on the query topic. These steps are designed to put the user at ease and help ensure that they have correctly explained what they require. When the reference librarian believes that the query is fully understood, they attempt to provide resources to help satisfy it. The important but often overlooked final step is checking that the information or service provided was indeed what the library user required.

== Techniques ==
The purpose behind the reference interview structure is to ensure that the library user's information need is satisfied. The librarian can use a number of interview techniques to help identify the user's exact need. Poor reference interview skills may lead to misinterpretation of the real question, a lack of real help, and/or an unsatisfied library user.

Librarians use many techniques to help identify a user's information need. With body language, repetition, and paraphrasing of what the user says, the interviewer can encourage the user to give more information about what they need. Asking open questions establishes context and helps to identify exactly what is required. A lack of follow-up, checking that the user found what they required, is one of the common mistakes made in the reference interview.

== Query formation ==
One of the biggest problems with providing effective reference services is badly formed queries. In these instances, the user's reference question doesn't match up to the information they actually need. Badly formed queries may lead to user frustration, as they perceive that the reference interview is not solving their problem.

Many of the techniques used in the reference interview are geared towards developing a query until a sense of the user's true information need is gained. The librarian typically has little insight into the social and psychological barriers that might be preventing the user from explaining their question accurately, and so must take care when developing it.

== Digital reference ==
Digital reference is a reference service initiated electronically, often in real-time. The initial meeting between a patron and librarian is not face-to-face, though queries mutate and may later take place at a physical reference desk. Virtual reference services can be conducted via internet chat, videoconferencing, email, cobrowsing, and instant messaging. Unlike the in-person reference interview, digital reference might be an asynchronous pursuit.

Initial uptake of virtual reference services was not as swift as some had predicted. The complexity of virtual reference may have partly been to blame, as users want information quickly and with minimal effort. Some evidence suggests that the problem lies with poor uptake and training among library staff.

== Library users ==
Library users are not always comfortable using reference services or satisfied with them when used. Unobtrusive user studies suggest that only around 55% to 65% of users leave a reference interview satisfied with the result and willing to return. Demographics, social factors, and preconceptions about libraries all contribute to this figure. Embarrassment, shyness, and anxiety can prevent a user from approaching the reference desk, and poor signposting and explanation of services can mean that some customers aren't aware that the reference service exists. To be as effective as possible, libraries are encouraged to be proactive in publicizing their services and reducing the stigma of asking for help.

== Usefulness ==
Some researchers question the validity of the reference interview and the investment that a reference librarian represents. Others argue that reference services should broaden their target audience. As people increasingly use the internet to make major, life-affecting decisions, they might also require the services of professionals who are able to provide help in this environment. In the age of information overload, a successful reference interview may empower users to confidently make such decisions in their lives.

== See also ==
- Five whys
- Information behavior
- Reference desk
- Reference scenario
- XY problem

== Citations ==
- Bopp, Richard E.; Smith, Linda C. (1995). Reference and Information Services: An Introduction (second ed.). Englewood, Colorado: Libraries Unlimited.
- Childers, T. (1978). The Effectiveness of Information Service in Public Libraries: Suffolk County: Final Report. Philadelphia, PA: Drexel University, School of Library, and Information Science.
- Fields, A. (2006). "Ill-structured Problems and the Reference Consultation: The Librarian's Role in Developing Student Expertise". Reference Services Review. 34 (3). doi:10.1108/00907320610701554. hdl:1811/48344.
- Janes, J. (2003). "What is reference for?". Reference Services Review. 31 (1): 22–25. doi:10.1108/00907320310460852.
- Murphy, S (2005). "The Reference Narrative". Reference & User Services Quarterly. 44 (3).
- Nilsen, K (2005). Virtual versus Face-to-Face Reference: Comparing Users' Perspectives on Visits to Physical and Virtual Reference Desks in Public and Academic Libraries. World Library and Information Congress: 71st IFLA General Conference and Council, IFLA.
- Reitz, Joan M., ed. (2014). "Reference interview". ODLIS - Online Dictionary for Library and Information Science.
- Robinson, R; Reid, P (2007). "Do academic enquiry services scare students?". Reference Services Review. 35 (3): 405–424. doi:10.1108/00907320710774283. hdl:10059/363.
- Ross, C.; Nilsen, K.; Dewdney, P. (2002). Conducting the Reference Interview: A How-To-Do-It Manual for Librarians. London: Facet Publishing.
- Ross, S. R (2009). Why bother with a reference interview?. London: London, Facet. pp. 1–37.
- Ryan, S. (2008). "Reference Transactions Analysis: The Cost-effectiveness of Staffing a Traditional Academic Reference Desk". The Journal of Academic Librarianship. 34 (5): 389–399. doi:10.1016/j.acalib.2008.06.002.
- Stormont, S. (2007). "Looking to Connect: Technical Challenges that Impede the Growth of Virtual Reference". Reference & User Services Quarterly. 47 (2).
