= Reference desk =

Public service counter in a library

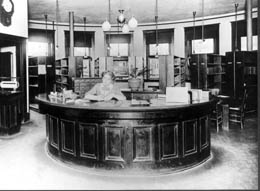
Librarian, Ballard Carnegie Library, Seattle, Washington c. 1907

The reference desk or information desk of a library is a public service counter where professional librarians provide library users with direction to library materials, advice on library collections and services, and expertise on multiple kinds of information from multiple sources.

== Purpose and usage ==
Library users can consult the staff at the reference desk for help in finding information. Using a structured reference interview, the librarian works with the library user to clarify their needs and determine what information sources will fill them.

The ultimate help provided may consist of reading material in the form of a book or journal article, instruction in the use of specific searchable information resources such as the library's online catalog, or subscription bibliographic/full text databases, or simply factual information drawn from the library's print or online reference collection. Information is also provided to patrons through electronic resources. Typically, a reference desk can be consulted either in person, by telephone, through email or online chat, although a library user may be asked to come to the library in person for help with more involved research questions. A staffed and knowledgeable reference desk is an essential part of a library.

The services that are provided at a reference desk may vary depending on the type of library, its purpose, its resources, and its staff. The services of circulation and reference desks are also sometimes combined.

== History ==
Reference services did not become commonplace in libraries until the late 1800s. These services initially began in public libraries. At first librarians were hesitant to offer reference services because many libraries did not have a large enough staff to provide the services without other duties being neglected. Beginning in 1883 with the Boston Public Library, libraries began to hire librarians whose primary duty was to provide reference services.

One of the earliest proponents of references services was Samuel Swett Green. He wrote an article titled "Personal Relations Between Librarians and Readers" which had a large impact on the future of reference services. Utor (2008) defined reference services as a direct personal assistance to readers seeking information through direct contact between the reference librarian and the user.

Reference desks changed dramatically with the emergence of information technology. During the 2020 pandemic, there was a surge of virtual information desks. It has been found that chat, email, and web conferencing formats have become adequate substitutions for in-person conversations. AI chatbots are also being used in academic libraries to address typical information inquiries, although their use is still being tested.

== Resources ==
Resources that are often kept at a library reference desk may include:

- A computer with internet access. Librarians use both the public web and subscription databases to find and evaluate information and research sources.
- A small collection of reference books (called ready reference) that are most often used, so that the librarians can reach them quickly, especially when they are on the phone, and so that the books will be returned in time for someone else to use later the same day. The library's full reference collection is usually nearby as well.
- Newspaper clipping files and other rare or restricted items that must be returned to the reference desk.
- Index cards with the answers to frequently asked questions, and/or drawers with folders of pamphlets and photocopies of pages that, from previous experience, were difficult to find. These enable librarians to find such information quickly without leaving the desk—even faster than they could look it up in a reference book or using the Internet.
- Books and other items that are being held for library users who asked the librarian by phone to set them aside for them to pick up later the same day, or within the next few days.
- Books from the circulating collection that have been set aside for students working on a special assignment, and are temporarily designated to be used only within the library until the project is due.
- Printed lists of items in the library that are not in the catalogue, such as newspapers, school yearbooks, old telephone directories, college course catalogues, and local history sources.

== Services ==
Services that are often available at a library reference desk include:

- A sign-up sheet for reserving computers with Internet access, or word processing software.
- The ability to place the book 'on hold', which prevents the person who has borrowed it from renewing it. The person who placed the 'hold' is notified when the book has been returned. (Some libraries provide this service at the circulation desk.)
- The ability to request interlibrary loan of books and other material from other branch libraries in the same library system, or from a cooperating library anywhere in the world. (Some libraries provide this service at the circulation desk.)
- The opportunity to recommend that the library purchase something for its collection that it does not have, which may be needed or of interest to other library users.

The librarian who staffs the reference desk can usually do the following by virtue of their professional training and experience:

- The librarian can look up a brief, factual answer to a specific question.
- The librarian can use the catalogue to find out whether the library owns an item with a particular title or author, or that contains a short story, chapter, song, or poem with a particular title, or to compile a list of books by a particular author or on a particular subject.
- The librarian can briefly teach the user how to use the catalogue and how to use its advanced features, or recommend the proper subject words or terms that are used in the catalogue for the topic the user has in mind.
- The librarian can often take the library user directly to the shelves with books on a certain topic without using the catalogue.
- The librarian is familiar with the contents of hundreds of reference books, and can recommend books that might contain the answer to a particular question.
- The librarian can teach the library user to use online databases such as for magazine and newspaper articles, and recommend words and search strategies for the topic the user has in mind.
- The librarian can recommend reliable web sites, give advice on searching the Internet for information, and evaluate the reliability of the information on web sites.
- If the library does not have information on a given topic, or if the library user wants more information, the librarian can refer the library user to another library or to an organization that can be contacted by phone or mail.
- Offer aid with devices such as tablets and e-readers. This can range from general assistance with questions on how to navigate e-reader and tablet devices to instructing classes. Questions can vary from what devices are compatible with the library's e-book platform, how to check out books, and how to read electronic books.

== Staff qualifications ==
In the United States, those who staff library reference desks are usually required to have a master's degree in library science from a program accredited by the American Library Association.

Academic librarians working at reference desks will often have a second graduate degree in a specific subject discipline.

In Sri Lanka, librarians at reference desks typically have master's degrees from the Sri Lankan Library Association's accredited programs.

== Electronic reference services ==
With the development of the Web, digital reference services are beginning to take over some of the roles of the traditional reference desk in a library. There is disagreement over whether or not this development is desirable or inevitable.

== See also ==
- Internet search engines and libraries
- Reference scenario
- Current awareness service
