= Anthony Onwuegbuzie =

British-American psychologist (born 1962)

Anthony J. Onwuegbuzie
- Born: 1962 (age 63–64); London, England
- Education: University of South Carolina
- Known for: Mixed methods research
- Awards: AERA Stress and Coping Special Interest Group's Distinguished Scholar Award; Silver Jubilee from Kathmandu University (2016)
- Scientific career
- Fields: Educational psychology Educational research
- Workplaces: Sam Houston State University; University of Cambridge
- Thesis: The interaction of statistics, test anxiety and examination condition in statistics achievement of post-baccalaureate non-statistics major (1993)

Anthony John Onwuegbuzie is a British-American educational psychologist who is a senior research associate at the University of Cambridge's Research for Equitable Access and Learning (REAL) Centre. He was formerly professor in the Department of Educational Leadership and Counseling at Sam Houston State University. As of 2016, he was the president of the Mixed Methods International Research Association.

== Previous positions ==
In 2003, he was appointed an associate professor in the Department of Educational Measurement and Research at the University of South Florida. He later became a full professor there. From 2007 to 2009, he was the editor of the Research & News section of the academic journal Educational Researcher.
