= School of Kinesiology =

Physical education school of the University of Michigan in Ann Arbor, Michigan

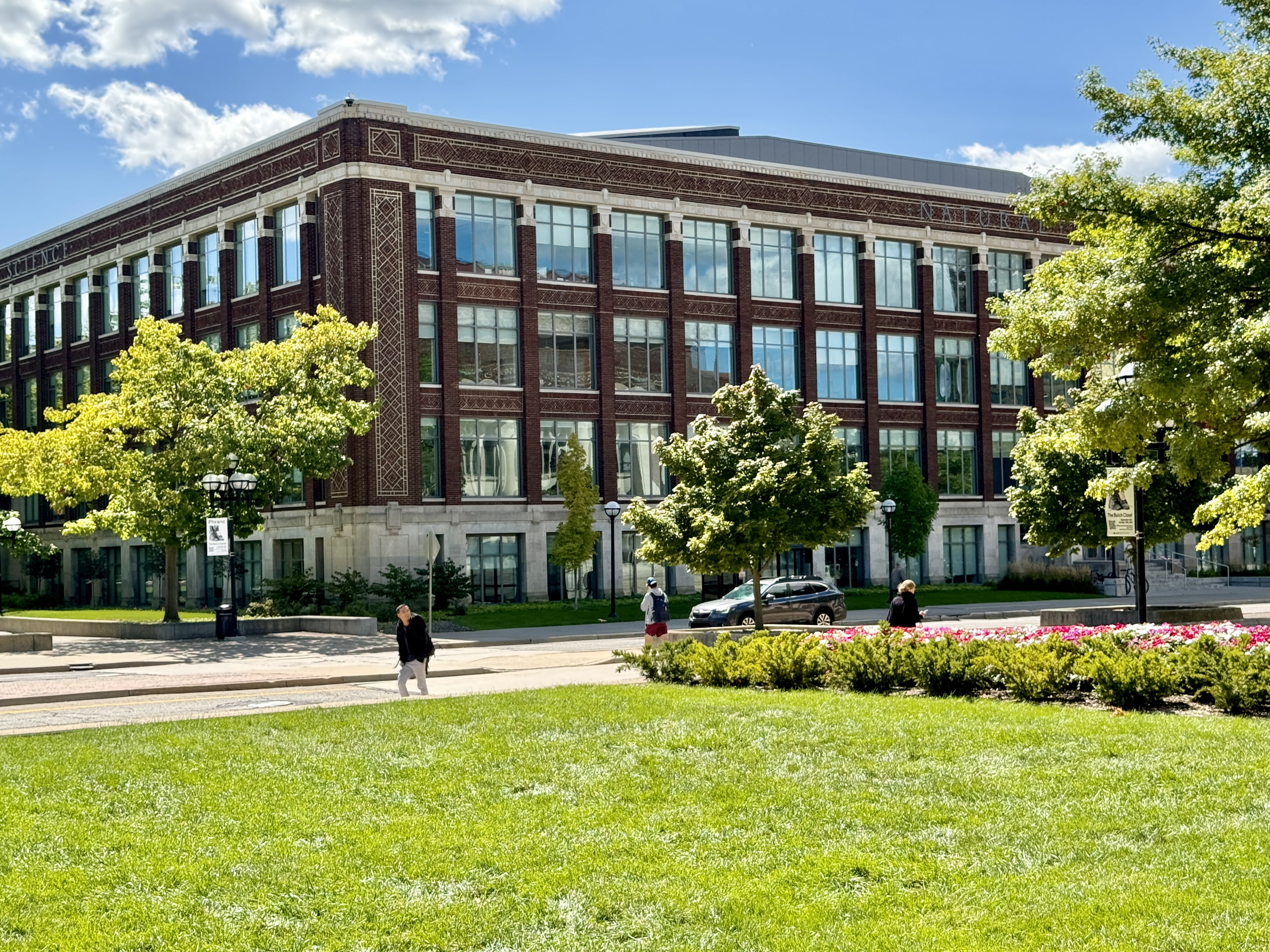
- Former names: Department of Physical Education (1921–1990); Division of Kinesiology (1990–2008)
- Type: Public
- Established: 1921; 105 years ago
- Parent institution: University of Michigan
- Dean: Lori Ploutz-Snyder
- Academic staff: 55
- Students: 1,073
- Location: Ann Arbor, Michigan, United States; 42.2781°N 83.7390°W
- Campus: University of Michigan Central Campus
- Website: kines.umich.edu

The School of Kinesiology is the school of physical education and sport studies at the University of Michigan, a public research university in Ann Arbor, Michigan. Established in 1921 as the Department of Physical Education, the unit became the independent Division of Kinesiology in 1990 and was constructed as the School of Kinesiology in 2008.

== Academics ==
The school focuses on the scientific study of human movement and how physical activity and sport affect our quality of life, community, and society at large. The school offers three undergraduate degrees in Applied Exercise Science, Movement Science, and Sport Management; three master's degrees in Athletic Training, Movement Science, and Sport Management; and two doctoral degrees in Movement Science and Sport Management. It also offers an Intraoperative Neuromonitoring concentration option for Movement Science undergraduates. In 2020, the PhD program was ranked #1 by the National Academy of Kinesiology. In 2024, the Sport Management program was ranked #2 in the United States.

The School of Kinesiology houses 24 research centers and laboratories that focus on injury prevention and rehabilitation; movement for health and well-being; childhood physical activity and development; community impact; and the business of sport. School faculty also lead several university-wide initiatives, including the Exercise & Sport Science Initiative (ESSI) and the Michigan Concussion Center.

== Student Groups ==
The School of Kinesiology is home to 20 student organizations from all three majors. Student groups work towards a mission established by the group, such as professional development or community betterment.

There are seven sport management focused groups. The Michigan Sport Business Conference (MSBC) was ranked the #1 U.S. sports business conference by Forbes. During the 2023 conference notable sport business professionals gathered the School of Kinesiology to discuss a range of topics. Some of the notable speakers consist of ESPN's Stephen A. Smith, Fox Sports President Mark Silverman, and NWSL Commissioner Jessica Berman. The six other sport management organizations consist of the Michigan Sport Business Inclusion Community (MSBIC), Michigan Sport Consulting Group (MSCG), Michigan Sport Venture Group (MSVG), Michigan Sports Analytics Society (MSAS), Michigan Women Empowerment in Sport and Entertainment (MWESE) and the Sport Business Association (SBA).

== Public Programs ==
The School of Kinesiology also houses Kinesiology Community Programs, which offers activity classes, KidSport Summer Camps, KidSport Clinics, Lifetime Fitness, and an annual Health & Fitness Workshop.
