= Lighting in libraries =

The issue of lighting in libraries is one that is still discussed and debated today. Well-designed and carefully positioned lighting makes patrons feel good and comfortable in their surroundings; bad lighting creates problems for patrons when they are reading, studying or searching for books and may keep their visit to the library short. Lighting can even have a negative impact on library staff too. If poor lighting harms the ability of the staff to function, which can happen if lighting creates glare and heavy shadows, the library is likely to be unpopular. A library with insufficient or poorly designed lighting is far from welcoming.

== History ==
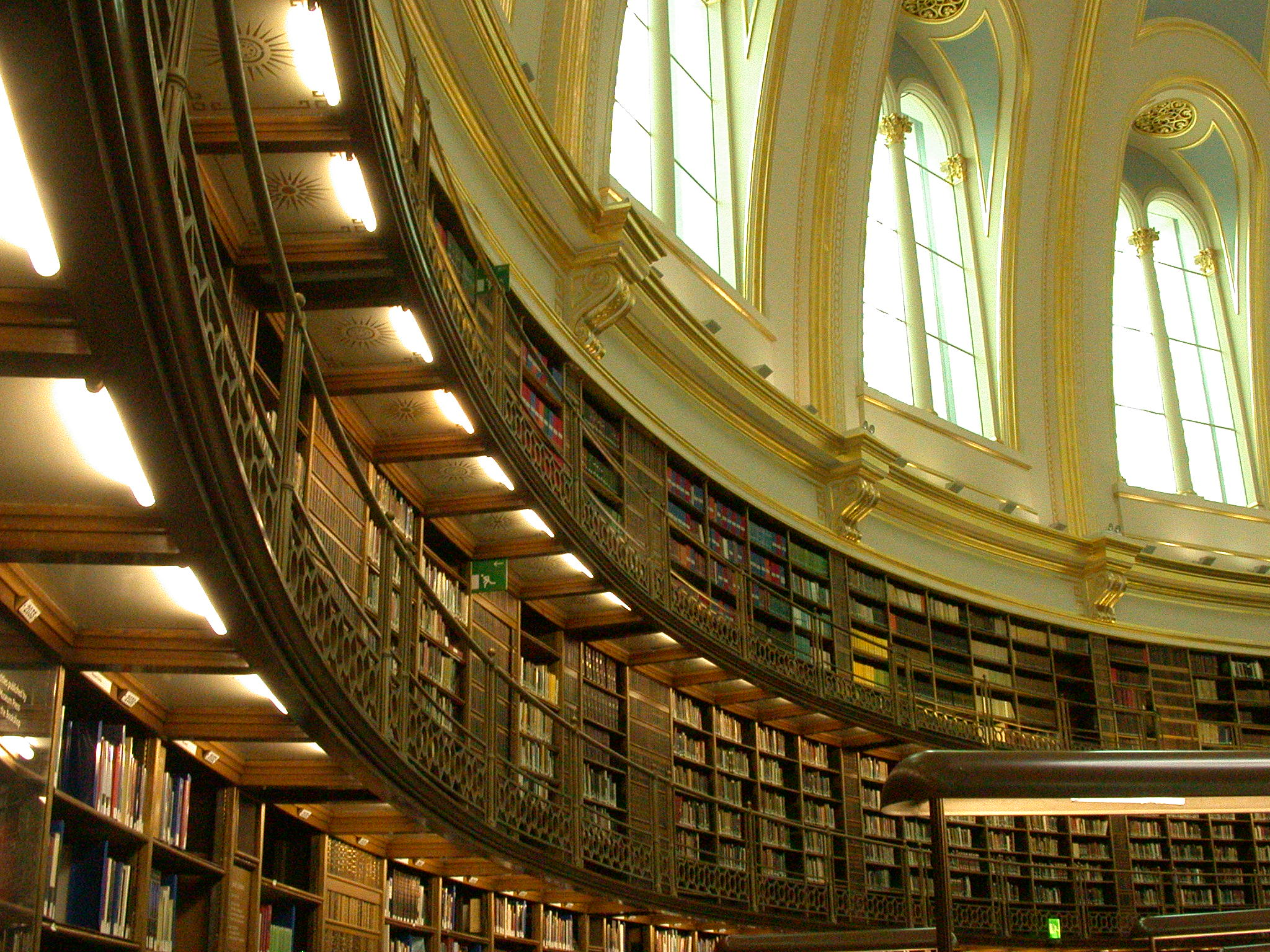
Day- and artificial lighting in the reading room of the British Museum

The coming of the electric light into society had a huge impact as well. Electric lighting has not always been around, and libraries had to function without it. The dawning of the electric light caused a huge impact in the library itself. This 19th-century innovation changed the library, and other public places, from relying on natural light, to a technology that could work no matter what time of day.

Before the electric light, the library was so dependent on daylight that the sun determined its operating hours. Other technologies before the electric light were too unstable; open flamed lighting was just too risky because of the fire implications. Books could not be near open flames, since one accident could destroy the whole building, and its collection.

There was gaslight technology available, though, before electricity came around. It created light in dark spaces, but it was not a stable source. The issue of carbon dioxide poisoning, since its light was fed by natural gas to keep it running, was a huge problem. The issue of intoxication by gas, and the instability of the gas (which could result in explosions), led to the popularization of electricity.

With the electric light, all of these problems discussed above were gone. There was no issue of death by explosion, as with the gaslight, and no more dependence on just natural light. Now, the library could be open at any hour, which created more access to information for the patrons.

In an interesting twist, the 19th century is now having problems adjusting to this new technology that was created. With books produced in the 19th century, they are the most susceptible to electric lighting. Books were in high demand, during the 19th century, so to keep up with the desire of people, manufactures turned to cheap ways to increase outputs of books. This cheap process is now failing under the pressure of modern lights, which can be traced back to the invention that changed libraries in the 19th century.

== See also ==
- Library Atmospherics
