= Library =

Collection of books, materials and media

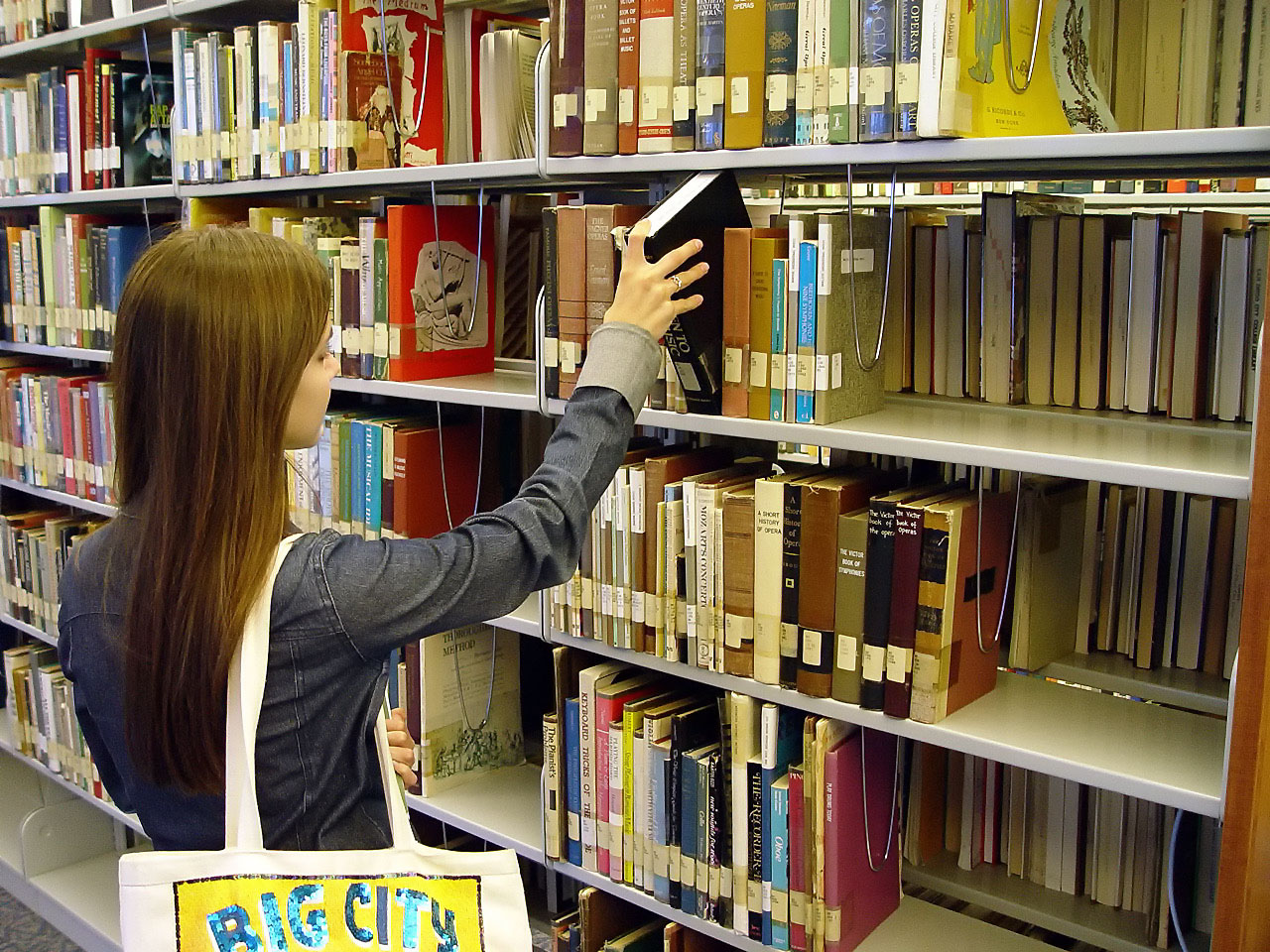
A library patron retrieving a book from a shelf at a library

A library is a collection of books, and possibly other materials and media, that is accessible for use by its members and members of allied institutions. Libraries provide physical (hard copies) or digital (soft copies) materials, and may be a physical location, a virtual space, or both. A library's collection normally includes printed materials which can be borrowed, and usually also includes a reference section of publications which may only be utilized inside the premises. Resources such as commercial releases of films, television programmes, other video recordings, radio, music and audio recordings may be available in many formats. These include DVDs, Blu-rays, CDs, cassettes, or other applicable formats such as microform. They may also provide access to information, music or other content held on bibliographic databases. In addition, some libraries offer creation stations for makers which offer access to a 3D printing station with a 3D scanner.

Libraries can vary widely in size and may be organised and maintained by a public body such as a government, an institution (such as a school or museum), a corporation, or a private individual. In addition to providing materials, libraries also provide the services of librarians who are trained experts in finding, selecting, circulating and organising information while interpreting information needs and navigating and analysing large amounts of information with a variety of resources. The area of study is known as library and information science or studies.

Library buildings often provide quiet areas for studying, as well as common areas for group study and collaboration, and may provide public facilities for access to their electronic resources, such as computers and access to the Internet.

The library's clientele and general services offered vary depending on its type, size and sometimes location: users of a public library have different needs from those of a special library or academic library, for example. Libraries may also be community hubs, where programmes are made available and people engage in lifelong learning. Modern libraries extend their services beyond the physical walls of the building by providing material accessible by electronic means, including from home via the Internet.

The services that libraries offer are variously described as library services, information services, or the combination "library and information services", although different institutions and sources define such terminology differently.

== Etymology ==
The term library is based on the Latin word liber for 'book' or 'document', contained in Latin libraria 'collection of books' and librarium 'container for books'. Other modern languages use derivations from Ancient Greek βιβλιοθήκη (bibliothēkē), originally meaning 'book container', via Latin bibliotheca (cf. French bibliothèque or German Bibliothek).

== History ==
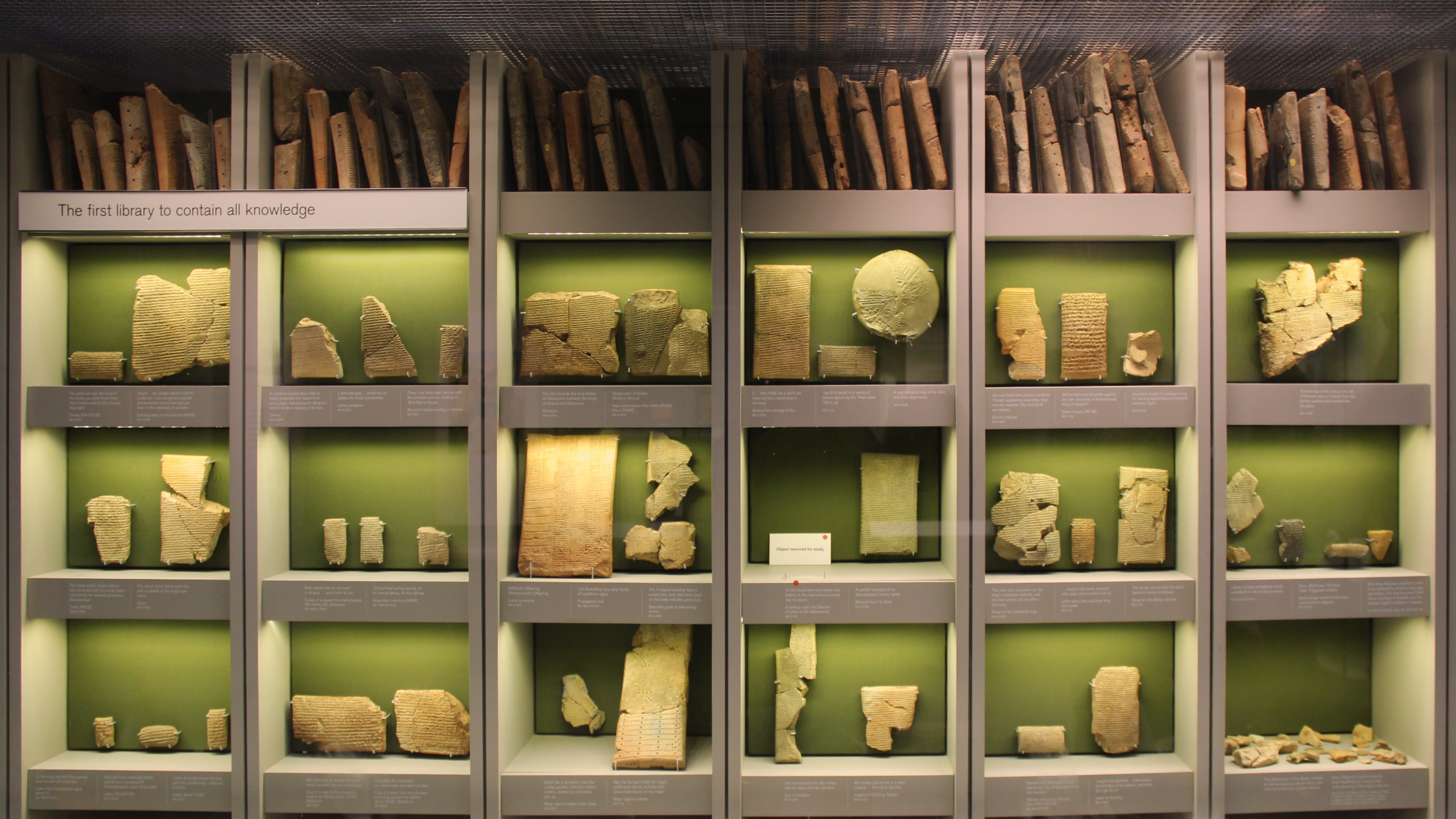
Library of Ashurbanipal in Mesopotamia, c. 1500–539 BC.

The history of libraries began with the first efforts to organize collections of documents. The first libraries consisted of archives of the earliest form of writing—the clay tablets in cuneiform script discovered in Sumer, some dating back to 2600 BC. Private or personal libraries made up of written books appeared in classical Greece in the 5th century BC. In the 6th century, at the very close of the Classical period, the great libraries of the Mediterranean world remained those of Constantinople and Alexandria.

The Fatimids (r. 909–1171) also possessed many great libraries within their domains. The historian Ibn Abi Tayyi’ describes their palace library, which probably contained the largest collection of literature on earth at the time, as a "wonder of the world". Throughout history, along with bloody massacres, the destruction of libraries has been critical for conquerors who wish to destroy every trace of the vanquished community's recorded memory. A prominent example of this can be found in the Mongol massacre of the Nizaris at Alamut in 1256 and the torching of their library, "the fame of which", boasts the conqueror Juwayni, "had spread throughout the world".

The libraries of Timbuktu were established in the fourteenth century and attracted scholars from all over the world.

The oldest modern public library was the Załuski Library (Polish: Biblioteka Załuskich, Latin: Bibliotheca Zalusciana) established in 1732 in Warsaw, Poland-Lithuania, which ultimately evolved into the National Library of Poland.

== Functions ==
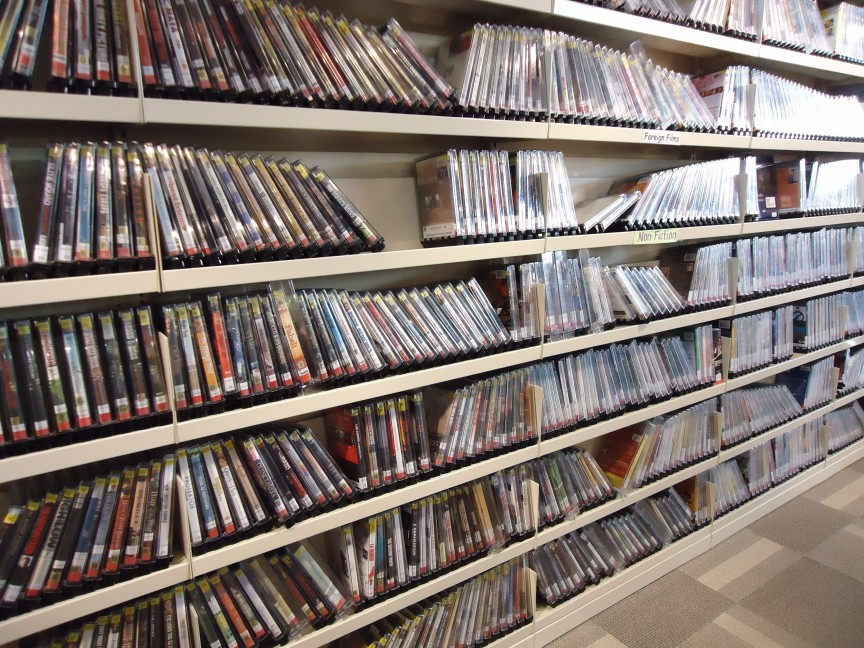
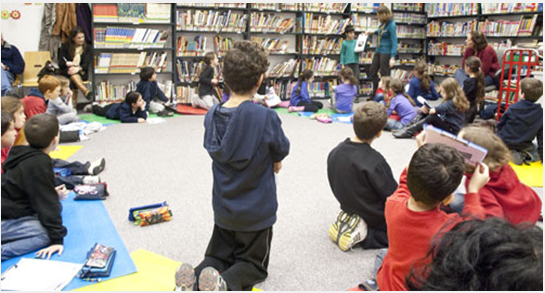
1. DVD collection at library; 2. Reading activity at the library

Libraries may provide physical or digital access to material, and may be a physical location, virtual space, or both (hybrid). A library's collection can include books, periodicals, newspapers, manuscripts, films, maps, prints, documents, microform, CDs, cassettes, videotapes, DVDs, Blu-ray Discs, e-books, audiobooks, databases, table games, video games, and other formats. Libraries range widely in size, up to millions of items.

Libraries often provide quiet spaces for private studying, common areas to facilitate group study and collaboration, and public facilities for access to their electronic resources and the Internet. Public and institutional collections and services may be intended for use by people who choose not to—or cannot afford to—purchase an extensive collection themselves, who need material no individual can reasonably be expected to have, or who require professional assistance with their research.

Services offered by a library are variously described as library services, information services, or the combination "library and information services", although different institutions and sources define such terminology differently. Organizations or departments are often called by one of these names.

=== Internal organization ===
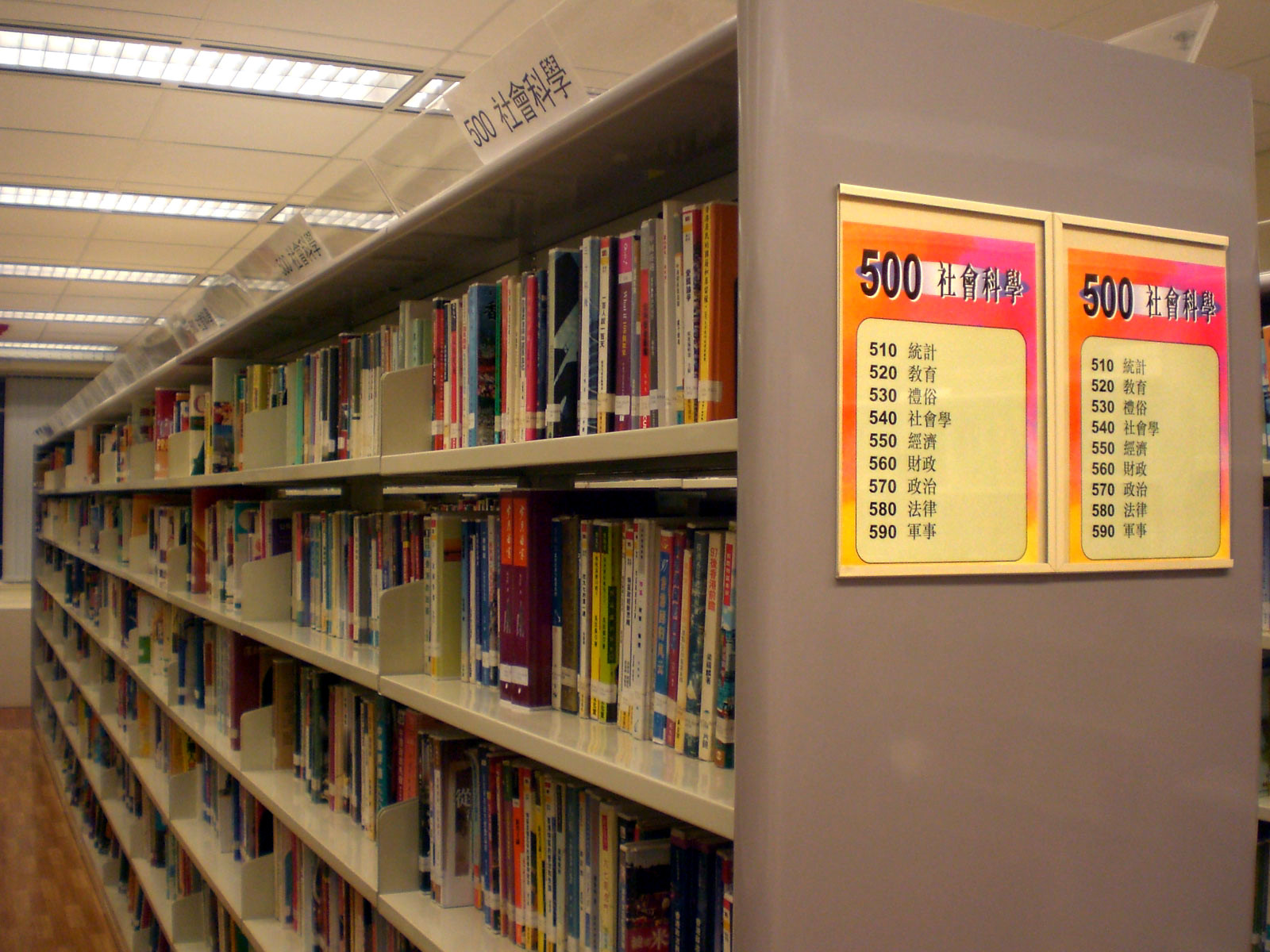
Library shelves in Hong Kong, showing numbers of the classification scheme to help readers locate works in that section

Most libraries have materials arranged in a specified order according to a library classification system, so that items may be located quickly and collections browsed efficiently. Some libraries have additional galleries beyond the public ones, where "reference" materials are stored. These reference stacks may be open to selected members of the public while others may require patrons to submit a "stack request" – a request for an assistant to retrieve the material from the closed stacks: see List of closed stack libraries.

Larger libraries are often divided into departments staffed by both paraprofessionals and professional librarians. Their department names and occupational designations may change depending on their location and the needs of the library.

- Circulation (or Access Services/Stacks Maintenance) – Handles user accounts and the loaning/returning and shelving of materials.
- Collection Development – Orders materials and maintains materials budgets.
- Reference – Staffs a reference desk answering questions from users (using structured reference interviews), instructing users, and developing library programming. Reference may be further broken down by user groups or materials; common collections are children's literature, young adult literature, and genealogy materials.
- Electronic Library – Responsible for providing information to users via electronic means.
- Technical Services – Works behind the scenes cataloging and processing new materials and deaccessioning weeded materials.

Basic tasks in library management include planning acquisitions (which materials the library should acquire, by purchase or otherwise), classifying and preserving items (especially rare and fragile archival materials such as manuscripts), deaccessioning materials, patron borrowing, and developing and administering library computer systems and technology. More long-term issues include planning the construction of new libraries or extensions to existing ones, and the development and implementation of outreach services and reading-enhancement services (such as adult literacy and children's programming). Library materials like books, magazines, periodicals, CDs, etc. are managed using a library classification system such as the Dewey Decimal Classification Theory, though libraries will usually adjust their classification system to fit their needs. The International Organization for Standardization (ISO) has published several standards regarding the management of libraries through its Technical Committee 46 (TC 46), which is focused on "libraries, documentation and information centers, publishing, archives, records management, museum documentation, indexing and abstracting services, and information science". The following is a partial list of some of them:

- ISO 2789:2006 Information and documentation—International library statistics
- ISO 11620:1998 Information and documentation—Library performance indicators
- ISO 11799:2003 Information and documentation—Document storage requirements for archive and library materials
- ISO 14416:2003 Information and documentation—Requirements for binding of books, periodicals, serials, and other paper documents for archive and library use—Methods and materials
- ISO/TR 20983:2003 Information and documentation—Performance indicators for electronic library services

=== Usage ===
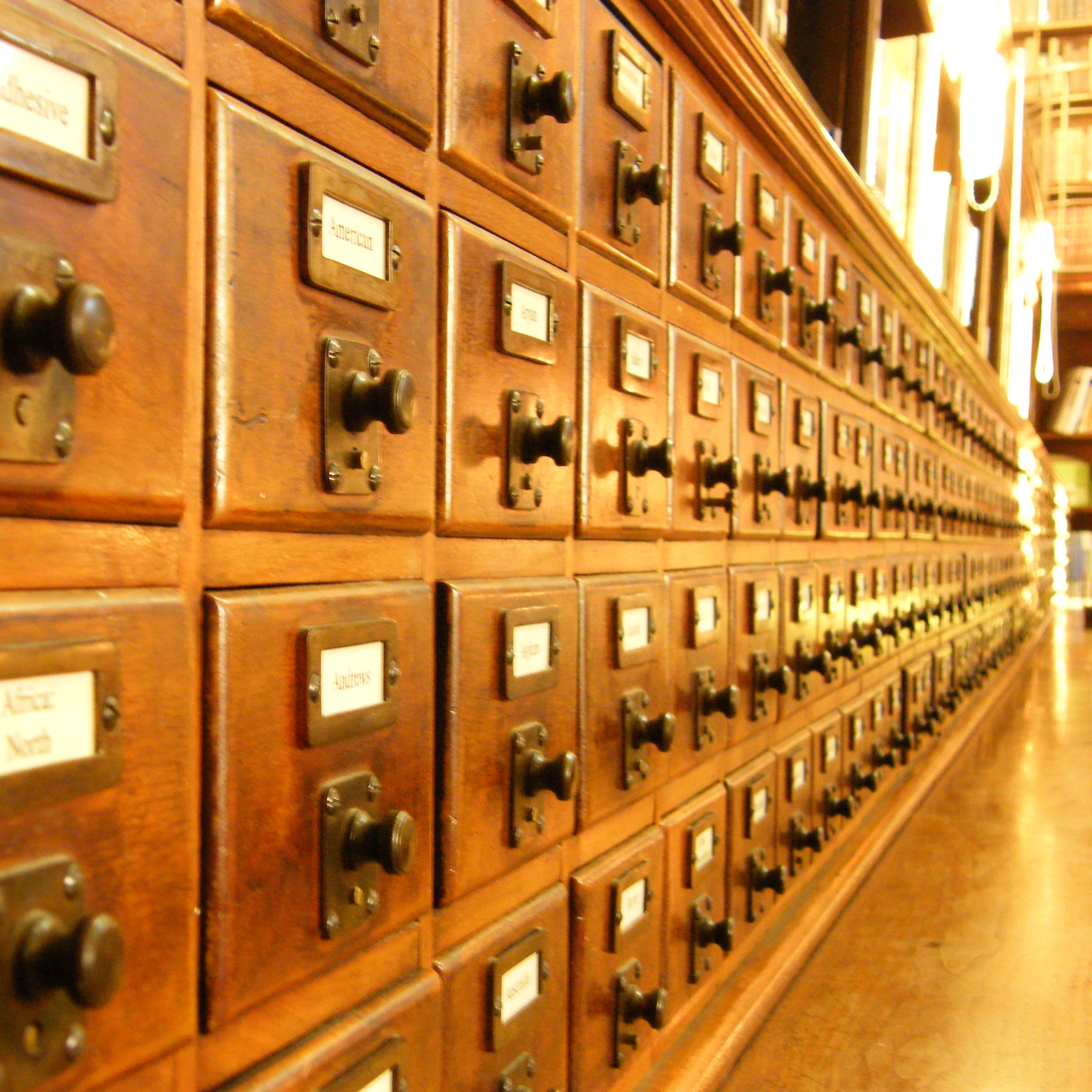
Until the advent of digital catalogues, card catalogues were the traditional method of organizing the list of resources and their location within a large library.

Some patrons may not know how to fully utilize library resources, or feel unease in approaching a staff member. Ways in which a library's content is displayed or accessed may have an impact on use. An antiquated or clumsy search system, or staff unwilling or not properly trained to engage their patrons, will limit a library's usefulness. In the public libraries of the United States, beginning in the 19th century, these problems drove the emergence of the library instruction movement, which advocated library user education. One of the early leaders was John Cotton Dana. The basic form of library instruction is sometimes known as information literacy.

Libraries should inform their users of what materials are available in their collections and how to access that information. Before the computer age, this was accomplished by the card catalogue—a cabinet (or multiple cabinets) containing many drawers filled with index cards that identified books and other materials. In a large library, the card catalogue often filled a large room.

The emergence of desktop computers and the Internet, however, has led to the adoption of electronic catalogue databases (often referred to as "webcats" or as online public access catalogues, OPACs), which allow users to search the library's holdings from any location with Internet access. This style of catalogue maintenance is compatible with new types of libraries, such as digital libraries and distributed libraries, as well as older libraries that have been retrofitted. Large libraries may be scattered within multiple buildings across a town, each having multiple floors, with multiple rooms housing their resources across a series of shelves called bays. Once a user has located a resource within the catalogue, they must then use navigational guidance to retrieve the resource physically, a process that may be assisted through signage, maps, GPS systems, or RFID tagging.

Finland has the highest number of registered book borrowers per capita in the world. Over half of Finland's population are registered borrowers. In the US, public library users have borrowed on average roughly 15 books per user per year from 1856 to 1978. From 1978 to 2004, book circulation per user declined approximately 50%. The growth of audiovisuals circulation, estimated at 25% of total circulation in 2004, accounts for about half of this decline.

=== Relationship with the Internet ===
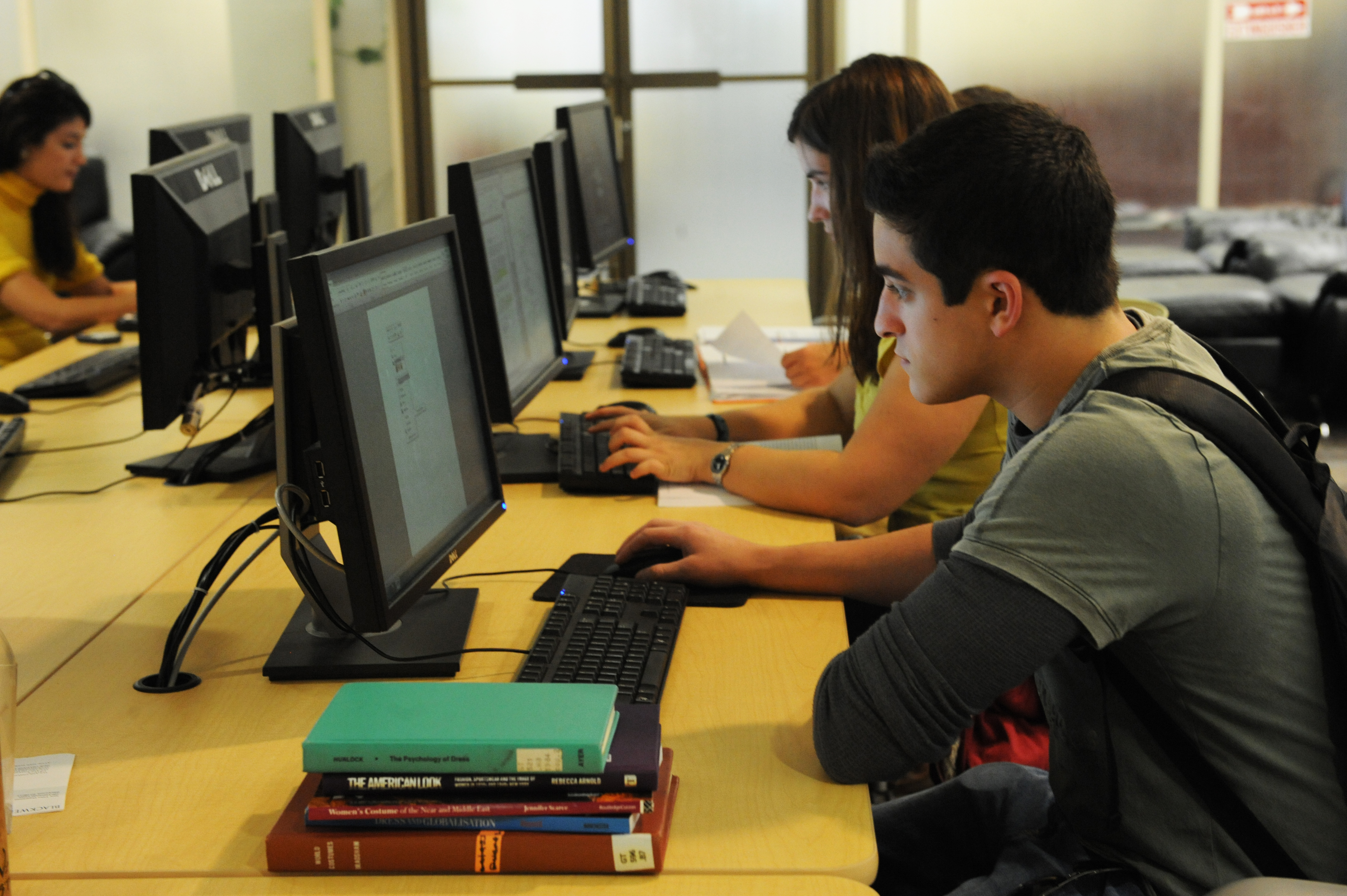
Library patrons using the Internet at Howard Tilton Library at Tulane University in New Orleans, Louisiana

A library may make use of the Internet in a number of ways, from creating its own library website to making the contents of its catalogues searchable online. Some specialised search engines such as Google Scholar offer a way to facilitate searching for academic resources such as journal articles and research papers. The Online Computer Library Center allows anyone to search the world's largest repository of library records through its WorldCat online database. Websites such as LibraryThing and Amazon provide abstracts, reviews, and recommendations of books. Libraries provide computers and Internet access to allow people to search for information online. Online information access is particularly attractive to younger library users.

Digitization of books, particularly those that are out-of-print, in projects such as Google Books provides resources for library and other online users. Due to their holdings of valuable material, some libraries are important partners for search engines such as Google in realizing the potential of such projects and have received reciprocal benefits in cases where they have negotiated effectively. As the prominence of and reliance on the Internet has grown, library services have moved the emphasis from mainly providing print resources to providing more computers and more Internet access. Libraries face a number of challenges in adapting to new ways of information seeking that may stress convenience over quality, reducing the priority of information literacy skills. The potential decline in library usage, particularly reference services, puts the necessity for these services in doubt.

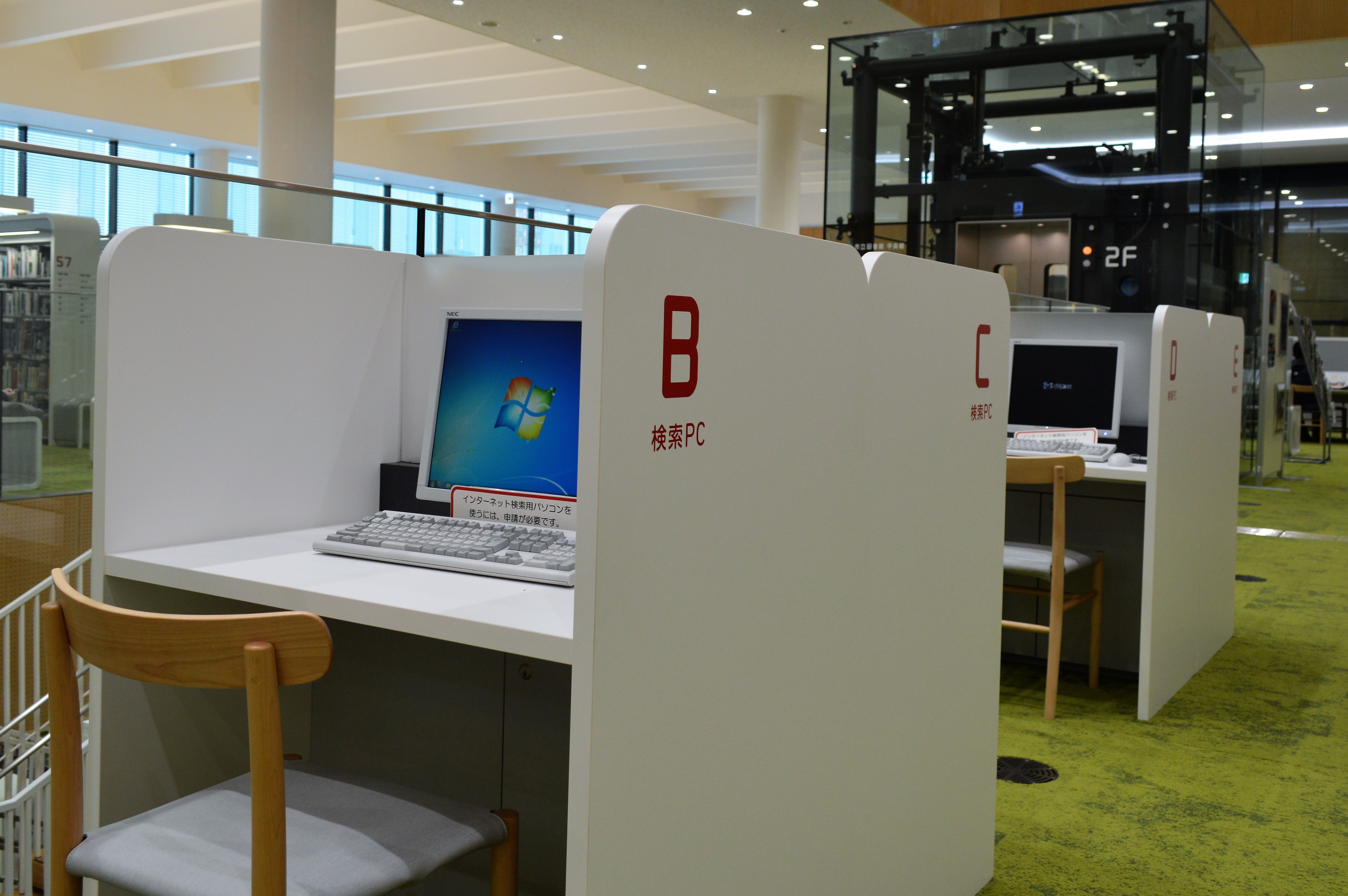
Library carrel desk at Fukuchiyama Public Library in Fukuchiyama, Japan

Library scholars have acknowledged that libraries need to address the ways that they market their services if they are to compete with the Internet and mitigate the risk of losing users. This includes promoting the information literacy skills training considered vital across the library profession. Many US-based research librarians rely on the ACRL Framework for Information Literacy in order to guide students and faculty in research. However, marketing of services has to be adequately supported financially in order to be successful. This can be problematic for library services that are publicly funded and find it difficult to justify diverting tight funds to apparently peripheral areas such as branding and marketing.

The privacy aspect of library usage in the Internet age is a matter of growing concern and advocacy; privacy workshops are run by the Library Freedom Project which teach librarians about digital tools (such as the Tor network) to thwart mass surveillance.

== Librarians ==
Libraries are usually staffed by a combination of professionally trained librarians, paraprofessional staff sometimes called library technicians, and support staff. Some topics related to the education of librarians and allied staff include accessibility of the collection, acquisition of materials, arrangement and finding tools, the book trade, the influence of the physical properties of the different writing materials, language distribution, role in education, rates of literacy, budgets, staffing, libraries for specially targeted audiences, architectural merit, patterns of usage, the role of libraries in a nation's cultural heritage, and the role of government, church, or private sponsorship. Since the 1960s, issues of computerization and digitization have arisen.

== Types ==
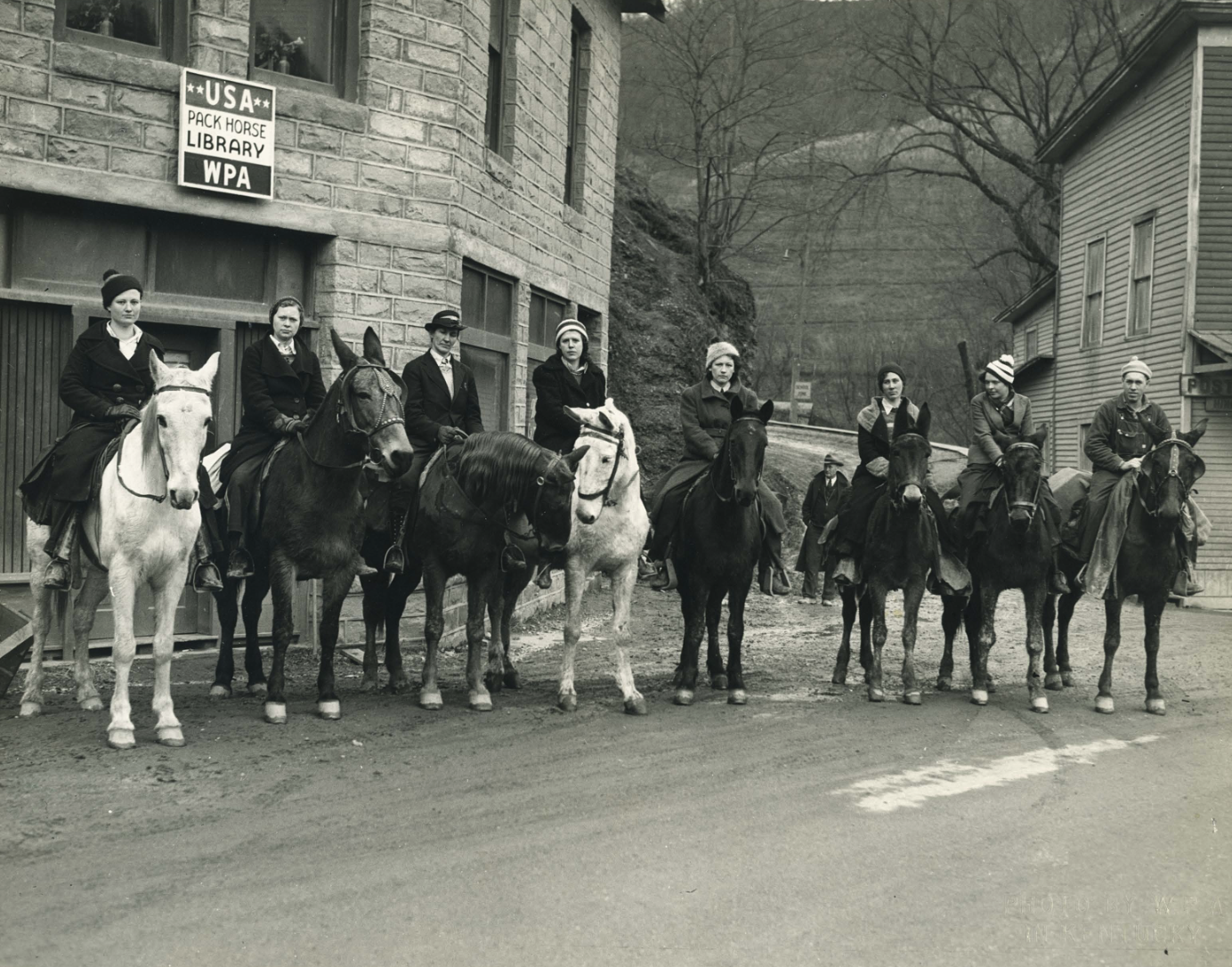
W.P.A. Packhorse Libraries, Book Carriers ready to take the trail from Hindman, Kentucky.

Many institutions make a distinction between a circulating or lending library, where materials are expected and intended to be loaned to patrons, institutions, or other libraries, and a reference library where material is not lent out. Travelling libraries, such as the early horseback libraries of eastern Kentucky and bookmobiles, are generally of the lending type. Modern libraries are often a mixture of both, containing a general collection for circulation, and a reference collection which is restricted to the library premises. Also, increasingly, digital collections enable broader access to material that may not circulate in print, and enables libraries to expand their collections even without building a larger facility. Lamba (2019) reinforced this idea by observing that "today's libraries have become increasingly multi-disciplinary, collaborative and networked" and that applying Web 2.0 tools to libraries would "not only connect the users with their community and enhance communication but will also help the librarians to promote their library's activities, services, and products to target both their actual and potential users".

=== Library system ===
A library system is a central organization created to manage and coordinate operations and services in or between different centers, buildings or libraries branches and library patrons. They use a library classification to organize their volumes and nowadays also use an Integrated library system - an enterprise resource planning system for a library used to track items owned, orders made, bills paid, and patrons who have borrowed information resources. Many counties, states and universities have developed their own library systems. For example, the Arrowhead Library System is a geographically based library system, established in 1965 to serve seven counties in Northeastern Minnesota with 29 member libraries in the system. In 2012 it merged with the North Country Library Cooperative to become the state's first regional public and multitype library system. The London Public Library in Canada has 16 branches, and the Helsinki Metropolitan Area Libraries, in Finland, has 63 libraries. Some countries, such as Venezuela, have only one library system for the whole country; the National Library of Venezuela has 685 branches.

==== Library branch ====
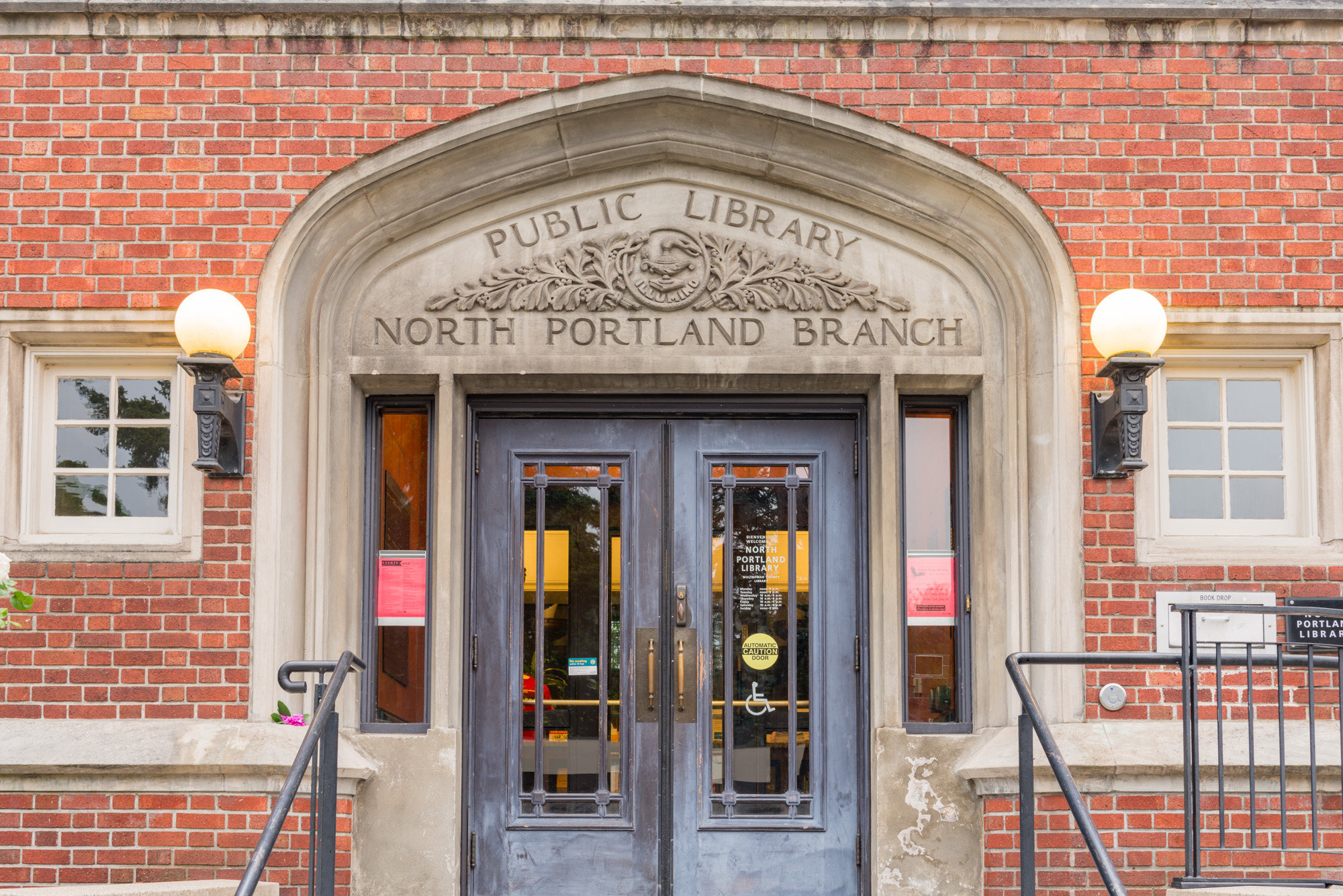
North Portland Branch Library, Portland, Oregon.

A library branch, branch library or community library is a local library that forms part of a larger library system, using the same library classification for its catalogs and is interconnected with all the other branches of the system through an integrated library system.

Some countries' municipalities have their own library system, such as London Public Library (Canada) with 16 library branches, Helsinki Metropolitan Area Libraries (Finland) with 63 libraries, and the National Library of Venezuela with 685 branches.

Some popular library branches include New York Public Library Main Branch, part of New York Public Library System, and Martin Luther King Jr. Memorial Library, a branch of District of Columbia Public Library System.

=== Academic libraries ===
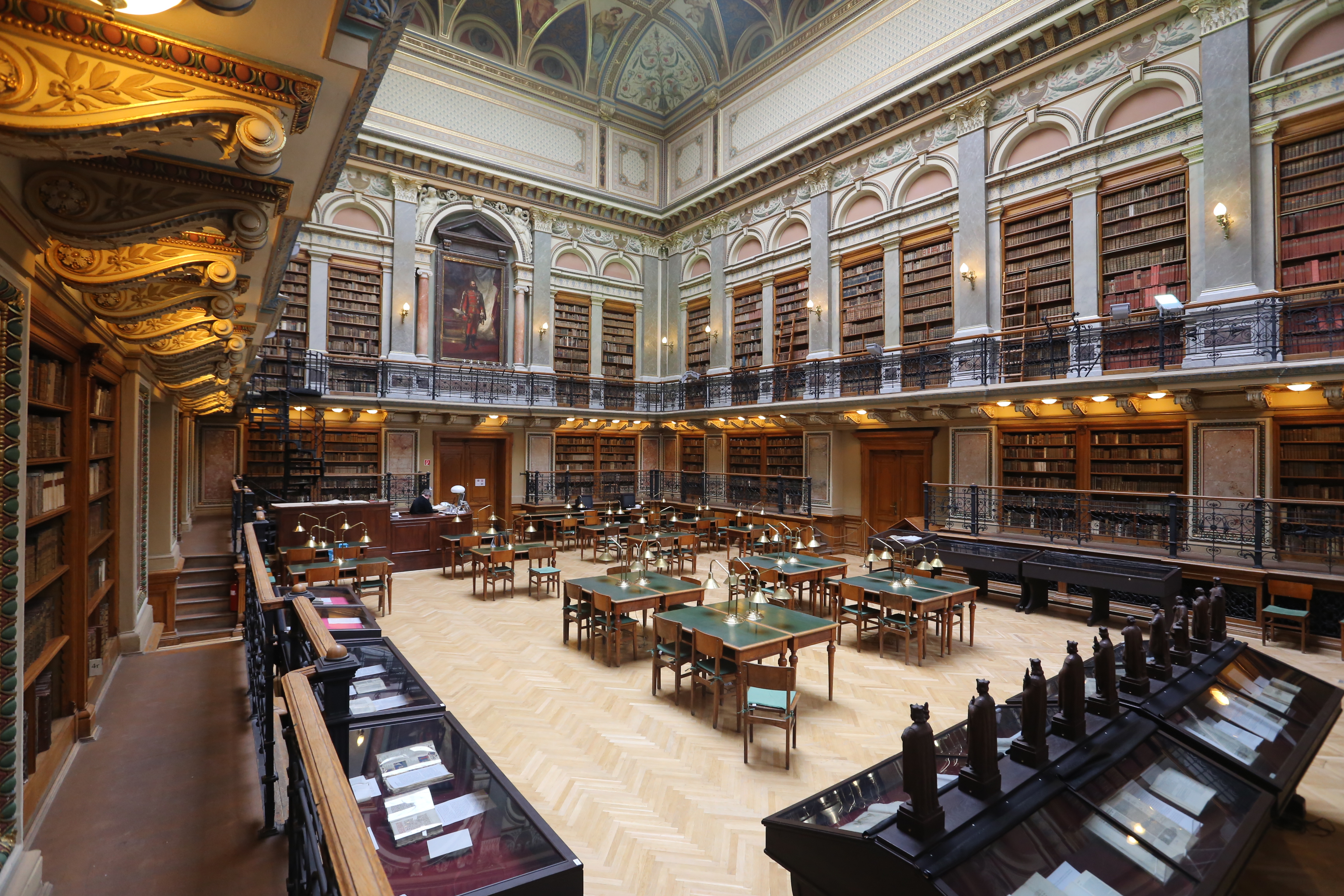
The University Library at Eötvös Loránd University, Budapest, Hungary.

Academic libraries are generally located on college and university campuses and primarily serve the students and faculty of that and other academic institutions. Some academic libraries, especially those at public institutions, are accessible to members of the general public in whole or in part. Library services are sometimes extended to the general public at a fee; some academic libraries create such services in order to enhance literacy levels in their communities.

Academic libraries are libraries that are hosted in post-secondary educational institutions, such as colleges and universities. Their main functions are to provide support in research, consultancy and resource linkage for students and faculty of the educational institution. Academic libraries house current, reliable and relevant information resources spread through all the disciplines which serve to assuage the information requirements of students and faculty. In cases where not all books are housed some libraries have E-resources, where they subscribe for a given institution they are serving, in order to provide backups and additional information that is not practical to have available as hard copies. Furthermore, most libraries collaborate with other libraries in exchange of books.

Specific course-related resources are usually provided by the library, such as copies of textbooks and article readings held on 'reserve' (meaning that they are loaned out only on a short-term basis, usually a matter of hours). Some academic libraries provide resources not usually associated with libraries, such as the ability to check out laptop computers, web cameras, or scientific calculators.

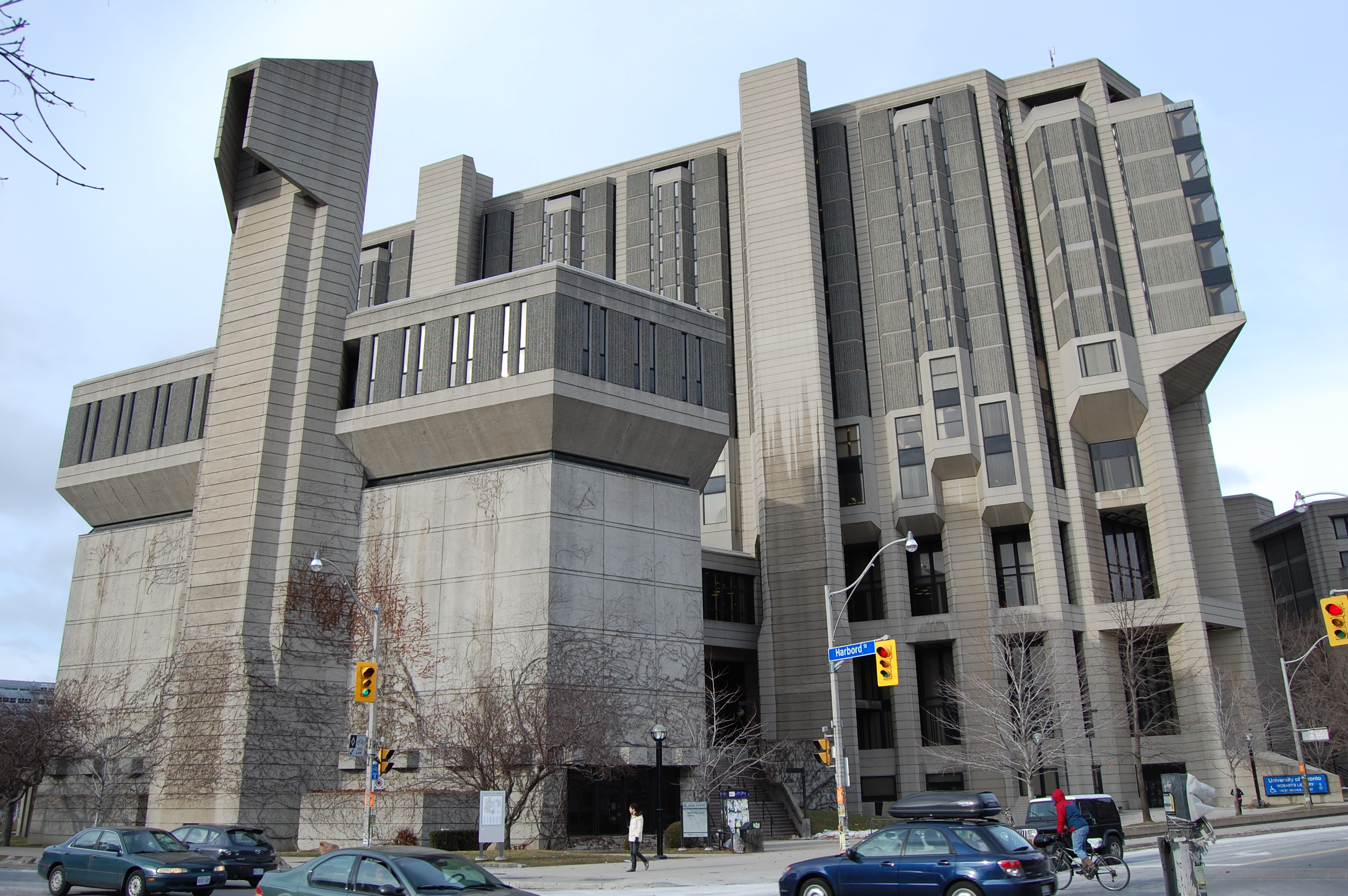
The Robarts Library at the University of Toronto, Canada.

Academic libraries offer workshops and courses outside of formal, graded coursework, which are meant to provide students with the tools necessary to succeed in their programs. These workshops may include help with citations, effective search techniques, journal databases, and electronic citation software. These workshops provide students with skills that can help them achieve success in their academic careers (and often, in their future occupations), which they may not learn inside the classroom.

The academic library provides a quiet study space for students on campus; it may also provide group study space, such as meeting rooms. In North America, Europe, and other parts of the world, academic libraries are becoming increasingly digitally oriented. The library provides a "gateway" for students and researchers to access various resources, both print/physical and digital. Academic institutions are subscribing to electronic journals databases, providing research and scholarly writing software, and usually provide computer workstations or computer labs for students to access journals, library search databases and portals, institutional electronic resources, Internet access, and course- or task-related software (i.e. word processing and spreadsheet software). Some academic libraries take on new roles, for instance, acting as an electronic repository for institutional scholarly research and academic knowledge, such as the collection and curation of digital copies of students' theses and dissertations. Moreover, academic libraries are increasingly acting as publishers on their own on a not-for-profit basis, especially in the form of fully Open Access institutional publishers.

=== Children's libraries ===
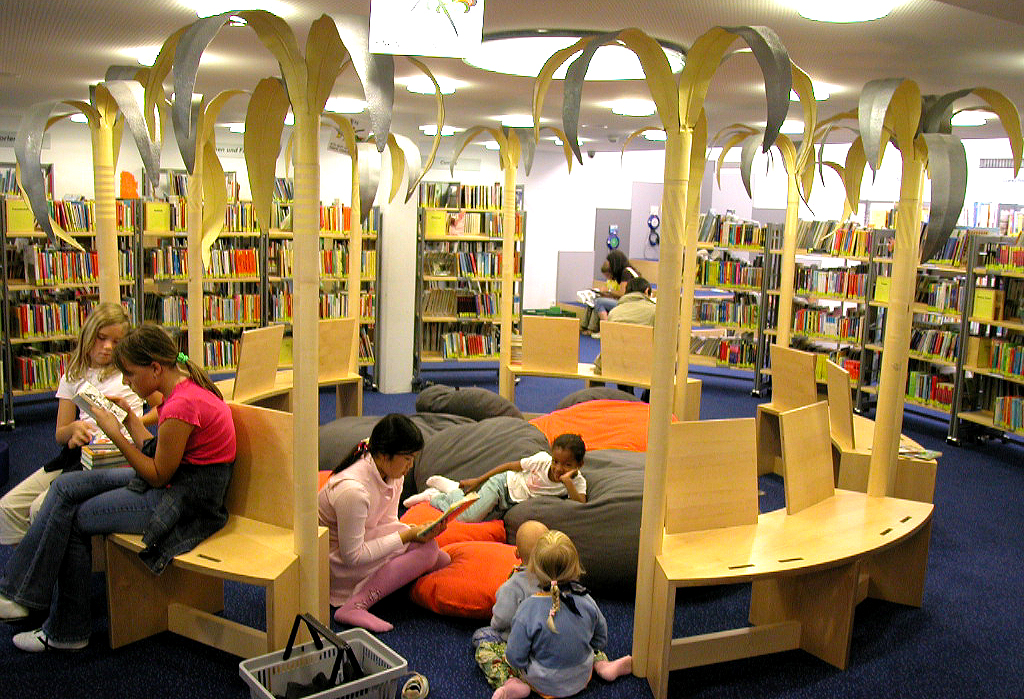
Children's library section in the Ludwigsburg City Library.

Children's libraries are special collections of books intended for juvenile readers and usually kept in separate rooms of general public libraries. Some children's libraries have entire floors or wings dedicated to them in bigger libraries while smaller ones may have a separate room or area for children. They are an educational agency seeking to acquaint the young with the world's literature and to cultivate a love for reading. Their work supplements that of the public schools.

Services commonly provided by public libraries may include storytelling sessions for infants, toddlers, preschool children, or after-school programs, all with an intention of developing early literacy skills and a love of books. One of the most popular programs offered in public libraries are summer reading programs for children, families, and adults.

Another popular reading program for children is PAWS TO READ or similar programs where children can read to certified therapy dogs. Since animals are a calming influence and there is no judgment, children learn confidence and a love of reading. Many states have these types of programs: parents need simply ask their librarian to see if it is available at their local library.

=== Media libraries ===
In some countries, a difference is made between libraries that hold multimedia materials like videos, such as movies and documentaries, and sound recordings, such as music and audio books, and libraries that hold physical books. The French term médiatheque describes this sort of multimedia library and came from a period in the history of French libraries during the 1970s. Notable media libraries include Sendai Mediatheque in Japan, and from within France the Médiathèque Musicale Mahler, and Médiathèques de Saint-Étienne.

=== National libraries ===
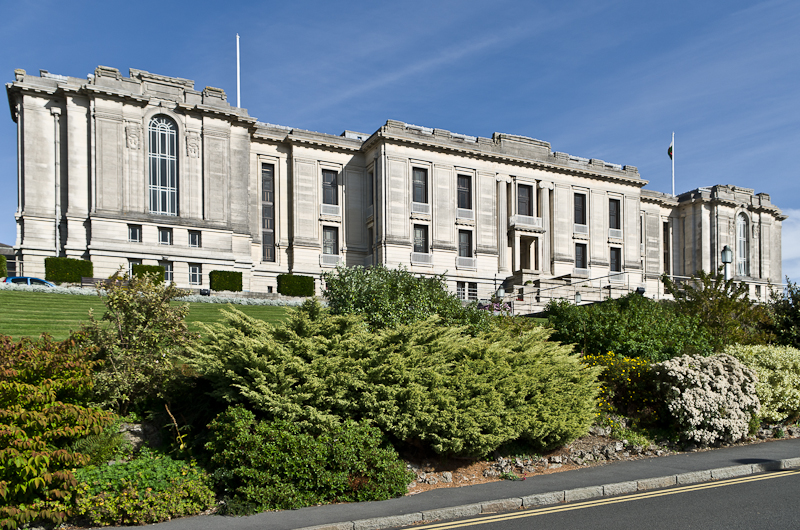
National Library of Wales, Aberystwyth.

A national or state library serves as a national repository of information, and has the right of legal deposit, which is a legal requirement that publishers in the country need to deposit a copy of each publication with the library. Unlike a public library, a national library rarely allows citizens to borrow books. Often, their collections include numerous rare, valuable, or significant works. There are wider definitions of a national library, putting less emphasis on the repository character. The first national libraries had their origins in the royal collections of the sovereign or some other supreme body of the state.

Many national libraries cooperate within the National Libraries Section of the International Federation of Library Associations and Institutions (IFLA) to discuss their common tasks, define and promote common standards, and carry out projects helping them to fulfill their duties. The national libraries of Europe participate in The European Library which is a service of the Conference of European National Librarians (CENL).

=== Public lending libraries ===
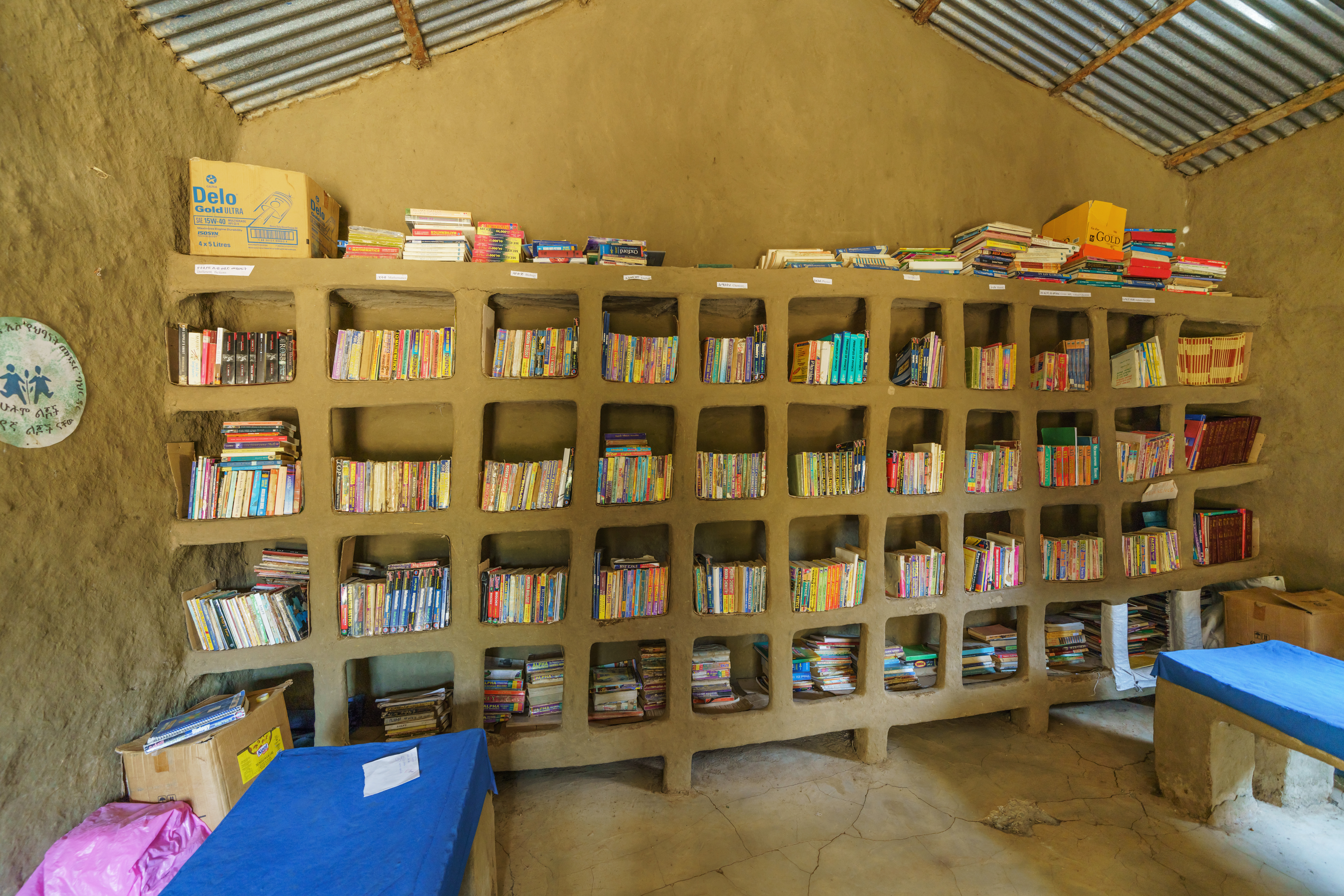
A community library in Ethiopia.

A public library provides services to the general public. If the library is part of a countywide library system, citizens with an active library card from around that county can use the library branches associated with the library system. A library can serve only their city, however, if they are not a member of the county public library system. Much of the materials located within a public library are available for borrowing. The library staff decides upon the number of items patrons are allowed to borrow, as well as the details of borrowing time allotted. Typically, libraries issue library cards to community members wishing to borrow books. Often visitors to a city are able to obtain a public library card.

Many public libraries also serve as community organizations that provide free services and events to the public, such as reading groups and toddler story time. For many communities, the library is a source of connection to a vast world, obtainable knowledge and understanding, and entertainment. According to a study by the Pennsylvania Library Association, public library services play a major role in fighting rising illiteracy rates among youths. Public libraries are protected and funded by the public they serve.

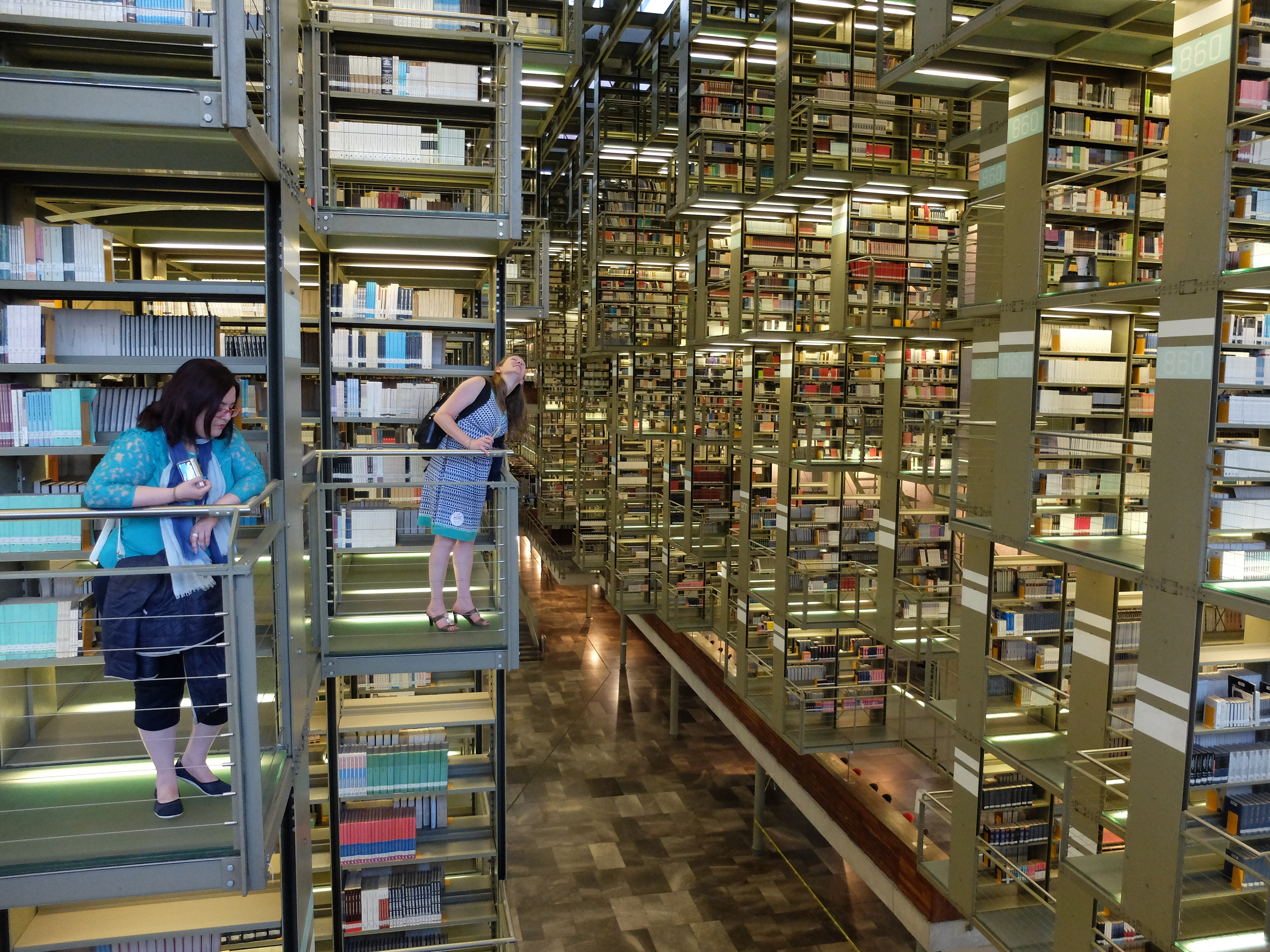
Stacks of the José Vasconcelos Library in Mexico City, Mexico.

As the number of books in libraries have steadily increased since their inception, the need for compact storage and access with adequate lighting has grown. The stack system involves keeping a library's collection of books in a space separate from the reading room. This arrangement arose in the 19th century. Book stacks quickly evolved into a fairly standard form in which the cast iron and steel frameworks supporting the bookshelves also supported the floors, which often were built of translucent blocks to permit the passage of light (but were not transparent, for reasons of modesty). The introduction of electric lights had a huge impact on lighting in libraries. The use of glass floors was largely discontinued, though floors were still often composed of metal grating to allow air to circulate in multi-story stacks. As more space was needed, a method of moving shelves on tracks (compact shelving) was introduced to cut down on otherwise wasted aisle space.

Library 2.0, a term coined in 2005, is the library's response to the challenge of Google and an attempt to meet the changing needs of users by using Web 2.0 technology. Some of the aspects of Library 2.0 include, commenting, tagging, bookmarking, discussions, use of online social networks by libraries, plug-ins, and widgets. Inspired by Web 2.0, it is an attempt to make the library a more user-driven institution.

Despite the importance ascribed to public libraries, their budgets are often cut by legislatures. In some cases, funding has dwindled so much that libraries have been forced to cut their hours and release employees.

=== Reference libraries ===
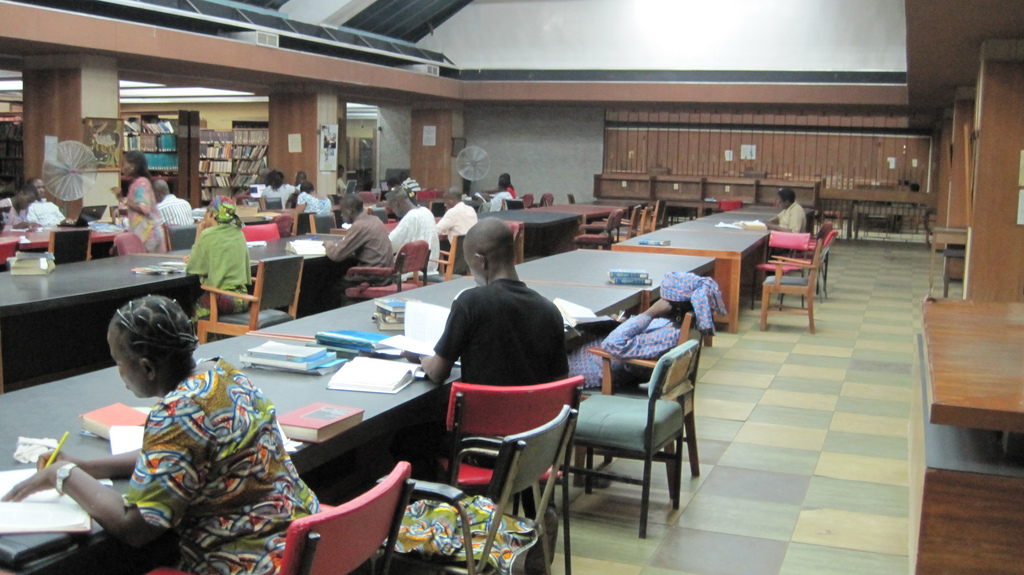
Graduate and post-graduate reading room at the University of Ibadan, Nigeria.

A reference library does not lend books and other items; instead, they can only be read at the library itself. Typically, such libraries are used for research purposes, for example at a university. Some items at reference libraries may be historical and even unique. Many lending libraries contain a "reference section", which holds books, such as dictionaries, which are common reference books, and are therefore not lent out. Such reference sections may be referred to as "reading rooms" or "study rooms", which may also include newspapers and periodicals. An example of a reading room is the Hazel H. Ransom Reading Room at the Harry Ransom Center of the University of Texas at Austin, which maintains the papers of literary agent Audrey Wood.

=== Research libraries ===
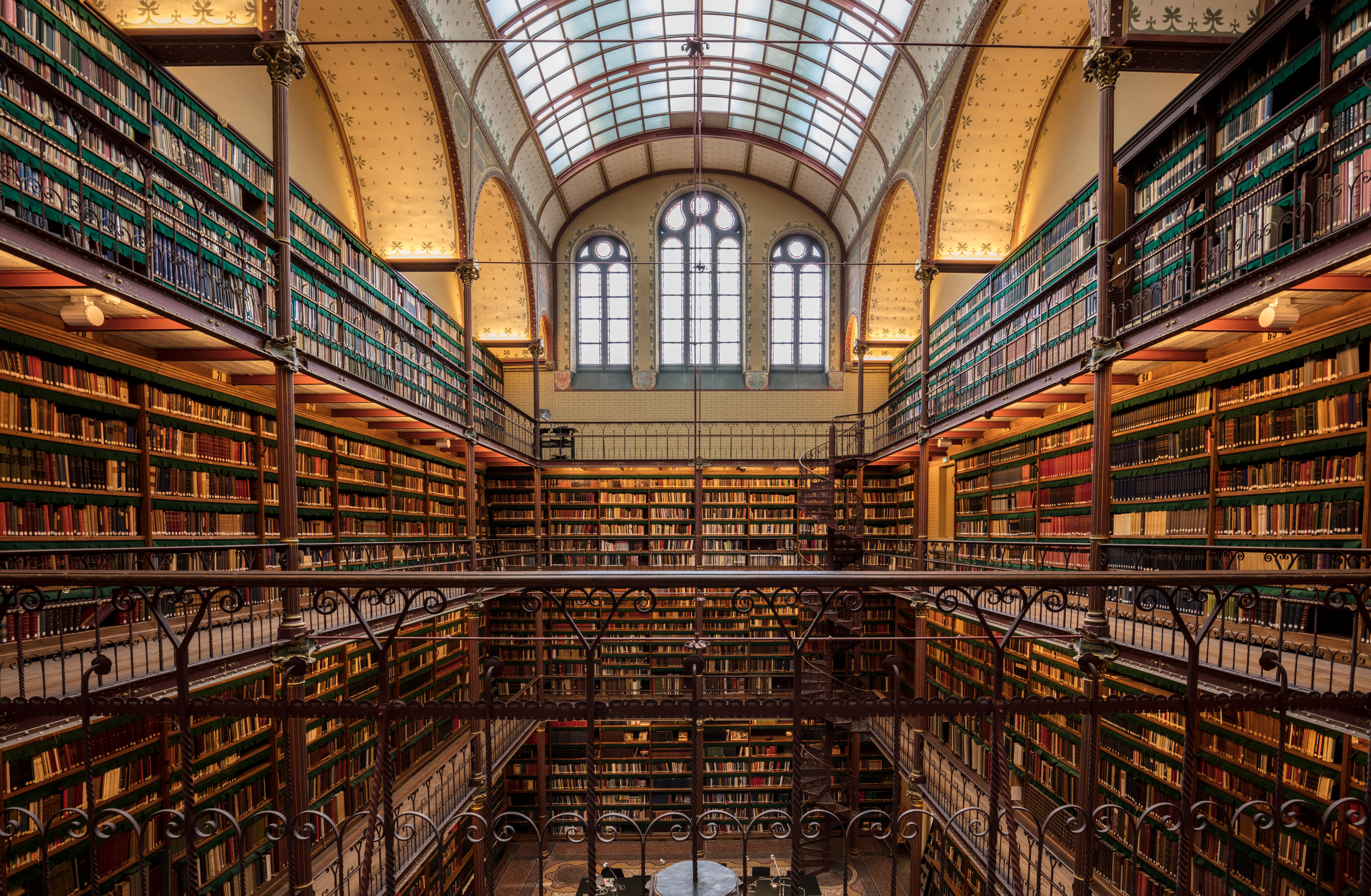
Main reading room of the Rijksmuseum Research Library is the largest public art history research library in the Netherlands. The library is part of the Rijksmuseum in Amsterdam.

A research library is a collection of materials on one or more subjects. A research library supports scholarly or scientific research and will generally include primary as well as secondary sources; it will maintain permanent collections and attempt to provide access to all necessary materials. A research library is most often an academic or national library, but a large special library may have a research library within its special field, and a very few of the largest public libraries also serve as research libraries. A large university library may be considered a research library; and in North America, such libraries may belong to the Association of Research Libraries. In the United Kingdom, they may be members of Research Libraries UK (RLUK). Particularly important collections in England may be designated by Arts Council England.

A research library can be either a reference library, which does not lend its holdings, or a lending library, which does lend all or some of its holdings. Some extremely large or traditional research libraries are entirely reference in this sense, lending none of their materials; most academic research libraries, at least in the US and the UK, now lend books, but not periodicals or other materials. Many research libraries are attached to a parent organization and may serve only members of that organization. Examples of research libraries include the British Library, the Bodleian Library at Oxford University and the New York Public Library Main Branch on 42nd Street in Manhattan, State Public Scientific Technological Library of the Siberian Branch of the Russian Academy of Science.

=== Digital libraries ===
Digital libraries are libraries that house digital resources, such as text, photographs, and audio. These are curated by digital librarians. In the 21st century, there has been increasing use of the internet to gather and retrieve data. The shift to digital libraries has greatly impacted the way people use physical libraries. Between 2002 and 2004, the average American academic library saw the overall number of transactions decline approximately 2.2%. The University of California Library System saw a 54% decline in circulation between 1991 and 2001 of 8,377,000 books to 3,832,000.

=== Special libraries ===
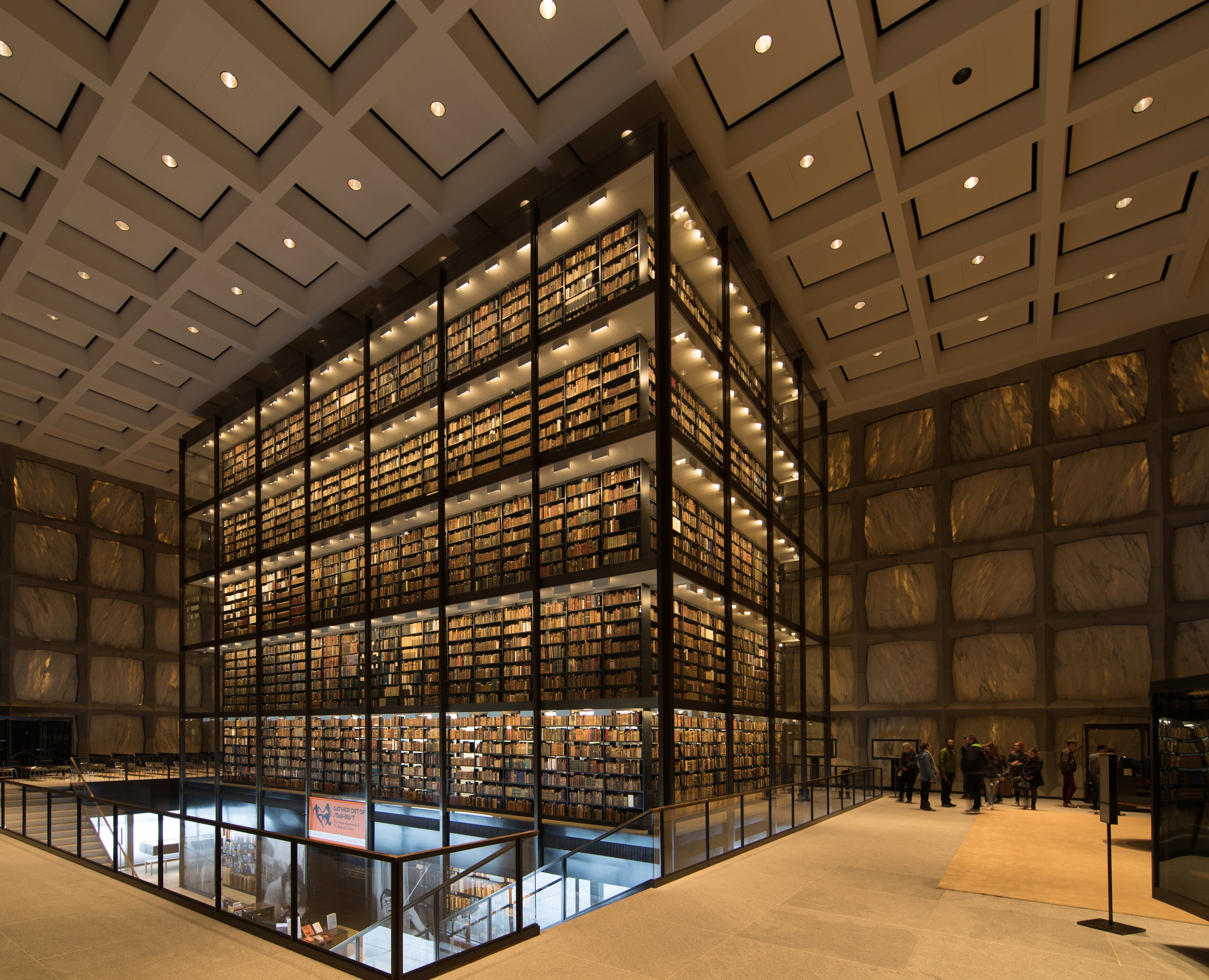
Bookshelves at the Beinecke Rare Book & Manuscript Library.

Many private businesses and public organizations, including hospitals, churches, museums, research laboratories, law firms, and many government departments and agencies, maintain their own libraries for the use of their employees in doing specialized research related to their work. Depending on the particular institution, special libraries may or may not be accessible to the general public or elements thereof.

In more specialized institutions such as law firms and research laboratories, librarians employed in special libraries are commonly specialists in the institution's field rather than generally trained librarians, and often are not required to have advanced degrees in a specifically library-related field due to the specialized content and clientele of the library.

Special libraries can also include women's libraries or LGBTQ libraries, which serve the needs of women and the LGBTQ community. Libraries and the LGBTQ community have an extensive history, and there are currently many libraries, archives, and special collections devoted to preserving and helping the LGBTQ community. Women's libraries, such as the Vancouver Women's Library or the Women's Library @LSE are examples of women's libraries that offer services to women and girls and focus on women's history.

Some special libraries, such as governmental law libraries, hospital libraries, and military base libraries commonly are open to public visitors to the institution in question. Depending on the particular library and the clientele it serves, special libraries may offer services similar to research, reference, public, academic, or children's libraries, often with restrictions such as only lending books to patients at a hospital or restricting the public from parts of a military collection. Given the highly individual nature of special libraries, visitors to a special library are often advised to check what services and restrictions apply at that particular library.

Special libraries are distinguished from special collections, which are branches or parts of a library intended for rare books, manuscripts, and other special materials, though some special libraries have special collections of their own, typically related to the library's specialized subject area.

For more information on specific types of special libraries, see law libraries, medical libraries, music libraries, or transportation libraries.

=== Library makerspaces ===
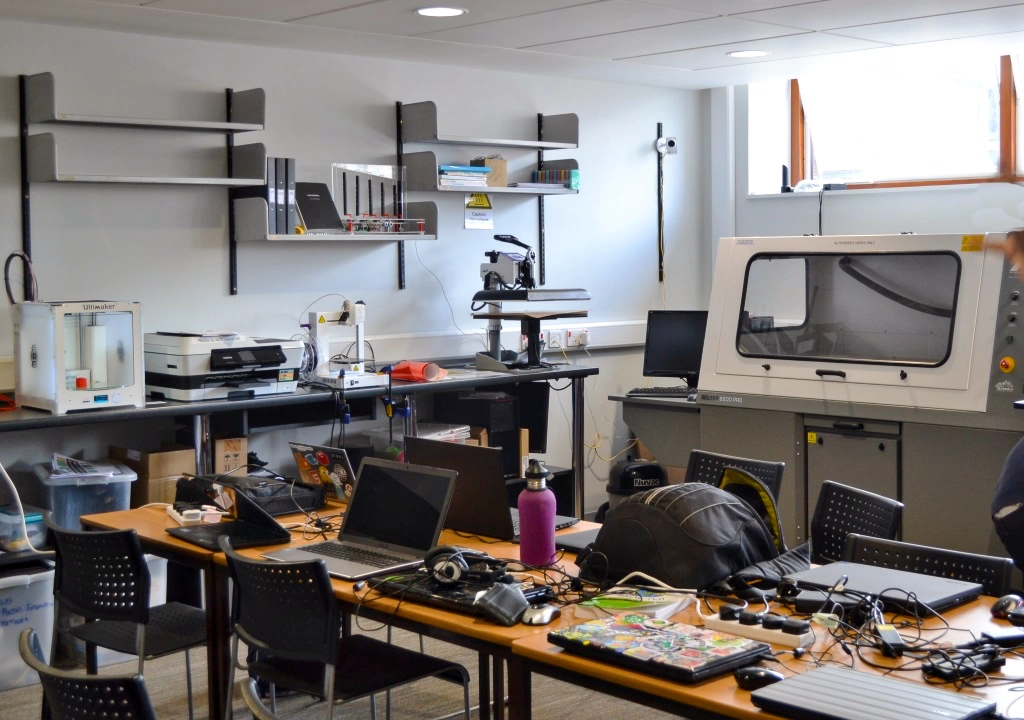
Fab lab in a library

A library makerspace is a creative, hands-on makerspace located within a library that provides tools, technology, and spaces for patrons to design, prototype, and create projects. Some makerspaces in libraries could include a photographic studio, digital recording studio, sewing room, computer lab cubicles, woodshop / machine shop and other hardware equipment spaces or fab labs for 3D printers, CNC machines, laser cutters, laser engraving, injection molding machines, sewing machines, electronics and electronic kits. They may also offer software for graphic design, video editing, 3D modeling \ 3D rendering, or computer programming educational resources. Library makerspaces aim to expand the traditional role of libraries from primarily providing access to books and information toward enhancing hard skills and enabling active learning by doing. These spaces support STEM and STEAM education, digital literacy, and lifelong learning for all ages. Activities can range from code clubs, robotics clubs to arts, crafts, and multimedia production.

== Associations ==
The International Federation of Library Associations and Institutions (IFLA) is the leading international association of library organizations. It is the global voice of the library and information profession, and its annual conference provides a venue for librarians to learn from one another.

Library associations in Asia include the Indian Library Association (ILA), Indian Association of Special Libraries and Information Centers (IASLIC), Bengal Library Association (BLA), Kolkata, Pakistan Library Association, the Pakistan Librarians Welfare Organization, the Bangladesh Association of Librarians, Information Scientists and Documentalists, the Library Association of Bangladesh, and the Sri Lanka Library Association (founded 1960).

National associations of the English-speaking world include the American Library Association, the Australian Library and Information Association, the Canadian Library Association, the Library and Information Association of New Zealand Aotearoa, and the Research Libraries UK (a consortium of 30 university and other research libraries in the United Kingdom). Library bodies such as CILIP (formerly the Library Association, founded 1877) may advocate the role that libraries and librarians can play in a modern Internet environment, and in the teaching of information literacy skills. The Nigerian Library Association is the recognized group for librarians working in Nigeria and it was founded in 1962.

Public library advocacy is support given to a public library for its financial and philosophical goals or needs. Most often this takes the form of monetary or material donations or campaigning to the institutions which oversee the library, sometimes by advocacy groups such as Friends of Libraries and community members. Originally, library advocacy was centered on the library itself, but current trends show libraries positioning themselves to demonstrate they provide "economic value to the community" in means that are not directly related to the checking out of books and other media.

== Protection ==
Libraries are considered part of the cultural heritage and are one of the primary objectives in many state and domestic conflicts and are at risk of destruction and looting. Financing is often carried out by robbing valuable library items. National and international coordination regarding military and civil structures for the protection of libraries is operated by Blue Shield International and UNESCO. From an international perspective, despite the partial dissolution of state structures and very unclear security situations as a result of the wars and unrest, robust undertakings to protect libraries are being carried out. The topic is also the creation of "no-strike lists", in which the coordinates of important cultural monuments such as libraries have been preserved.

== See also ==
- Academic software bundles
- Cyber cafe
- Document management system
- Libraries in fiction
- Library anxiety
- Library portal
- List of libraries
- Trends in library usage
