= ECorridors =

eCorridors is an information technology program to promote and facilitate broadband access for communities of Virginia and nearby areas. It was developed by faculty at the Virginia Polytechnic Institute and State University (VT) in the spring of 2000.

The term “eCorridors” refers to the electronic data highways that such infrastructure represents. This brand name was created by Virginia Tech's Vice President for Information Technologies, Earving L. Blythe, and the faculty member who was charged with leading eCorridors, Brenda van Gelder.

== Purpose ==
eCorridors serve as the electronic highway, creating economic development in the networked economy. Just as our transportation road system enabled interstate commerce throughout the United States, eCorridors enable e-commerce in the global marketplace.

== Timeline ==
July 20, 2000 – Erv Blythe introduces the e-58 concept to Danville and Pittsylvania County, Virginia audience of elected and appointed officials at Averett College.

2000 – eCorridors conducted a Danville Economic Base Study. This served as the foundation on which a comprehensive strategy for enhancing the competitiveness of Danville via broadband network infrastructure was eventually developed and executed.

August 2000 – Danville (eDan) announcement.

August 23, 2000 – eCorridors (Erv Blythe) e-58 meeting with Neil Noyes – Federal Economic Development Representative for Economic Development Administration.

September 2000 - Original e-58 idea proposition development: Virginia Tech proposes to facilitate development of advanced, fiber optic infrastructure stretching across the rural, southern part of Virginia stretching from the east coast to the western border along U.S. route 58. Project title, e58 Free Trade Corridor.

September 25, 2000 – VT, Averett College, Dan River Community College partner with the Dan River Region to develop eDan – announcement made at Averett College.

October 2000 - eCorridors in cooperation with regional public and private sector entities, and local internet service providers, proposes the development of a next generation, high-bandwidth network infrastructure to serve the City of Danville and Pittsylvania County. Included in the proposal is the establishment of a distributed Multimedia Services Access Point (MSAP) serving Danville and Pittsylvania County with high bandwidth advanced communications and commodity internet connectivity.

April 2001 – Economic Base Study and Infrastructure Assessment Model delivered to the Future of the Piedmont Foundation.

April 2001 – First iteration of eCorridors website developed.

2001 – A report on e-commerce practices of textiles companies was produced, utilizing the Dan River Textile Mill in Danville and one in North Carolina as case studies.

May 9, 2001 – eCorridors met with Paul Elswick of LENOWISCO to discuss ways in which the southwest communities of Virginia might integrate broadband for economic development objectives.

July 2001 – Host tobacco commission e-58 task force at VT.

December 15, 2001 - The Danville Science Center hosts an eCorridors display of wireless laptop computers running over a wireless network. Community demonstration. Similar Demo in Gretna in early 2002.

January 11, 2002 – eCorridors was invited to give a presentation to Senator George Allen.

January 22, 2002 – Brenda van Gelder gave a presentation to the Southern Governor's Association and SURA regarding the eCorridors concept and strategy.

February 2002 – eCorridors provided support for a proposal by LENOWISCO requesting funds from the Virginia Tobacco Indemnification and Community Revitalization Commission.

February 2002 - Dan River Region citizens are invited to tune in for a free broadcast of this year's JASON Project to be held February 5, 2002 from 11:30 a.m. to 1:30 a.m. in the Pittsylvania Room of the Learning Resources Center at Danville Community College. Jean Plymale, a member of Virginia Tech's eCorridors team which is looking to extend the eDan initiative, will be moderating the live broadcast from the Danville location. Interaction will take place over the Internet at network speeds that are about 1000 times faster than a dial-up computer connection. Networks with this high-speed capability enable the delivery of interactive broadcast, including quality video and high fidelity audio, both of which are critical components of the JASON Project experiment and distance learning. The "Internet2" application used in this statewide broadcast demonstrates some of what will be capable across this community with eDan.

March 2002 - The Virginia Tobacco Indemnification and Community Revitalization Commission issued a Request for Proposals for “e-58”, the first of eCorridors’ conceptual large-scale regional infrastructure initiatives.

July 2002 - one of eCorridors’ initial projects, then known as “e-58” was featured in Virginia Business magazine].

August 2002 - eCorridors introduces the idea of a fiber optic architecture is called a“Geodesic Network Mesh” network, which will interconnect access nodes for all communities within a target area with fully meshed, fiber optic facilities. Each community would be served by fiber connecting it to at least two other communities for increased reliability.

2002 - Erv Blythe and Clark Jones received the Southern Piedmont Technology Council “Stars in Technology” award for their joint efforts and commitment to the Southern Piedmont region in creating a vision for the area, and shaping Virginia Tech's commitment to the region through its eCorridors initiative.

2003 - eCorridors was referenced in the Alliance for Public Technology report, “A Nation of Laboratories: Broadband Policy Experiments in the States”.

March 2003 - The eCorridors Program released the output of a series of studies on issues surrounding the investment and development of strategic telecommunications infrastructure for communities. http://www.ecorridors.vt.edu/research/papers/stircne/index_flash.shtml%5B%5D

The studies utilized the Southside and Southwest Virginia regions as a model for a low-cost Geodesic Mesh network design and viable financial model that could be replicated in any region of the U.S. The overall premise of the studies is that investment in advanced, “next generation” telecommunications infrastructure is an essential and achievable component of a region's economic development and quality of life.

This best practices strategy and design served as a model for the later implementation of a regional broadband network deployed by the MidAtlantic Broadband Cooperative (and link to mbc-va.com), which began in November 2003 and was completed in the fall of 2006.

July 2003 - North Carolina's Congressman Brad Miller announced federal funding for Caswell county to link to the Danville “eCorridors” network.

February 2004 - eCorridors’ work in Danville is mentioned in Light Reading, a telecom industry online newsletter.

2004 - eCorridors is included in the “List of Authorities” for an Amicus Brief submitted by EDUCAUSE in the Nixon vs. Missouri Municipal League, before the Supreme Court of the United States.

July 2005 – eCorridors defines the enterprise GIS project in the IT project database.

Oct. 2005 – eCorridors hosts California Redwood Technology Consortium to discuss rural broadband development, October, 24-25

August 2006 - eCorridors launched the Community Broadband Access Map (CBAM)

June 2007 – First annual report generated from data collected by the Community Broadband Access Map application.

July 2007 – eCorridors presents the Community Broadband Access Map application to the Virginia Chapter of the American Association of Planners at the annual meeting held at Wintergreen Virginia.

2008 – eCorridors assists Drew Clark in the development of the Broadband Census Speed Testing application:

Feb. 2008 - 18 month report generated from data collected by the Community Broadband Access Map using new Federal Communications Commission (FCC) speed tier assignments.

May 2008 - eCorridors adds social networking to the annotated bibliography.

April 2008 - eCorridors hosts the first in a series of Federal Communications Commission (FCC) and the United States Department of Agriculture (USDA) educational workshop on rural broadband on Wednesday, April 30, 2008 in the Squires Student Center's Haymarket Theater from 9:00 am to 5:00 pm

October 2010 - eCorridors launched the Accelerate Virginia website. Accelerate Virginia is a statewide effort to engage and educate the public and raise awareness about broadband availability in Virginia through an innovative broadband mapping application developed by Virginia Tech faculty members.

== Other eCorridors organizations ==
Following a presentation by Virginia Tech eCorridors’ staff in 2002, the Southern Governors’ Association, working with the Southeastern Universities Research Association (SURA) created a “Southern eCorridors Project” to support the establishment of high capacity fiber optic research computer networks.

In December 2006 the University of Arkansas launched the “eCorridors' Arkansas Research and Education Optical Network (AREON)”, creating a fiber optic network within the state and linking Arkansas to both regional and national optical networks.
