= E58 =

E58 may refer to:

- European route E58
- Okinawa Expressway and Naha Airport Expressway, route E58 in Japan
- Nimzo-Indian Defense, Encyclopaedia of Chess Openings code
- e-58, network in Virginia, USA
