= Coalition for Networked Information =

U.S. non-profit organization

CNI: Coalition for Networked Information
- CNI
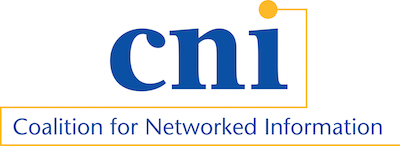
- Formation: 1990
- Founder: Paul Evan Peters
- Type: Non-profit organization
- Purpose: Dedicated to supporting the transformative promise of digital information technology for the advancement of scholarly communication and the enrichment of intellectual productivity.
- Headquarters: 1025 Connecticut Avenue NW, Suite 1200, Washington, D.C. 20036
- Location: Washington, DC
- Coordinates: 38.908861°N 77.043809°W
- Region served: International
- Methods: Program Plan
- Members: 244 (2020-2021)
- Official language: en
- Assistant Executive Director: Diane Goldenberg-Hart
- Board of directors: Steering Committee
- Parent organization: Association of Research Libraries, Educause
- Staff: 5 (2020)

The Coalition for Networked Information (CNI) is an organization whose mission is to promote networked information technology as a way to further the advancement of intellectual collaboration and productivity.

== Overview ==
The Coalition for Networked Information (CNI), a joint initiative of the Association of Research Libraries (ARL) and EDUCAUSE, promotes the use of digital information technology to advance scholarship and education. In establishing the Coalition under the leadership of founding Executive Director Paul Evan Peters, these sponsor organizations sought to broaden the community’s thinking beyond issues of network connectivity and bandwidth to encompass digital content and advanced applications to create, share, disseminate, and analyze such content in the service of research and education. CNI works on a broad array of issues related to the development and use of digital information in the research and education communities.

CNI fosters connections and collaboration between library and information technology communities, representing the interests of a wide range of member organizations from higher education, publishing, networking and telecommunications, information technology, government agencies, foundations, museums, libraries, and library organizations. Over 200 member organizations constitute CNI's membership, representing higher education, publishing, network and telecommunication, information technology, and libraries. CNI is fully funded from membership dues. Based in Washington, DC, CNI holds semi-annual membership meetings that serve as a bellwether for digital information issues and projects. CNI also hosts invitational conferences, co-sponsors related meetings and conferences, issues reports, advises government agencies and funders, and supports a variety of networked information initiatives. The organization regularly releases a pre-recorded video series which highlights timely topics in the networked information landscape.

== History ==
In 1990, the Association of Research Libraries (ARL), Educom, and CAUSE joined together to form CNI to create a collaborative project focused on high speed networking that would integrate the interests of academic and research libraries (ARL) and computing in higher education (Educom and CAUSE). Educom and CAUSE consolidated their organizations in 1998 to form EDUCAUSE, which is now one half of the partnership that oversees CNI. Structurally, CNI is a program of its founding associations with administrative oversight provided by ARL; it is not a legally separate entity. CNI’s oversight is provided by the boards and CEOs of the founding organizations, and a steering committee guides its program.

Paul Evan Peters was the founding executive director; Joan K. Lippincott joined CNI as the associate executive director at that time. In 1997, Clifford Lynch assumed the role of executive director and continued to serve in that capacity until his death in 2025. Lynch was succeeded by Kate Zwaard. Lippincott retired from the organization in December 2019 and now holds the position of associate director emerita.

CNI’s program has included projects in the areas of architectures and standards for networked information, scholarly communication, economics of networked information, Internet technology and infrastructure, teaching and learning, institutional and professional implications of the networked environment, and government information on the Internet.
