= Clifford Lynch =

American computer scientist (1954–2025)

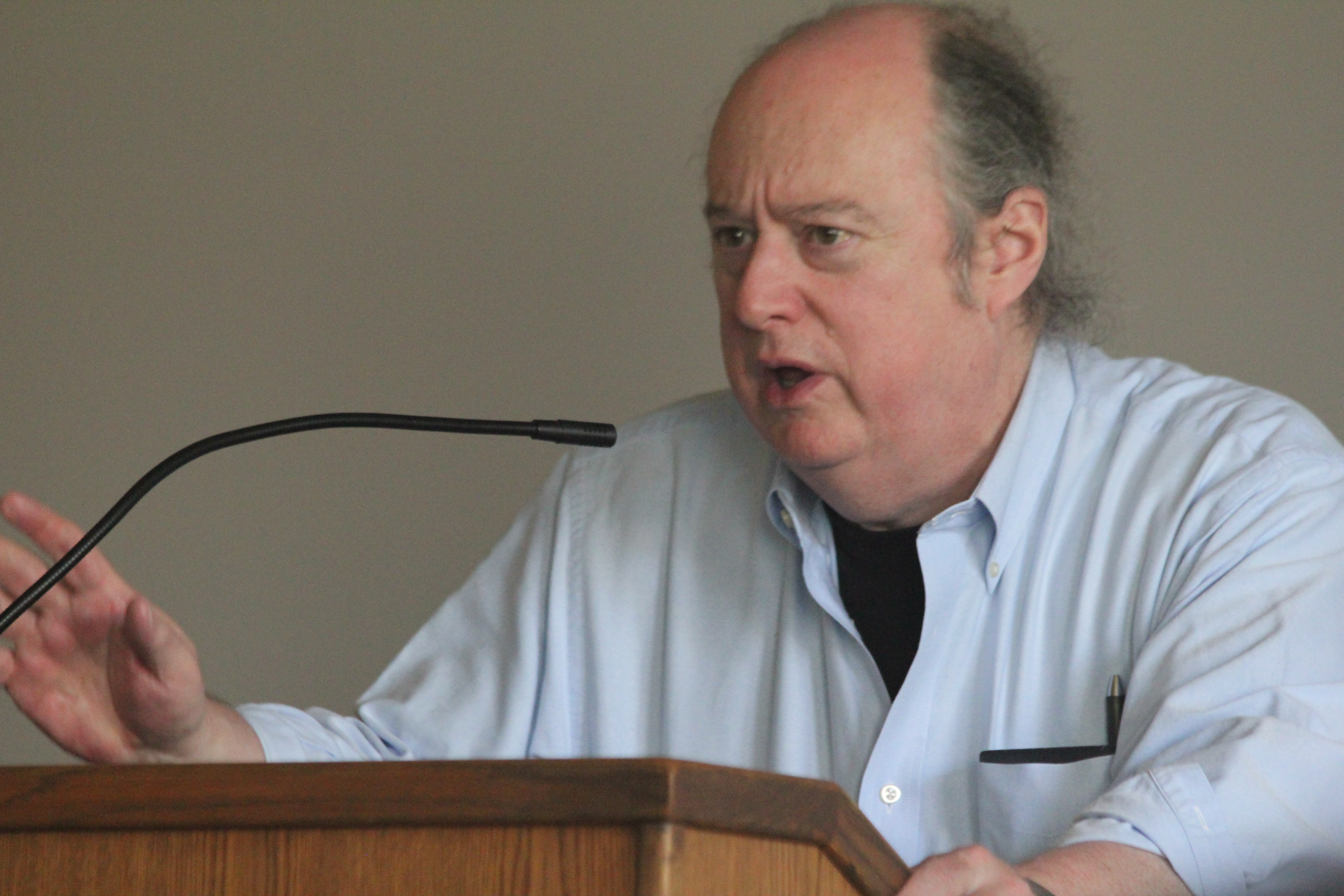
- Lynch in 2015
- Born: December 31, 1954
- Died: April 10, 2025 (aged 70)
- Education: Columbia University (BA, MS); University of California, Berkeley (PhD)
- Occupation: Director of the Coalition for Networked Information

Clifford Alan Lynch (December 31, 1954 – April 10, 2025) was an American computer scientist and director of the Coalition for Networked Information (CNI) from 1997 to his death. He was also an adjunct professor at the UC Berkeley School of Information.

== Education ==
Clifford Alan Lynch was born on December 31, 1954. He held a B.A in mathematics and computer science from Columbia College, an M.S. in computer science from the Columbia University School of Engineering, and a Ph.D. in computer science (1987) from the University of California, Berkeley.

== Career and awards ==
In 1974, Clifford Lynch got his start in the library field as a systems programmer at New York University, and in 1976, he advanced to a senior systems programmer. Due to his connection to Edwin Brownrigg at New York University, Brownrigg recruited him to move to the University of California - Berkeley to help create an online public access catalog that intended to show what was available across all nine of the University of California's library campuses. The group that Lynch was part of successfully created MELVYL which was pushed out for use in 1983.

The name of the online system, MELVYL was somewhat named after Melvil Dewey, a major pioneer in the library field. Some of the main advanced procedures of MELVYL is that it created easier user access through the search functions. This is something that was taken into consideration as the cataloging was completed within the libraries on campus. While this catalog was overall something that was embraced, it brought up issues for older materials that were taking more time to be converted to an online form that was accessible.

To further the advancement of information technology, the coalition of networked information (CNI) was established in 1990 with Paul Evans Peters taking the position of executive director. when Peters passed in 1996, Clifford Lynch stepped into the position where he remained the executive director until his death. Once he took over the position, he continued in his efforts to further stress the importance of supporting advancements of research and teaching in academia through information technology. This really caused an effort to focus on how to best adapt to the digital age while taking digital preservation into account. These issues were brought up and discussed at the CNI semiannual membership meetings.

Lynch's fostering of discussion and work regarding digital journals and online catalogs overall allowed libraries throughout the years to focus more on the use of their space by patrons rather than on the storage of their collections on site.

Prior to joining CNI, Lynch spent eighteen years at the University of California Office of the President, the last ten as Director of Library Automation. He was both a past president and recipient of the 2008 Award of Merit of the American Society for Information Science and Technology (ASIS&T), and a fellow of the American Association for the Advancement of Science and the National Information Standards Organization. Lynch lectured extensively on issues pertaining to digital libraries, information policy, and emerging interoperability standards.

In 2011, Lynch was appointed co-chair of the National Academies Board on Research Data and Information (BRDI). He received the American Library Association's Joseph W. Lippincott Award, EDUCAUSE's Leadership Award in Public Policy and Practice, and the American Society for Engineering Education Engineering Library Division's Homer Bernhardt Distinguished Service Award. He was elected as an ACM Fellow in 2017.

In 2024, Lynch announced his retirement with an effective date of June 2025. Lynch died on April 10, 2025. Prior to his death, CNI announced a festschrift honoring his career. The festschrift was published in July 2025 in the form of an open access supplement in portal: Libraries and the Academy.

== Selected publications ==
- Clifford Lynch, Stewardship in the "Age of Algorithms", First Monday, Volume 22, Number 12 (December 4, 2017).
- Clifford A. Lynch, "Big data: How do your data grow?" Nature, vol. 455, no. 7209 (September 3, 2008).
- Clifford A. Lynch, "Digital Libraries, Learning Communities, and Open Education," Opening Up Education: The Collective Advancement of Education through Open Technology, Open Content, and Open Knowledge, Toru Iiyoshi, M. S. Vijay Kumar (Eds.), (Cambridge, MA: MIT Press, 2008).
- Clifford A. Lynch, "Imagining a University Press System to Support Scholarship in the Digital Age." Journal of Electronic Publishing. November 2012.
- Clifford A. Lynch and Joan K. Lippincott, "Institutional Repository Deployment in the United States as of Early 2005," D-Lib Magazine, 11:9 (September 2005).
- Clifford A. Lynch, "The Impact of Digital Scholarship on Research Libraries," The Journal of Library Administration 49:3 (April 2009), pp. 227–244.
- Clifford A. Lynch, "Open Computation: Beyond Human-Reader-Centric Views of Scholarly Literatures," Open Access: Key Strategic, Technical and Economic Aspects, Neil Jacobs (Ed.), (Oxford: Chandos Publishing, 2006), 185–193.
- Clifford A. Lynch, "Searching the Internet," Scientific American 276:3 (March 1997), pp. 52–56.
