= Englewood Cliffs, New Jersey =

Borough in New Jersey, United States

- Borough
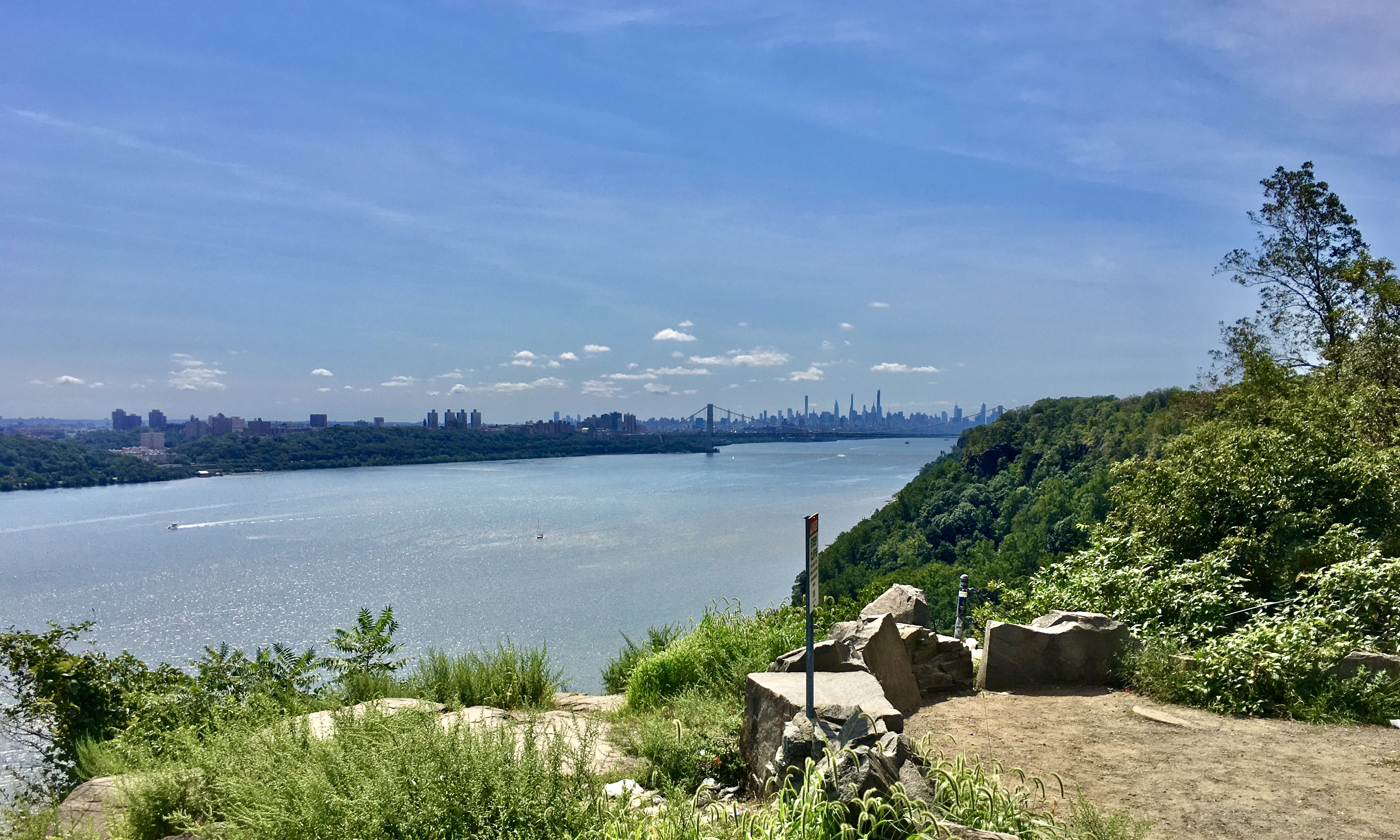
- Atop the Hudson Palisades in Englewood Cliffs, Bergen County, overlooking the Hudson River, the George Washington Bridge, and the skyscrapers of Midtown Manhattan, New York City

- Seal

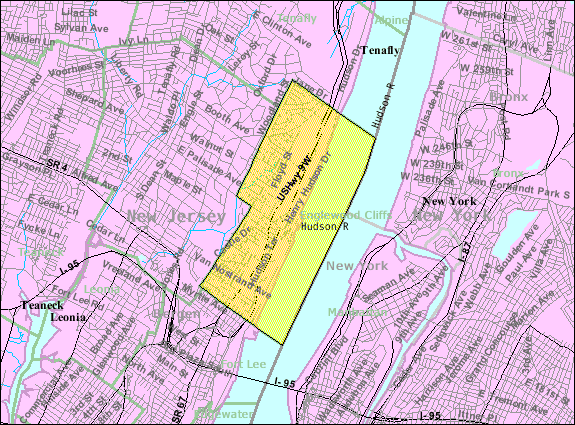
- Census Bureau map of Englewood Cliffs, New Jersey
- Interactive map of Englewood Cliffs, New Jersey
- Location in Bergen County Location in New Jersey Location in the United States
- Coordinates: 40.889721°N 73.941981°W
- Country: United States
- State: New Jersey
- County: Bergen
- Incorporated: May 10, 1895

Government
  - Type: Borough
  - Body: Borough Council
  - Mayor: Mark K. Park (R, term ends December 31, 2027)
  - Administrator: Intashan Chowdhury
  - Municipal clerk: Beauty Nadim

Area
  - Total: 3.37 sq mi (8.74 km^{2})
  - Land: 2.13 sq mi (5.51 km^{2})
  - Water: 1.25 sq mi (3.24 km^{2}) 36.91%
  - Rank: 318th of 565 in state 23rd of 70 in county
- Elevation: 318 ft (97 m)

Population (2020)
  - Total: 5,342
  - Estimate (2023): 5,321
  - Rank: 366th of 565 in state 59th of 70 in county
  - Density: 2,512.7/sq mi (970.2/km^{2})
  - Rank: 250th of 565 in state 51st of 70 in county
- Time zone: UTC−05:00 (Eastern (EST))
  - Summer (DST): UTC−04:00 (Eastern (EDT))
- ZIP Code: 07632
- Area code: 201
- FIPS code: 3400321510
- GNIS feature ID: 0885210
- Website: englewoodcliffsnj.org

Englewood Cliffs is a borough in Bergen County, in the U.S. state of New Jersey. As of the 2020 United States census, the borough's population was 5,342, an increase of 61 (+1.2%) from the 2010 census count of 5,281, which in turn reflected a decline of 41 (-0.8%) from the 5,322 counted in the 2000 census.

The borough houses the world headquarters of CNBC (Versant), the North American headquarters of South Korean conglomerate LG Corp, and the American headquarters of global CPG conglomerate Unilever, and was home to both Ferrari and Maserati North America.

The borough was formed in 1895, having seceded from Englewood Township, with William Outis Allison serving as the new municipality's first mayor,} as part of the "Boroughitis" then sweeping Bergen County, with 26 boroughs formed in the county in 1894 alone.

== Geography ==
According to the U.S. Census Bureau, the borough had a total area of 3.37 square miles (8.73 km^{2}), including 2.13 square miles (5.51 km^{2}) of land and 1.24 square miles (3.22 km^{2}) of water (36.91%).

The borough borders Englewood, Fort Lee and Tenafly in Bergen County, and the New York City boroughs of The Bronx and Manhattan across the Hudson River.

== Demographics ==
Historical population
Census	Pop.	Note	%±
1900	218		—
1910	410		88.1%
1920	534		30.2%
1930	809		51.5%
1940	888		9.8%
1950	966		8.8%
1960	2,913		201.6%
1970	5,938		103.8%
1980	5,698		−4.0%
1990	5,634		−1.1%
2000	5,322		−5.5%
2010	5,281		−0.8%
2020	5,342		1.2%
2023 (est.)	5,321	▼	−0.4%
Population sources: 1900–1920 1900–1910; 1910–1930 1900–2020; 2000 2010 2020

In 2012, Englewood Cliffs was ranked 129th in the nation, and fifth in New Jersey, on the list of most expensive ZIP Codes in the United States by Forbes magazine, with a median home price of $1,439,115. In 2006, the borough was ranked sixth in New Jersey and 78th in the nation in the magazine's rankings, with a median house price of $1,112,500.

=== Racial and ethnic composition ===
Englewood Cliffs borough, Bergen County, New Jersey – Racial and ethnic composition Note: the US Census treats Hispanic/Latino as an ethnic category. This table excludes Latinos from the racial categories and assigns them to a separate category. Hispanics/Latinos may be of any race.
Race / Ethnicity (NH = Non-Hispanic)	Pop 2000	Pop 2010	Pop 2020	% 2000	% 2010	% 2020
White alone (NH)	3,341	2,739	2,201	62.78%	51.87%	41.20%
Black or African American alone (NH)	72	93	107	1.35%	1.76%	2.00%
Native American or Alaska Native alone (NH)	1	0	0	0.02%	0.00%	0.00%
Asian alone (NH)	1,580	2,027	2,534	29.69%	38.38%	47.44%
Native Hawaiian or Pacific Islander alone (NH)	0	0	0	0.00%	0.00%	0.00%
Other race alone (NH)	9	3	21	0.17%	0.06%	0.39%
Mixed race or Multiracial (NH)	59	103	138	1.11%	1.95%	2.58%
Hispanic or Latino (any race)	260	316	341	4.89%	5.98%	6.38%
Total	5,322	5,281	5,342	100.00%	100.00%	100.00%

=== 2020 census ===
As of the 2020 census, Englewood Cliffs had a population of 5,342. The median age was 49.0 years. 20.8% of residents were under the age of 18 and 26.3% were 65 years of age or older. For every 100 females, there were 92.6 males, and for every 100 females age 18 and over, there were 88.2 males.

100.0% of residents lived in urban areas, while 0.0% lived in rural areas.

There were 1,846 households, of which 33.0% had children under the age of 18 living in them. Of all households, 68.2% were married-couple households, 9.3% were households with a male householder and no spouse or partner present, and 20.6% were households with a female householder and no spouse or partner present. About 15.0% of all households were made up of individuals, and 9.7% had someone living alone who was 65 years of age or older.

There were 1,961 housing units, of which 5.9% were vacant. The homeowner vacancy rate was 2.4%, and the rental vacancy rate was 6.8%.

=== 2010 census ===
The 2010 United States census counted 5,281 people, 1,824 households, and 1,527 families in the borough. The population density was 2,528.1 per square mile (976.1/km^{2}). There were 1,924 housing units at an average density of 921.0 per square mile (355.6/km^{2}). The racial makeup was 56.35% (2,976) White, 2.08% (110) Black or African American, 0.08% (4) Native American, 38.52% (2,034) Asian, 0.00% (0) Pacific Islander, 0.78% (41) from other races, and 2.20% (116) from two or more races. Hispanic or Latino residents of any race were 5.98% (316) of the population.

Of the 1,824 households, 30.7% had children under the age of 18; 73.1% were married couples living together; 8.2% had a female householder with no husband present and 16.3% were non-families. Of all households, 14.3% were made up of individuals and 10.0% had someone living alone who was 65 years of age or older. The average household size was 2.87 and the average family size was 3.17.

21.5% of the population were under the age of 18, 4.6% from 18 to 24, 20.0% from 25 to 44, 29.7% from 45 to 64, and 24.1% who were 65 years of age or older. The median age was 47.2 years. For every 100 females, the population had 93.7 males. For every 100 females ages 18 and older there were 86.7 males.

Korean Americans accounted for 20.3% of the borough's population. Englewood Cliffs has witnessed expansion of this demographic from the adjoining Fort Lee Koreatown, as well as from the borough's status as the North American headquarters of the LG Corporation, based in Seoul. The Korean language is spoken at home by more than half of the residents of Englewood Cliffs, according to U.S. Census Bureau data released in 2017.

Same-sex couples headed 10 households in 2010, an increase from the three counted in 2000.

The Census Bureau's 2006–2010 American Community Survey showed that (in 2010 inflation-adjusted dollars) median household income was $101,964 (with a margin of error of +/− $32,516) and the median family income was $126,985 (+/− $37,177). Males had a median income of $88,438 (+/− $9,456) versus $52,950 (+/− $7,757) for females. The per capita income for the borough was $53,260 (+/− $12,101). About 8.0% of families and 16.1% of the population were below the poverty line, including 10.9% of those under age 18 and 32.7% of those age 65 or over.

=== 2000 census ===
As of the 2000 United States census there were 5,322 people, 1,818 households, and 1,559 families residing in the borough. The population density was 2,544.3 inhabitants per square mile (982.4/km^{2}). There were 1,889 housing units at an average density of 903.1 per square mile (348.7/km^{2}). The racial makeup of the borough was 66.84% White, 1.37% African American, 0.04% Native American, 29.69% Asian, 0.71% from other races, and 1.35% from two or more races. Hispanic or Latino of any race were 4.89% of the population.

There were 1,818 households, out of which 31.4% had children under the age of 18 living with them, 76.0% were married couples living together, 7.0% had a female householder with no husband present, and 14.2% were non-families. 12.5% of all households were made up of individuals, and 8.3% had someone living alone who was 65 years of age or older. The average household size was 2.90 and the average family size was 3.16.

In the borough the age distribution of the population shows 20.7% under the age of 18, 5.7% from 18 to 24, 23.9% from 25 to 44, 27.7% from 45 to 64, and 22.0% who were 65 years of age or older. The median age was 45 years. For every 100 females, there were 89.1 males. For every 100 females age 18 and over, there were 84.8 males.

The median income for a household in the borough was $106,478, and the median income for a family was $113,187 in 2000. In 2008, the estimated median income had risen to $134,419. Males had a median income of $79,501 versus $42,019 for females. The per capita income for the borough was $57,399. About 1.4% of families and 2.6% of the population were below the poverty line, including 1.9% of those under age 18 and 5.3% of those age 65 or over.

As of the 2000 Census, 11.76% of Englewood Cliffs' residents identified themselves as being of Korean ancestry, which was the tenth highest in the United States and eighth highest of any municipality in New Jersey, for all places with 1,000 or more residents identifying their ancestry. The 2000 census found that 3.4% of Englewood Cliffs residents identified themselves as being of Armenian-American ancestry, the eighth highest percentage of Armenian American people in any place in the United States. In the 2000 census, 8.42% of Englewood Cliffs' residents identified themselves as being of Chinese ancestry. This was the third highest percentage of people with Chinese ancestry in any place in New Jersey with 1,000 or more residents identifying their ancestry. In this same census, 2.91% of Englewood Cliffs' residents identified themselves as being of Japanese ancestry, which was the fifth highest of any municipality in New Jersey—behind Fort Lee (6.09%), Demarest (3.72%), Edgewater (3.22%) and Leonia (3.07%)—for all places with 1,000 or more residents identifying their ancestry. As of the 2010 Census, 20.3% of the population (1,072) reported as being of Korean ancestry, 8.9% (472) Chinese and 5.7% (300) Asian Indian.

== Economy ==
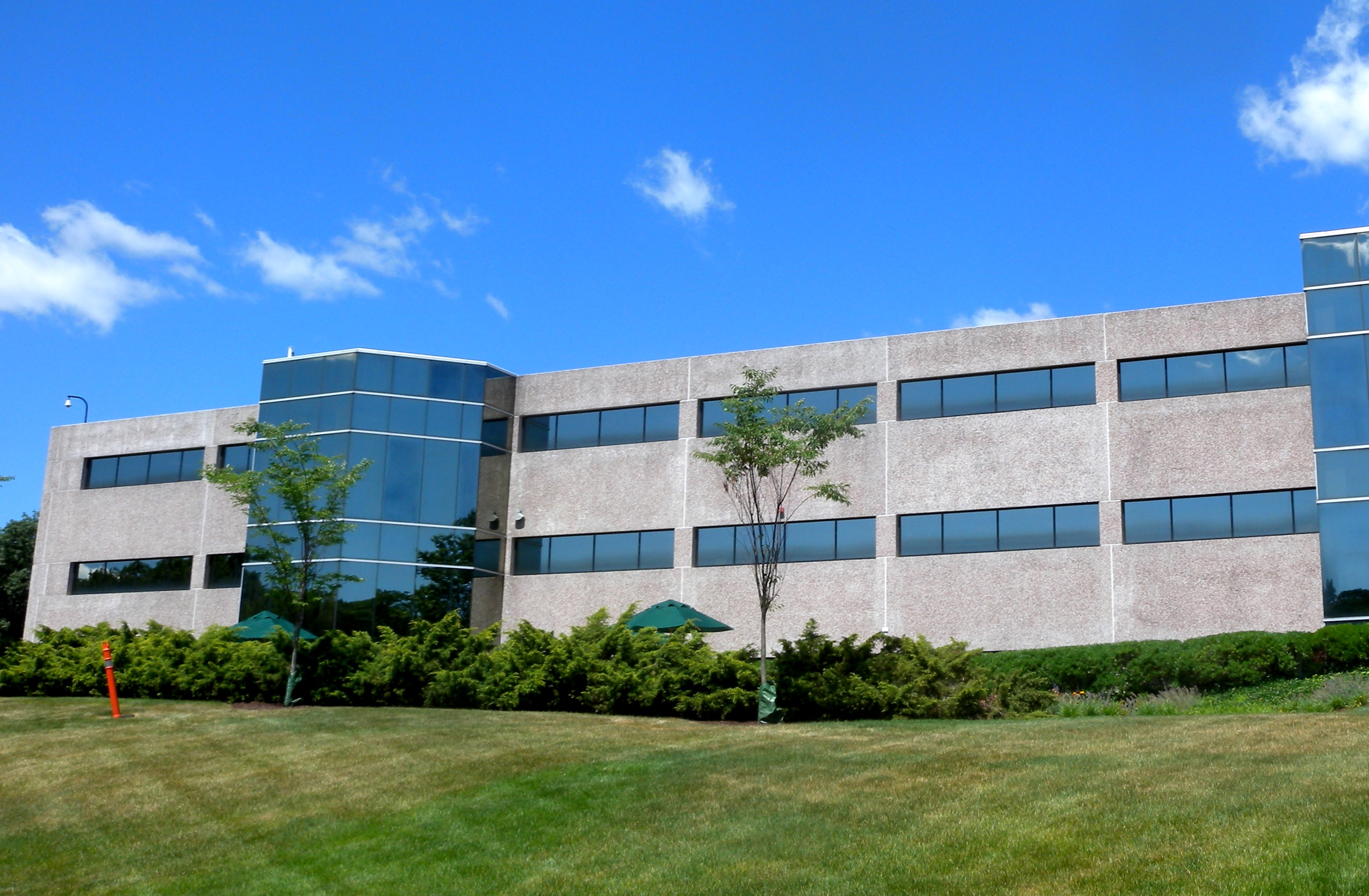
Unilever North American headquarters

CNBC, LG North American headquarters, and Unilever North America are headquartered in Englewood Cliffs.

LG Electronics opened its purpose-built 352,000-square-foot (32,700 m^{2}) North American headquarters building in Englewood Cliffs in 2018. The headquarters previously occupied multiple buildings in the borough. Construction on the new building initially began in 2013 but was delayed for several years by lawsuits that sought to reduce its height, originally proposed to be 143-foot (44 m). Environmental groups contended that the original design would exceed the borough's 35-foot (11 m) limit, disrupt views of the Palisades and would violate a longstanding precedent that structures erected north of the George Washington Bridge should not be visible above the New Jersey Palisades. A settlement in 2015 set the height at 69 feet (21 m), the level of the tree line above the Palisades. In response to the settlement, LG commissioned a new, lower design that would accommodate up to 1,000 employees.

In 2017, Maserati announced it was moving its U.S. headquarters from Englewood Cliffs to the former Walter P. Chrysler Museum in Auburn Hills, Michigan.

== Government ==
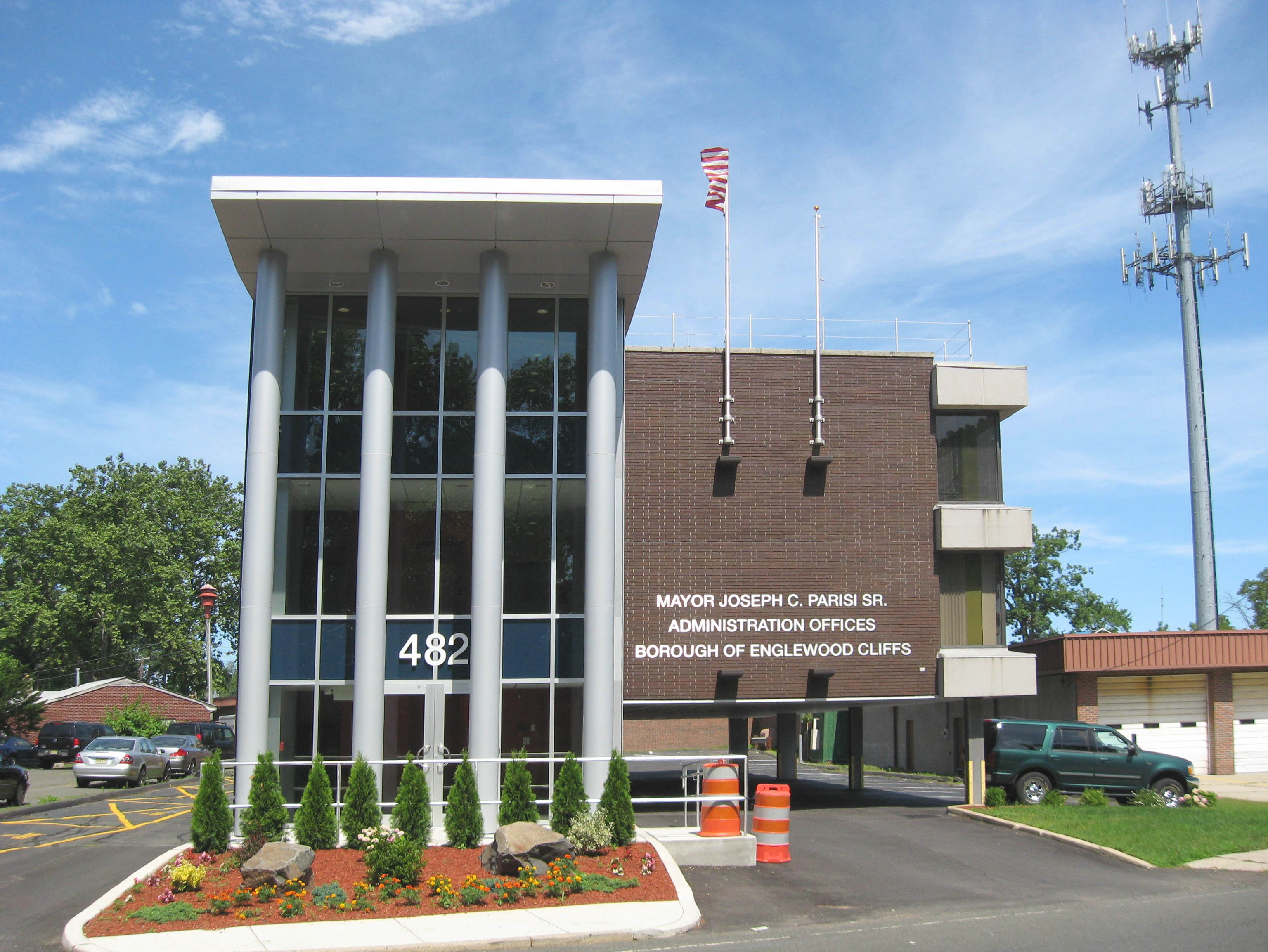
Englewood Cliffs borough administration office building, in 2017 the words "Mayor Joseph C. Parisi Sr." would be removed by then mayor Mario Kranjac.

=== Local government ===
Englewood Cliffs is governed under the borough form of New Jersey municipal government, which is used in 218 municipalities (of the 564) statewide, making it the most common form of government in New Jersey. The governing body is comprised of a mayor and a borough council, with all positions elected at-large on a partisan basis as part of the November general election. A mayor is elected directly by the voters to a four-year term of office. The borough council includes six members elected to serve three-year terms on a staggered basis, with two seats coming up for election each year in a three-year cycle. The borough form of government used by Englewood Cliffs is a "weak mayor / strong council" government in which council members act as the legislative body with the mayor presiding at meetings and voting only in the event of a tie. The mayor can veto ordinances subject to an override by a two-thirds majority vote of the council. The mayor makes committee and liaison assignments for council members, and most appointments are made by the mayor with the advice and consent of the council.

As of 2025, the mayor is Republican Mark K. Park, whose term of office ends December 31, 2027. Members of the Borough Council are Rivka Biegacz (R, 2026), Kris Kim (D, 2025), Tim Koutroubas (R, 2027), Philip Zhi Liang (R, 2026) and Rashid Patel (R, 2027), with a vacant seat expiring in 2025.

==== Mayors ====
- Mark K. Park 2024 to present
- Mario Kranjac 2016 to 2024; Kranjac became the borough's first Republican mayor in 40 years when he was elected in 2015.
- Joseph Parisi Jr. 2008 to 2015.
- Joseph Parisi Sr. 1976 to 2005.
- Thomas E. Stagnitti (1923–2006) – 1964 to 1976.
- William Outis Allison (1849–1924). He was the first mayor of Englewood Cliffs, and served four terms in office, from 1895 to 1911 (?).

=== Federal, state, and county representation ===
Englewood Cliffs is located in the 5th Congressional District and is part of New Jersey's 37th state legislative district.

For the 119th United States Congress, New Jersey's 5th congressional district is represented by Josh Gottheimer (D, Wyckoff). New Jersey is represented in the United States Senate by Democrats Cory Booker (Newark, term ends 2027) and Andy Kim (Moorestown, term ends 2031).

For the 2026–2027 session, the 37th legislative district of the New Jersey Legislature is represented in the New Jersey Senate by Gordon M. Johnson (D, Englewood) and in the General Assembly by Shama Haider (D, Tenafly) and Ellen Park (D, Englewood Cliffs).

Bergen County is governed by a directly elected County Executive, with legislative functions performed by a Board of County Commissioners comprised of seven members who are elected at-large to three-year terms in partisan elections on a staggered basis, with either two or three seats coming up for election each November; a Chairman and Vice Chairman are selected from among its seven members at a reorganization meeting held every January. As of 2025, the county executive is James J. Tedesco III (D, Paramus), whose four-year term of office ends December 31, 2026.

Bergen County's Commissioners are Chair Mary J. Amoroso (D, Mahwah, 2025), Vice Chair Steven A. Tanelli (D, North Arlington, 2027), Chair Pro Tem Joan Voss (D, Fort Lee, 2026), Rafael Marte (D, Bergenfield, 2026), Germaine M. Ortiz (D, Emerson, 2025), Thomas J. Sullivan Jr. (D, Montvale, 2025) and Tracy Silna Zur (D, Franklin Lakes, 2027).

Bergen County's elected constitutional officials are Clerk John S. Hogan (D, Northvale, 2026), Sheriff Anthony Cureton (D, Englewood, 2027) and Surrogate Michael R. Dressler (D, Cresskill, 2026).

=== Politics ===
Presidential election results

United States presidential election results for Englewood Cliffs
Year	Republican		Democratic		Third party(ies)	
Year	No.	%	No.	%	No.	%
2024	1,364	50.20%	1,290	47.48%	63	2.32%
2020	1,490	44.89%	1,794	54.05%	35	1.05%
2016	1,160	43.72%	1,414	53.30%	79	2.98%
2012	1,369	55.27%	1,086	43.84%	22	0.89%
2008	1,415	51.51%	1,301	47.36%	31	1.13%
2004	1,457	52.33%	1,316	47.27%	11	0.40%
2000	1,270	48.22%	1,298	49.28%	66	2.51%
1996	1,219	45.86%	1,277	48.04%	162	6.09%
1992	1,469	49.03%	1,241	41.42%	286	9.55%
1988	1,928	62.99%	1,124	36.72%	9	0.29%
1984	2,120	65.59%	1,107	34.25%	5	0.15%
1980	1,827	59.30%	885	28.72%	369	11.98%
1976	1,678	55.09%	1,319	43.30%	49	1.61%
1972	1,849	60.78%	1,164	38.26%	29	0.95%
1968	1,303	47.45%	1,340	48.80%	103	3.75%
1964	829	34.36%	1,579	65.44%	5	0.21%
1960	861	54.77%	706	44.91%	5	0.32%

In March 2011, there were a total of 3,505 registered voters in Englewood Cliffs, of which 1,069 (30.5% vs. 31.7% countywide) were registered as Democrats, 761 (21.7% vs. 21.1%) were registered as Republicans and 1,675 (47.8% vs. 47.1%) were registered as Unaffiliated. There were no voters registered to other parties. Among the borough's 2010 Census population, 66.4% (vs. 57.1% in Bergen County) were registered to vote, including 84.6% of those ages 18 and over (vs. 73.7% countywide).

Gubernatorial election results for Englewood Cliffs
Year	Republican		Democratic		Third party(ies)	
Year	No.	%	No.	%	No.	%
2025	1,134	55.70%	886	43.52%	16	0.79%
2021	914	52.20%	832	47.52%	5	0.29%
2017	909	49.46%	902	49.08%	27	1.47%
2013	1,182	74.20%	397	24.92%	14	0.88%
2009	1,059	52.84%	879	43.86%	66	3.29%
2005	877	48.51%	909	50.28%	22	1.22%

In the 2013 gubernatorial election, Republican Chris Christie received 74.2% of the vote (1,182 cast), ahead of Democrat Barbara Buono with 24.9% (397 votes), and other candidates with 0.9% (14 votes), among the 1,669 ballots cast by the borough's 3,528 registered voters (76 ballots were spoiled), for a turnout of 47.3%. In the 2009 gubernatorial election, Republican Chris Christie received 1,059 votes (51.5% vs. 45.8% countywide), ahead of Democrat Jon Corzine with 879 votes (42.7% vs. 48.0%), Independent Chris Daggett with 54 votes (2.6% vs. 4.7%) and other candidates with 12 votes (0.6% vs. 0.5%), among the 2,057 ballots cast by the borough's 3,588 registered voters, yielding a 57.3% turnout (vs. 50.0% in the county).

United States Senate election results for Englewood Cliffs1
Year	Republican		Democratic		Third party(ies)	
Year	No.	%	No.	%	No.	%
2024	1,267	47.40%	1,352	50.58%	54	2.02%
2018	923	50.80%	853	46.95%	41	2.26%
2012	1,155	50.48%	1,093	47.77%	40	1.75%
2006	984	49.27%	992	49.67%	21	1.05%

United States Senate election results for Englewood Cliffs2
Year	Republican		Democratic		Third party(ies)	
Year	No.	%	No.	%	No.	%
2020	1,545	47.36%	1,693	51.90%	24	0.74%
2014	891	49.83%	861	48.15%	36	2.01%
2013	411	51.96%	374	47.28%	6	0.76%
2008	1,184	47.17%	1,295	51.59%	31	1.24%

== Emergency services ==
=== Ambulance corps ===
Emergency medical services (EMS) are provided to the borough of Englewood Cliffs by Englewood Hospital and Medical Center under the terms of an agreement between the borough and the hospital.

The borough had been served by the Englewood Cliffs Volunteer Ambulance Corps, which was staffed by trained and certified Emergency Medical Technicians who were on call from 7:00 PM to 6:00 AM on weekdays and 24/7 on weekends. ECVAC maintained three vehicles, two Ford Type-III ambulances and a Chevy Tahoe SUV and responded to an average of over 300 medical emergencies each year. The ECVAC was disbanded in August 2012 by the mayor and council of Englewood Cliffs, citing delays in providing prompt emergency response to borough residents due to the lack of volunteers, and replaced by a contract with Englewood Hospital and Medical Center.

== Education ==
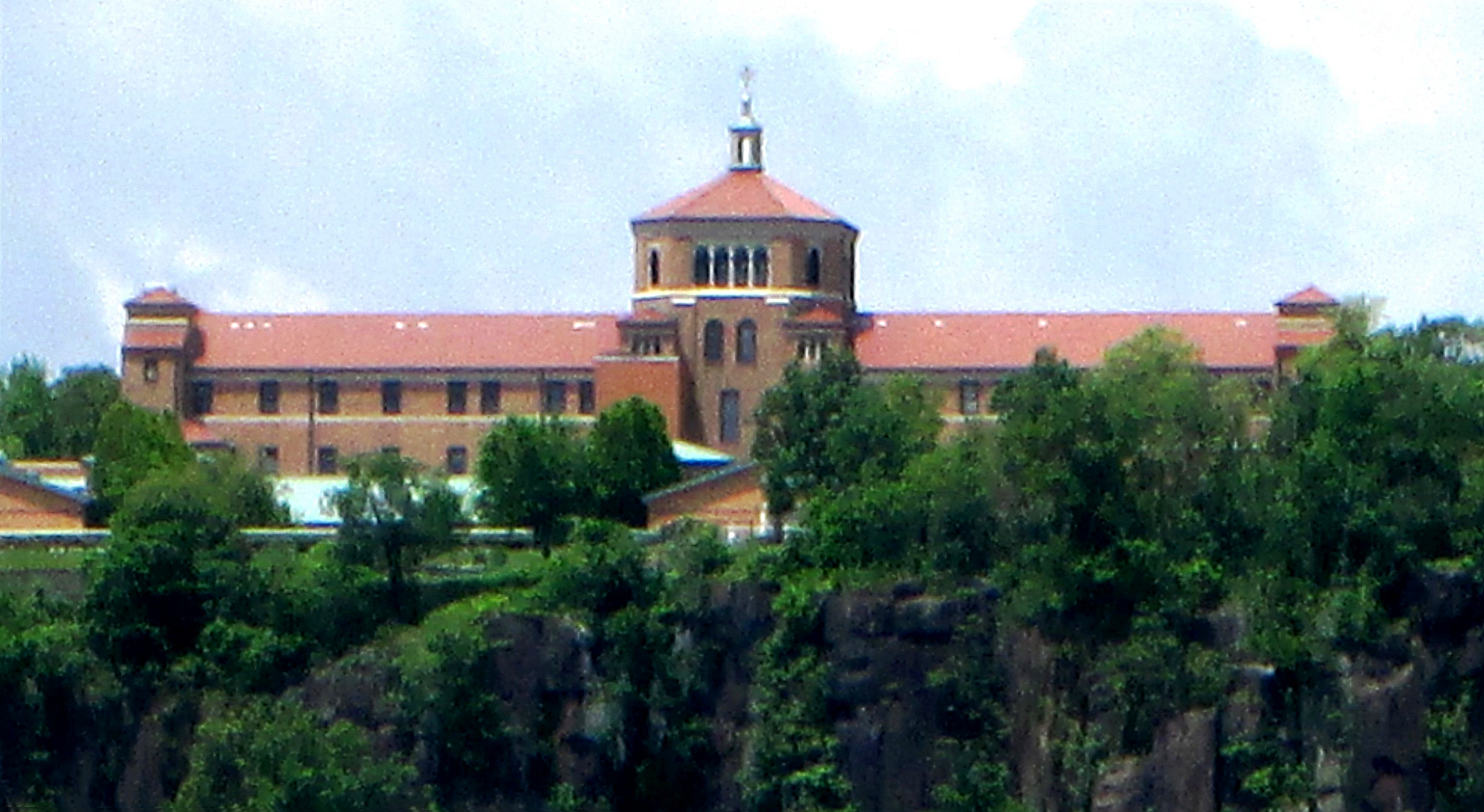
The Englewood Cliffs campus of Saint Peter's University seen from Manhattan

The Englewood Cliffs Public Schools serves children in pre-kindergarten through eighth grade. As of the 2020–21 school year, the district, comprised of two schools, had an enrollment of 439 students and 48.3 classroom teachers (on an FTE basis), for a student–teacher ratio of 9.1:1. Schools in the district (with 2020–21 enrollment data from the National Center for Education Statistics) are North Cliff School with 139 students in grades PreK–2 and Upper School with 292 students in grades 3–8.

The school district has a sending/receiving relationship with the Englewood Public School District under which students attend public high school at Dwight Morrow High School in Englewood. As of the 2020–21 school year, the high school had an enrollment of 1,049 students and 84.8 classroom teachers (on an FTE basis), for a student–teacher ratio of 12.4:1.

Public school students from the borough, and all of Bergen County, are eligible to attend the secondary education programs offered by the Bergen County Technical Schools, which include the Bergen County Academies in Hackensack, and the Bergen Tech campus in Teterboro or Paramus. The district offers programs on a shared-time or full-time basis, with admission based on a selective application process and tuition covered by the student's home school district.

Since 1975, Englewood Cliffs has been home to a campus of Saint Peter's University, where evening and weekend classes are offered for associate degrees, bachelor's degrees, and graduate degrees. The college's nursing program for registered nurses is also located at the campus. Previously, the campus had been home to Englewood Cliffs College, which closed in 1974.

=== Library ===
The borough does not have its own public library. After a 47-year-long relationship with the Englewood Public Library under which the borough paid $225,000 to allow borough residents to use the city's library, Englewood Cliffs started negotiations in 2016 with other municipalities to pay for privileges elsewhere.

== Transportation ==
=== Roads and highways ===
As of May 2010, the borough had a total of 35.16 miles (56.58 km) of roadways, of which 27.89 miles (44.88 km) were maintained by the municipality, 1.66 miles (2.67 km) by Bergen County, 2.82 miles (4.54 km) by the New Jersey Department of Transportation and 2.79 miles (4.49 km) by the Palisades Interstate Park Commission.

U.S. Route 9W and the Palisades Parkway both run alongside each other for about 2.8 miles (4.5 km) along the Hudson River from Fort Lee in the south to Tenafly in the north. CR 505 (Hudson Terrace / East Palisades Avenue) travels through the borough from Fort Lee in the south to Englewood in the west. Motorists can also take a scenic drive along Henry Hudson Drive at the Palisades Interstate Park, which is accessible via Dyckman Hill Road.

=== Public transportation ===
NJ Transit bus route 156 serves the Port Authority Bus Terminal in Midtown Manhattan and the 186 terminates at the George Washington Bridge Bus Terminal.

Rockland Coaches provides service along Route 9W to the Port Authority Bus Terminal on the 9T / 9AT routes and to the George Washington Bridge Bus Terminal on the 9 and 9A routes.

== Notable people ==
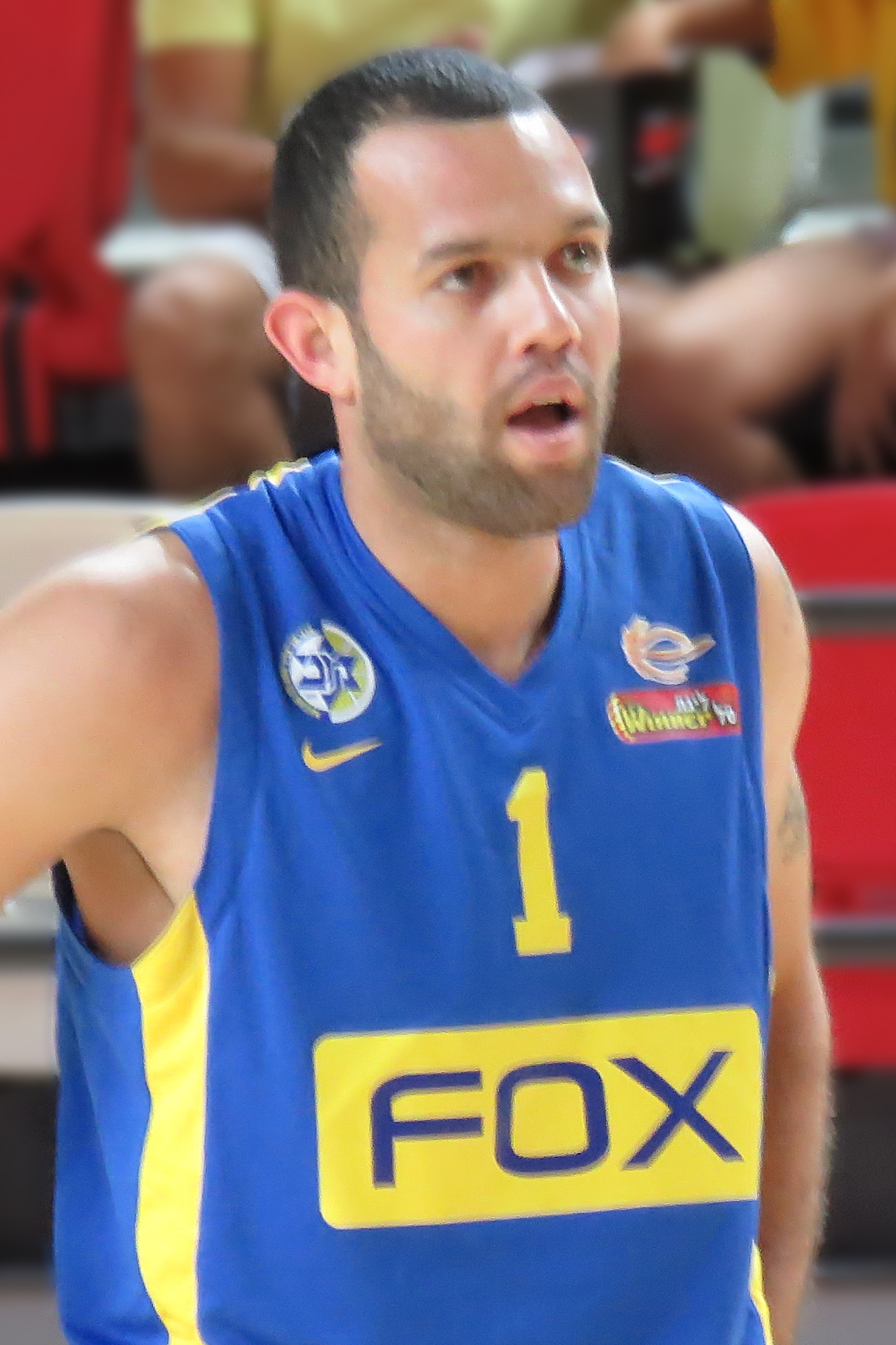
Jordan Farmar

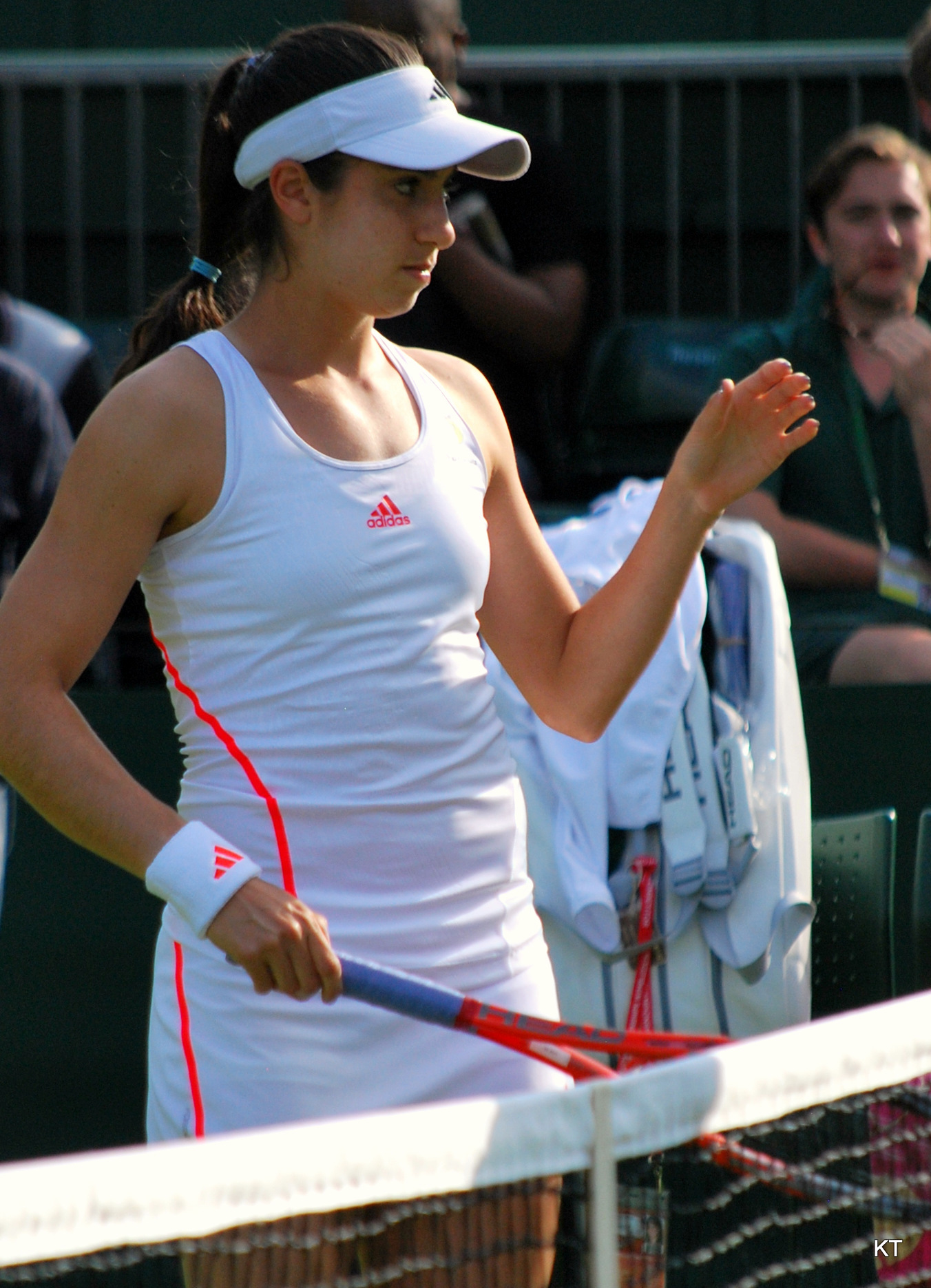
Christina McHale

People who were born in, residents of, or otherwise closely associated with Englewood Cliffs include:

- Robert A. Agresta (born 1983), investor, businessman, lawyer and inventor who has served on the Englewood Cliffs Borough Council
- Alan Aisenberg (born 1993), actor and television producer, best known for his role as Baxter Bayley on the Netflix original series Orange Is the New Black
- William Outis Allison (1849–1924) first mayor of Englewood Cliffs
- Foxy Brown (born 1978), rapper
- Ernest Cadgene (1879–1934), businessman and expert on silk dyes
- Lee Conklin (born 1941), artist best known for his psychedelic poster art of the late 1960s and his iconic album cover for Santana's debut album
- Patrick Ewing (born 1962), former professional and Basketball Hall of Fame player for the New York Knicks
- Tali Farhadian Weinstein (born 1975/1976), former US federal prosecutor
- Jordan Farmar (born 1986), basketball player who has played for the New Jersey Nets
- Sadek Hilal (1930–2000), radiologist who was an influential researcher in advancing imaging science and radiology
- Roberta S. Jacobson (born 1960, née Steinfeld), U.S. diplomat who has served as Assistant Secretary of State for Western Hemisphere Affairs since March 2012
- Anjli Jain (born 1981), Executive Director of the CampusEAI Consortium
- Mario Jascalevich (1927–1984), physician tried and acquitted for the murder of five of his patients with curare, in a case often referred to as the "Dr. X" killings
- Maude Sherwood Jewett (1873–1953), sculptor
- Rob Kaminsky (born 1994), MLB pitcher for the St. Louis Cardinals
- Christina McHale (born 1992), professional tennis player
- Alan Mruvka (born 1958), film producer and entrepreneur
- Anne Nichols (1891–1966), playwright who created Abie's Irish Rose
- Jill Oakes (born 1984), professional soccer player
- Ellen Park (born 1972), politician who represents the 37th Legislative District in the New Jersey General Assembly
- Rozanne Pollack (born 1948), contract bridge player
- Christopher Porrino (born 1967), lawyer who became Acting New Jersey Attorney General in June 2016
- Peggy Siegal (born 1947), entertainment publicist and event planner
- Q-Tip (born 1970), hip-hop MC and producer
- Emily Remler (1957–1990), jazz guitarist in the 1980s
- Arnold Squitieri (1936–2022), underboss of the Gambino crime family
- Louis Teicher (1924–2008), piano player and half of the duo Ferrante & Teicher
- Elizabeth Thompson (1954-2023), painter
- Trish Van Devere (born 1941), actress
- Rudy Van Gelder (1924–2016), jazz recording engineer
- Sarah Vaughan (1924–1990), jazz singer

== See also ==
- List of U.S. cities with significant Korean-American populations
- Van Gelder Studio
