= University Finance Lab =

American electronic trading consultancy

- Company type: Private company
- Industry: Consulting
- Headquarters: United States
- Products: Digital display design for universities and colleges
- Owner: Rise Display
- Website: universityfinancelab.com

University Finance Lab is a United States-based consultancy that assists colleges and universities with their in-house facilities such as computer rooms and finance labs. It is a complete directory of university-based finance labs and offers research on the performance and need for such rooms at business schools across North America.

== History ==
University Finance Lab has offered consultancy and design rendering since its establishment. The company's role and the general role of trading rooms has received coverage since the start of the 21st century. The company predominantly works with North American-based universities, where the majority of demand is for education-based trading rooms.

In 2005, the company was featured in an article created by McMaster University that studied the role that finance labs can play as a learning aid for economics students. The article, which also discussed the discrepancies in theoretical knowledge and practical application shown by students, went on to feature in the peer-reviewed Journal of Financial Education. At the time, University Finance Lab had already been established and was used as an example to help promote a higher level of competency with students that had graduated.

Later that year, a similar study was carried out by the non-profit education Educause. This study focused on how technology could improve higher education and how trading rooms designed by University Finance Lab and their partners assisted learning in higher education.

As universities and colleges installed more trading rooms, various journals discussed their uses. As a result, the overall approach to the design and implementation of future finance labs changed to ensure they could be used for multiple learning techniques.

University Finance Labs started to develop numerous partnerships from 2006 onwards. As the need for technology grew, such as tickers, this technology was increasingly implemented in business schools.

Since the introduction of finance labs and trading rooms into an academic environment, more elaborate and high-tech labs have appeared. In 2010, an article was published in the New York Times on the introduction and development of many university-based finance labs. Investment from firms such as Goldman Sachs began to filter into the operations, developing more realistic trading rooms and giving students more capital to utilize. At the time, the largest investments came at Ivy League schools, many of which had finance labs developed by University Finance Labs.

== University trading rooms ==
The need for university-based trading rooms has been present since the late 1990s. Finance labs give students a greater awareness of financial markets and an understanding of how they operate in real-time, along with their rules and regulations. Finance rooms are typically used by economics and finance majors or minors, giving them real experiences while still in an academic environment.

The changing environment on Wall Street and other financial markets has caused teaching in the United States to become more focused on technology. Dominant floor stocks, such as the NYSE, are facing increased competition from automated trading systems, such as the NASDAQ. This rivalry became apparent in 2005 when the NASDAQ overtook the NYSE in both share and dollar transactions. Therefore, while traditional floor trading was still essential, students must now have a greater understanding of automated trading systems and other technological advances in economics.

The size and scale of trading rooms have been known to vary, which can bring costs up from a few thousand dollars to millions, depending on the quality of the trading room.

== See also ==
- Morningstar, Inc.
- Bloomberg
