= Kate Zwaard =

American technologist

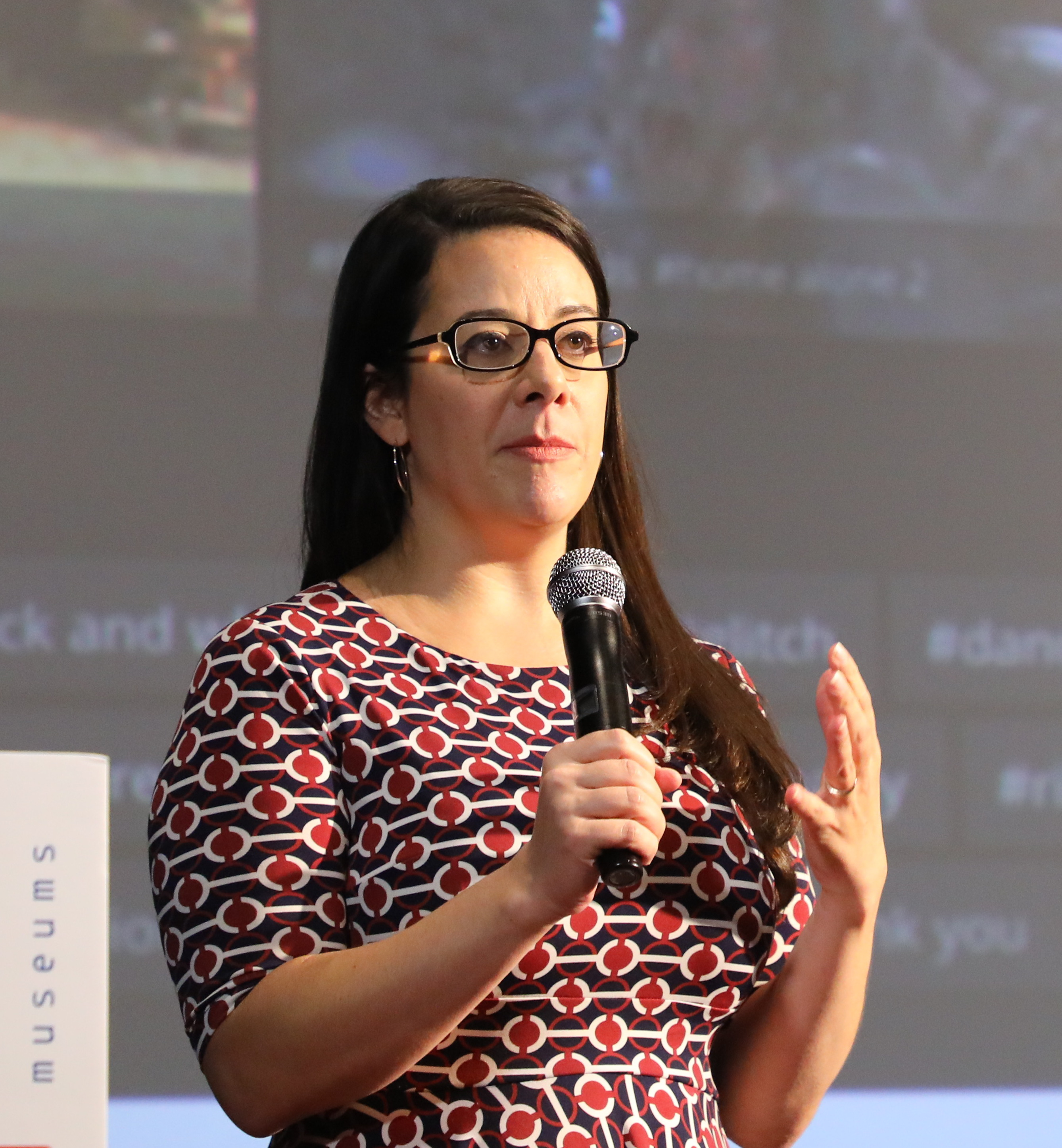
- Zwaard in 2018

Kate Zwaard is an information technologist and the incoming executive director of the Coalition for Networked Information.

== Early life and education ==
Zwaard graduated from the University of Maryland in 2002 with a major in political science and journalism, specializing in public opinion and statistics.

== Career ==
Zwaard began her career as a statistician for the U.S. Government Publishing Office where she worked on a project called Future Digital System, an archival tool designed to provide permanent public electronic access to authentic government publications through a web interface.

She joined the Library of Congress in 2011. There she worked as a software engineering manager, where she led the development of the information technology systems used to manage the Library's digital collections. She was named Chief of National Digital Initiatives in 2016 and saw her role as helping the library to support support digital scholarship, both online and in person. She also served as the Library of Congress’s first director of digital strategy, overseeing their first crowdsourcing project. In 2022 she was appointed appointed associate librarian for Discovery and Preservation Services, in this role she managed over 600 employees and responsible for the acquisitions, cataloging, preservation and discovery of Library collections.

While at the Library she oversaw technological initiatives such as the Newspaper Navigator project, a machine learning project which extracted content from digitized newspapers, and she led the Library's migration from their integrated library system to an open source product.

In July 2025, she was named the incoming director of the Coalition for Networked Information, succeeding Clifford Lynch.
