= Paul Evan Peters =

- Born: December 12, 1947; Dayton, Ohio
- Died: November 18, 1996 (aged 48)
- Education: University of Dayton; University of Pittsburgh; Columbia University
- Occupations: Librarian, Systems Coordinator, Executive Director
- Known for: Founding Executive Director of CNI

Paul Evan Peters (December 12, 1947 – November 18, 1996) was named one of the American Library Association's 100 most important leaders in the 20th century for his leadership of the Coalition for Networked Information (CNI). His work was interdisciplinary, often blurring the lines between library science and technology. Peters was widely respected amongst his colleagues for his contributions, being called an "imagineer," "Mr. Internet himself," and even a "prophet". However, he is likely most well known as the founding executive director of CNI.

== Education ==
Born in Dayton, Ohio, Peters graduated in 1969 from the University of Dayton, receiving undergraduate degrees in computer science and philosophy. During the 1970s he received a Masters of Library and Information Science from the University of Pittsburgh. And in 1986, while working at Columbia University, he earned his master's degree in Sociology.

== Career: Pre-CNI ==
After earning his undergraduate degrees, Peters worked at the National Cash Register Corporation as a retail systems engineer. He spent most of the 1970s working on "research and development projects." Peters went on to work at Columbia University. There, he served as Assistant University Librarian for Systems, and worked on development of early automated circulation and cataloging systems. Peters then worked at the New York Public Library as a Systems Coordinator from 1987 to 1989. This was his last position before he began his post as the founding executive director at CNI.

== Career: CNI ==
In 1990, the Coalition for Networked Information was founded by three organizations: the Association of Research Libraries (ARL), CAUSE, and EDUCOM. (CAUSE and EDUCOM merged in 1998 to become EDUCAUSE.) CNI was initially conceived as a temporary affiliation whose purpose was to "enhance scholarship and intellectual productivity." ARL's Executive Director, Duane Webster, suggested Peters for the role of executive director. Peters' skill set was ideal for this position, and CNI quickly began to thrive.

During Peters' management, CNI launched and collaborated on numerous projects. These included, the Rights for Electronic Access and Delivery of Information (READI), the Elsevier TULIP Project, the Access to Public Information Program, and the National Initiative for a Networked Cultural Heritage (NINCH). CNI's contributions during this time made a lasting impact on all citizens. For example, the Access to Public Information Program impacted decisions made by the Clinton Administration.

Richard P. West, an information technologist involved in the beginnings of CNI, described Peters' methods for effective leadership, explaining:

He was able to bridge the library and information technology communities, draw in new partners from scholarly publishing, the technology sector, and the international community; and he was able to clearly articulate the potential benefits of the availability of digital information to the research and education community.

Ultimately, it was Peters' leadership that transitioned CNI from its initial establishment as a temporary organization, to one of permanence and longevity.

Although Peter's leadership of CNI was cut short by his death in 1996, the impact of his work at CNI lives on. One example is that Peters was "credited with creating an identity for CNI in the scholarly publishing arena as a frontline player."

== Death ==
Paul Evan Peters died on November 18, 1996, at the age of 48 due to an asthma attack. His wife, Rosemarie Kozdron, his parents, Austin and Mary Peters, and his brother, Philip outlived Peters.

== Paul Evan Peters Fellowship ==
After Peters' death, the Paul Evan Peters Fellowship was created in remembrance of him and his contributions to the information sciences. Beginning in 2002, the Fellowship has been awarded to a qualifying graduate student on a biennial basis.

== Ongoing Relevance to Information Science ==
Colleagues thought highly of Peters, particularly Kopp, who in his obituary wrote that Peters "might be considered a prophet of his time and of his profession." Although a lofty claim, notions in Peters' writings, specifically "General Library Standards" and "The Changing Infrastructure for Information Distribution," despite completion in the late 1980s and 1990s, still feel current today.

Peters had a definitive opinion on updating standards in libraries due to technological progress:

I support and actively participate in the standards efforts of libraries and librarians which are motivated by the sincere desire to progress toward a future information world that is more coherent and comprehensible than the one we now face and will likely be facing for some time to come.

Not only does his stance feel relevant today, it reads like common sense despite being written over twenty years ago.

In 1993, Peters' "The Changing Infrastructure for Information Distribution" touched on the human aspects and implications of networking. Peters wrote "the most important thing being networked is people and not computers," and "in general, I believe that the greatest transformational effects of network infrastructures and networked information environments will be felt, at least initially, in how well and how widely we mobilize people and information to bring to bear on problems."

Therefore, it's clear that Peters recognized the importance of technology as infrastructure. However, he was also cognizant of the far larger importance that technological infrastructure results in bringing people and information together for the benefit of the greater good. Nearly twenty years after Peters wrote this article, people now convene on a daily basis using networks, the Internet, and the World Wide Web, working on problems ranging from the local to the global.

In another example of the prescience that Kopp attributed to Peters, Peters made the following comment in an interview in 1996:

The Web is not the end, because nothing on the Net right now is true to the dynamic, complex character of the way that people learn information, and it won't be until the basic architecture is phrased in human terms.

== Selected Professional Associations and Awards ==
- President of the ALA's Library and Information Technology Association from 1991 - 1992
- Chair of the National Information Standards Organization from 1989 - 1991
- Curator of The Global Library Exhibit at the New York Public Library

== Selected publications ==
- Beck, C., McKechnie T., & Peters, P. E. (1979). Political Science Thesaurus II: Revised and Expanded Second Edition. (2nd ed.). Pittsburgh: University Center for International Studies in conjunction with the American Political Science Association.
- Peters, P. E. (1988). "General Library Standards". Publishing Research Quarterly. 4 (3): 20–24. doi:10.1007/BF02683719. S2CID 144824224.
- Peters, P. E. (1993). "The Changing Infrastructure for Information Distribution". Information Technology and Libraries. 12: 250–253.
