= William Outis Allison =

Mayor in New Jersey (1849–1924)

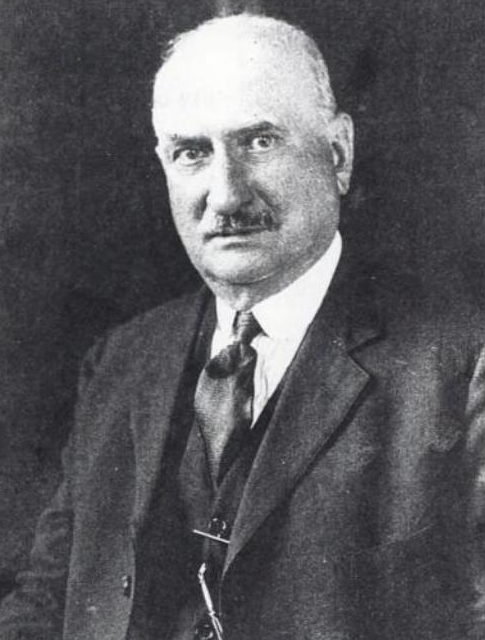

William Outis Allison (1849 – December 18, 1924) was the first mayor of Englewood Cliffs, New Jersey, after it split from Englewood, New Jersey, in 1895 and served four terms in office.

== Biography ==
Allison was born in 1849 in Undercliff (now Edgewater, New Jersey).

His home burned to the ground in November 1903, resulting in a loss estimated at $75,000.

He died on December 18, 1924, at his apartment at 115 West 16th Street in Manhattan. He was buried in Brookside Cemetery in Englewood, New Jersey. His estate was worth over $3 million (equivalent to $56.4 million in 2025).
