= Ernest Cadgene =

French-American businessman (1879–1934)

Ernest Jacques Cadgene (March 31, 1879 – February 4, 1934) was a French-American businessman and expert on silk dyes.

He was born in Lyon on March 31, 1879. He obtained qualifications in chemistry from the University of Zurich, and worked for his father's company in Lyons. In 1904 he emigrated to the US, working for Weidmannn Silk Dyeing Company in Paterson, New Jersey. In 1906 he and Herman Simon started a company together, Cadgene Silk Dyeing and Finishing, but resigned in 1912, and joined Lyons Piece Dye Works, also in Paterson. Simon subsequently sued Cadgene, claiming that Cadgene had persuaded all their customers to transfer their business to Lyons Piece Dye Works. The new company became "one of the largest silk dyeing companies in the world".

He married his wife, Marie Pervilhac, on July 28, 1909. In 1932, his 52-acre (21 ha) estate in Englewood Cliffs, New Jersey, on The Palisades, was put up for sale, valued at about $2.5 million (equivalent to $57.6 million in 2024).

He died of a heart attack on February 4, 1934, at his home in Englewood Cliffs. He was survived by his wife, and five children: Jacques, Henry, George, Simone, and Marie Yvonne.
