= Campus Consortium =

Non-profit organisation

- Company type: Not for Profit
- Industry: K-12, Higher Education
- Founded: 2003; 23 years ago
- Founder: University of Nevada, Las Vegas, Oklahoma State University, Rochester Institute of Technology, Case Western Reserve University, University of Montana and University of North Carolina, Chapel Hill
- Headquarters: Miami, Florida, United States
- Area served: 10+ countries
- Key people: Karl Horvath (President)
- Number of employees: 50
- Website: www.campusconsortium.org

Campus Consortium, previously CampusEAI Consortium, is a non-profit organisation which provides IT consulting services to colleges.

Campus Consortium was founded in 2003 by fourteen institutions in response to increasing IT budget cuts, resource constraints, and the needs of incoming students. Among the founding universities are the University of Montana; the University of Nevada, Las Vegas; and Oklahoma State University.

== History ==
Campus Consortium was founded by fourteen institutions—including University of North Carolina, Chapel Hill, Case Western Reserve University, University of Nevada, Las Vegas, Rochester Institute of Technology, University of Montana, the University of Montana, and Oklahoma State University.

Campus Consortium was incorporated as a non-profit in Ohio by Executive Director, now Chairman, Anjli Jain in June 2003.

The Executive Advisory Committee was established in June 2004 composed of CIOs from various member campuses:.

- Adelphi University - Jack Chen, CIO
- Albany State University - Virginia Stewart, Vice-President, Information & Instructional Technology
- Boston College - Mike Bourque, AVP of ITS
- California State University, LA - Peter Quan
- Essex County College - Mohamed Seddiki, Director of Information Technology
- James Madison University - Robin Bryan, Exec Dir IT
- Lourdes College - Laurie Orzechowski, Director of Administrative Systems
- Loyola Marymount University - Patrick Frontiera, Vice President for Information Technology
- University of Nevada, Las Vegas, - Lori Temple, VP for IT

In June 2005, the company received a grant from the City of Cleveland to move its headquarters from the BioEnterprise incubator located on the Case Western Reserve University campus to downtown Cleveland. The following August, Campus Consortium received a Certificate of Recognition from the Mayor of Cleveland in recognition of the Consortium's active participation in creating a new IT industry in Cleveland and for the organization's dedication to servicing higher education.
