= Anjli Jain =

American businesswoman

- Born: 1981 (age 44–45); New Delhi, India
- Education: Barnard College
- Office: Managing Partner

Anjli Jain (born 1981) is an American executive, the Managing Partner of EVC Ventures, a $50-million venture capital fund. On January 10, 2004, Anjli Jain became the Executive Director of the CampusEAI Consortium.

== Biography ==
Anjli Jain was born in New Delhi, India and grew up in Englewood Cliffs, New Jersey. Jain graduated from Barnard College of Columbia University with a Bachelor of Arts in Anthropology in 2003. While attending Barnard College of Columbia University in 2002, she interned at the Higher Education Knowledge And Technology Exchange (HEKATE), a non-profit think tank, located in Washington D.C. After completing her formal education, she was recruited to serve as the Executive Director of the CampusEAI Consortium by the fourteen (14) colleges and universities including The University of Montana, Rochester Institute of Technology, and University of Nevada, Las Vegas that established the CampusEAI Consortium. In 2011, Jain was a recipient of the Cleveland Professional 20/30 Club's Northeast Ohio Top 25 Under 35 Movers & Shaker Award.

On October 27, 2010, in her role as executive director of the CampusEAI Consortium, Jain was a part of the Fifth Annual Women's Leadership Forum at Notre Dame College in Cleveland, Ohio. Jain is also on the Board of Directors for the Greater Cleveland YWCA.
