= Worldware =

Worldware is a term coined in the 1990s to denote software that is created and marketed mainly for purposes other than teaching and learning, but which is also used for teaching and learning.

Educom (a collaboration among universities to explore the use of technology in higher education) launched a "Valuable Viable Software" (VVS) task force in the 1990s, to evaluate the success of different kinds of software being used for teaching in universities. Steve Ehrmann, a member of the task force, is widely credited with coining the term "worldware" to describe multipurpose software already in widespread use outside universities. Writing in 1995, Ehrmann explained the term as follows:

Worldware is developed for purposes other than instruction but is also used for teaching and learning. Word processors are worldware. So are computer-aided design packages. So are electronic mail and the Internet.

Reporting their findings in 1994, VVS stated that the most successful learning came, not from instructional packages, but from students working with "worldware" or with student editions of worldware.

When interviewed for a virtual round table in 2009, Ehrmann explained that worldware (and its student editions) had many advantages over typical instructional software:

It was much more likely to be known in advance to the students and to the teachers. And it was much more likely to be seen as legitimate-- the students and teachers could see that it was valued in the larger world. ... Then, too, there was the amortization of costs. A large market was paying for worldware, so the cost per user to develop, market, support, maintain, and upgrade worldware typically was low while the cost per user for courseware was usually high. Another big advantage: If a vendor went out of business, another vendor might come in and be able to run the files that had run on the previous vendor's software. These were all potentially significant advantages.
