= E-58 =

Advanced network infrastructure term

E-58 is an advanced network infrastructure development effort encompassing communities throughout the Tobacco Region of Virginia, United States, along the line of U.S. Route 58. The Virginia Tobacco Indemnification and Community Revitalization Commission is managing e-58 for the economic development interest of the tobacco regions.
