= Educause =

American nonprofit

Educause is a nonprofit association in the United States whose mission is "to advance higher education through the use of information technology". Membership is open to institutions of higher education, corporations serving the higher education information technology market, and other related associations and organizations.

== Overview ==
The association provides networking and other platforms for higher education IT professionals to generate and find content on best practices and to engage their peers. Examples include professional development opportunities, print and electronic publications, including e-books and the magazine Educause Review (ISSN 1945-709X), strategic policy advocacy, teaching and learning initiatives, applied research, special interest discussion groups, awards for leadership, and a resource center for IT professionals, such as Campus Privacy Officers, in higher education.

Major initiatives of Educause include the Core Data Service, the Educause Center for Analysis and Research (ECAR), the Educause Learning Initiative (ELI), the Educause Policy Program, and the Educause/Internet2 Computer and Network Security Task Force. In addition, Educause manages the .edu Internet domain under a contract with the United States Department of Commerce. The technical aspects of the registry are managed by VeriSign.

The current membership of Educause comprises more than 2,300 colleges, universities, and educational organizations, including 300 corporations, with 16,500 active members. (Citation?)

== Edupage ==
Edupage was a publication of Educause. It was a free three-time-a-week electronically distributed summary of technology news extracted from the mainstream media that was first released to a circulation of less than 100 in 1992. It was originally written by John Gehl and Suzanne Douglas, who left in April 1999 to devote their full attention to their company which publishes a daily newsletter similar to Edupage.

Edupage is currently in a publishing hiatus (since December 2006), as Educause looks at different ways to deliver resources and content to their audience.

== History ==
Educause was formed from a merger of CAUSE and Educom in 1998. The two organizations were the two major information technology associations within higher education. CAUSE grew out of a users group known as the College and University Systems Exchange.

== See also ==
- Campus Consortium
- Internet2
- Worldware, term coined by the Valuable Viable Software (VVS) project of Educom
